= List of county routes in Livingston County, New York =

County routes in Livingston County, New York, are signed with the Manual on Uniform Traffic Control Devices-standard yellow-on-blue pentagon route marker.

== Routes 1–40 ==
Route	Length (mi)	Length (km)	From	Via	To	Notes
CR 1	2.99	4.81	NY 63 in Groveland	Scottsburg Road	NY 256 / CR 1A in Sparta	Former routing of NY 256
CR 1A	1.57	2.53	NY 256 / CR 1	Springwater Road in Sparta	CR 38 / CR 71	
CR 2	5.69	9.16	CR 1	Groveland Hill Road in Groveland	CR 10 / CR 44 / CR 45 / CR 48	
CR 3	2.96	4.76	NY 408	Barron Road in Mount Morris	CR 30A	Formerly part of NY 258
CR 4	2.99	4.81	Letchworth State Park	Gibsonville Road in Leicester	US 20A / NY 39 / CR 64	
CR 5	3.04	4.89	NY 36 / CR 23	Fowlerville Road in York	CR 22 at Avon town line	
CR 6	4.77	7.68	CR 8 at Conesus town line	East Lake Road in Livonia	US 20A / NY 15 / CR 62	
CR 7	1.30	2.09	CR 20	Main Street in Portage	NY 70	
CR 8	3.21	5.17	CR 33	East Lake Road in Conesus	CR 6 at Livonia town line	
CR 9	4.49	7.23	CR 17 / CR 80 in Ossian	Ossian Hill Road	NY 436 in North Dansville	
CR 10	3.87	6.23	CR 2 / CR 10 / CR 44 / CR 45 in Groveland	Groveland Road	Geneseo village line in Geneseo	
CR 11	4.57	7.35	CR 72	Rock Spring Hill Road in West Sparta	CR 34	
CR 12	3.38	5.44	CR 39 at Livonia town line	Livonia Center Road in Lima	US 20 / NY 5	
CR 13	2.47	3.98	CR 76 at Nunda town line	Redmond Road in West Sparta	CR 59	
CR 14	0.78	1.26	CR 23	Linwood Road North in York	Genesee County line	
CR 15	3.71	5.97	Nunda village line in Nunda	Creek Road	CR 3 in Mount Morris	
CR 16	3.43	5.52	NY 15A	Wheaton Hill Road in Springwater	CR 36	
CR 17	2.16	3.48	CR 9 / CR 80	Sugar Creek Road in Ossian	CR 49 / CR 70	
CR 18	0.85	1.37	Canandaigua Street	River Road in Leicester	Jones Bridge Road	
CR 19	2.71	4.36	NY 15 / CR 52 in Avon	South Lima Road	CR 47 / CR 55 in Livonia	
CR 20	3.86	6.21	Allegany County line (becomes CR 15)	Short Tract Road in Portage	NY 436	
CR 20A	2.75	4.43	NY 436	Short Tract Road in Portage	CR 25	
CR 21	2.04	3.28	Caledonia village line	Iroquois Road in Caledonia	CR 73	
CR 22	2.71	4.36	CR 5 at York town line	Fowlerville Road in Avon	NY 39	
CR 23	3.50	5.63	CR 23A / CR 58	Linwood Road in York	NY 36 / CR 5	
CR 23A	0.25	0.40	Genesee County line (becomes CR 20)	Walker Road in York	CR 23 / CR 58	
CR 24	2.01	3.23	Allegany County line (becomes CR 16)	Birdsall Road in Nunda	CR 24A / CR 68	Part north of Old State Road was formerly part of NY 408
CR 24A	0.32	0.51	CR 68	Birdsall Road in Nunda	NY 70 / NY 408	Formerly part of NY 408
CR 25	1.34	2.16	CR 82 in Portage	Oakland Road	Helena Road in Mount Morris	
CR 26	2.02	3.25	US 20 / NY 5	Rochester Street in Avon	Monroe County line (becomes CR 84)	
CR 27	1.03	1.66	Steuben County line (becomes CR 46)	Stone Falls Road in North Dansville	NY 63	
CR 27B	0.22	0.35	NY 63	Perkinsville Road in North Dansville	Steuben County line (becomes CR 90)	
CR 28	3.98	6.41	CR 32 / CR 48	Lakeville–Grove Road in Geneseo	US 20A	
CR 29	5.81	9.35	NY 256	Reeds Corners Road in Sparta	CR 38	
CR 30	3.68	5.92	CR 30A / CR 43	Dutch Street in Mount Morris	NY 36	
CR 30A	0.79	1.27	CR 3	Main Street in Mount Morris	CR 30 / CR 43	Part south of CR 72 was formerly part of NY 258
CR 31	0.30	0.48	CR 75	Townline Road in Springwater	Steuben County line (becomes CR 93)	
CR 32	3.90	6.28	CR 10	Long Point Road in Geneseo	NY 256	
CR 33	2.26	3.64	NY 256	Sliker Hill Road in Conesus	NY 15 / CR 71	
CR 34	2.69	4.33	CR 57 / CR 59	Stoner Hill Road in West Sparta	NY 36	
CR 35	3.48	5.60	Genesee County line (becomes CR 10)	York Road West in York	NY 36	
CR 36	6.27	10.09	Steuben County line (becomes CR 37)	Tabor Corners Road in Springwater	CR 16	
CR 36A	0.52	0.84	Ontario County line (becomes CR 36)	County Road 36 in Springwater	Ontario County line (becomes CR 36)	
CR 37	2.41	3.88	NY 36	River Road in Leicester	US 20A / NY 39	
CR 38	3.60	5.79	CR 1A / CR 71 in Sparta	Liberty Pole Road	NY 15 in Springwater	
CR 39	2.30	3.70	US 20A / CR 56	Livonia Center Road in Livonia	CR 12 at Lima town line	
CR 40	0.17	0.27	Avon village line	North Avenue in Avon	CR 26	

== Routes 41 and up ==
Route	Length (mi)	Length (km)	From	Via	To	Notes
CR 41	1.18	1.90	US 20A / NY 15A	Richmond Mills Road in Livonia	Ontario County line (becomes CR 15)	
CR 42	1.25	2.01	CR 16	Canadice Road in Springwater	Ontario County line (becomes CR 37)	
CR 43	5.31	8.55	CR 30 / CR 30A	Begole Road in Mount Morris	NY 36	
CR 44	4.50	7.24	NY 63	East Groveland Road in Groveland	CR 2 / CR 10 / CR 45 / CR 48	
CR 45	2.30	3.70	CR 2 / CR 10 / CR 44 / CR 48	Maple Beach Road in Groveland	NY 256	
CR 46	0.51	0.82	CR 68 in Nunda	Oakland Street	NY 70 in Portage	
CR 47	1.77	2.85	Livonia village line	Poplar Hill Road in Livonia	CR 19 / CR 55	
CR 48	2.95	4.75	CR 2 / CR 10 / CR 44 / CR 45 in Groveland	Lakeville–Groveland Road	CR 28 / CR 32 in Geneseo	
CR 49	3.47	5.58	CR 17	McCurdy Road in Ossian	CR 9	
CR 50	4.67	7.52	NY 63	Federal Road in York	CR 23	
CR 51	3.45	5.55	NY 63 in Sparta	Parker Hill Road	CR 1 in Groveland	
CR 52	2.99	4.81	NY 39 in Avon	Triphammer Road	NY 15 / CR 19 in Geneseo	
CR 53			CR 21	Maxwell Station Road in Caledonia	Monroe County line	Former number
CR 54	2.07	3.33	NY 70	Newville Road in Nunda	CR 78	
CR 55	3.37	5.42	CR 19 / CR 47	Poplar Hill Road in Lima	US 20 / NY 5	
CR 56	7.05	11.35	NY 15 in Conesus	Federal Road	US 20A / CR 39 in Livonia	
CR 57	2.10	3.38	NY 436 in Ossian	Kenney Road	CR 34 / CR 59 in West Sparta	
CR 58	2.28	3.67	CR 58A	Stewart Road in York	CR 23	
CR 58A	0.20	0.32	Genesee County line	Craig Road in York	CR 58	
CR 59	4.70	7.56	CR 34 / CR 57	Kysorville–Byersville Road in West Sparta	NY 36	
CR 60	5.87	9.45	Steuben County line	Carney Hollow Road in Springwater	NY 15	
CR 61	3.55	5.71	US 20	Middle Road in Caledonia	Caledonia village line	
CR 62	5.13	8.26	US 20A / NY 15 / CR 6 in Livonia	Bronson Hill Road	US 20 / NY 5 in Avon	
CR 63	0.94	1.51	CR 21	Wheatland Center Road in Caledonia	Monroe County line (becomes CR 174)	
CR 64	2.24	3.60	US 20A / NY 39 / CR 4	Perry Road in Leicester	NY 36	
CR 65	2.62	4.22	US 20 / NY 5	Oak Opening Road in Avon	Monroe County line (becomes CR 78)	
CR 66	2.43	3.91	US 20 / NY 5	Bragg Street, Martin Street, and Ideson Road in Lima	NY 65	
CR 67	1.76	2.83	CR 5	MacIntyre Road in York	US 20	
CR 68	0.27	0.43	Portage town line	Main Street in Nunda	CR 24 / CR 24A	
CR 69	2.26	3.64	CR 9	Valley Road in Ossian	NY 436	
CR 70	2.48	3.99	Allegany County line (becomes CR 13B)	Canaseraga Road in Ossian	CR 17 / CR 49	
CR 71	5.82	9.37	NY 256 in Sparta	Stagecoach Road	NY 15 / CR 33 in Conesus	Formerly NY 255
CR 72	5.84	9.40	CR 30A in Mount Morris	Presbyterian Road	NY 36 / NY 258 in West Sparta	Formerly part of NY 258
CR 73			CR 21	Cameron Road in Caledonia	River Road	Former number
CR 74	1.54	2.48	CR 60	Pokamoonshine Road in Springwater	CR 75	
CR 75	0.38	0.61	CR 31	Becker Road in Springwater	CR 74	
CR 76	1.82	2.93	CR 77	Brokaw Road in Nunda	CR 13 at West Sparta town line	
CR 77	2.91	4.68	CR 15	DeGroff Road in Nunda	CR 76	
CR 78	2.49	4.01	CR 79	Barkertown Road in Nunda	CR 54	
CR 79	1.10	1.77	CR 78	Chidsey Corners Road in Nunda	NY 436	
CR 80	2.63	4.23	CR 9 / CR 17	McNinch Road in Ossian	NY 436 / CR 59	
CR 81	1.07	1.72	Nunda village line	Picket Line Road in Nunda	CR 82	
CR 82	0.83	1.34	CR 25	Middle River Road in Portage	CR 81	
CR 83	0.25	0.40	Stone Hill Road	Jakeman Hill Road in Livonia	Dead end	
CR 84	4.71	7.58	NY 5	River Road in Caledonia	Monroe County line (becomes NY 940H)	
CR 85	0.32	0.51	Parker Road	Al Lorenz Drive in Mount Morris	Murray Hill Drive	

== See also ==
- County routes in New York
