= Grove, New York =

- Town
- Location within New York Location within the United States
- Coordinates: 42°28′25″N 77°53′43″W
- Country: United States
- State: New York
- County: Allegany

Government
  - Type: Town Council
  - Town Supervisor: Michael Johnsen (D, R)
  - Town Council: Members' List: • Ken DeRitter (D, R); • James Blowers (D, R); • Kurt Hofsass (D, R); • Terry Gardner (D, R)

Area
  - Total: 33.70 sq mi (87.29 km^{2})
  - Land: 33.37 sq mi (86.42 km^{2})
  - Water: 0.34 sq mi (0.87 km^{2})
- Elevation: 1,978 ft (603 m)

Population (2020)
  - Total: 497 ▼
  - Estimate (2021): 496
  - Density: 15.9/sq mi (6.14/km^{2})
- Time zone: UTC-5 (Eastern (EST))
  - Summer (DST): UTC-4 (EDT)
- ZIP Codes: 14884 (Swain); 14836 (Dalton); 14822 (Canaseraga)
- Area code: 607
- FIPS code: 36-003-30994
- GNIS feature ID: 0979028

Grove is a small town in Allegany County, New York, United States covering 35 square miles. The population was 497 at the 2020 census. Grove is in the northeast part of Allegany County, northwest of Hornell and is recognized for the Swain Resort which is one of the largest ski resorts in western New York.

== History ==
The town of Grove was formed from Wyoming County on March 8, 1827 as "Church Tract" from the town of Nunda in Livingston County. When first settled it was called Brewer’s Corners in 1823, Then later called Swainsville in honor of an early settler named Samuel Swain. The town assumed its current name on April 16, 1838, possibly based on the large number of trees in the town. Grove lost its western territory to form the newer town of Granger in 1838.

=== Past residents of note ===
Frederick Decker, the "Ossian Giant", was a resident known for his great size (7 feet, six inches, 385 pounds). He was born in Geneseo in 1836 and exhibited himself across the country before settling down in Grove where he died and was buried in 1886.

== Geography ==
According to the United States Census Bureau, the town has a total area of 33.7 square miles (87.3 km^{2}), of which 33.4 square miles (86.4 km^{2}) is land and 0.35 square miles (0.9 km^{2}), or 1.00%, is water.

New York State Route 70 passes across the northeast part of the town.

Canaseraga Creek flows out of The Swamp (or the Swain Swamp if you are not from Swain) towards Canaseraga.

Historical population
Census	Pop.	Note	%±
1830	1,388		—
1840	623		−55.1%
1850	1,154		85.2%
1860	1,139		−1.3%
1870	1,056		−7.3%
1880	1,125		6.5%
1890	956		−15.0%
1900	812		−15.1%
1910	740		−8.9%
1920	602		−18.6%
1930	534		−11.3%
1940	568		6.4%
1950	566		−0.4%
1960	469		−17.1%
1970	415		−11.5%
1980	497		19.8%
1990	479		−3.6%
2000	533		11.3%
2010	548		2.8%
2020	489		−10.8%
2021 (est.)	496		1.4%
U.S. Decennial Census

== Demographics ==
As of the 2020 United States census, there were 489 people and 214 households in the town. There were 365 housing units.

The racial makeup of the town was 97.5% White, 0.4% from some other race, and 2.0% from two or more races. No residents identified as African American, Asian, or Native Hawaiian or Pacific Islander, alone or in combination with other races. Six residents identified as Native American in combination with other races. Hispanic or Latino residents of any race made up 1.0% of the population.

Of the 214 households, 49.1% were married couples, 39.3% included a person aged 65 or older, and 20.6% included one or more people under the age of 18. Of all households, 18.2% were men living alone and 12.6% were women living alone. Of all households, 6.5% were men living alone aged 65 or older and 7.0% were women living alone aged 65 or older.

The age distribution was 24.3% aged 65 or older and 79.3% aged 18 or older. The median age was 47.9 years.

Of the 365 housing units, 58.6% were occupied and 41.4% were vacant. Of all housing units, 32.1% were used for seasonal, recreational, or occasional purposes. The homeowner vacancy rate was 4.0% and the rental vacancy rate was 29.7%. Of the occupied units, 89.3% were owner-occupied and 10.7% were renter-occupied.

== Communities and locations in Grove ==
- Brewers Corners – A location in the center of the town at Johnson Hill Road and Ridge Road
- Grove – a hamlet near the south town line on County Route 15B (CR 15B, named Fink Hollow Road).
- Rosses – a hamlet at the north town line on NY 70. Part of the hamlet is located in Livingston County.
- Swain – a hamlet in the northeast corner of the town at the intersection of CR 24 and NY 70, named for Samuel Swain, a 19th-century surveyor and developer
- Swain Ski Resort – a skiing and snowboarding center near Swain that is the oldest operating ski resort in the state
