= New York State Route 70 =

State highway in western New York, US

New York State Route 70
- Map of the western Finger Lakes and Southern Tier regions with NY 70 highlighted in red

Route information
- Maintained by NYSDOT
- Length: 18.01 mi (28.98 km)
- Existed: 1930–present

Major junctions
- West end: NY 436 in Portage
- East end: NY 36 near Canaseraga

Location
- Country: United States
- State: New York
- Counties: Livingston, Allegany, Steuben

Highway system
- New York Highways; Interstate; US; State; Reference; Parkways
← NY 69A	→ NY 71

New York State Route 70 (NY 70) is a short state highway in the western portion of New York in the United States. It travels through three different counties in just 18.01 miles (28.98 km) and is the primary road to and from the village of Canaseraga. The western terminus of the route is at an intersection with NY 436 in the Livingston County town of Portage. Its eastern terminus is at a junction with NY 36 in the Steuben County town of Dansville. Although NY 70 is mostly signed north–south, it follows a more southeast–northwest alignment and is considered an east–west route by the New York State Department of Transportation (NYSDOT). The portion of the route between Dalton and Canaseraga parallels both Canaseraga Creek and the Norfolk Southern Railway's Southern Tier Line.

When the route was assigned as part of the 1930 renumbering of state highways in New York, it continued southeast from Canaseraga to Avoca by way of modern NY 961F and Steuben County's County Route 70A (CR 70A). Additionally, it briefly extended west from Garwoods to Old State Road in Granger. The route was cut back to Garwoods c. 1939 and to Arkport c. 1974. By 1977, NY 70 was reconfigured to extend from Portage to a junction east of Canaseraga, replacing part of NY 408 and all of New York State Route 70A and New York State Route 351. Reference markers for all three routes are still posted along NY 70.

== Route description ==
NY 70 is posted as a north–south highway; however, it is inventoried by NYSDOT as an east–west route, reflecting the route's more east–west than north–south alignment. As such, the route officially begins at an intersection with NY 436 in the town of Portage, located in southwestern Livingston County. It initially heads southward across open fields and past small wooded areas before curving to the east about 1 mile (1.6 km) later. The route continues in this direction for another 2 miles (3.2 km), intersecting the south end of CR 7 (Hunt Road) and the north end of CR 46 (Oakland Street) before crossing into the town of Nunda. Just east of the town line, NY 70 enters the hamlet of Dalton, where the highway connects to the southern terminus of NY 408 and the northern terminus of CR 24A (State Street) at a junction north of the community's center.

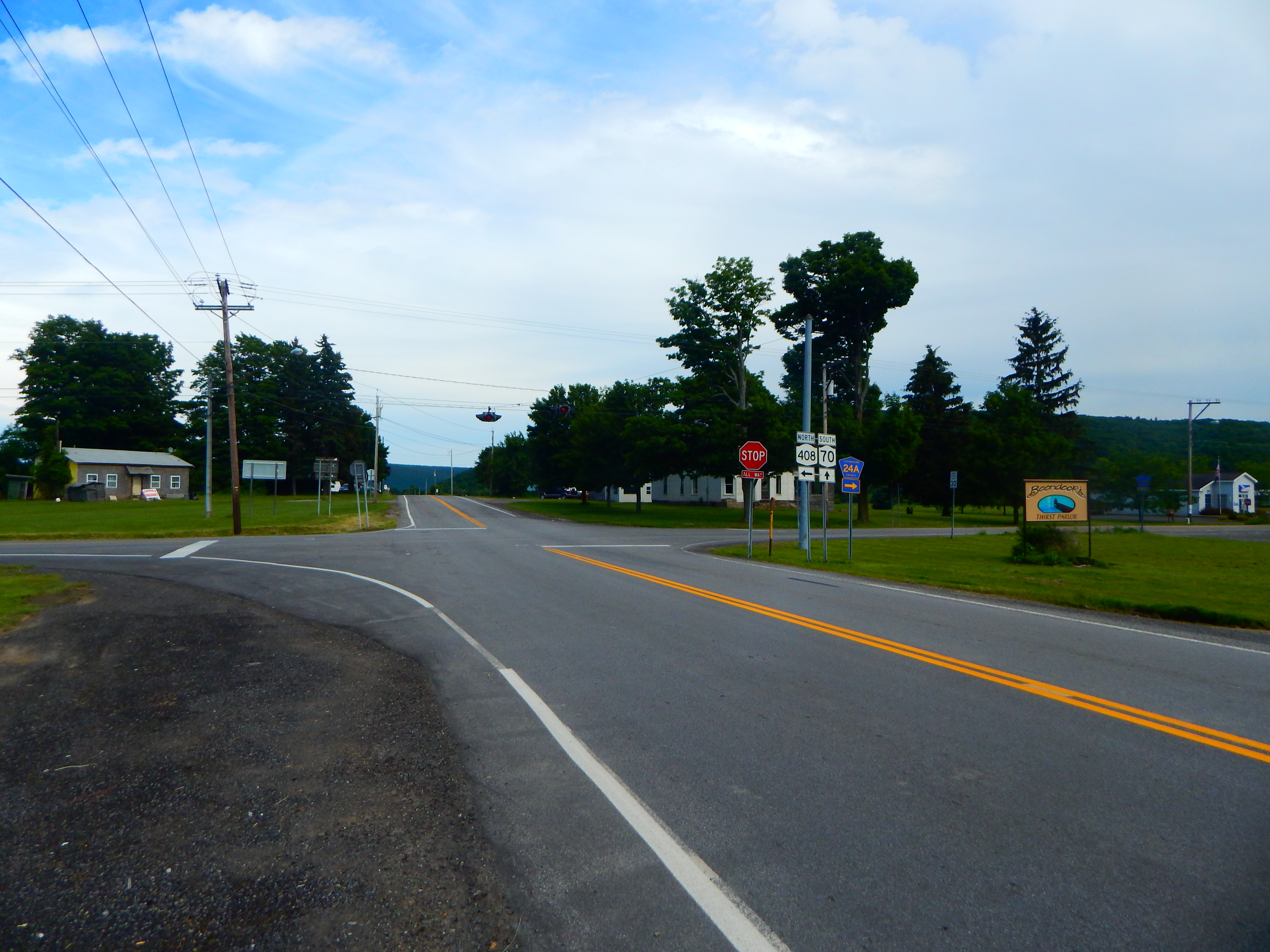
NY 70 approaching the junction with NY 408 and CR 24A in Dalton

From Dalton southeast to Canaseraga, NY 70 closely parallels the Norfolk Southern Railway's Southern Tier Line as both the road and the rail line run along the base of a valley surrounding Canaseraga Creek, the source of which is located roughly 3 miles (5 km) east of Dalton. The valley takes the route and the railroad southeastward into Allegany County, where they both pass through the towns of Grove and Burns. As NY 70 runs through the two towns, it serves the railside hamlets of Swain (in Grove) and Garwoods (in Burns), meeting CR 24 in the former and CR 15B in the latter. East of Garwoods, the creek curves to follow a more easterly track, and the valley, NY 70, and the Southern Tier Line all turn eastward to match the change in course. Just over 2 miles (3.2 km) from Garwoods is the creekside village of Canaseraga, a stark departure from the isolated, undeveloped areas that NY 70 serves west of this point.

The route intersects CR 13 and CR 13A (Church Street) in the center of the village before heading into another stretch of open areas east of the community. About 1 mile (1.6 km) east of Canaseraga, NY 70 intersects NY 961F, a reference route signed as a touring route. At this point, the Southern Tier Line heads south to follow NY 961F toward Hornell and Canaseraga Creek turns north toward the Livingston County village of Dansville. NY 70, meanwhile, continues generally eastward toward the Steuben County line, traversing a wide north–south gully that carries NY 36 from Hornell to Dansville. The eastern track eventually gives way to a northeasterly alignment as the highway crosses into Steuben County and its town of Dansville. NY 70 ends just 0.24 miles (0.4 km) into the county at an intersection with NY 36 near the eastern edge of the valley in the hamlet of Dotys Corners.

== History ==
New York State Route 70A
- Location: Canaseraga–Dansville
- Existed: c. 1931–July 1, 1974

The origins of NY 70 date back to the mid-1920s when a series of state highways extending from Belvidere in the west to Penn Yan in the east were designated NY 38. In between the two endpoints, NY 38 served the communities of Garwoods, Canaseraga, Arkport, Hornell, Avoca, and Bath. NY 38 was reassigned to another highway in Central New York as part of the 1930 renumbering of state highways in New York, and its former alignment in the Southern Tier became part of several new routes. Southwest of Garwoods, the highway was included as part of NY 63 from Belvidere to Angelica and NY 63A between Angelica and Garwoods. The portion of old NY 38 northeast of Bath became NY 54.

From Garwoods to NY 2 (now NY 415) south of Avoca, the former routing of NY 38 was included as part of NY 70, which continued west from Garwoods to NY 63 (now Old State Road) in Granger. NY 70 initially used modern NY 961F, NY 36, and Big Creek Road (Steuben County's CR 70A) east of Canaseraga, as did its predecessor, NY 38. West of Garwoods, NY 70 followed Ames Nichols and Swain roads to Spencer Worden Road, from where the route was to continue west to NY 63 by way of an extension of Swain Road. The extension of Swain Road never materialized; as a result, NY 70 was cut back to its junction with NY 63A (now Allegany County's CR 15B) in Garwoods c. 1939.

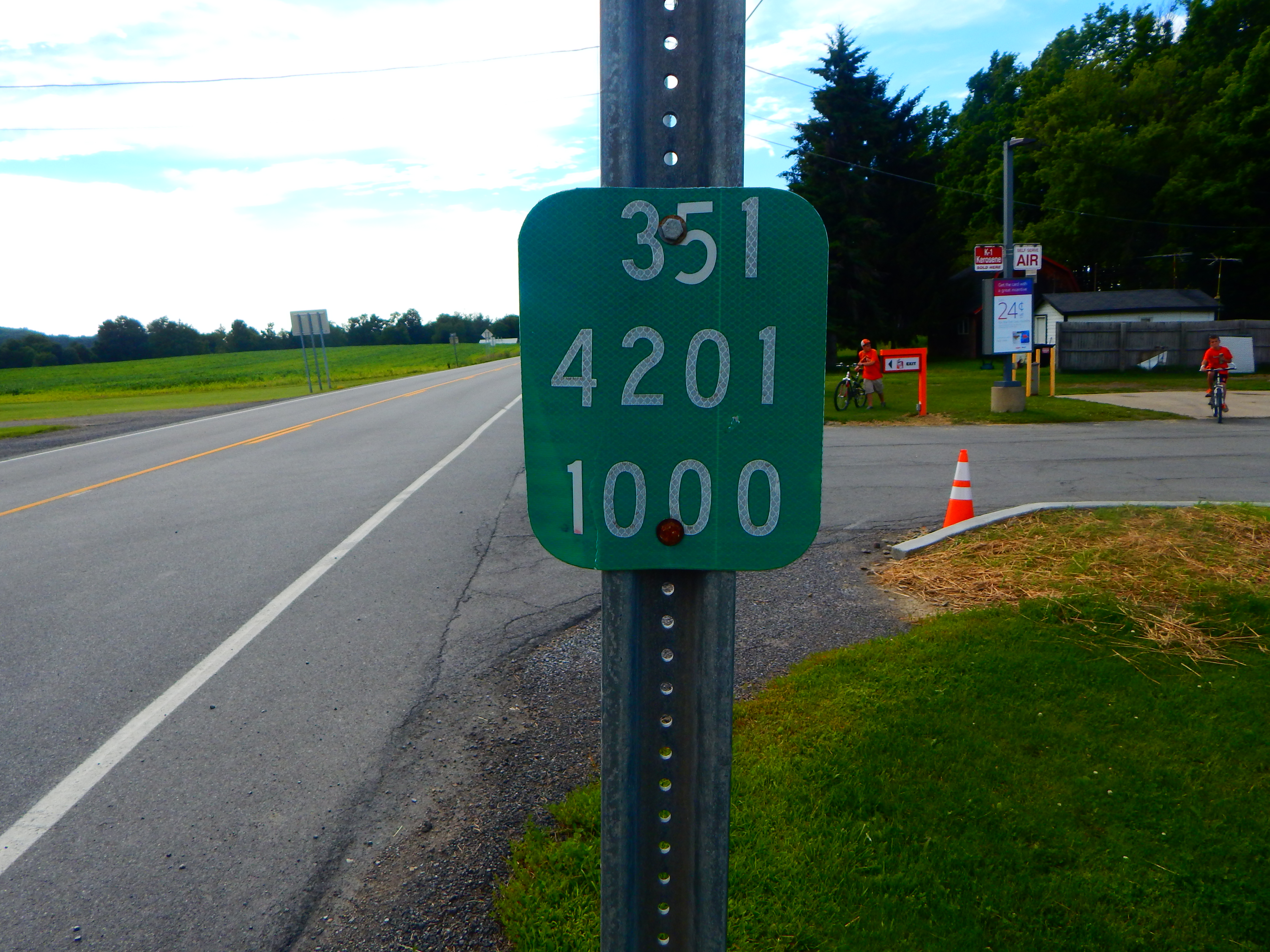
NY 351 reference marker on NY 70 in Dalton

Most of what later became NY 70 was given a route designation at some point in the early 1930s. In the 1930 renumbering, the portion of current NY 70 between NY 63 (now NY 408) in Dalton and the then-western terminus of NY 70 in Garwoods was designated as part of NY 63A. By the following year, the remainder of what is now NY 70 west to NY 39 (modern NY 436) was designated NY 351 while the short east–west connector between Canaseraga and Dansville was assigned NY 70A. In the early 1940s, NY 63 was rerouted south of Mount Morris and replaced with NY 408 between Scotts Corners (north of Hinsdale) and Mount Morris. As part of the switch, NY 63A was redesignated NY 408A. NY 408 was rerouted between Angelica and Dalton to follow NY 408A on January 1, 1949.

NY 70 remained unchanged until the 1970s when the route was reconfigured into its modern alignment through a series of changes. The first was made c. 1974 when the route was truncated westward to Arkport following the completion of the Southern Tier Expressway between Hornell and Avoca. NY 408 was truncated to Dalton on its southern end. The Dalton–Garwoods segment of NY 408's former routing and all of NY 351 became a western extension of NY 70. The route was also realigned on its east end by this time to follow the routing of NY 70A east of Canaseraga.

== Major intersections ==
County	Location	mi	km	Destinations	Notes
Livingston	Portage	0.00	0.00	NY 436 – Portageville, Letchworth State Park, Nunda	Western terminus
Livingston	Town of Nunda	3.31	5.33	NY 408 / CR 24A (State Street) – Nunda, Dalton	Southern terminus of NY 408; hamlet of Dalton
Allegany	Burns	12.41	19.97	CR 15B – Garwoods	Hamlet of Garwoods; formerly part of NY 408
Allegany	Burns	16.26	26.17	NY 961F south (Arkport–Canaseraga Road)	Former routing of NY 70; northern terminus of NY 961F
Steuben	Dansville	18.01	28.98	NY 36 – Dansville, Hornell	Eastern terminus; hamlet of Dotys Corners
1.000 mi = 1.609 km; 1.000 km = 0.621 mi

== See also ==
- List of county routes in Steuben County, New York
