= List of county routes in Allegany County, New York =

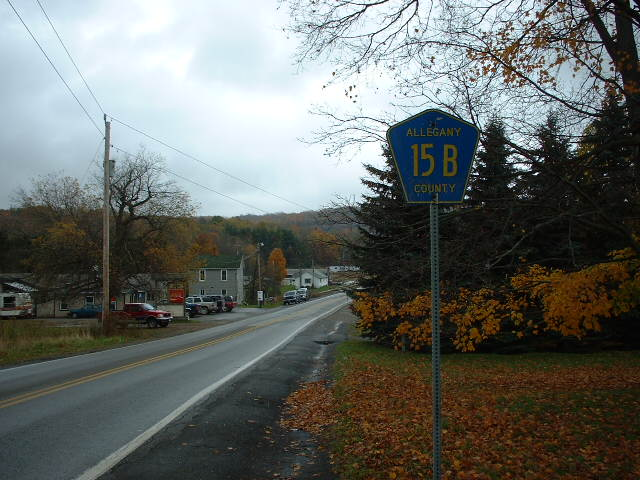
Signage in Allegany County along CR 15B

County routes in Allegany County, New York, are signed with the Manual on Uniform Traffic Control Devices-standard yellow-on-blue pentagon route marker. The signing of county routes in Allegany County began in 1957, as part of a sponsored project with volunteer firefighters.

== Route list ==
| Route | Length (mi) | Length (km) | From | Via | To | Notes |
|---|---|---|---|---|---|---|
| CR 1 | 6.43 | 10.35 | NY 305 in Clarksville | West Clarksville and Clarksville roads | NY 275 in Friendship | |
| CR 2 | 13.71 | 22.06 | CR 16 in Angelica | Karr Valley Road | NY 962A at I-86 / NY 17 exit 33 in Almond | A section of CR 2 extending into Almond village was turned over to the municipality on August 1, 1967. |
| CR 2A | 5.64 | 9.08 | CR 16 in West Almond | Camp Road | CR 2 in Almond | |
| CR 2B | 4.75 | 7.64 | NY 244 in Amity | Baker Valley Road | CR 2 in West Almond | |
| CR 3 | 8.53 | 13.73 | Cattaraugus County line in Centerville (becomes CR 23) | Buffalo Road | NY 19 in Hume | |
| CR 4 | 5.30 | 8.53 | NY 19 / NY 19A in Hume | Snyder Hill Road | CR 15 in Granger | A section of CR 4 extending into Fillmore was turned over to the municipality on August 1, 1967. |
| CR 5 | 6.97 | 11.22 | NY 417 in Genesee | Obi and Daggett Hollow roads | NY 305 in Clarksville | |
| CR 5A | 2.12 | 3.41 | CR 5 in Genesee | Salt Rising | Bolivar village line in Bolivar | |
| CR 5B | 1.17 | 1.88 | CR 34 / CR 40 | Messer Hill Road in Wirt | Dead end | |
| CR 5C | 0.49 | 0.79 | CR 5 | Hall Road in Genesee | NY 417 | |
| CR 6 | 4.76 | 7.66 | Cattaraugus County line in Clarksville (becomes CR 27) | Haskell Road | NY 305 in Cuba | |
| CR 6S | 0.19 | 0.31 | CR 6 | Haskell Road in Cuba | NY 305 | |
| CR 7 | 3.09 | 4.97 | Cattaraugus County line in New Hudson (becomes CR 25) | Rawson Road | NY 305 in Cuba | |
| CR 7A | 2.55 | 4.10 | Cattaraugus County line (becomes CR 25) | Rawson Road in New Hudson | Cattaraugus County line (becomes CR 46) | Includes spur (Lyndon Center Road) to Cattaraugus CR 47 |
| CR 7B | 4.00 | 6.44 | CR 7A | Hardy Corners Road in Rushford | West Branch Road | |
| CR 7C | 0.45 | 0.72 | Cattaraugus County line (becomes CR 24) | Abbott Road in Cuba | CR 7D | |
| CR 7D | 1.57 | 2.53 | Cattaraugus County line (becomes CR 50) | West Shore Road in Cuba | CR 7 | |
| CR 7E | 0.33 | 0.53 | CR 7B | Beaumont Street in Rushford | Upper Street | |
| CR 8 | 6.54 | 10.53 | NY 275 | Inavale Road in Wirt | NY 275 | |
| CR 9 | 5.99 | 9.64 | NY 417 | Knight Creek Road in Scio | NY 19 / CR 10 | |
| CR 10 | 10.88 | 17.51 | NY 19 / CR 9 in Scio | Vandermark Road | NY 244 / CR 11 in Alfred | |
| CR 10S | 0.12 | 0.19 | CR 10 | Old County Road 10 in Scio | Dead end | |
| CR 11 | 6.88 | 11.07 | NY 244 / CR 10 in Alfred | McHenry Valley Road | Almond village line in Almond | |
| CR 12 | 7.77 | 12.50 | NY 417 in Andover | Elm Valley Road | Alfred village line in Alfred | A section of CR 12 extending into Alfred village was turned over to the municipality on August 1, 1967. |
| CR 13 | 2.07 | 3.33 | North Hill Road in Burns | South Valley Road | NY 70 / CR 13A in Canaseraga | |
| CR 13A | 0.78 | 1.26 | NY 70 / CR 13 in Canaseraga | North Church Street and Ossian Road | Livingston County line in Burns | |
| CR 13B | 1.35 | 2.17 | CR 13A in Canaseraga | Mill Street | Livingston County line in Burns (becomes CR 70) | |
| CR 13C | 3.28 | 5.28 | Friener Road | Slader Creek Road in Burns | CR 13 | |
| CR 14 | 0.58 | 0.93 | NY 961F | Burns Road in Burns | Steuben County line (becomes CR 52) | |
| CR 15 | 15.11 | 24.32 | CR 16 in Angelica | Old State and Basswood Hill roads | Livingston County line in Granger (becomes CR 20) | Old State Road portion was formerly part of NY 408 |
| CR 15A | 9.55 | 15.37 | CR 15 in Allen | Fink Hollow Road | CR 15B in Grove | |
| CR 15B | 7.55 | 12.15 | CR 16 in Birdsall | Malone Road | NY 70 in Burns | Formerly part of NY 408 |
| CR 16 | 21.72 | 34.95 | NY 19 in Belfast | Dalton Bridge and Dalton roads | Livingston County line in Grove (becomes CR 24) | Discontinuous at Angelica village limits; part between Angelica and CR 15B was formerly part of NY 408 |
| CR 17 | 8.64 | 13.90 | North Branch Road in Friendship | White Creek Road | NY 19 in Belfast | |
| CR 17S | 0.34 | 0.55 | CR 17 | Old County Road 17 in Belfast | CR 17 | |
| CR 18 | 12.21 | 19.65 | Pennsylvania state line in Bolivar | Petrolia Road | NY 417 in Wellsville | |
| CR 19 | 3.35 | 5.39 | Pennsylvania state line | Spring Mills Road in Independence | NY 248 | |
| CR 19A | 0.22 | 0.35 | CR 19 | Rexville Road in Independence | Steuben County line (becomes CR 124) | |
| CR 20 | 16.23 | 26.12 | Cuba village line in Cuba | Friendship and Gibson Hill roads | Angelica village line in Angelica | Formerly part of NY 408; A section of CR 4 extending into Angelica village was turned over to the municipality on August 1, 1967. |
| CR 20S | 0.15 | 0.24 | CR 20 | Old County Road 20 in Friendship | CR 20 | |
| CR 21 | 2.42 | 3.89 | NY 417 | Shovel Hollow Road in Andover | Steuben County line (becomes CR 28) | |
| CR 22 | 7.18 | 11.56 | NY 248 in Independence | Independence Road | Andover village line in Andover | |
| CR 22A | 1.81 | 2.91 | CR 22 | Independence Road in Independence | Steuben County line (becomes CR 59) | |
| CR 23 | 8.51 | 13.70 | NY 243 in Rushford | Hume Road | NY 19 in Hume | |
| CR 24 | 6.27 | 10.09 | CR 16 | Swain Road in Grove | NY 70 | |
| CR 25 | 2.11 | 3.40 | Oil Springs Reservation boundary | South Shore Road in Cuba | NY 305 | |
| CR 26 | 4.11 | 6.61 | CR 16 in Angelica | Belfast and Belfast Road | NY 19 in Belfast | |
| CR 26S | 0.30 | 0.48 | CR 26 | Old County Road 26 in Belfast | CR 26 | |
| CR 27 | 2.12 | 3.41 | NY 19A | Wiscoy Road in Hume | Wyoming County line (becomes CR 29) | |
| CR 27B | 3.00 | 4.83 | CR 4 in Hume | Ballard Road | Otis Smith Road in Granger | |
| CR 28 | 0.98 | 1.58 | Wellsville village line | East State Street in Wellsville | NY 417 | |
| CR 29 | 5.54 | 8.92 | Pennsylvania state line in Alma | Eleven Mile Road | NY 19 / CR 39 in Willing | |
| CR 30 | 7.90 | 12.71 | NY 417 in Wellsville | Trapping Brook Road | CR 22 in Andover | |
| CR 31 | 8.73 | 14.05 | CR 20 in Friendship | Middaugh Hill Road | CR 9 in Scio | |
| CR 31A | 4.75 | 7.64 | CR 31 in Friendship | Corbin Hill Road | NY 19 in Amity | |
| CR 32 | 5.12 | 8.24 | Bush Road | North Almond Valley Road in Almond | Steuben County line (becomes CR 67) | |
| CR 33 | 5.13 | 8.26 | CR 18 | South Bolivar Road in Bolivar | Olive Street | |
| CR 34 | 6.73 | 10.83 | CR 5B / CR 40 in Richburg | Evans Street and West Notch Road | CR 1 in Friendship | Section east of Hartland Ames Road was designated as part of NY 276 from 1930 until ca. 1939. (Note: NY 276 continued west along Harland-Ames Road, Monahan Road, and Steward Road to NY 305, and NY 276 continued east along Mill Road to NY 275.) |
| CR 35 | 0.56 | 0.90 | NY 19 | Genesee Street in Caneadea | Centerville Road | |
| CR 36 | 4.22 | 6.79 | Fairview Road | Pike Road in Centerville | Wyoming County line (becomes CR 21) | |
| CR 38 | 6.03 | 9.70 | CR 18 in Alma | Four Mile Road | CR 29 in Willing | |
| CR 39 | 7.00 | 11.27 | NY 19 / CR 29 in Willing | Beech Hill Road | NY 248 in Independence | |
| CR 40 | 7.30 | 11.75 | NY 305 in Clarksville | Richburg Road and Reed Street | NY 275 in Bolivar | |
| CR 41 | 5.04 | 8.11 | NY 305 in New Hudson | Tibbetts Hill Road | CR 17 in Belfast | |
| CR 42 | 1.13 | 1.82 | NY 21 / NY 961G | Alfred Station Road in Alfred | Steuben County line (becomes CR 68) | |
| CR 43 | 2.12 | 3.41 | CR 20 | Camp Road in Angelica | Old State Road | |
| CR 44 | 0.83 | 1.34 | Weidrick Road | Sinclair Road in Wellsville | Wellsville village line | |
| CR 46 | 0.59 | 0.95 | NY 19 | East Hill Road in Caneadea | East River Road | |
| CR 48 | 3.22 | 5.18 | NY 244 in Belmont | Triana Street and River Road | CR 20 in Angelica | A section of CR 48 extending into Belmont was turned over to the municipality on August 1, 1967. |
| CR 49 | 6.38 | 10.27 | NY 243 in Rushford | Hillcrest Road | NY 19 in Caneadea | The road was added to the county highway system in April 1949. |
| CR 50 | 1.19 | 1.92 | Pennsylvania state line | O'Donnell Road in Willing | NY 19 | |

== See also ==
- County routes in New York
