= Coopersville =

Coopersville or Cooperville may refer to a location in the United States:

- Cooperville, Georgia
- Coopersville, Kentucky in Wayne County, Kentucky
- Coopersville, Louisiana in Iberia Parish, Louisiana
- Coopersville, Maryland in Baltimore County, Maryland
- Coopersville, Michigan in Ottawa County, Michigan
- Coopersville, New Jersey in Warren County, New Jersey
- Coopersville, New York (disambiguation) (multiple)
- Coopersville, Ohio in Pike County, Ohio
- Coopersville, Pennsylvania in Lancaster County, Pennsylvania
