= New York State Route 436 =

State highway in western New York, US

New York State Route 436
- Map of western New York with NY 436 highlighted in red

Route information
- Maintained by NYSDOT and Wyoming County
- Length: 23.80 mi (38.30 km)
- Existed: August 1971–present

Major junctions
- West end: NY 39 in Pike
- NY 408 in Nunda
- East end: NY 36 in Dansville

Location
- Country: United States
- State: New York
- Counties: Wyoming, Livingston

Highway system
- New York Highways; Interstate; US; State; Reference; Parkways
← NY 434	→ NY 437

New York State Route 436 (NY 436) is an east–west state highway located in the western portion of New York in the United States. It extends for 23.80 miles (38.30 km) from an intersection with NY 39 in the Pike hamlet of Lamont to a junction with NY 36 in the village of Dansville. In between, the route passes through Letchworth State Park near its southern tip and serves the village of Nunda, where it meets NY 408. NY 436 also passes through the hamlet of Portageville, located at the southern end of Letchworth State Park on NY 19A, which NY 436 overlaps north of the community. Most of NY 436 is a two-lane highway that traverses largely rural areas of Wyoming and Livingston counties.

The portion of NY 436 between Portageville and Nunda was originally part of Route 43, an unsigned legislative route, during the 1910s and 1920s. In the 1930 renumbering of state highways in New York, all of modern NY 436 east of Portageville became part of NY 39, which initially went east from the now-hamlet of Pike to Dansville. NY 39 was replaced east of Pike with NY 245 c. 1940 after the alignments of the two routes were mostly swapped. NY 245 was truncated to begin in Naples in August 1971, at which time the Pike–Dansville segment of its former routing became NY 436. The westernmost piece of NY 436 was altered in the mid-1970s to use NY 19A and a Wyoming County-maintained road to reach NY 39.

== Route description ==
=== Portageville area ===
NY 436 begins at an intersection with NY 39 in Lamont, a hamlet within the town of Pike in Wyoming County. It initially heads eastward on Denton Corners Road, overlapping with County Route 38 (CR 38) as it traverses a mixture of open fields and farmland and enters the town of Genesee Falls. After 1.75 miles (2.82 km), NY 436 intersects NY 19A at a four-way intersection. While CR 38 continues eastward into Letchworth State Park, NY 436 turns to the south, initially following NY 19A around the southwestern tip of the park. Both routes eventually enter the park, however, as they approach the hamlet of Portageville, a community situated at the park's southern end. At this point, the mostly east–west NY 436 leaves the predominantly north–south NY 19A, allowing the latter to take the southern path out of town and parallel the Genesee River as it travels southward. NY 436, meanwhile, turns eastward to follow the northern edge of Portageville.

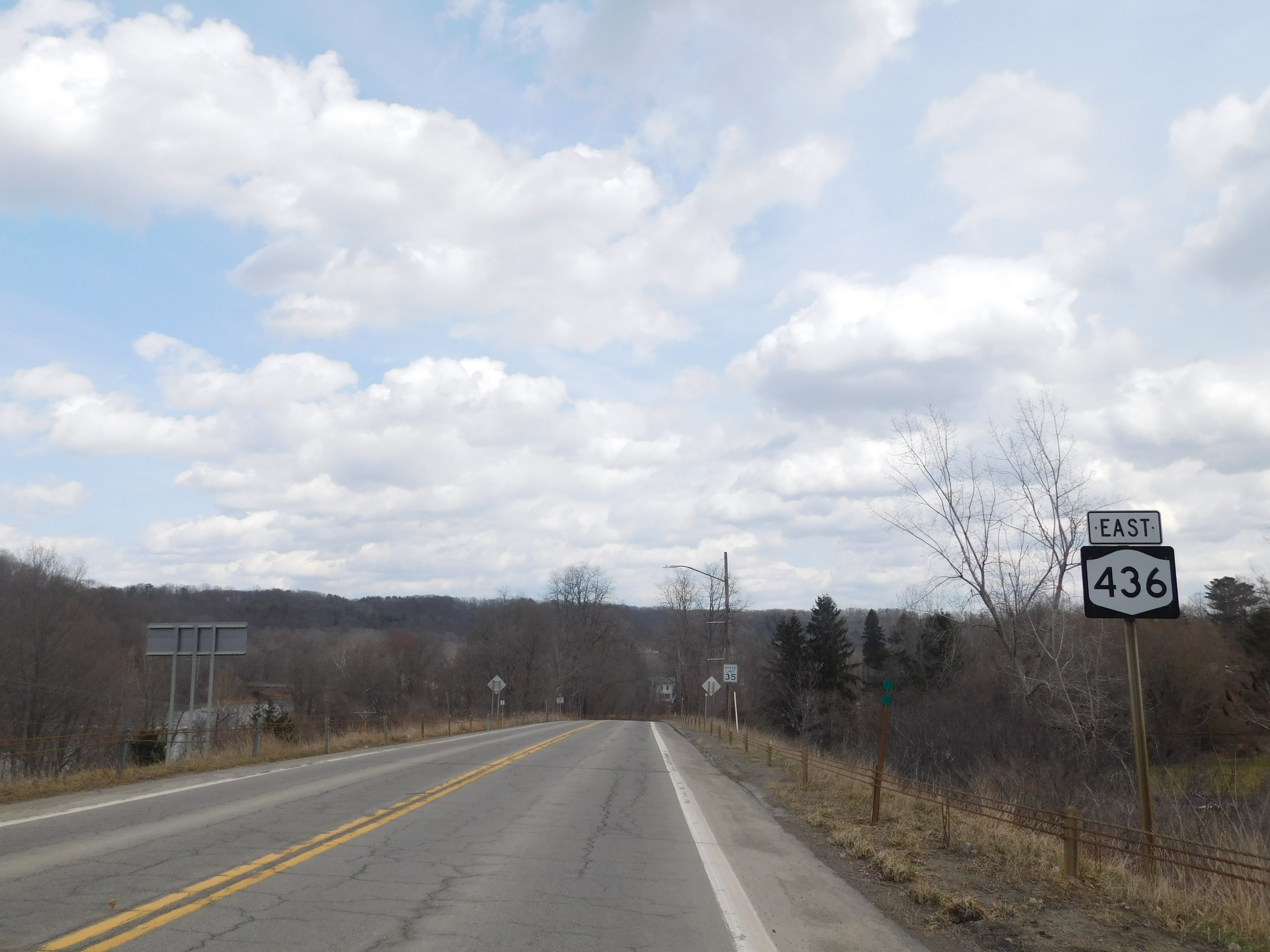
NY 436 eastbound in Genesee Falls

The route occupies the northernmost road in Portageville between NY 19A and Main Street, one that is initially devoid of development due to its proximity to the Genesee River gorge. As NY 436 approaches Main Street, it trends slightly southward to serve a small handful of homes. At Main Street, NY 436 abruptly turns north and crosses the Genesee River gorge, reentering Letchworth State Park as it passes into Livingston County and the town of Portage. Across the river, the route gradually turns to the east as it ascends the side of the gorge and passes under the Norfolk Southern Railway-owned Southern Tier Line. NY 436 leaves both Letchworth State Park and the Genesee River shortly afterward.

=== Nunda to Dansville ===
East of the park, NY 436 straightens out and takes an easterly alignment across open, cultivated fields to an intersection west of the Portage hamlet of Oakland, where the road meets the western terminus of NY 70. From here, NY 436 curves to the northeast for a short distance before resuming its eastward routing through the small hamlet of Oakland and into the town of Nunda. Just 1 mile (1.6 km) east of Oakland is the village of Nunda, which NY 436 enters as Portage Road. It proceeds eastward into the village center, where it connects to NY 408, the village's main north–south highway. While NY 408 heads through Nunda's linear commercial district, NY 436 continues east through a more residential portion of the village as Mill Street.

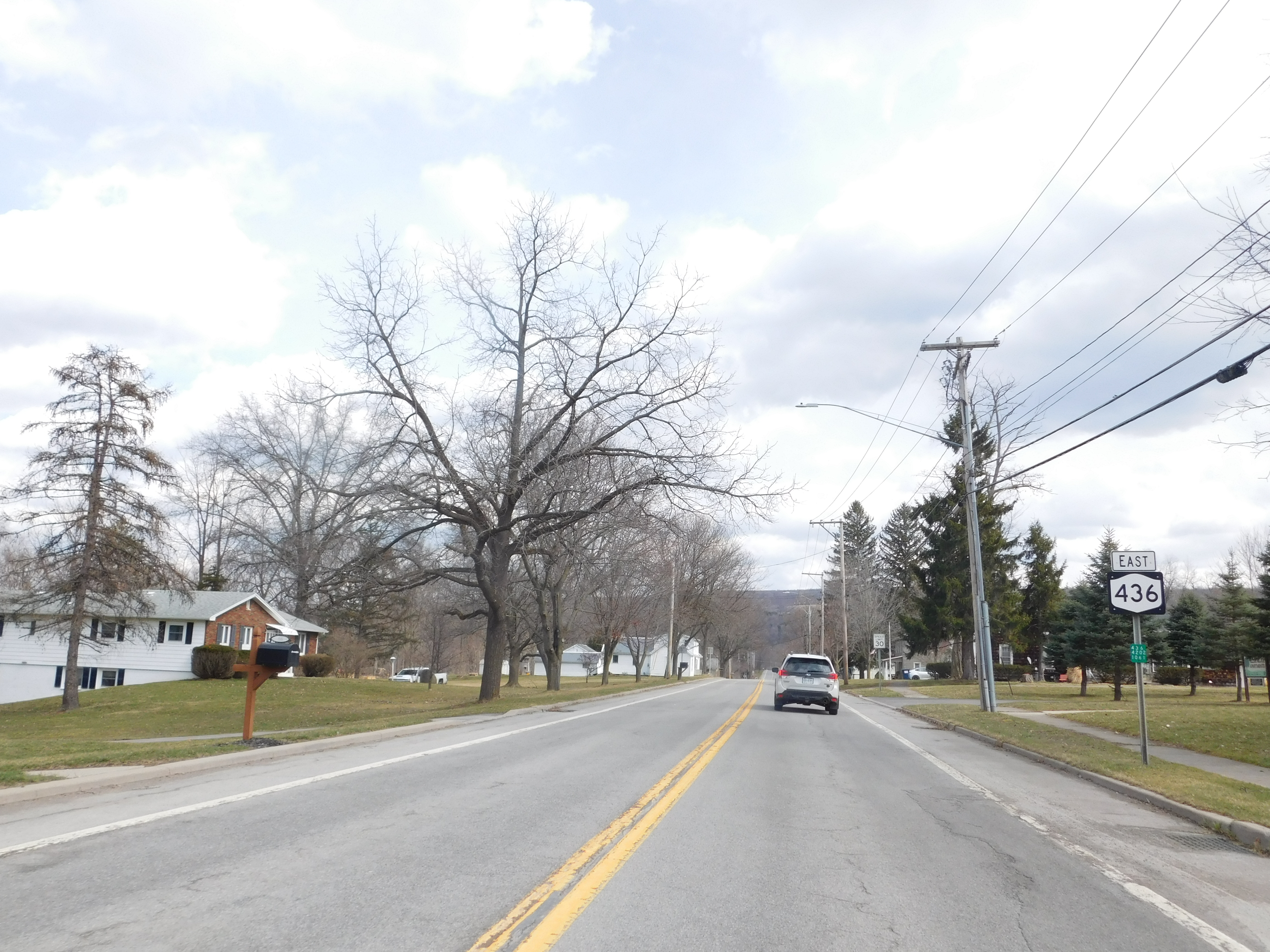
NY 436 eastbound in the hamlet of Oakland

Outside of Nunda, NY 436 switches names once again to Nunda–Dansville Road, named for the two communities that the last segment of the road links. 1 mile (1.6 km) east of NY 408, NY 436 dips to the south for another mile, ascending in elevation as it climbs the side of a ridge overlooking the village of Nunda. It curves back to the east at the top of the ridge and generally maintains an east–west alignment for the rest of its length. The route winds its way across a mixture of farmlands and undeveloped areas in the towns of Ossian and North Dansville to the village of Dansville, where NY 436 passes under Interstate 390 on Ossian Street before ending two long blocks later at Dock Street, designated as NY 36. At this point, NY 36 leaves Dock Street and continues eastward on Ossian Street toward the village center.

== History ==
The portion of modern NY 436 between Portageville Road northeast of Portageville and NY 408 in Nunda was originally designated as part of Route 43, an unsigned legislative route, by the New York State Legislature in 1911. The route also included the section of modern NY 408 linking Nunda to Mount Morris. On March 1, 1921, the route was extended southwestward along what is now NY 436 to meet Route 16 (now NY 19A) in Portageville. When the first set of posted routes in New York were assigned in 1924, no part of today's NY 436 was assigned a designation; in fact, by 1926, only two segments were state-maintained: the piece originally designated as part of legislative Route 43 and the section that now overlaps with NY 19A.

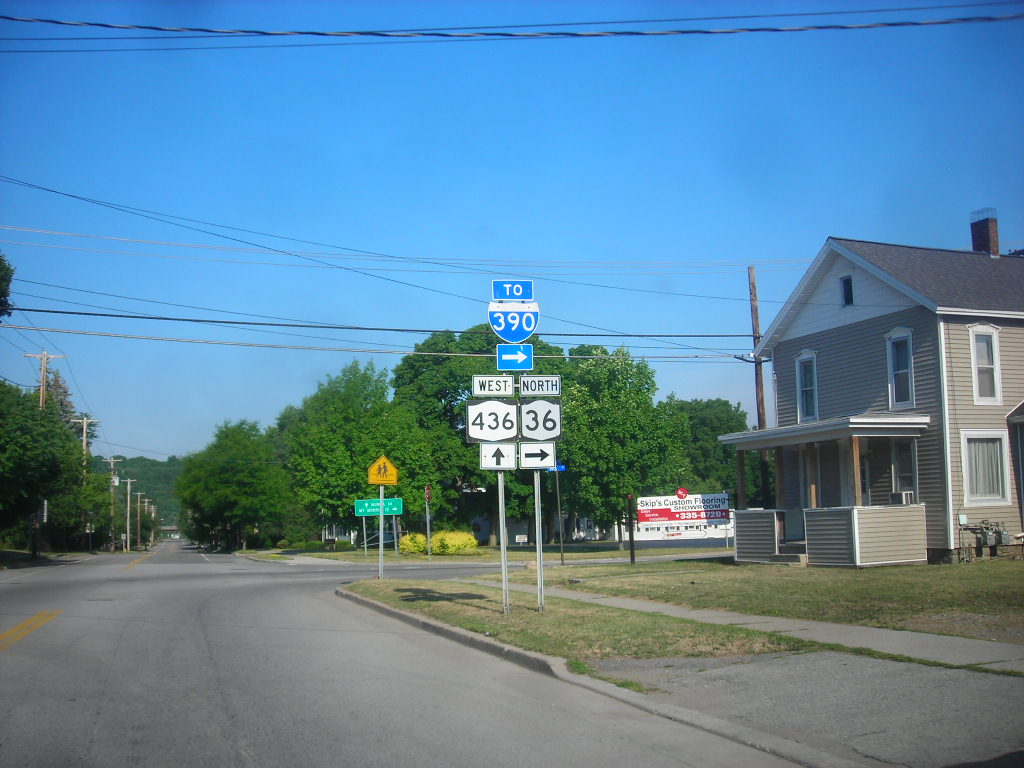
Eastern terminus of NY 436 in Dansville, as seen from NY 36 northbound

In the 1930 renumbering of state highways in New York, the Portageville–Nunda leg of former legislative Route 43 became part of the new NY 39, which continued west to the now-hamlet of Pike along Griffith Road and east on current NY 436 to Dansville. Also assigned as part of the renumbering was NY 245, a route extending from then-NY 39 in Pike to Perry Center on modern NY 39 and NY 246. NY 245 was rerouted c. 1934 to follow a new highway (modern NY 39) northeast from Perry to a new terminus at Pine Tavern. The alignments of NY 39 and NY 245 east of Pike were mostly swapped c. 1940, placing NY 39 on its modern alignment and NY 245 on the east–west highway linking Portageville to Dansville. NY 245 initially bypassed Griffith Road by way of NY 436's modern routing on NY 19A and Denton Corners Road; however, NY 245 was reconfigured to use NY 39's old alignment along Griffith Road instead by 1947.

NY 245 was routed off Nunda–Dansville Road for a brief period during the 1950s. It was realigned in the late 1940s to follow NY 408 north from Nunda to the hamlet of Brooks Grove, where it would continue to Dansville by way of overlaps with NY 258 and NY 36. NY 245 was returned to its original alignment between the two locations in the late 1950s. The Pike–Dansville portion of NY 245 remained virtually unchanged until August 1971, when NY 245 was truncated to begin at its junction with NY 21 in Naples. The former routing of NY 245 between Pike and Dansville was subsequently redesignated as NY 436. NY 436 was rerouted follow its current alignment west of Portageville in the mid-1970s. The piece of NY 436 east of NY 408 in Nunda was county-maintained until April 1, 1983, when the state of New York acquired the highway as part of a highway maintenance swap between the state and Livingston County.

== Major intersections ==
County	Location	mi	km	Destinations	Notes
Wyoming	Pike	0.00	0.00	NY 39 – Castile	Western terminus; hamlet of Lamont
Wyoming	Genesee Falls	1.79	2.88	NY 19A north – Castile	Northern terminus of NY 19A / NY 436 overlap
Wyoming	Genesee Falls	3.92	6.31	NY 19A south – Fillmore	Hamlet of Portageville; southern terminus of NY 19A / NY 436 overlap
Livingston	Portage	7.24	11.65	NY 70 east – Swain	Western terminus of NY 70
Livingston	Village of Nunda	9.94	16.00	NY 408 – Mount Morris, Dalton	
Livingston	Dansville	23.80	38.30	NY 36 to I-390 – Mount Morris	Eastern terminus
1.000 mi = 1.609 km; 1.000 km = 0.621 mi: Concurrency terminus
