= Coopersville, New York =

Coopersville, New York may refer to:

- Coopersville, Clinton County, New York
- Coopersville, Livingston County, New York
