= County routes in New York =

Part of the series on
Highways in New York

Interstate Highways

U.S. Routes

State routes (former)

Reference routes

County routes

Parkways

In the U.S. state of New York, county routes exist in all 62 counties except those in the five boroughs of New York City. Most are maintained locally by county highway departments. County route designations are assigned at the county level; as a result, routes often change numbers as they cross from one county to the next due to the lack of a statewide numbering system and lack of coordination between counties. Some exceptions exist, such as County Route 36 (CR 36) in Ontario County and CR 36A in Livingston County. The assignment of routes by individual counties also results in varying system density and numbering and signage practices between the state's counties.

== Numbering and layout ==
The exact method of county route numbering varies by county. Some counties, such as Dutchess County, use a system in which county route numbers are assigned by town in alphabetical order while others like Monroe County assign numbers in a general west-to-east fashion. Still others, for instance Livingston County, have no defined pattern. The highest-numbered posted county route and the only four-digit county route signed as such in the state, CR 1345, resides in Saratoga County.

Like the numbering system and the choice of signage, the complexity of the county highway system varies by county as well. Erie County, for example, one of the most urbanized counties in Upstate New York, maintains a system of nearly 400 routes. In contrast, the Southern Tier county of Tioga manages only 29 roads.

== Signage ==
The method that each county employs to sign its routes varies from one county to the next. The majority of counties in New York use the MUTCD-standard blue pentagonal shield with yellow lettering. Others tweak this shield slightly, using white lettering instead of yellow (particularly in areas near the Capital District) or using shapes similar to a pentagon. Additionally, Orange County employs a wide assortment of signage, ranging from the standard blue pentagonal shield to a blue diamond with white lettering. On the other hand, some counties, such as Orleans and Westchester counties, do not post signage along their routes. Most of New York switched to the MUTCD-standard blue pentagon shield ca. 1974. Signs that predate this transition can still be found in certain areas of the state.

Variations of county route signage in New York
MUTCD-standard route marker for CR 62 in Livingston County.

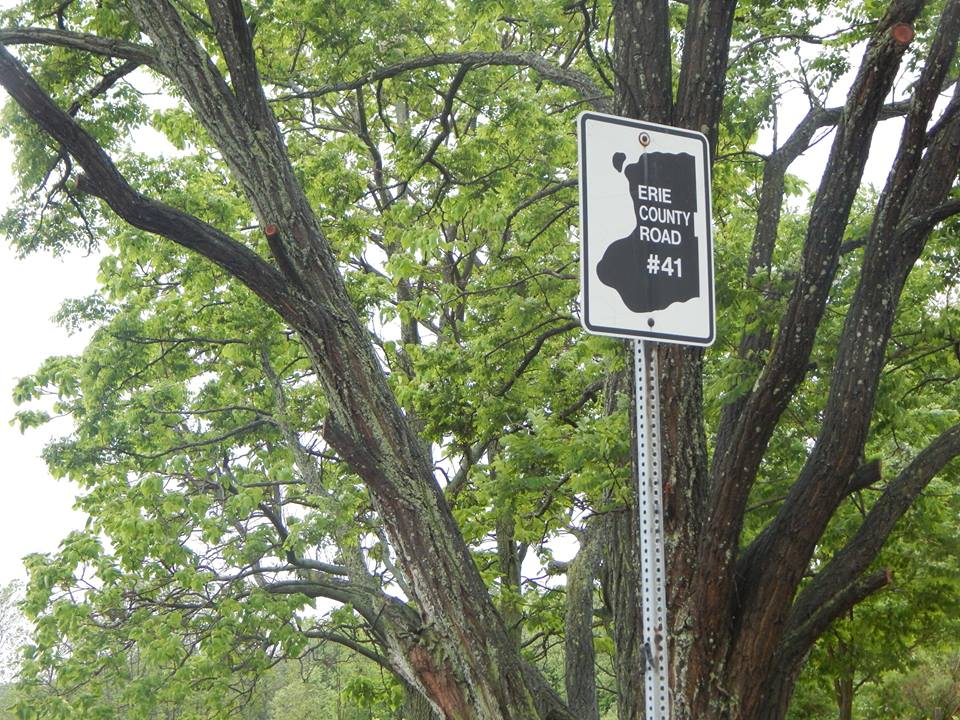
Standard route marker for CR 41 in Erie County.

Blade sign for Ridge Road (CR 143) in Wayne County, one of several counties that do not post route numbers on standalone shields.

Pre-MUTCD standard route marker for CR 32 in Otsego County. Most of the county now uses the standard pentagon.

Example of a county route marker used by Nassau County for its county routes prior to the mid-1970s. No signs are currently displayed in the county.

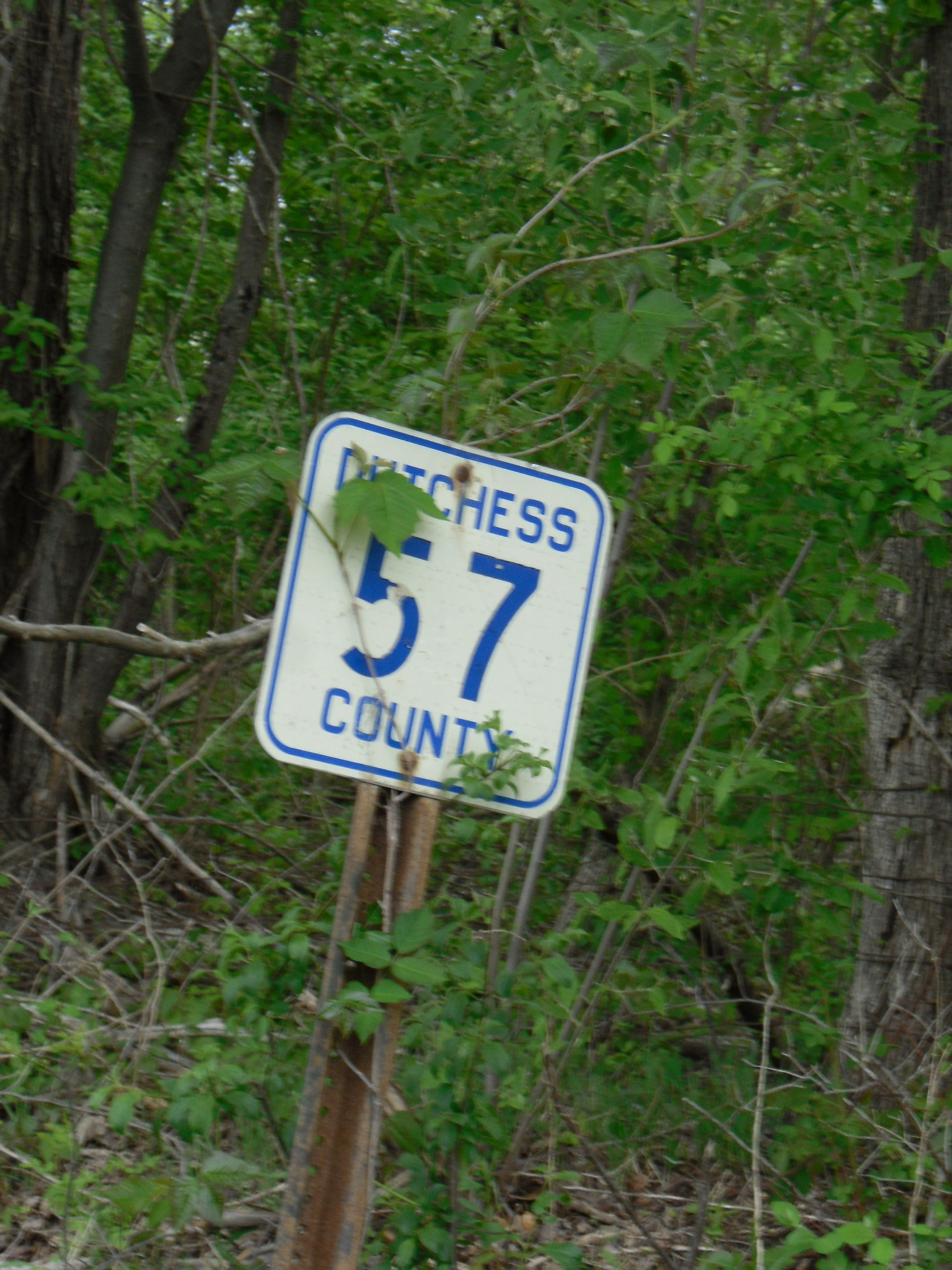
Pre-MUTCD standard route marker for CR 57 in Dutchess County. Most of the county now uses the standard pentagon.

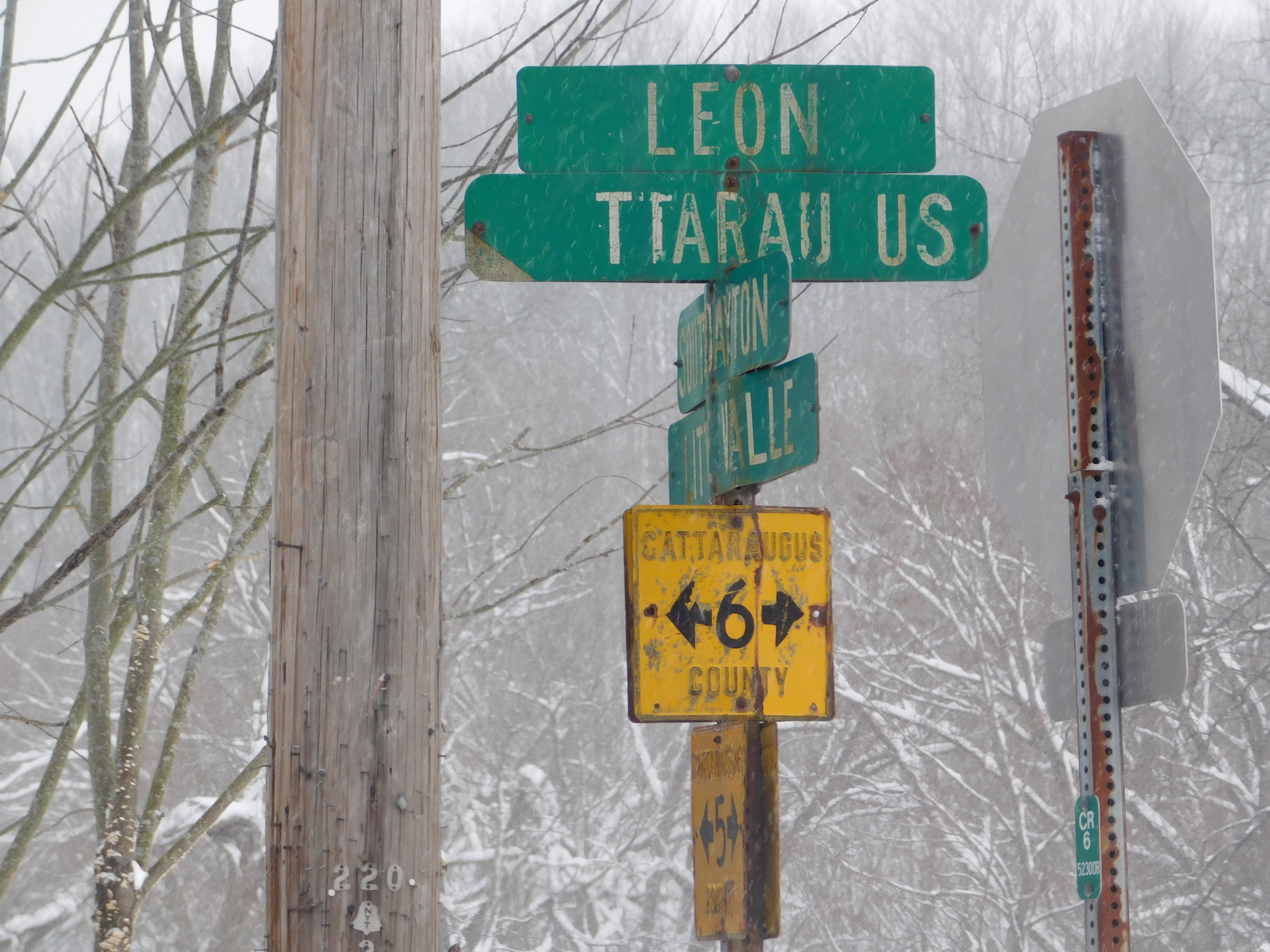
Example of a county route marker and fingerposts used by Cattaraugus County for its county routes prior to the late 1990s. The county now uses the standard pentagon; remaining older markers and fingerposts, including this New Albion example, have been left standing.

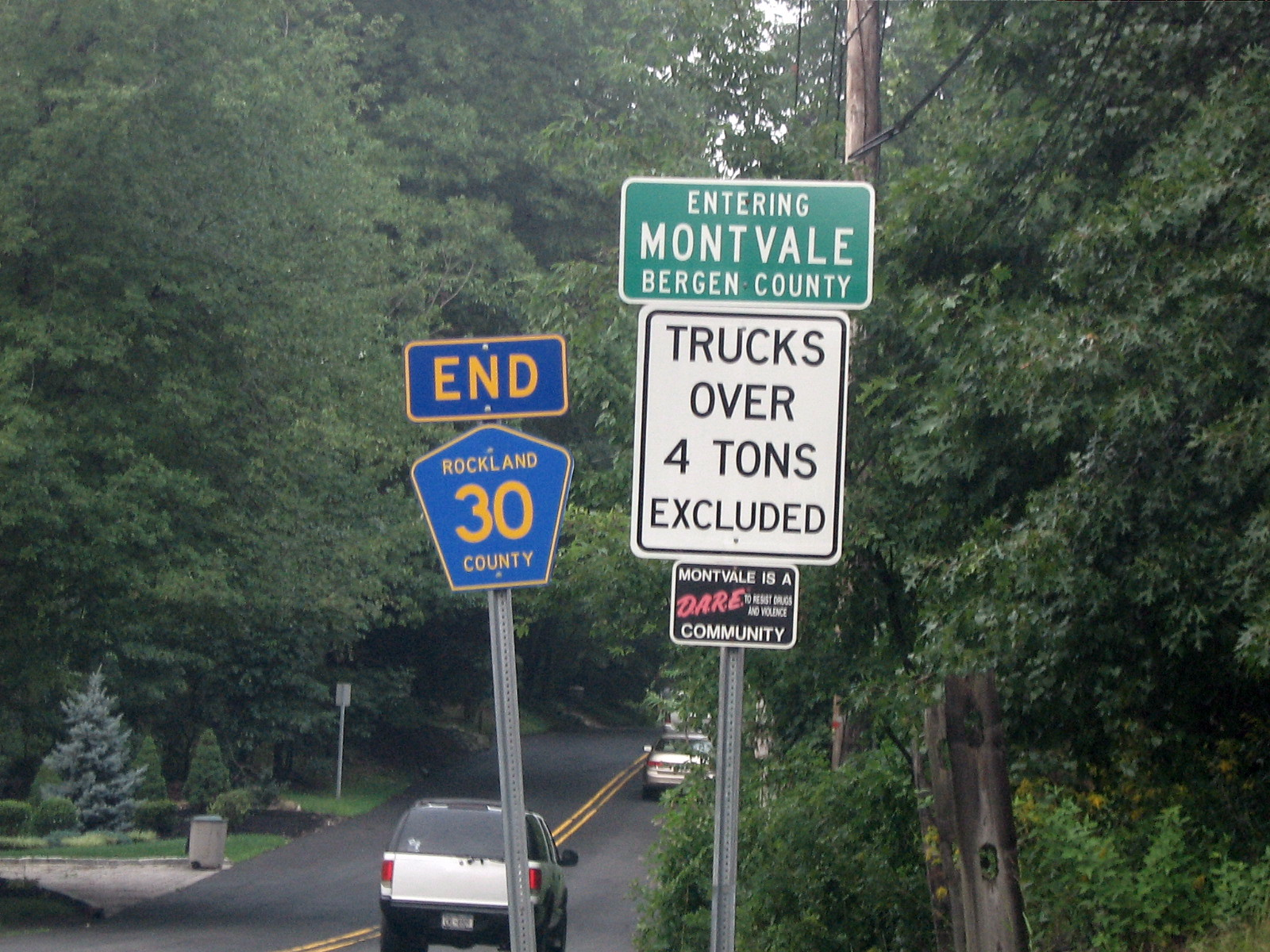
Terminus of County Route 30 in Pearl River, Rockland County, continuing into Montvale, New Jersey.

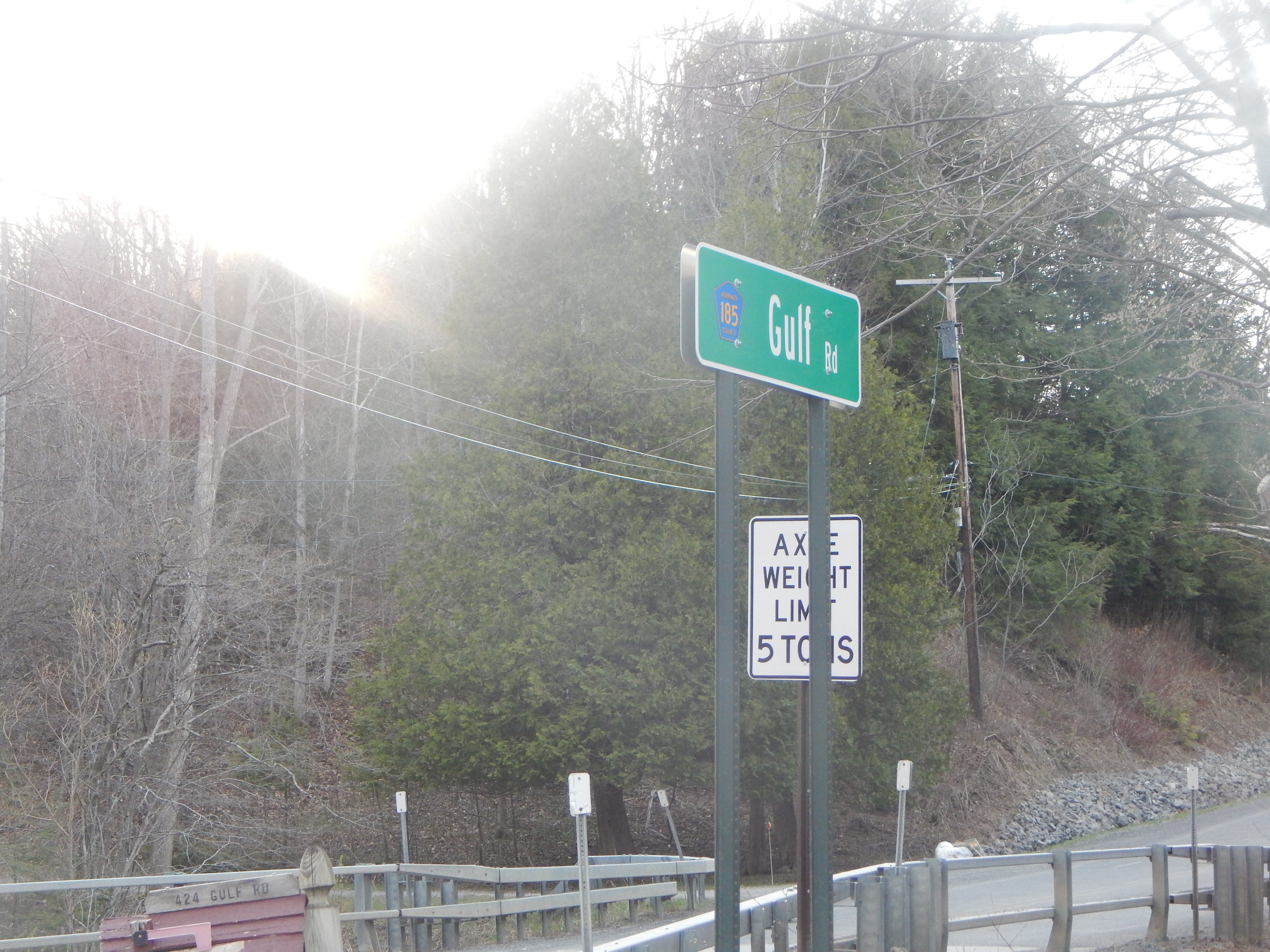
Example of a county route marker in Herkimer County.

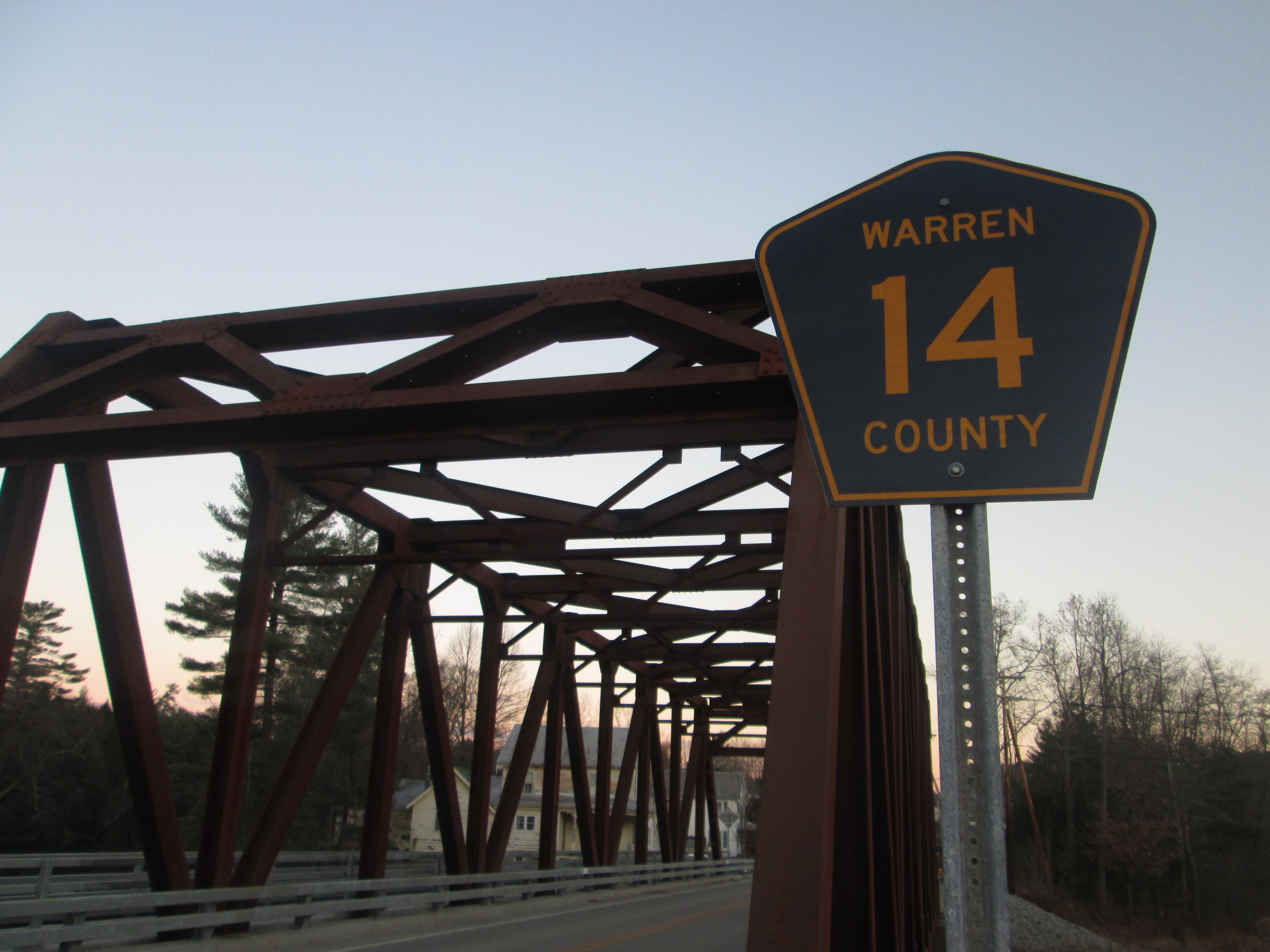
Example of a darker county route marker used by Warren County.

== List of county routes by county ==
- Albany County
- Allegany County
- Broome County
- Cattaraugus County
- Cayuga County
- Chautauqua County
- Chemung County
- Chenango County
- Clinton County
- Columbia County
- Cortland County
- Delaware County
- Dutchess County
- Erie County
- Essex County
- Franklin County
- Fulton County
- Genesee County
- Greene County
- Hamilton County
- Herkimer County
- Jefferson County
- Lewis County
- Livingston County
- Madison County
- Monroe County
- Montgomery County
- Nassau County
- Niagara County
- Oneida County
- Onondaga County
- Ontario County
- Orange County
- Orleans County
- Oswego County
- Otsego County
- Putnam County
- Rensselaer County
- Rockland County
- St. Lawrence County
- Saratoga County
- Schenectady County
- Schoharie County
- Schuyler County
- Seneca County
- Steuben County
- Suffolk County
- Sullivan County
- Tioga County
- Tompkins County
- Ulster County
- Warren County
- Washington County
- Wayne County
- Westchester County
- Wyoming County
- Yates County
