= New York State Route 36 =

State highway in western New York, US

New York State Route 36
- Map of New York with NY 36 highlighted in red

Route information
- Maintained by NYSDOT
- Length: 95.17 mi (153.16 km)
- Existed: mid-1920s–present

Major junctions
- South end: PA 249 at the Pennsylvania state line near Troupsburg
- NY 417 in Jasper; I-86 / NY 17 in Hornell; I-390 in Dansville; US 20A / NY 39 in Leicester; US 20 in York; I-490 in Churchville
- North end: NY 31 / NY 531 in Ogden

Location
- Country: United States
- State: New York
- Counties: Steuben, Livingston, Monroe

Highway system
- New York Highways; Interstate; US; State; Reference; Parkways
← NY 35	→ NY 36A

New York State Route 36 (NY 36) is a north–south state highway in the western part of New York in the United States. The highway extends for 95 miles (153 km) from the Pennsylvania state line at Troupsburg, Steuben County northward to Ogden, Monroe County, where it ends at an intersection with NY 31. Along the way, NY 36 passes through the villages of Canisteo, Dansville, Mount Morris, Caledonia, and Churchville and the city of Hornell. The section of the route between Dansville and Mount Morris closely parallels Interstate 390 (I-390); however, from Dansville south and Mount Morris north, NY 36 serves as a regionally important highway, connecting to I-86, U.S. Route 20A (US 20A), US 20, and I-490 as it heads north. At its south end, NY 36 connects to Pennsylvania Route 249 (PA 249).

The origins of NY 36 date back to 1908 when most of modern NY 36 between Jasper and Mumford was assigned a legislative route designation by the New York State Legislature. NY 36 was assigned in the mid-1920s to an alignment extending from Hornell north to Avon, utilizing its modern alignment south of Mount Morris and what is now NY 63 and NY 39 from Mount Morris to Avon. It was truncated in 1927 to end in Geneseo, but was subsequently realigned and extended as part of the 1930 renumbering of state highways in New York to continue north from Mount Morris to Ogden. NY 36 was extended again, this time southwestward to Andover, in the early 1940s, but was realigned just a decade later to continue southeast from Hornell to the Pennsylvania state line.

== Route description ==
=== Steuben County ===
NY 36 begins at the Pennsylvania state line in Troupsburg, where it continues south into Pennsylvania as PA 249. Heading north from the state line in Steuben County, the route follows Troups Creek northward through rural Troupsburg on its way to the equally isolated town of Jasper, where it meets NY 417 at a junction 1.25 miles (2.01 km) west of the small hamlet of Jasper. NY 36 joins NY 417 here, following the east–west route to the western fringe of the community. At a T-intersection just outside the hamlet, the two routes split, with NY 417 turning to the right (eastward) toward Corning and NY 36 making a left-hand turn to continue northward toward the town of Canisteo. Across the town line, NY 36 turns toward the northwest and serves the hamlet of South Canisteo, which marks the southern end of both Colonel Hills Creek and a valley formed by the waterway.

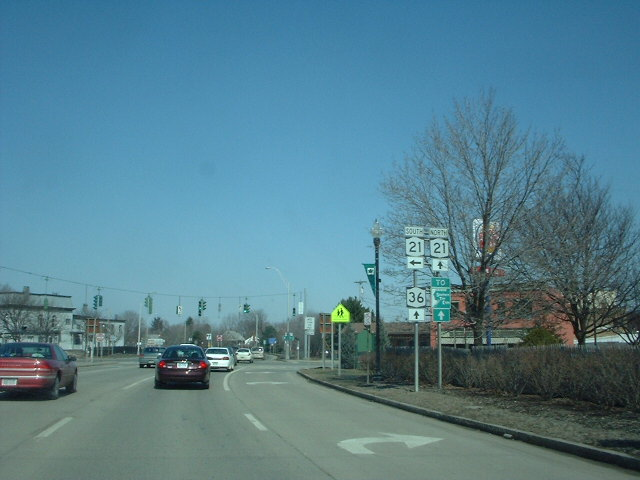
NY 36 north at NY 21 in Hornell

The route continues generally northerly through the creek valley to the outskirts of the village of Canisteo, where the creek valley gives way to a larger one surrounding the nearby Canisteo River. At this point, NY 36 curves sharply to the northwest, passing over Colonel Hills and Bennetts Creeks prior to entering the village as Main Street. In the center of Canisteo, it intersects the northern terminus of NY 248. Past NY 248, the route leaves the village and continues northwest along the lightly populated banks of the Canisteo River to the city of Hornell, which NY 36 traverses by way of a divided highway built c. 1979 to bypass Hornell along its western edge. (Prior to construction of this arterial and the new Canisteo-Hornell route, NY 36 followed Dineen and McBurney Roads north of Canisteo, along an abandoned and unenlargeable stretch along the Canisteo River, entering Hornell via Canisteo Street.) NY 36 heads north through the residential southern half of the city to Hornell's commercial central district, the site of a junction with Main Street and NY 21.

For the next 2.5 miles (4.0 km), NY 21 overlaps with NY 36, following it through Hornell's residential northern half, across the Canisteo River, and past pockets of development in the surrounding town of Hornellsville to a junction roughly 0.5 miles (0.8 km) south of NY 36's interchange with Interstate 86 (I-86) and NY 17. (Prior to the construction of the arterial, these routes ran along Seneca Street in Hornell and Seneca Road in North Hornell.) NY 21 breaks from NY 36 and proceeds to the northeast along an unnamed road; NY 36, however, continues along the bypass to I-86 and NY 17, where the two roads meet at I-86 and NY 17 exit 34 via a full cloverleaf interchange. Past the interchange, the divided highway narrows into a two-lane, undivided highway that continues through lightly populated areas of the town to the village of Arkport.

In Arkport, NY 36 intersects the eastern terminus of NY 961F, a reference route erroneously signed as a touring route, at West Avenue. Formerly, this intersection hosted the southern terminus of NY 70, which originally followed what is now NY 961F northwest to Canaseraga. North of Arkport, the Canisteo River makes a turn to the west while NY 36 continues to the northeast, running along the eastern edge of both a marshy area and an extension of the Canisteo River valley. In the town of Dansville, NY 36 intersects the current eastern terminus of NY 70 at an intersection located 5 miles (8 km) north of Arkport and due east of Canaseraga. From here northward, the highway takes on a more northeasterly routing as it crosses the northwest corner of the county, where it runs along the west side of Stony Brook State Park and briefly enters the park before emerging from the area just south of the Livingston County line.

=== Livingston County ===
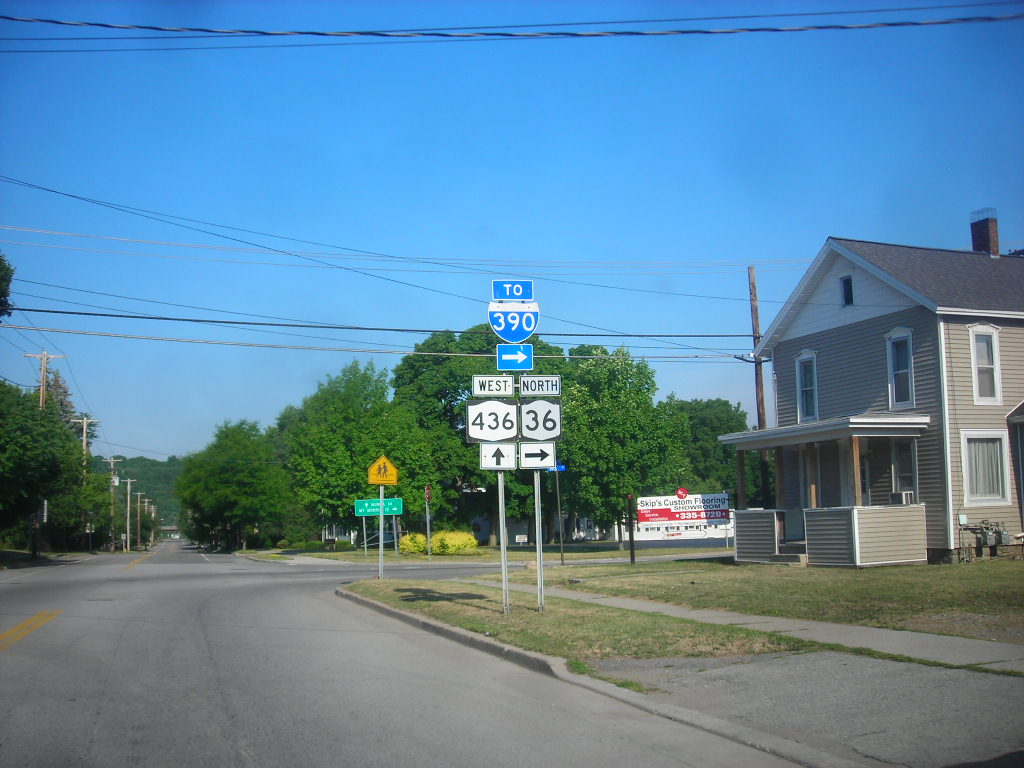
The eastern terminus of NY 436 at NY 36 in Dansville

Across the county line, NY 36 enters the town of North Dansville and the village of Dansville located within. At the southern village line, NY 36 meets the southbound entrance and exit ramps for I-390 at exit 4 and gains the name Clara Barton Street. Due to the angle at which I-390 crosses NY 36 here, the northbound entrance and exit ramps are located another 0.5 miles (0.8 km) to the north. The route follows Clara Barton Street north into the village center, where it gradually curves northeastward ahead of a junction with Main Street (NY 63) in Dansville's business district. NY 36 turns northwest here, following NY 63 along Main Street for two blocks before returning west on Ossian Street. The highway turns again just six blocks later to follow Dock and Franklin streets northwest toward Dansville Municipal Airport. Ossian Street, meanwhile, continues west as NY 436, which passes under I-390 a short distance to the west.

Between NY 436 and I-390 exit 6 near Groveland, NY 36 closely parallels I-390, remaining within 0.5 miles (0.8 km) or less of it for the entire distance. Just outside Dansville in the shadow of Dansville Municipal Airport, NY 36 connects to I-390 a second time by way of McWhorter Road and exit 5. Outside of Dansville, the highway heads northwestward across gradually less developed areas as it traverses the west side of a wide, flat valley known locally as the flats. After 8 miles (13 km), it intersects the western terminus of NY 258 (named Flats Road) at an intersection situated 2 miles (3.2 km) west of the hamlet of Groveland on the West Sparta–Groveland town line. Not far to the northwest is I-390 exit 6, the third and final meeting between I-390 and NY 36.

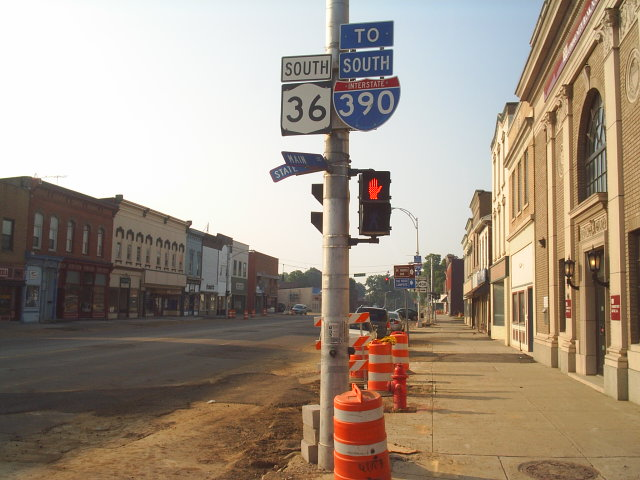
NY 408 joins NY 36 for one block in Mount Morris, beginning in the foreground at State Street and ending in the background at Chapel Street.

NY 36 continues on, passing through the hamlet of Sonyea and serving the Groveland Correctional Facility on its way into the town of Mount Morris and the village of the same name, where it becomes Main Street in the latter. It continues through the mostly residential community to the business district in the heart of the village, which NY 408 enters from the southwest on Chapel Street and leaves to the northeast on State Street. In between Chapel and State streets, NY 36 and NY 408 overlap for one block along Main Street. Immediately north of Mount Morris, NY 36 passes through the northern tip of Letchworth State Park and crosses the Genesee River, which separates the towns of Mount Morris and Leicester. As the route heads north into Leicester, it begins to leave the flats in favor of a more northwesterly alignment that leads it into the village of Leicester.

Now named Mount Morris Road, NY 36 enters the east side of the small village, intersecting with U.S. Route 20A (US 20A) and NY 39 at Main Street. NY 36 turns west onto Main Street, joining US 20A and NY 39 for one block in order to reach York Road, which carries the route out of the village and across sparsely populated areas to the York hamlet of Greigsville, centered on the highway's second junction with NY 63. After another 6 miles (10 km) of open, rural surroundings—save for the hamlet of York at the midpoint of the segment—NY 36 has a junction with US 20 in the hamlet of Fraser. The route continues on, eventually reaching the sprawling village of Caledonia, where the route joins with NY 5 for three blocks along Main Street. At the village's center, NY 36 turns north onto North Street, which carries the highway through the northern fringe of the village and into Monroe County.

=== Monroe County ===
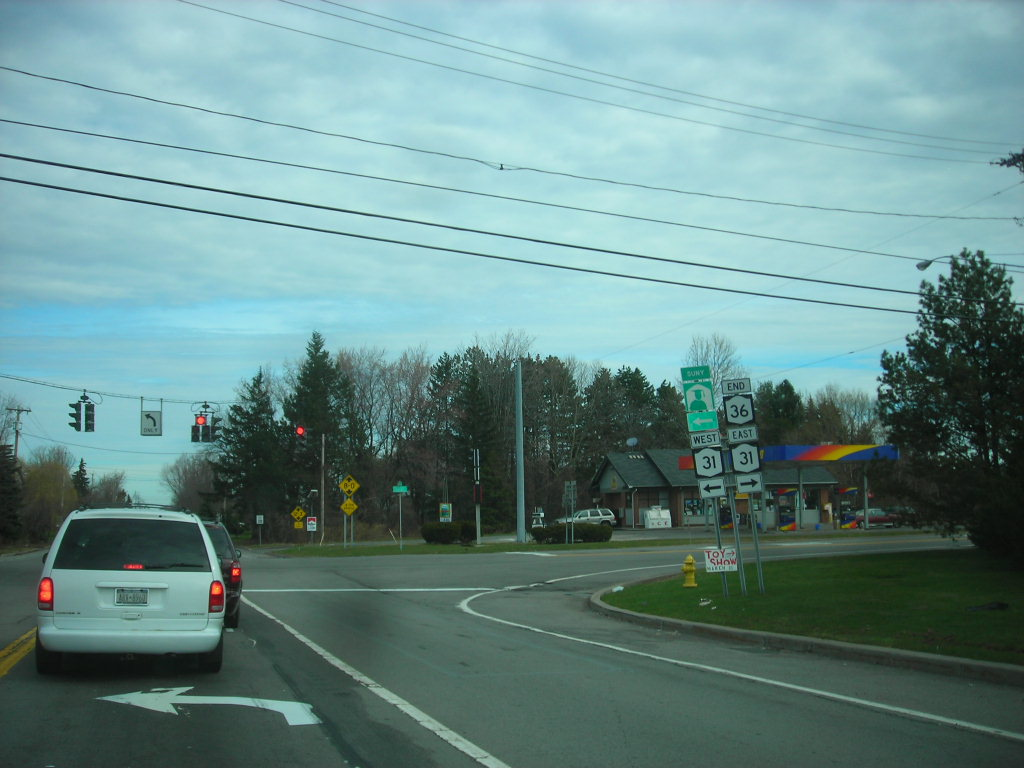
Northern terminus of NY 36 at NY 31 in Ogden

Across the county line from Caledonia is the Wheatland hamlet of Mumford, where NY 36 crosses over the Rochester and Southern Railroad—which the highway has loosely paralleled since Dansville—and Oatka Creek prior to meeting the southern terminus of NY 383. While the railroad, the creek, and NY 383 all head east to Scottsville, NY 36 continues to the north on Riga–Mumford Road, passing through isolated areas of the towns of Wheatland and Riga. Along this stretch, it passes over the New York State Thruway (I-90) a short distance south of the Wheatland–Riga town line. The route continues into the hamlet of Riga, where it intersects and briefly overlaps with NY 33A westward along Chili–Riga Center Road. At Churchville–Riga Road, NY 36 leaves NY 33A to resume its northward trek toward the village of Churchville.

About 1 mile (1.6 km) south of the village center, NY 36 meets I-490 at exit 3. North of this point, NY 36 becomes South Main Street as it enters the southern portion of Churchville. The highway proceeds into the village's central business district, centered on the junction of Main and Buffalo streets, the latter designated as NY 33. NY 36 turns east at Buffalo Street, joining with NY 33 for nine blocks on Buffalo Street as both routes cross over Black Creek and approach the eastern fringe of Churchville. Here, NY 36 turns north once more to follow Washington Street into the town of Ogden. The route continues through the mostly rural town toward the hamlet of Adams Basin, located west of Spencerport and east of Brockport. About 0.5 miles (0.8 km) south of Adams Basin, it intersects the western terminus of NY 531 (Spencerport Expressway) and meets NY 31 at junctions 100 yards (91 m) apart. NY 36 ends at the latter intersection; however, Washington Street continues north as County Route 212 to serve Adams Basin and the nearby Erie Canal.

== History ==
Like many New York State highways, NY 36 was not designed at one time as a single route; it consists of pieces of various projects later cobbled together and relabeled or renumbered.

In 1908, the New York State Legislature created Route 15, an unsigned legislative route that initially extended from Hornell in the south to Caledonia in the north via Dansville and Mount Morris. Also assigned at this time was Route 16, which went from Cuba to Rochester via Le Roy and Caledonia. Much of Route 15 followed modern NY 36; however, from Dansville to Mount Morris, it used what is now NY 63 and NY 408 instead. Route 16, meanwhile, followed current NY 36 from Caledonia to Mumford. From Jasper to Hornell, modern NY 36 was part of the cross-state Route 4. In 1911, special legislation routed a new Buffalo–Elmira–Binghamton–New York City route, to be built by the state, along what is now NY 36 between Hornell and Canisteo, and from there to Addison. On March 1, 1921, Route 16 was truncated to end in Le Roy. Its former routing north of Caledonia became part of Route 15.

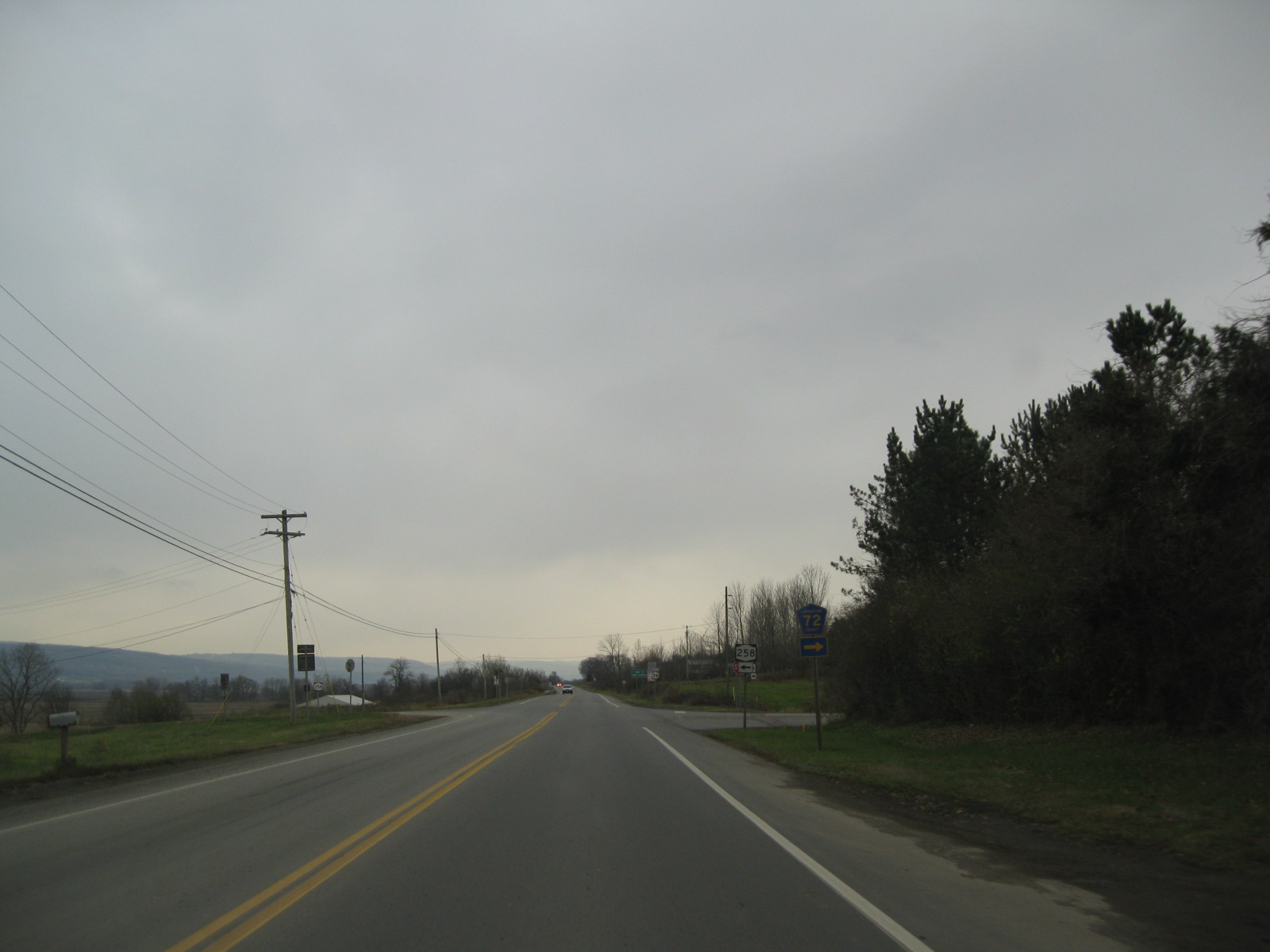
Southbound on NY 36 at NY 258 in the flats of Livingston County

NY 36 was assigned in the mid-1920s to an alignment extending from Hornell in the south to Avon in the north. The route utilized the routing of legislative Route 15 from Hornell to Dansville and from Mount Morris to Shakers Crossing, the modern junction of NY 63 and NY 408 northeast of Mount Morris. Between Dansville and Mount Morris, NY 36 followed its current alignment. Past Shakers Crossing, NY 36 continued northward through Geneseo to Avon on modern NY 63 and NY 39. The Geneseo–Avon segment of NY 36 became part of US 20 when that route was assigned in 1927. South of Hornell, what is now NY 36 from Hornell to Jasper became part of NY 17 when that route was assigned to most of legislative Route 4 in 1924. The remaining sections of contemporary NY 36—from Jasper to the Pennsylvania state line and north of Mount Morris—were state-maintained but unnumbered.

In the 1930 renumbering of state highways in New York, the segment of modern NY 36 from Hornell south to the Pennsylvania state line became the southernmost portion of NY 21. At the same time, NY 36 was realigned north of Mount Morris to follow the path of former legislative Route 15 north through Caledonia to Mumford. Past Mumford, NY 36 continued north on its modern alignment to a new terminus at NY 3 (now NY 31) south of Adams Basin. In the early 1940s, NY 36 was extended south through Hornell and Almond to Andover, replacing part of NY 17F. The routings of NY 36 and NY 21 south of Hornell were swapped in the early 1950s, placing both routes on their current alignments south of the city.

On June 8, 2017, Governor of New York Andrew Cuomo announced that they would upgrade the intersection of NY 531 and NY 36. This would improve the connection between NY 531 and NY 31 for safety purposes. Instead of the abrupt end at NY 36, a new road would be constructed to connect NY 531 and NY 31. NY 31 would be widened from Gallup Road to NY 531; a center median would be added and a portion of NY 31 between NY 531 and NY 36 would become a cul-de-sac for the residences in the area. NYSDOT projects that the job would be completed by the end of 2018.

== NY 36A ==
New York State Route 36A
- Location: Dansville–Mount Morris
- Existed: 1930–December 1940

NY 36A was an alternate route of NY 36 between Dansville and Mount Morris. The route began at NY 36 in Dansville and passed through Groveland on its way to the vicinity of Mount Morris, where it ended at a junction with NY 63 northeast of the village. NY 36A was assigned as part of the 1930 renumbering of state highways in New York and supplanted by a realigned NY 63 in December 1940.

== Major intersections ==
County	Location	mi	km	Destinations	Notes
Steuben	Troupsburg	0.00	0.00	PA 249 south	Continuation into Pennsylvania
Steuben	Jasper	9.40	15.13	NY 417 west – Greenwood	Western terminus of NY 36 / NY 417 overlap
Steuben	Jasper	10.62	17.09	NY 417 east – Jasper, Addison	Eastern terminus of NY 36 / NY 417 overlap; hamlet of Jasper
Steuben	Village of Canisteo	22.61	36.39	NY 248 south	Northern terminus of NY 248
Steuben	Hornell	27.93	44.95	NY 21 south – Almond	Southern terminus of NY 21 / NY 36 overlap
Steuben	Hornellsville	30.45	49.00	NY 21 north – Wayland	Northern terminus of NY 21 / NY 36 overlap
Steuben	Hornellsville	31.04	49.95	I-86 / NY 17 – Binghamton, Jamestown	Exit 34 (I-86)
Steuben	Arkport	33.07	53.22	NY 961F west	Former NY 70
Steuben	Dansville	38.19	61.46	NY 70 north – Canaseraga	Southern terminus of NY 70; former NY 70A
Livingston	Dansville	44.23	71.18	I-390 – Corning, Rochester	Exit 4 (I-390)
Livingston	Dansville	45.27	72.86	NY 63 south	Southern terminus of NY 36 / NY 63 overlap
Livingston	Dansville	45.40	73.06	NY 63 north to NY 256	Northern terminus of NY 36 / NY 63 overlap
Livingston	Dansville	45.86	73.80	NY 436 west – Nunda	Eastern terminus of NY 436
Livingston	North Dansville	46.69	75.14	I-390	Exit 5 (I-390); hamlet of Cumminsville
Livingston	West Sparta–Groveland town line	54.69	88.02	NY 258 east	Western terminus of NY 258
Livingston	Groveland	55.48	89.29	I-390 – Rochester, Corning	Exit 6 (I-390)
Livingston	Village of Mount Morris	60.62	97.56	NY 408 to I-390	NY 408 overlaps with NY 36 for one block
Livingston	Village of Leicester	64.01	103.01	US 20A east / NY 39 east – Geneseo	Eastern terminus of US 20A / NY 36 / NY 39 overlap
Livingston	Village of Leicester	64.15	103.24	US 20A west / NY 39 west – Warsaw, Perry	Western terminus of US 20A / NY 36 / NY 39 overlap
Livingston	Town of York	68.19	109.74	NY 63	Hamlet of Greigsville
Livingston	Town of York	74.07	119.20	US 20	Hamlet of Fraser
Livingston	Village of Caledonia	78.49	126.32	NY 5 west	Western terminus of NY 5 / NY 36 overlap
Livingston	Village of Caledonia	78.87	126.93	NY 5 east – Avon	Eastern terminus of NY 5 / NY 36 overlap
Monroe	Wheatland	80.56	129.65	NY 383 north – Scottsville	Southern terminus of NY 383; hamlet of Mumford
Monroe	Riga	86.04	138.47	NY 33A east – Rochester	Eastern terminus of NY 33A / NY 36 overlap
Monroe	Riga	86.27	138.84	NY 33A west	Western terminus of NY 33A / NY 36 overlap
Monroe	Churchville	87.92	141.49	I-490 – Rochester	Exit 3 (I-490)
Monroe	Churchville	88.69	142.73	NY 33 west	Western terminus of NY 33 / NY 36 overlap
Monroe	Churchville	89.52	144.07	NY 33 east	Eastern terminus of NY 33 / NY 36 overlap
Monroe	Ogden	95.11	153.06	NY 531 east	Western terminus of NY 531
Monroe	Ogden	95.17	153.16	NY 31	Northern terminus
1.000 mi = 1.609 km; 1.000 km = 0.621 mi: Concurrency terminus
