= Canaseraga Four Corners Historic District =

Historic district in New York, United States

- U.S. National Register of Historic Places
- U.S. Historic district
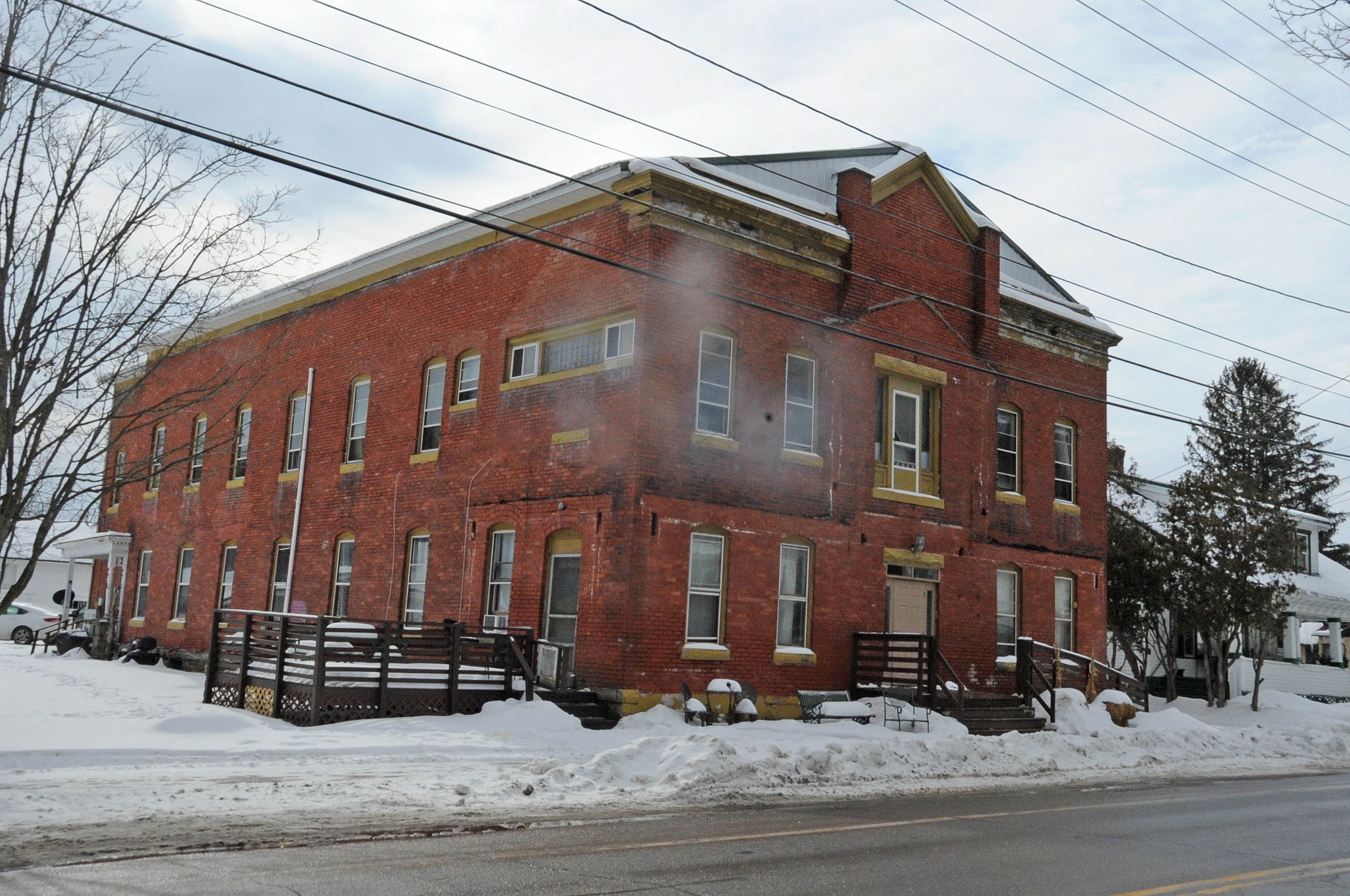

- Location within New York Location within the United States
- Location: 42-64 and 43-69 Main St., 9 S. Church St., Canaseraga, New York
- Coordinates: 42°27′41″N 77°46′39″W
- Area: 1.7 acres (0.69 ha)
- Built: 1895
- Architectural style: Late Victorian
- NRHP reference No.: 02000145
- Added to NRHP: March 06, 2002

Canaseraga Four Corners Historic District is a national historic district located at Canaseraga in Allegany County, New York. The district consists of 1.7 acres (0.69 ha) and includes 16 contributing buildings. It encompasses that part of the remaining commercial core that retains a high degree of architectural integrity. It is an intact example of a cohesive collection of a building type and style that characterized rural villages at the end of the 19th century.

It was listed on the National Register of Historic Places in 2002.
