= New York State Route 408 =

State highway in Livingston County, New York, US

New York State Route 408
- Map of Livingston County in western New York with NY 408 highlighted in red

Route information
- Maintained by NYSDOT
- Length: 15.95 mi (25.67 km)
- Existed: early 1940s–present

Major junctions
- South end: NY 70 in Nunda
- I-390 in Groveland
- North end: NY 63 in Groveland

Location
- Country: United States
- State: New York
- Counties: Livingston

Highway system
- New York Highways; Interstate; US; State; Reference; Parkways
← NY 407	→ NY 409
← NY 63	NY 63A	→ NY 64

New York State Route 408 (NY 408) is a 15.95-mile-long (25.67 km) state highway located entirely within Livingston County, New York, in the United States. It runs north–south from an intersection with NY 70 near the hamlet of Dalton in the town of Nunda to a junction with NY 63 in the town of Groveland near NY 408's exit with Interstate 390 (I-390). Most of NY 408 is a two-lane rural highway that passes through lightly developed areas; however, the last two miles (3 km) of the highway, where it runs in a due east–west direction, are heavily trafficked as NY 408 becomes a key connector road in both directions.

The origins of NY 408 date back to the early 20th century when the portion of the route north of the village of Nunda became part of two unsigned legislative routes. One of the two, Route 15, utilized the segment of modern NY 408 northeast of Mount Morris, and this segment became part of the signed NY 36 in the mid-1920s. Most of the route remained unnumbered until the 1930 renumbering of state highways in New York, however, at which time NY 36 was moved off the highway and all of what is now NY 408 became part of NY 63. That route was realigned as well in the early 1940s to head southeast from Mount Morris to Dansville, giving way to NY 408.

NY 408, like its predecessor, initially extended southwest from Dalton to Hinsdale in Cattaraugus County via Angelica. During the first few years of its existence, NY 408 had an easterly alternate route between Angelica and Dalton. The route, designated New York State Route 408A (previously New York State Route 63A), became part of NY 408 itself in 1949. NY 408 was cut back to its current southern terminus on July 1, 1974 following the construction of the Southern Tier Expressway between Hinsdale and Angelica.

== Route description ==
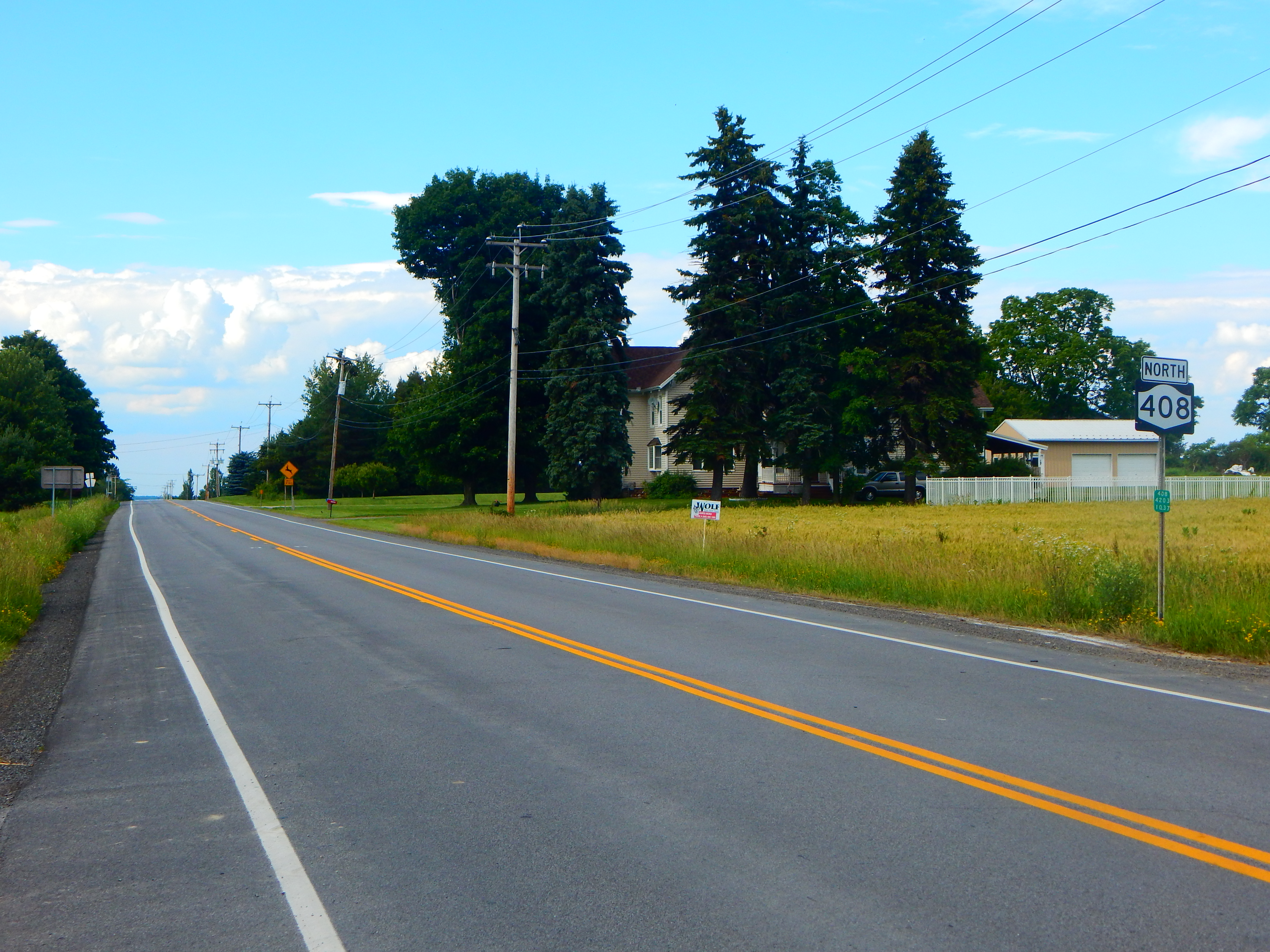
NY 408 north of NY 70 in Dalton

NY 408, also known in the area as Nunda–Dalton Road, begins at a quiet intersection with NY 70 at the hamlet of Dalton in the southern portion of the town of Nunda. It follows a mostly straight and rural road, save for one easterly deviation to bypass a hill, for 2 miles (3.2 km) to the village of Nunda, where it takes the name State Street. In the center of the village, NY 408 intersects NY 436, another route of regional importance. From Nunda, it continues as Mount Morris–Nunda Road in the same direction for the next 10 miles (16 km) through open farmland and meadows in the towns of Nunda and Mount Morris. Midway along this stretch, County Route 3 (CR 3), formerly the westernmost portion of NY 258, leaves to the east.

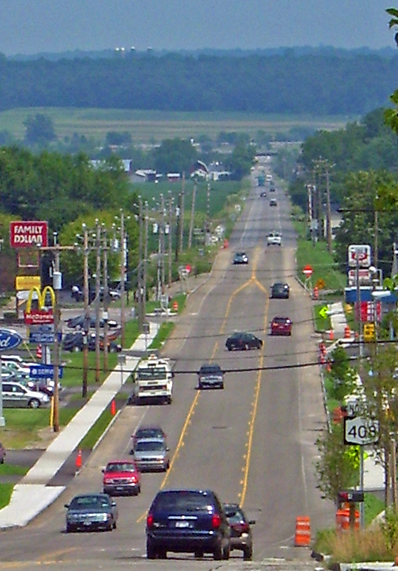
NY 408 between Mount Morris and I-390

North of Nunda, NY 408 roughly parallels the eastern edge of Letchworth State Park, gradually getting closer to the park as it proceeds onward. Eventually, the route connects to the park at its northeast entrance, but subsequently curves to the northeast to enter the village of Mount Morris on Chapel Street. In the village's business district, NY 408 joins the village's main street, NY 36, for one wide block north to State Street. Here, NY 408 breaks from NY 36 and leaves Mount Morris in a more easterly direction. A slight descent starts a straight route across the low-lying wetlands next to the Genesee River, and I-390 is visible in the distance. There is almost no development on this portion due to the wetlands; however, there is a grade crossing with the Genesee and Wyoming Railroad subdivision of the Rochester and Southern Railroad.

Immediately after crossing Canaseraga Creek, a tributary of the Genesee River, NY 408 meets I-390 at the freeway's exit 7. Just northeast of the interchange is a junction with NY 63, where NY 408 comes to an end. NY 63, meanwhile, turns north here to follow the right-of-way of NY 408 northward on Mount Morris–Geneseo Road toward the village of Geneseo. Although I-390 passes close to Geneseo, there is no exit for the village itself; instead, the connection is made via exit 7 (NY 408 and NY 63) heading northbound and exit 8 (U.S. Route 20A) heading southbound. As a result, the segment of NY 408 between I-390 and NY 63 has the second-highest traffic volume of any section of the route—an estimated 9,400 vehicles per day as of 2009. In fact, the piece of NY 408 from Mount Morris east sees far higher traffic volumes than the remainder of the highway, with the part that overlaps NY 36 carrying an average of 11,680 cars per day in 2009.

== History ==
Most of what is now NY 408 was originally part of one of several unsigned legislative routes assigned by the New York State Legislature in the early 20th century. In 1908, the portion northeast of Mount Morris became part of Route 15, which initially extended from Hornell to Caledonia via Dansville and Mount Morris. Route 15 mostly followed modern NY 36; however, from Dansville to Mount Morris, it used what is now NY 63 and NY 408 instead. In 1911, the Nunda–Mount Morris segment of modern NY 408 was included in Route 43, a highway leading southwestward from Mount Morris to Portageville via Nunda. West of Nunda, Route 43 utilized today's NY 436. The remainder of modern NY 408 did not become part of a legislative route; however, it was taken over by the state of New York by 1926 nonetheless.

New York State Route 408A
- Location: Angelica–Dalton
- Existed: early 1940s–1949

Although the entirety of modern NY 408 was state-maintained by 1926, only one section of the route—the portion designated as part of legislative Route 15—was assigned a posted route number by that time. In the mid-1920s, this piece was designated as part of NY 36, which initially continued north to Geneseo on modern NY 63. It remained part of NY 36 until the 1930 renumbering of state highways in New York when NY 36 was altered to exit Mount Morris to the north instead. Its former routing from Mount Morris to Geneseo became part of the new NY 63, which originally continued southwest from Mount Morris for 52 miles (84 km) to a junction with NY 16 in Hinsdale, a hamlet in eastern Cattaraugus County.

NY 63 left Mount Morris on the former routing of legislative Route 43 and followed it south to the village of Nunda, from where it continued to the hamlet of Dalton over the previously unnumbered Dalton–Nunda state highway. Past Dalton, NY 63 proceeded southwest to Hinsdale by way of Old State Road, what is now Allegany County's CR 15, CR 16, and CR 20 (with a brief concurrency with NY 19 separating CR 16 and CR 20), and modern NY 446. Also assigned as part of the renumbering was NY 63A, an easterly alternate route of NY 63 from Angelica to Dalton along current CR 16, CR 15B, and NY 70. Prior to 1930, the Hinsdale–Amity (Belvidere) segment of NY 63 was part of NY 17 while the portion of NY 63A south of what is now NY 70 was the westernmost portion of NY 38.

NY 63 continued to pass through Mount Morris until the early 1940s, at which time it was rerouted south of Mount Morris to follow its current alignment through Dansville to Wayland. NY 63's former routing to Hinsdale was redesignated as NY 408 while NY 63A was renumbered accordingly to NY 408A. The NY 408A designation was short-lived, however, as NY 408 was realigned on January 1, 1949, to follow NY 408A from Angelica to Dalton. In the early 1970s, the Southern Tier Expressway was constructed alongside NY 408 from Hinsdale to Angelica, leading to the truncation of NY 408 to its current southern terminus in Dalton on July 1, 1974. The portion of NY 408's former routing between NY 70 and Church Street in Dalton remained state-maintained until April 1, 1983, when ownership and maintenance of the road was transferred to Livingston County as part of a highway maintenance swap between the two levels of government. It was subsequently designated as CR 24A.

== Major intersections ==
The entire route is in Livingston County.

Location	mi	km	Destinations	Notes
Town of Nunda	0.00	0.00	NY 70	Southern terminus, hamlet of Dalton
Village of Nunda	2.57	4.14	NY 436	
Town of Mount Morris	6.72	10.81	CR 3	Former western terminus of NY 258
Village of Mount Morris	13.69	22.03	NY 36 south	Southern terminus of NY 36 / NY 408 overlap
Village of Mount Morris	13.74	22.11	NY 36 north – Letchworth State Park	Northern terminus of NY 36 / NY 408 overlap
Town of Groveland	15.70	25.27	I-390 – Corning, Rochester	Exit 7 (I-390)
Town of Groveland	15.95	25.67	NY 63 – Geneseo, Groveland Station	Northern terminus
1.000 mi = 1.609 km; 1.000 km = 0.621 mi: Concurrency terminus

== See also ==
- List of county routes in Allegany County, New York
- List of county routes in Livingston County, New York
