= Dalton, New York =

- Census-designated place
- Location within New York Location within the United States
- Coordinates: 42°32′20″N 77°57′1″W
- Country: United States
- State: New York
- County: Livingston
- Towns: Nunda, Portage

Area
  - Total: 0.76 sq mi (1.96 km^{2})
  - Land: 0.76 sq mi (1.96 km^{2})
  - Water: 0 sq mi (0.00 km^{2})
- Elevation: 1,360 ft (410 m)

Population (2020)
  - Total: 351
  - Density: 465.0/sq mi (179.54/km^{2})
- Time zone: UTC-5 (Eastern (EST))
  - Summer (DST): UTC-4 (EDT)
- ZIP code: 14836
- Area code: 585
- FIPS code: 36-19587
- GNIS feature ID: 948001

Dalton is a hamlet and census-designated place (CDP) in the towns of Nunda and Portage in Livingston County, New York, United States. The population was 351 at the 2020 census.

== Geography ==
Dalton is in southwestern Livingston County, primarily in the southwestern part of the town of Nunda, with a small portion crossing into the southeastern part of the town of Portage. New York State Route 70 passes through the northern part of the community, leading northwest 6 miles (10 km) to Portageville and southeast 11 miles (18 km) to Canaseraga. State Route 408 leads north from SR 70 2.5 miles (4.0 km) to the village of Nunda.

According to the U.S. Census Bureau, the Dalton CDP has an area of 0.76 square miles (1.96 km^{2}), all land. The western edge of the CDP is Keshequa Creek, a northward-flowing tributary of Canaseraga Creek and part of the Genesee River watershed.

== Demographics ==
Historical population
Census	Pop.	Note	%±
2010	362		—
2020	351		−3.0%
U.S. Decennial Census
