= Coopersville, Livingston County, New York =

Hamlet in Nunda, New York, US

Coordinates: 42°36′13″N 77°54′41″W

Coopersville is a hamlet in the town of Nunda, Livingston County, New York, United States. Coopersville lies at an elevation of 843 feet (257 m).
