= Granger, New York =

- Town
- Location within New York Location within the United States
- Coordinates: 42°29′6″N 77°59′48″W
- Country: United States
- State: New York
- County: Allegany

Government
  - Type: Town Council
  - Town Supervisor: Tom Voss (R)
  - Town Council: Members' List: • Calvin Carmer (R); • Joshua James (R); • Justin Bennett (R); • Zebulin Beardsley (R)

Area
  - Total: 32.04 sq mi (82.98 km^{2})
  - Land: 31.94 sq mi (82.72 km^{2})
  - Water: 0.10 sq mi (0.26 km^{2})
- Elevation: 1,795 ft (547 m)

Population (2020)
  - Total: 522 ▼
  - Estimate (2021): 522
  - Density: 16.3/sq mi (6.29/km^{2})
- Time zone: UTC-5 (Eastern (EST))
  - Summer (DST): UTC-4 (EDT)
- ZIP Codes: 14735 (Fillmore); 14836 (Dalton); 14846 (Hunt)
- FIPS code: 36-003-29905
- GNIS feature ID: 0979013
- Website: grangerny.org

Granger is a town in Allegany County, New York, United States. The population was 522 at the 2020 census. The town was named after Francis Granger, United States Postmaster General.

The town lies on the county's northern border and is northwest of Hornell.

== History ==
Granger was part of the Morris Tract and called by the natives Sho-ne-ti-yea.

The area was first settled circa 1816. The town of Granger was established in 1838 from the town of Grove, after having been part of many towns incorporated earlier in Livingston County and Allegany County. At the time the town was established it was called "West Grove", but assumed its current name in the next year, 1839.

== Geography ==
According to the United States Census Bureau, the town has a total area of 32.0 square miles (83 km^{2}), of which 31.9 square miles (83 km^{2}) is land and 0.1 square miles (0.26 km^{2}) (0.16%) is water.

The Genesee River forms part of the western border of the town. Rush Creek, an important stream in the town, is a tributary of the Genesee River. The north town line is the border of Livingston County.

== Demographics ==
Historical population
| Census | Pop. | Note | %± |
|---|---|---|---|
| 1840 | 1,064 | | — |
| 1850 | 1,309 | | 23.0% |
| 1860 | 1,257 | | −4.0% |
| 1870 | 1,050 | | −16.5% |
| 1880 | 1,086 | | 3.4% |
| 1890 | 954 | | −12.2% |
| 1900 | 800 | | −16.1% |
| 1910 | 708 | | −11.5% |
| 1920 | 590 | | −16.7% |
| 1930 | 477 | | −19.2% |
| 1940 | 484 | | 1.5% |
| 1950 | 455 | | −6.0% |
| 1960 | 429 | | −5.7% |
| 1970 | 450 | | 4.9% |
| 1980 | 508 | | 12.9% |
| 1990 | 515 | | 1.4% |
| 2000 | 577 | | 12.0% |
| 2010 | 538 | | −6.8% |
| 2020 | 522 | | −3.0% |
| 2021 (est.) | 522 | | 0.0% |
U.S. Decennial Census

As of the census of 2000, there were 577 people, 215 households, and 159 families residing in the town. The population density was 18.0 inhabitants per square mile (6.9/km^{2}). There were 357 housing units at an average density of 11.2 per square mile (4.3/km^{2}). The racial makeup of the town was 96.19% White, 0.52% African American, 2.60% Native American, 0.17% from other races, and 0.52% from two or more races.

There were 215 households, out of which 30.7% had children under the age of 18 living with them, 62.8% were married couples living together, 6.0% had a female householder with no husband present, and 26.0% were non-families. 22.8% of all households were made up of individuals, and 9.3% had someone living alone who was 65 years of age or older. The average household size was 2.68 and the average family size was 3.04.

In the town, the population was spread out, with 27.0% under the age of 18, 6.8% from 18 to 24, 27.7% from 25 to 44, 25.8% from 45 to 64, and 12.7% who were 65 years of age or older. The median age was 37 years. For every 100 females, there were 112.9 males. For every 100 females age 18 and over, there were 117.0 males.

The median income for a household in the town was $25,875, and the median income for a family was $28,056. Males had a median income of $24,083 versus $18,250 for females. The per capita income for the town was $12,084. About 25.3% of families and 31.2% of the population were below the poverty line, including 51.1% of those under age 18 and 10.1% of those age 65 or over.

== Communities and location in Granger ==
- Granger – A hamlet in the north part of the town on County Road 15.
- Short Tract – A hamlet in the south part of the town on County Road 15.

== Notable people ==
- Adrianna Hungerford (1858–1946), temperance activist, leader; born in Short Tract
- Henry Moore Teller (1830–1914), United States Senator and Secretary of the Interior; born on a farm in Granger
- Thomas Jones Thorp (1837–1915), Union Army officer
