= Nunda, New York =

- Town
- Location within New York Location within the United States
- Coordinates: 42°34′50″N 77°56′18″W
- Country: United States
- State: New York
- County: Livingston

Government
  - Type: Town Council
  - Town Supervisor: Merilee Walker (R)
  - Deputy Supervisor: James Forrester (R

Area
  - Total: 37.12 sq mi (96.14 km^{2})
  - Land: 37.09 sq mi (96.07 km^{2})
  - Water: 0.027 sq mi (0.07 km^{2})
- Elevation: 930 ft (280 m)

Population (2010)
  - Total: 3,064
  - Estimate (2016): 2,966
  - Density: 80.0/sq mi (30.87/km^{2})
- Time zone: Eastern (EST)
- ZIP Codes: 14517 (Nunda); 14836 (Dalton)
- Area code: 585
- FIPS code: 36-051-54089
- GNIS feature ID: 979298
- Website: www.townofnundany.gov

Nunda (pronounced "none-day") is a town in Livingston County, New York, United States. The population was 3,064 at the 2010 census. Nunda welcomes visitors with signs stating "Welcome to Nunda, a Nice Place to Live." The name is derived from Nunda-wa-ono, the name given to it by a group of the Seneca people who once lived in the hills and valleys along the Genesee River and Keshequa Creek within the present-day town. In the Seneca language, "Nunda" relates to hills, and a popular translation is "Where the valley meets the hills".

Nunda is at the southwest border of the county and contains a village also called Nunda.

== History ==
In 1790, two small Seneca villages could be found opposite each other on the Chautauqua Hollow Trail which became State Street.

Nunda was first settled around 1806 what is now near the village of Nunda. The town was formed in 1808 from the town of Angelica (in Allegany County) before the creation of Livingston County. In 1827, part of Nunda was used to found the new town of Portage. Originally called "Nunda Valley", the name was shortened to "Nunda" by Charles H. Carroll in 1824. The village of Nunda was incorporated as "Nunda Valley" and later "Nunda" in 1939. On March 11, 2008, the town of Nunda celebrated its bicentennial.

In 1808, only three pioneer families lived in what is now Nunda. By 1830 the population had increased to 1,291, and by 1840 there were 2,636 residents. The population peaked at nearly 4,000 in the 1840s when the Genesee River Canal was built, which ran through the town until 1878. The population had fallen to less than 3,000 by the early 1880s.

=== People of note ===
- Chester B. Bowen, Union Army soldier and Medal of Honor winner; born in Nunda in 1842
- Helen Hunt Jackson, author; a brief resident
- Gustavus A. Palmer, born in Nunda in 1805 and colonel in the Patriot War, named his Illinois post-war residence Nunda Township after his birthplace.

== Geography ==
According to the United States Census Bureau, the town has a total area of 37.1 square miles (96.1 km^{2}), of which 0.03 square miles (0.07 km^{2}), or 0.07%, are water.

The south town line is the border of Allegany County.

New York State Route 436, east-west, intersects New York State Route 408, north-south, at Nunda village. New York State Route 70 crosses the south part of the town.

=== Adjacent towns and areas ===
Nunda is bordered by the town of Portage to the west, and the towns of West Sparta and Ossian are to the east. The town of Mount Morris is to the north, and the town of Grove in Allegany County is to the south.

Interstate 390 passes 3 miles (5 km) northeast of the town and provides transportation north to the city of Rochester and southeast to the Finger Lakes Region.

== Demographics ==
Historical population
Census	Pop.	Note	%±
1820	1,188		—
1830	1,291		8.7%
1840	2,637		104.3%
1850	3,128		18.6%
1860	2,849		−8.9%
1870	2,686		−5.7%
1880	2,790		3.9%
1890	2,426		−13.0%
1900	2,397		−1.2%
1910	2,361		−1.5%
1920	2,272		−3.8%
1930	2,100		−7.6%
1940	2,113		0.6%
1950	2,272		7.5%
1960	2,309		1.6%
1970	2,574		11.5%
1980	2,692		4.6%
1990	2,931		8.9%
2000	3,017		2.9%
2010	3,064		1.6%
2016 (est.)	2,966	▼	−3.2%
U.S. Decennial Census

As of the census of 2000, there were 3,017 people, 1,131 households, and 842 families residing in the town. The population density was 81.4 inhabitants per square mile (31.4/km^{2}). There were 1,298 housing units at an average density of 35.0 per square mile (13.5/km^{2}). The racial makeup of the town was 97.88% White, 0.53% Black or African American, 0.23% Native American, 0.17% Asian, 0.03% Pacific Islander, 0.33% from other races, and 0.83% from two or more races. Hispanic or Latino of any race were 0.89% of the population.

There were 1,131 households, out of which 38.8% had children under the age of 18 living with them, 57.6% were married couples living together, 13.0% had a female householder with no husband present, and 25.5% were non-families. 20.5% of all households were made up of individuals, and 8.4% had someone living alone who was 65 years of age or older. The average household size was 2.63 and the average family size was 3.02.

In the town, the population was spread out, with 27.9% under the age of 18, 7.3% from 18 to 24, 29.0% from 25 to 44, 22.8% from 45 to 64, and 13.0% who were 65 years of age or older. The median age was 36 years. For every 100 females, there were 98.0 males. For every 100 females age 18 and over, there were 92.7 males.

The median income for a household in the town was $40,665, and the median income for a family was $44,677. Males had a median income of $32,483 versus $22,660 for females. The per capita income for the town was $17,604. About 5.3% of families and 9.1% of the population were below the poverty line, including 11.0% of those under age 18 and 4.3% of those age 65 or over.

== Communities and locations in the Town of Nunda ==
- Barkertown – A hamlet southeast of Nunda village.
- Coopersville – A hamlet northeast of Nunda village.
- Dalton – A hamlet (and census-designated place) in the southwest corner of the town (part is also in the town of Portage) on Route 408.
- East Hill – A former community in the southeast part of the town.
- Nunda – The village of Nunda is near the western town line.
- Rattlesnake Hill Wildlife Management Area – A state conservation area in the southeast part of the town.

== Schools ==
The town is in the Keshequa Central School District which includes Dalton Elementary School and the Nunda Middle School/High School. The schools are currently under leadership by Superintendent Powers. The word Keshequa is of Seneca origin and means "Spear in the Creek"
