= Canaseraga Creek =

- Location of the mouth of Canaseraga Creek in New York State Canaseraga Creek (the United States)

Location
- Country: United States
- State: New York
- Counties: Livingston, Steuben, Allegany

Physical characteristics
- Source
  - location: Town of Nunda, Livingston County
  - coordinates: 42°33′44″N 77°52′51″W
- Mouth: Genesee River
  - location: Near Mount Morris, Livingston County
  - coordinates: 42°45′19″N 77°50′26″W
- Basin size: 334 sq mi (870 km^{2})
- Discharge
  - location: Shakers Crossing (1.4 miles [2.3 km] upstream from mouth)
  - average: 309 cu ft/s (8.7 m^{3}/s)
  - minimum: 4.3 cu ft/s (0.12 m^{3}/s) (August 19, 1970)
  - maximum: 5,510 cu ft/s (156 m^{3}/s) (January 19, 1996)

Basin features
- Tributaries
  - left: Keshequa Creek

Canaseraga Creek is a stream that flows through Livingston, Steuben, and Allegany Counties in western and central New York. It is a tributary of the Genesee River, and its 334-square-mile (870 km^{2}) watershed is the largest sub-watershed of that river.

The creek's name is of Seneca origin, and was recorded in early records as Ganusgago, Kanuskago, and Caniskrauga. Translations of the name include both "among the milkweeds" and "slippery elms".

== Course ==
Canaseraga Creek rises in the town of Nunda, and initially flows south. The creek turns eastward before passing through the village of Canaseraga, after which it flows north. It passes to the west of the village of Dansville, and continues north before joining the Genesee River east of the village of Mount Morris and just downstream of the Mount Morris Dam.

The creek's watershed is the largest sub-watershed of Genesee River. It is primarily composed of agricultural land (46.8%) and forests (44.4%), with 5.7% of the watershed developed for residential and industrial uses.

== Recreation ==
The main stem of Canaseraga Creek is annually stocked with brown trout by the New York State Department of Environmental Conservation; in 2015, the creek was stocked with 5,670 trout at locations in Allegany and Steuben counties. Anglers may also target small populations of wild brown trout that are found in Mill Creek and Sugar Creek, both of which flow into Canaseraga Creek near Dansville.

Whitewater rafting takes place in the upper reaches of the creek. An eight-mile (13 km) stretch of the creek upstream of Dansville contains class IV and V rapids, although water levels are frequently too low for rafting outside of spring flooding events.

== See also ==
- List of rivers of New York
