= Canaseraga, New York =

- Village
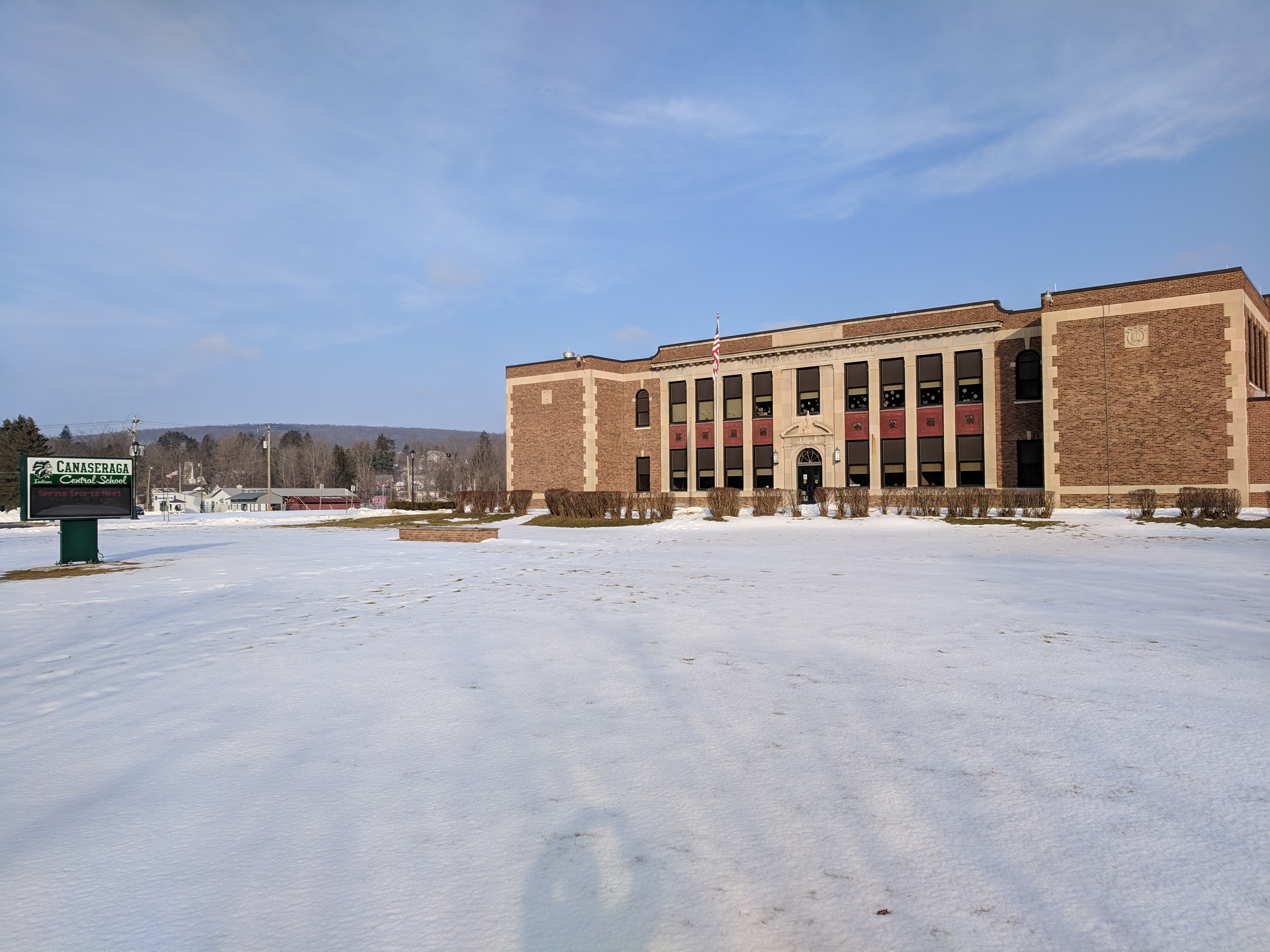
- Canaseraga Central School

- Location within the state of New York
- Coordinates: 42°27′45″N 77°46′36″W
- Country: United States
- State: New York
- County: Allegany
- Town: Burns

Area
  - Total: 1.06 sq mi (2.75 km^{2})
  - Land: 1.06 sq mi (2.75 km^{2})
  - Water: 0 sq mi (0.00 km^{2})
- Elevation: 1,250 ft (381 m)

Population (2020)
  - Total: 460
  - Density: 433.0/sq mi (167.19/km^{2})
- Time zone: UTC-5 (Eastern (EST))
  - Summer (DST): UTC-4 (EDT)
- ZIP code: 14822
- Area code: 607
- FIPS code: 36-12177
- GNIS feature ID: 0945753
- Website: www.canaseraga.gov

Canaseraga is a village in Allegany County, New York, United States. As of the 2020 census, Canaseraga had a population of 460. The name is derived from a creek that flows past the village, which is reportedly a Seneca term for "lying among milkweeds" or "slippery elms".

The village lies in the northern part of the town of Burns at the junction of New York State Route 70 and County Road 13.

== History ==
The community was one of the original settlements in the town, but was subordinate to the community of Burns until circa 1840. The village of Canaseraga was incorporated in 1892. It was originally called "Whitney Valley".

As a result of a fire the town is now much smaller than it once was. Many residents travel to nearby communities to shop and attend movies, as Canaseraga is very limited. There is one school, for pre-kindergarten through grade 12. The school offers sports such as soccer, basketball, skiing, track (as of them merging sports with Arkport), and baseball/softball, but lacks other sports such as football. Canaseraga has a Fall Harvest Festival which offers several activities for families.

The Canaseraga Four Corners Historic District was listed on the NRHP in 2002.

== Geography ==
According to the United States Census Bureau, the village has a total area of 1.06 square miles (2.75 km^{2}), all land.

The village is next to Canaseraga Creek, a tributary of the Genesee River. Bennett Creek and Slader Creek join Canaseraga Creek west of the village. Canaseraga is just south of Livingston County.

== Demographics ==
Historical population
Census	Pop.	Note	%±
1880	791		—
1890	659		−16.7%
1900	685		3.9%
1910	754		10.1%
1920	651		−13.7%
1930	620		−4.8%
1940	698		12.6%
1950	693		−0.7%
1960	730		5.3%
1970	750		2.7%
1980	700		−6.7%
1990	684		−2.3%
2000	594		−13.2%
2010	550		−7.4%
2020	460		−16.4%
U.S. Decennial Census

As of the census of 2000, there were 594 people, 220 households, and 166 families residing in the village. The population density was 465.5 inhabitants per square mile (179.7/km^{2}). There were 253 housing units at an average density of 198.3 per square mile (76.6/km^{2}). The racial makeup of the village was 98.65% White, 0.17% Native American, 0.17% Asian, 0.17% from other races, and 0.84% from two or more races. Hispanic or Latino of any race were 0.17% of the population.

There were 220 households, out of which 36.4% had children under the age of 18 living with them, 57.3% were married couples living together, 13.6% had a female householder with no husband present, and 24.5% were non-families. 20.9% of all households were made up of individuals, and 7.3% had someone living alone who was 65 years of age or older. The average household size was 2.70 and the average family size was 3.02.

In the village, the population was spread out, with 28.8% under the age of 18, 7.6% from 18 to 24, 28.3% from 25 to 44, 23.1% from 45 to 64, and 12.3% who were 65 years of age or older. The median age was 36 years. For every 100 females, there were 104.8 males. For every 100 females age 18 and over, there were 106.3 males.

The median income for a household in the village was $35,469, and the median income for a family was $39,000. Males had a median income of $35,313 versus $20,938 for females. The per capita income for the village was $14,971. About 10.2% of families and 12.8% of the population were below the poverty line, including 23.4% of those under age 18 and 3.1% of those age 65 or over.
