= National Register of Historic Places listings in Morgan County, Alabama =

Location of Morgan County in Alabama

This is a list of the National Register of Historic Places listings in Morgan County, Alabama.

This is intended to be a complete list of the properties and districts on the National Register of Historic Places in Morgan County, Alabama, United States. Latitude and longitude coordinates are provided for many National Register properties and districts; these locations may be seen together in an online map.

There are 19 properties and districts listed on the National Register in the county.

This National Park Service list is complete through NPS recent listings posted January 16, 2026.

== Current listings ==
	Name on the Register	Image	Date listed	Location	City or town	Description
1	Bank Street-Old Decatur Historic District	Bank Street-Old Decatur Historic District	March 27, 1980 (#80000731)	Bank St.; also roughly bounded by Bank, Market, Well and Lee Sts. 34°36′36″N 86°59′06″W	Decatur	Second set of boundaries represent a boundary increase of May 16, 1985, the Bank Street-Old Decatur Historic District
2	Cotaco Opera House	Cotaco Opera House	April 29, 1986 (#86000914)	115 Johnston St., SE. 34°36′10″N 86°59′09″W	Decatur	
3	Crabb-Stewart-Key House	Crabb-Stewart-Key House	November 18, 2011 (#100004618)	1084 Nat Key Rd. 34°23′34″N 86°51′16″W	Hartselle vicinity	
4	Col. Francis Dancy House	Col. Francis Dancy House	April 28, 1980 (#80000732)	901 Railroad St., NW. 34°36′53″N 86°59′07″W	Decatur	
5	East Old Town Historic District	East Old Town Historic District	December 26, 2012 (#12001079)	NW Church Street to NW Wilson Street; 34°36′59″N 86°59′13″W	Decatur	
6	Forest Home		November 21, 1980 (#80000733)	East of Trinity; 34°36′36″N 87°03′58″W	Trinity	
7	Hartselle Downtown Commercial Historic District	Hartselle Downtown Commercial Historic District	April 22, 1999 (#99000469)	Roughly along Main, Railroad, Hickory, and Sparkman Sts. 34°26′36″N 86°56′03″W	Hartselle	
8	Dr. William E. Murphey House	Dr. William E. Murphey House	July 9, 1986 (#86001547)	Off U.S. Route 72; 34°38′38″N 87°05′53″W	Trinity	One of the oldest frame houses in Alabama, c. 1818, it was destroyed by a tornado on April 27, 2011.
9	New Decatur-Albany Historic District	New Decatur-Albany Historic District	July 7, 1995 (#95000810)	Roughly the 100 block of NE. 2nd Ave., the eastern side of the 100 block and the western side of the 300 block of SE. 2nd Ave., and parts of Johnson and Moulton Sts.; also 136 1st Ave., NE.; also roughly bounded by Moulton St East: 4th and 5th Aves: Grant and Jackson Sts SE: and the Louisville & Nashville Railroad corridor. 34°36′11″N 86°59′06″W	Decatur	Second and third sets of boundaries represents boundary changes approved February 12, 1999 and December 19, 2025
10	New Decatur-Albany Residential Historic District	New Decatur-Albany Residential Historic District	February 3, 1983 (#83002981)	Roughly bounded by Gordon Dr., Summerville Rd., Jackson, 8th, Moulton, 6th, and 4th Aves.; also Grant, Jackson, and Sherman Sts. and Gordon and Prospect Drs. 34°36′00″N 86°58′40″W	Decatur	Second set of boundaries represent a boundary increase of April 14, 2004, the New Decatur-Albany Residential Historic District. Originally enlisted as Albany Heritage Neighborhood Historic District.
11	Princess Theatre	Princess Theatre	December 18, 2025 (#100012405)	112 2nd Avenue NE; 34°36′16″N 86°59′05″W	Decatur	
12	Rhea-McEntire House	Rhea-McEntire House	August 30, 1984 (#84000715)	1105 Sycamore St. 34°37′02″N 86°59′05″W	Decatur	
13	Green Pryor Rice House	Green Pryor Rice House	July 9, 1986 (#86001546)	Junction of Madison and Monroe Sts. 34°28′27″N 86°47′43″W	Somerville	
14	Simpson's Florist		November 6, 2023 (#100009550)	902 6th Avenue SE; 34°35′41″N 86°58′48″W	Decatur	
15	Somerville Courthouse	Somerville Courthouse	March 24, 1972 (#72000177)	State Route 36; 34°28′22″N 86°47′54″W	Somerville	The Somerville Courthouse was built in 1837 in the Federal style. It served as the county courthouse for Morgan County until the county seat was moved from Somerville to Decatur in 1891.
16	Southern Railway Depot	Southern Railway Depot	March 10, 1980 (#80004470)	701 Railroad St., NW. 34°36′49″N 86°59′12″W	Decatur	
17	State Bank Building, Decatur Branch	State Bank Building, Decatur Branch	March 24, 1972 (#72000176)	925 Bank St., NE. 34°36′52″N 86°59′01″W	Decatur	
18	West Old Town Historic District	West Old Town Historic District	December 26, 2012 (#12001080)	NW Alma Street to NW Vine Street; 34°37′06″N 86°59′39″W	Decatur	
19	Westview	Westview	January 18, 1982 (#82002068)	South of Decatur; 34°29′55″N 86°55′52″W	Decatur	

== See also ==
- List of National Historic Landmarks in Alabama
- National Register of Historic Places listings in Alabama
