= Edgerley =

Edgerley may refer to:

== Places ==
=== Australia ===
- Edgerley, Elizabeth Bay, a heritage-listed house in Sydney, New South Wales

=== United Kingdom ===
- Edgerley, Cheshire, a civil parish in Cheshire, England
- Edgerley, Shropshire, a location in England

=== United States ===
- Edgerley (Oakland, New York), a historic house in Livingston County, New York, United States

== People ==
- John Edgerley, New Zealand botanist
- Kate Edgerley, New Zealand botanist
- Sir Steyning Edgerley, British administrator in India

== See also ==
- Edgerly, a similar name
