= Hunt, New York =

- Census-designated place
- Location within New York Location within the United States
- Coordinates: 42°32′49″N 77°59′39″W
- Country: United States
- State: New York
- County: Livingston
- Town: Portage

Area
  - Total: 0.12 sq mi (0.31 km^{2})
  - Land: 0.12 sq mi (0.31 km^{2})
  - Water: 0 sq mi (0.00 km^{2})
- Elevation: 1,342 ft (409 m)

Population (2020)
  - Total: 62
  - Density: 520.6/sq mi (201.01/km^{2})
- Time zone: UTC-5 (Eastern (EST))
  - Summer (DST): UTC-4 (EDT)
- ZIP code: 14846
- Area code: 585
- GNIS feature ID: 953452
- FIPS code: 36-36156

Hunt is a hamlet and census-designated place (CDP) in Livingston County, New York, United States. As of the 2020 census, Hunt had a population of 62. Hunt has a post office with ZIP code 14846.

== History ==
The G.A.R. Memorial Hall on Main Street was added to the National Register of Historic Places in 2006.

== Geography ==
Hunt is just south of the center of the town of Portage in the southwestern corner of Livingston County. It is 0.8 miles (1.3 km) southwest of New York State Route 70 via County Route 7 (Main Street) from Hunt Hollow. Hunt is 4 miles (6 km) southwest of Nunda, 4.5 miles (7.2 km) southeast of Portageville on the Genesee River, and 21 miles (34 km) southwest of Geneseo, the Livingston county seat.

According to the U.S. Census Bureau, the Hunt CDP has an area of 0.119 square miles (0.31 km^{2}), all land.

== Demographics ==
Historical population
Census	Pop.	Note	%±
2020	62		—
U.S. Decennial Census

== Sports ==
- Hunt Raceway was a 1/4-mile (0.40 km) dirt oval racing facility operated by Orvel Smith from circa 1956 until 1962. The raceway was one of a series of venues in the Twin Tiers region of New York and Pennsylvania where drivers began their careers before becoming known on the state and national scene. (Note: Geolocation of Hunt Raceway: 42.5667°N 77.9988°W)
