= Portage, New York =

- Town
- Location within New York Location within the United States
- Coordinates: 42°33′36″N 77°59′04″W
- Country: United States
- State: New York
- County: Livingston

Government
  - Type: Town Council
  - Town Supervisor: Ivan C. Davis (D, R)
  - Town Council: Members' List: • Harlan D. James (D, R); • John Thompson (D, R); • Thomas Allen (R); • David Krenzer (D, R)

Area
  - Total: 26.64 sq mi (68.99 km^{2})
  - Land: 26.40 sq mi (68.37 km^{2})
  - Water: 0.24 sq mi (0.61 km^{2}) 0%
- Elevation: 1,200 ft (370 m)

Population (2010)
  - Total: 884
  - Estimate (2016): 855
  - Density: 32/sq mi (12.5/km^{2})
- ZIP Codes: 14846 (Hunt); 14836 (Dalton); 14517 (Nunda)
- FIPS code: 36-051-59179

Portage is a town in the southwest corner of Livingston County, New York, United States. The town is at the south end of Letchworth State Park. The name of the town stems from the need to portage (carry) canoes around the falls of the Genesee River. The population of Portage was 884 at the 2010 census.

== History ==
The ancestral home of the Haudenosaunee, European American settlers arrived in the Portage area by the early 1800s. Portage was formed from part of the town of Nunda in 1827.

The Erie Railroad Company built a wooden trestle bridge over the Genesee River just above the Upper Falls in the mid-1800s. Construction started on July 1, 1851, and the bridge opened on August 14, 1852. At the time, it was the longest and tallest wooden bridge in the world. In the early morning hours of May 6, 1875, the bridge was destroyed in a tremendous fire.

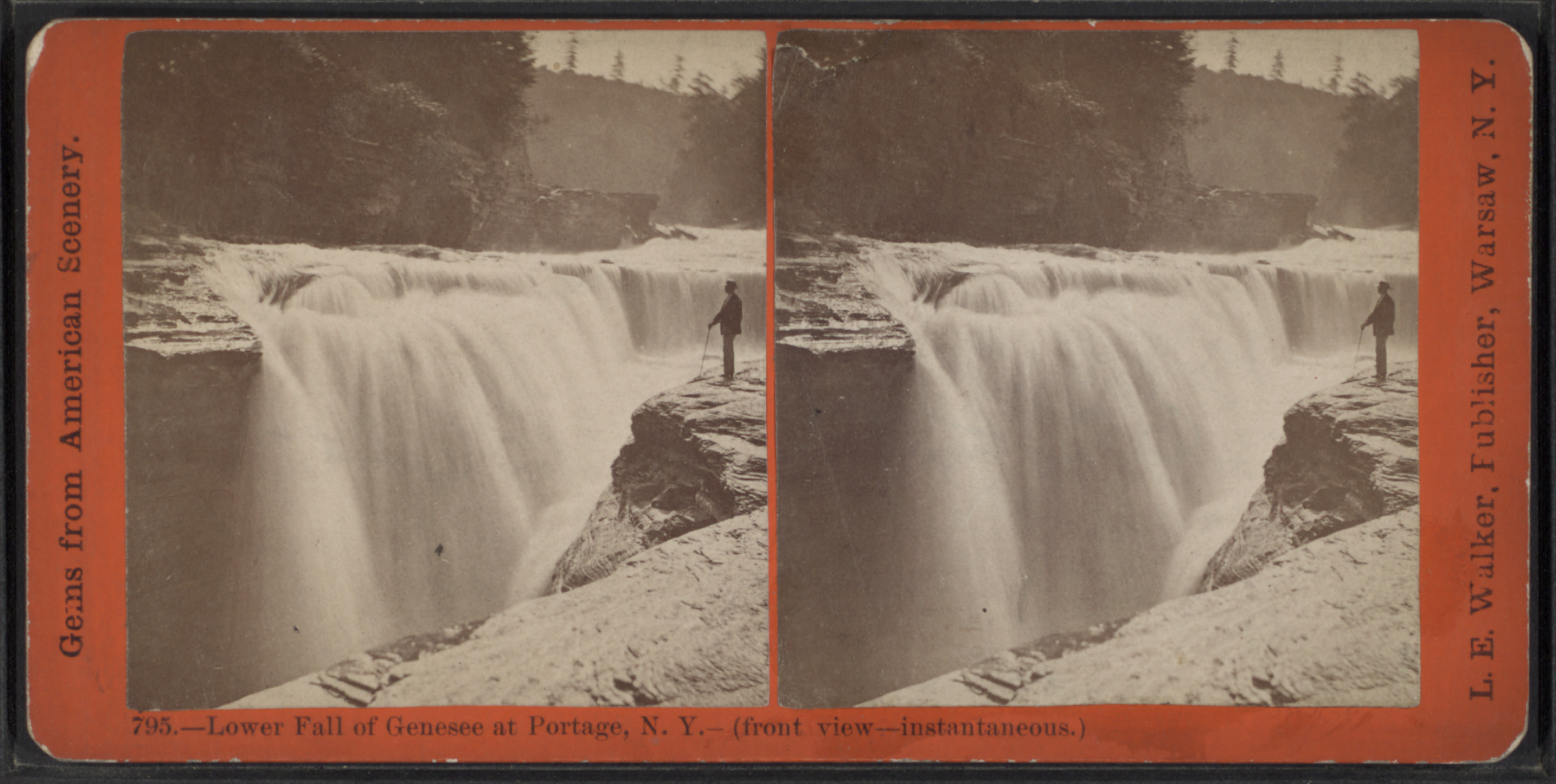
Lower fall of Genesee at Portage stereoscopic image by L. E. Walker

Immediately after the fire, officials of the Erie Railroad Company moved quickly to replace the wooden bridge with one built of iron and steel. Construction began on June 8, 1875, and the bridge opened for traffic on July 31, 1875, It was used until December 10, 2017, making the current Genesee Arch Bridge the third bridge at that site.

== Geography ==
According to the United States Census Bureau, the town has a total area of 26.6 square miles (69.0 km^{2}), of which 26.4 square miles (68.4 km^{2}) are land and 0.23 square miles (0.6 km^{2}), or 0.89%, are water.

The western border of the town is formed by the Genesee River and the Genesee River Gorge. The west town line is the border of Wyoming County, and the south town line is the border of Allegany County.

New York State Route 436 is an east-west highway across the town, that intersects New York State Route 70 west of the community of Oakland.

=== Adjacent towns and areas ===
Portage is bounded on the east by the town of Nunda and on the north by the town of Mount Morris. To the south are the towns of Hume, Granger and Grove in Allegany County. To the west is the town of Genesee Falls in Wyoming County, on the opposite side of the Genesee River.

== Demographics ==
Historical population
| Census | Pop. | Note | %± |
|---|---|---|---|
| 1850 | 2,478 | | — |
| 1860 | 1,519 | | −38.7% |
| 1870 | 1,338 | | −11.9% |
| 1880 | 1,295 | | −3.2% |
| 1890 | 1,130 | | −12.7% |
| 1900 | 1,029 | | −8.9% |
| 1910 | 1,273 | | 23.7% |
| 1920 | 860 | | −32.4% |
| 1930 | 793 | | −7.8% |
| 1940 | 945 | | 19.2% |
| 1950 | 737 | | −22.0% |
| 1960 | 733 | | −0.5% |
| 1970 | 731 | | −0.3% |
| 1980 | 771 | | 5.5% |
| 1990 | 893 | | 15.8% |
| 2000 | 859 | | −3.8% |
| 2010 | 884 | | 2.9% |
| 2016 (est.) | 855 | | −3.3% |
U.S. Decennial Census

As of the census of 2000, there were 859 people, 308 households, and 232 families residing in the town. The population density was 32.6 inhabitants per square mile (12.6/km^{2}). There were 352 housing units at an average density of 13.3 per square mile (5.1/km^{2}). The racial makeup of the area was 97.09% White, 0.12% African American, 0.23% Native American, 0.35% Asian, and 2.21% from two or more races. Hispanic or Latino of any race were 0.81% of the population.

There were 308 households, out of which 40.3% had children under the age of 18 living with them, 56.2% were married couples living together, 10.1% had a female householder with no husband present, and 24.4% were non-families. 16.9% of all households were made up of individuals, and 8.1% had someone living alone who was 65 years of age or older. The average household size was 2.79 and the average family size was 3.11.

In the town, the population was spread out, with 30.7% under the age of 18, 6.9% from 18 to 24, 28.4% from 25 to 44, 23.2% from 45 to 64, and 10.8% who were 65 years of age or older. The median age was 35 years. For every 100 females, there were 101.6 males. For every 100 females age 18 and over, there were 100.3 males.

The median income for a household in the town was $32,500, and the median income for a family was $38,750. Males had a median income of $29,000 versus $18,846 for females. The per capita income for the town was $13,717. About 9.2% of families and 14.0% of the population were below the poverty line, including 16.3% of those under the age of 18 and 14.1% ages 65 or older.

== Communities and locations in the Town of Portage ==
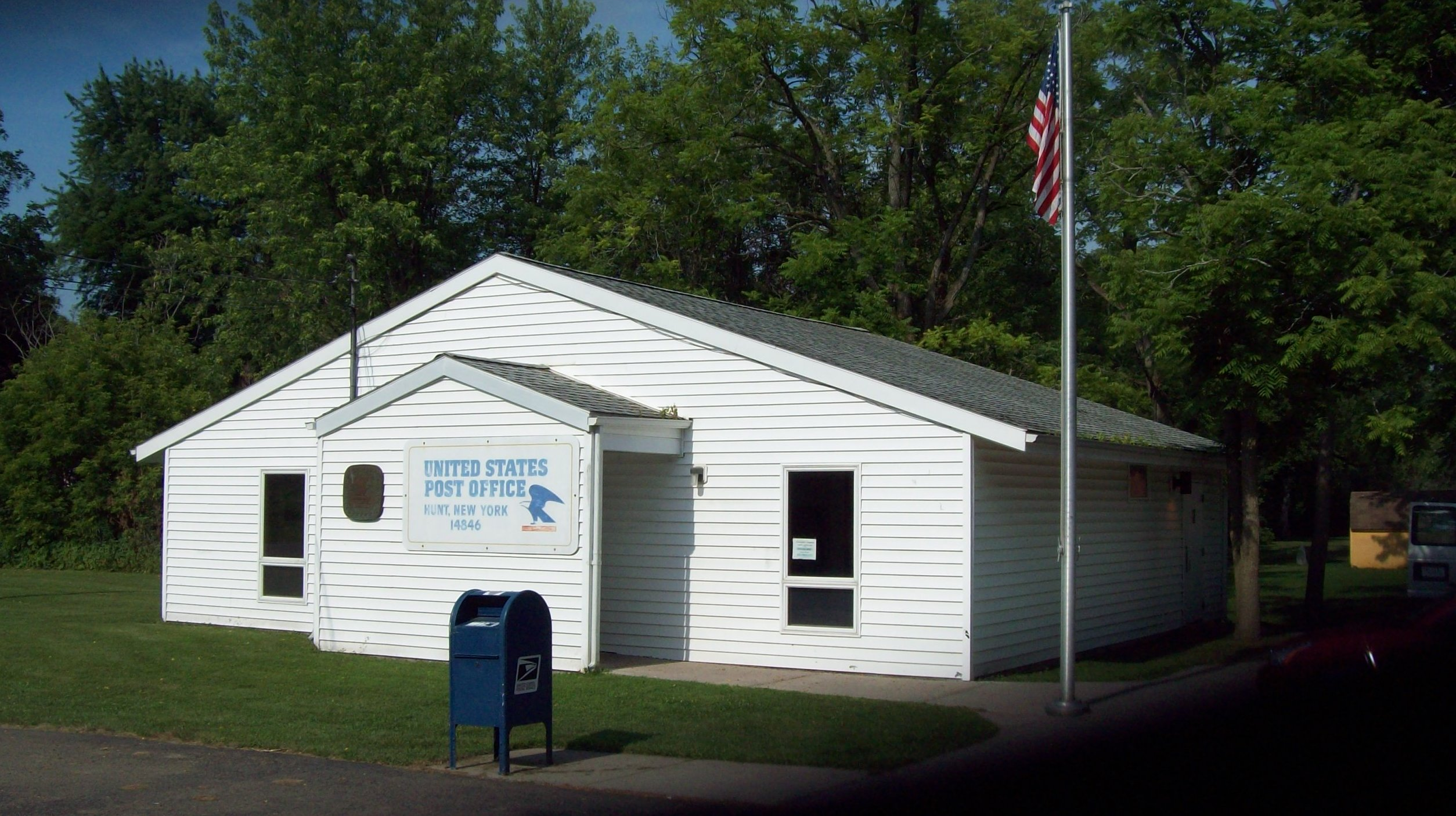
US Post Office-Hunt NY, July 2011

- Dalton – A hamlet (and census-designated place) on the east town line.
- Deowesta – A former native town near the portage of the Genesee River. It had a strategic hilltop location along a trade route.
- Hunt – A hamlet (and census-designated place) west of Hunt Hollow on Main Street. The G.A.R. Memorial Hall was added to the National Register of Historic Places in 2006.
- Hunt Hollow – A hamlet on NY-70 in the center of the town.
- Keshequa Creek – A stream flowing through the town.
- Oakland – A hamlet in the northern part of the town on Route 436. Edgerley was added to the National Register of Historic Places in 1980.
- Portage – A hamlet on the western border of the town south of the Upper, Middle, and Lower Falls on the Genesee River. The hamlet in located on NY-436 across the river from Portageville which is located in Wyoming County. It was formerly called "Portage Station."
