= Rackliffe House (Assateague State Park) =

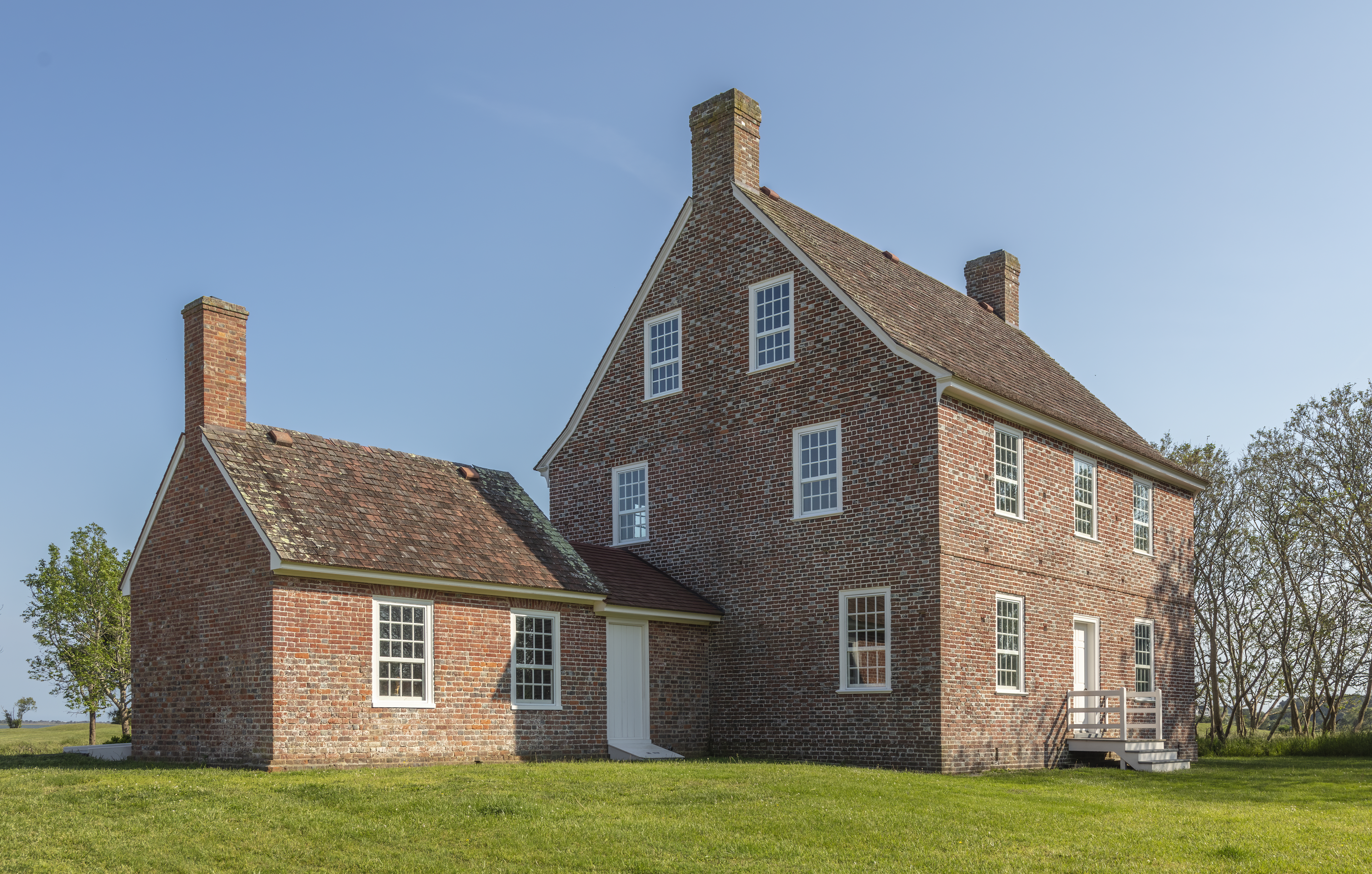
- Rackliffe House in 2022

- Location within Maryland
- Established: 1752
- Location: 11700 Tom Patton Lane, Berlin, Maryland, 21811; Assateague State Park, Assateague Island, Maryland
- Coordinates: 38.24617064915603°N 75.16089053652732°W
- Type: Historic house museum
- Founders: Charles Rackliffe (1752); Tom Patton (2010)
- President: Susan Cropper
- Curator: Tina Busko (Executive Director)
- Website: www.rackliffehouse.org

Rackliffe House is a restored 18th-century coastal plantation house overlooking Sinepuxent Bay. The house is located at 11700 Tom Patton Lane, Berlin, Maryland, 21811, within walking distance of the Assateague Island Visitor Center at Assateague State Park, Maryland. Built of Flemish bond brick with random glazed headers, the house would have been "one of the most impressive gentry dwellings in the region" in the 18th century. The plantation house is one of a small number of remaining tidewater dwellings from colonial times, and may be the only one of its kind and vintage in the Mid-Atlantic region that is open to the public.

== History ==
The earliest known inhabitants of the area around Rackliffe House were the Assateague Indians, who maintained a hunting camp there. In 1679, a grant for 2200 acres of land, an area reaching from Southpointe to Mystic Harbor, was given to Charles Rackliffe and his brother-in-law Edward Wale. Originally known as Genezeer, it is the oldest property owned by colonists in Northern Worcester County.

The two-story and the half story 38-by-32-foot house were built of double pile bricks around 1752, by Captain Charles Rackliffe. With large windows, set on an elevated location, the Rackliffe's "Manor Place" offered its inhabitants views of Sinepuxent Bay and the Atlantic Ocean, allowing them to keep an eye on shipping traffic. The kitchen was separate, connected to the main two-story house by a hyphen.

African-American slaves on the plantation raised tobacco, corn and wheat. A 1790 inventory of Rackliffe's "possessions" included 10 slaves, 9 horses, 220 head of cattle, 120 head of sheep, 62 hogs, and 28,000 pounds of tobacco.

The Rackliffe House survived the American Revolutionary War, the War of 1812, and the American Civil War. Local folklore claims that upper stories of the house sustained fire damage in an attack during the Revolutionary War.

In the early 19th century the house changed hands several times. A fire gutted the house in 1929. It was later rebuilt, with a white stucco exterior over the original brick. In 1996, the state of Maryland acquired the house and 114 acres.

== Rackliffe House Trust ==
The Rackliffe House Trust was created in 2004, by Tom Patton, a descendant of the Rackliffe and Wale families. Patton, the founding President of the Rackliffe House Trust, envisioned the House as a site for coastal heritage interpretation. Patton died in October 2010, before the house was opened, but work has continued under Trust president Joan Jenkins.

An extensive review of the site, the construction of the buildings, and the house's history was completed as part of its restoration plan in 2007.

The Trust is now operating the structure and surrounding three acres of property as a Coastal Maryland Heritage Center, under a 50-year lease from the Maryland Department of Natural resources. The three-acre site is part of 110-acre tract that is contained within Assateague Island State Park.

The Trust has worked with the Maryland Department of Natural Resources and the Assateague State Park to raise more than $800,000 in funding for the restoration of Rackliffe House and archeological examination of the property. The main areas restored include the colonial residence, its attached kitchen, and the milk house. The work done has included removal of 1920's interior woodwork, reconstruction of four original fireplaces, construction of a new roof in the architectural style of the mid-1700s, and repair and repointing of damaged walls with period bricks. Areas of the walls were 18 inches thick at the base and a foot at the top. Wiring, heating, air conditioning and plumbing have also been installed.

The house first opened for public tours in 2012, attracting more than 1,100 visitors.

== Archaeological work ==
The area is a potential site for both prehistoric and early 1700s archaeological work. A number of additional buildings were located, at various times, on the property. A graveyard is also believed to have been nearby, but its exact location is unknown. There are fears that important sites may already be lost, due to long-term changes in climate and shoreline, and more recently to golf course development.

An initial three-week dig in 2010, led by archaeologists Aaron Levinthal and Ryun Papson, mapped the site by digging 300 small holes to take soil samples. They used that information to identify three-foot square units to examine in more detail. "Three-quarters of the property has archaeological integrity, which means the soils haven't been severely disturbed." Among their discoveries were pieces of pre-1650 Native American pottery, a possible dumping ground in a swampy area, and a buried brick walkway. More than 40 volunteers were involved in working at the site.

== Access ==
As part of Assateague State Park, the Rackliffe property is open during the day from dawn to dusk. Year-round, visitors can explore the grounds and see the exterior of the house and milk house. They are requested to park at the Assateague Island Visitor Center. From there, they can walk to the House along Tom Patton Lane. New hiking trails are being planned to offer a more scenic path. The house itself is only open for tours on specified days during the summer.
