= Edgerly =

Edgerly is a surname. The name may refer to:

== People ==
=== Surname ===
- Brian Edgerly (born 1943), American baseball player
- Chris Edgerly (born 1969), American voice actor, comedian and singer
- Clara Power Edgerly (died 1896), American elocutionist
- Edward Edgerly, American politician in Pennsylvania
- Mira Edgerly-Korzybska (1872–1954), American painter
- Webster Edgerly (1852–1926), American social reform activist
- Winfield Scott Edgerly (1846–1927), United States Army officer

=== Middle name ===
- Gladys Edgerly Bates (1896–2003), American sculptor
- Peter Edgerly Firchow (1937–2008), American literary scholar and educator
- George Edgerly Harris III (1949–1982), birth name of Hibiscus, American actor and performance artist
- Dan Zanes (born 1961; Daniel Edgerly Zanes), American musician

== Other uses ==
- Edgerly Island, an island in Napa County, California, U.S.

== See also ==
- Edgerley (disambiguation)
