= Bank Street Historic District =

Bank Street Historic District may refer to:

- Bank Street-Old Decatur Historic District, in Decatur, Alabama, listed on the National Register of Historic Places (NRHP)
- Bank Street Historic District (Waterbury, Connecticut), listed on the NRHP
- North Main-Bank Streets Historic District, in Albion, New York, listed on the NRHP.
