= Dancy–Polk House =

Historic house in Alabama, United States

- U.S. National Register of Historic Places
- Alabama Register of Landmarks and Heritage
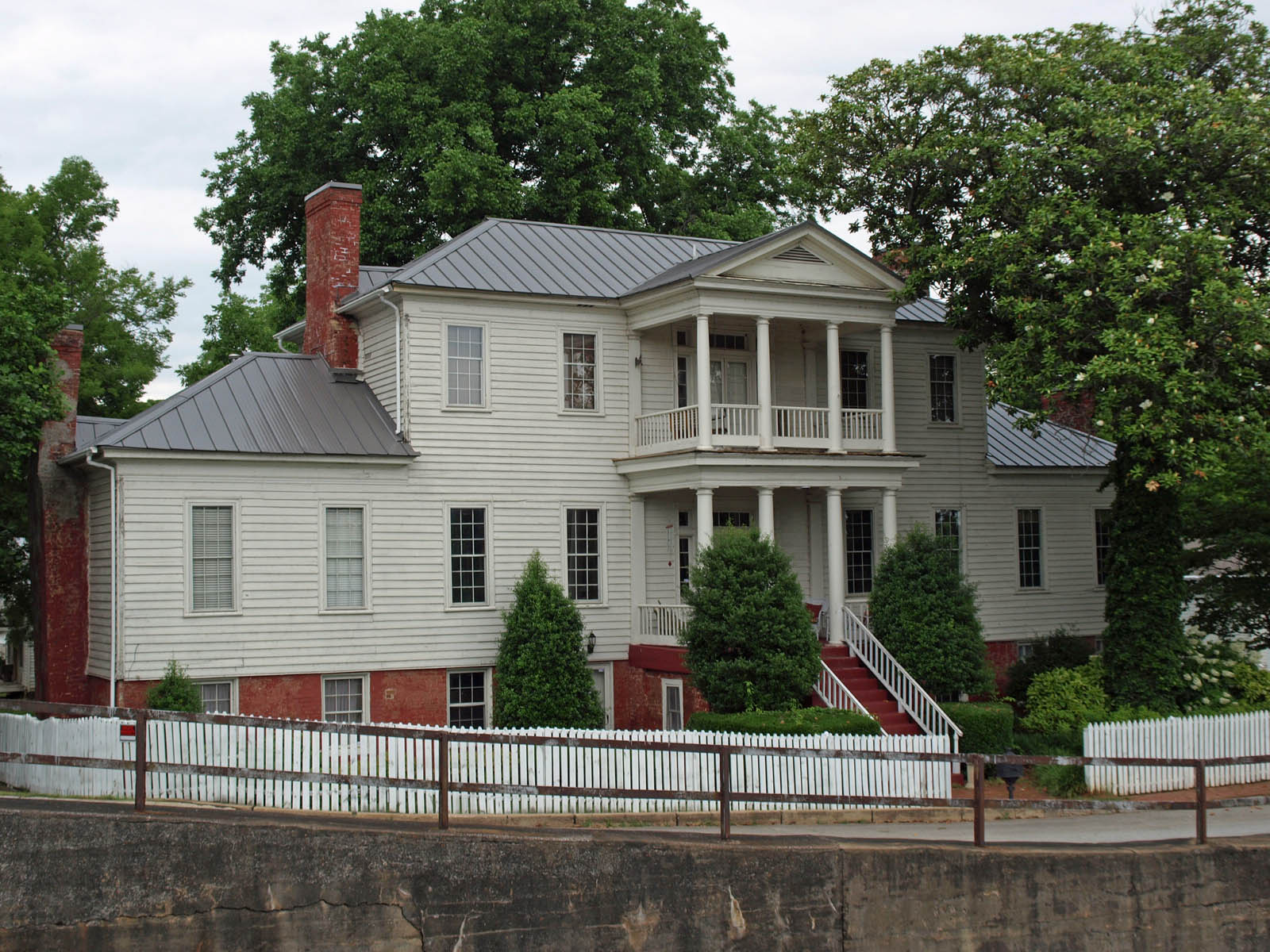
- The house in June 2013

- Location within Alabama Location within the United States
- Location: 901 Railroad St., Decatur, Alabama
- Coordinates: 34°36′53″N 86°59′7″W
- Built: 1829
- Architectural style: Georgian
- NRHP reference No.: 80000732

Significant dates
- Added to NRHP: April 28, 1980
- Designated ARLH: October 11, 1978

The Dancy–Polk House (also known as the Col. Francis Dancy House) is a historic residence in Decatur, Alabama. The house was built in 1829 for Colonel Francis Dancy, an early settler in the area, who later moved to Franklin, LA. It is the oldest building in Decatur, and one of only four to survive the Civil War (the others being the Old State Bank, the Rhea–McEntire House, and the Todd House in the Bank Street–Old Decatur Historic District). Dancy came to North Alabama from southern Virginia, and built a Georgian house popular in his homeland. The two-story frame house has a double-height portico with four Doric columns on each level. The house was listed on the Alabama Register of Landmarks and Heritage in 1978 and the National Register of Historic Places in 1980.
