= John Edgerley =

English-born New Zealand botanist

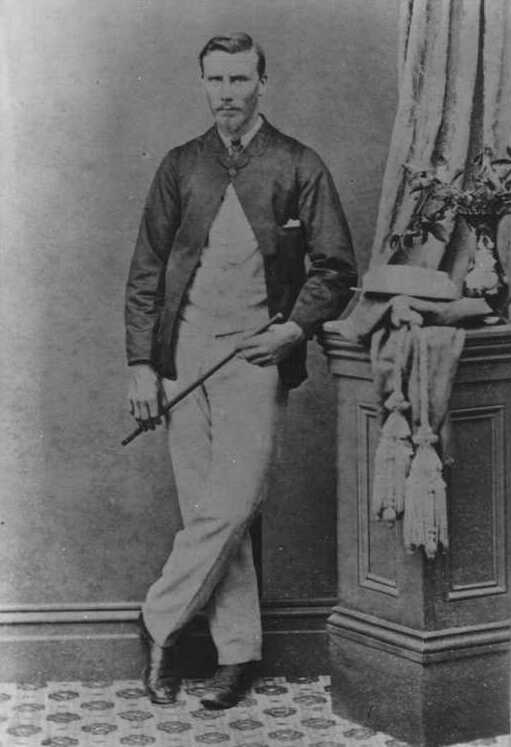
- Edgerley in 1840
- Born: John Edgerley; Circa 1814; Staffordshire, England
- Died: 1849; Auckland, New Zealand
- Scientific career
- Fields: Botany

John Edgerley was a pioneering botanist in New Zealand.

== Biography ==
John Edgerley was born about 1814, probably in Upper Arley, then Staffordshire England and worked as a gardener at Arley Hall. He migrated to New Zealand in 1834 on the sailing ship Emma Eugenia ex the Downs, arrived en route at Sydney on 10 May 1835 and reached the Hokianga 30 July. He spent the years to 1841 at Horeke in the Hokianga as gardener/botanist for Lieutenant Thomas McDonnell, who had been appointed an additional British Resident in New Zealand - they had travelled out together. He brought plants with him from England and when Edward Wakefield visited Horeke in 1839 he found a flourishing garden. There are records in England of John Edgerley sending plant specimens and live plants to Kew Gardens, Mr. A. B. Lambert and the Earl of Mountnorris. Auckland Museum has 8 letters written by John Edgerley to A B Lambert, J. Smith (curator at Kew) and Sir William Hooker concerned with the collecting of New Zealand plants for English collections, including “the royal gardens”. Subsequently, Edgerley returned to England with both live and dried plants and was at Arley Hall again in April 1842.

When John Edgerley sailed for England in 1842 he had taken back a collection of New Zealand plants for Kew Gardens. In return, the director of Kew, Sir William Hooker, undertook to provide him with a wide range of flowering shrubs (six casefuls) for setting up his nursery on this land in Epsom. Edgerley requested the following plants: “Rhododendrons, camellias, arbutus or strawberry tree, laurustine, Portugal laurel, common laurel, azaleas, a plant or two of lilac, wisteria sinensis, tree paeonia, with a few plants of fuchsias – corymbiflora if you can spare it, ribes sanguinea, magnolia grandiflora, deutzia scabra, box for hedging, with a few good roses, white moss if you can spare it, ajuga japonica, cedar of Lebanon, jasminum…acorns, chestnuts, hawthorn berries or any other seed you thought would germinate, also a small collection of good flower seeds with fir cones” . Although roses, flowering seeds and annuals had been imported by early missionaries, their planting concentrated on practical plants such as fruit trees, shelter trees and crops. Certainly this was the first importation of rhododendrums, camellias, azaleas, lilac and wisteria into New Zealand . He married Sarah Newnham at Upper Arley on 27 December 1842 and they travelled on the Tyne arriving at Hobart August 1843 then coming on to Auckland. It was possible that he leased some land immediately in the Epsom/Newmarket area as in the police census of 1844, he was living in a raupo hut in that location. John Edgerley brought a collection of items out with him including a set of blasting tools, candle snuffers, a tinder box and a humane man trap, these items are now in the Auckland War Memorial Museum.

A New Zealand Crown Grant, of land in the area now called Epsom, dated 21 December 1844 for 6 acres 2 roods was issued to John Kelly and Frederick Whitaker. This land was transferred to John Edgerley on 15 December 1851. On 10 June 1848 John Edgerley obtained a crown grant of 5 acres adjoining this Kelly/Whitaker grant.

At the land in Epsom, including the land now known as 74 and 66 Gillies Ave, he established a nursery which he worked till he died in 1849 at 35 years. By May 1846 he was advertising a large variety of fruit trees for sale, including a dozen varieties of apples at “Eden Nursery”. By 1848 he was advertising twenty four types of apple trees, six types of plum trees, twenty four types of cherry trees, four types of pear trees, five types of peach trees, seven types of nectarines and three types of apricot trees as well as a variety of other plants. Two uncommon shrubs bear Edgerley's name. Pomaderris prunifolia var. edgerleyi and Raukaua edgerleyi. Edgerley served as a judge at the first Agricultural and Horticultural Show, held on 18 December 1843 at Mr Hart's Exchange hotel.

== Family ==
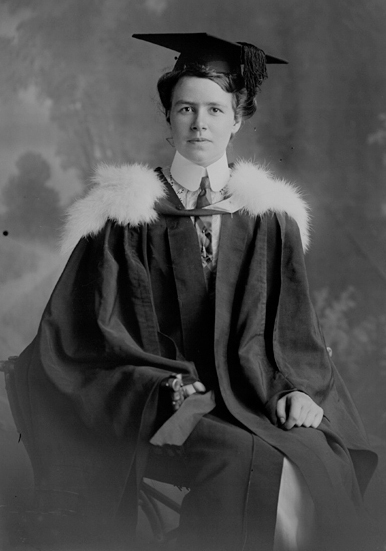
Edgerley's granddaughter, botanist and teacher Kate Edgerley, in 1911

John and Sarah had two boys, John born 26 July 1846 and William born 4 April 1848. A daughter Sarah was born in 1850. In 1852 Sarah Edgerley sold the fruit trees, put cows on the 11 acres and ran a milk supply.

John Edgerley's son, John, was one of the first white people born in Auckland in 1846. According to his own record he was born in the raupo hut on the land at Epsom. He was apprenticed to the building trade, serving in the Remuera and Parnell Volunteers during the land wars, then moved to the Thames gold fields, Fiji and Melbourne. In Fiji he built houses for Missionaries and ran a cotton plantation. He returned in to Epsom in the 1860s and in the early 1880s he went into partnership with his brother William, settling on the land at Epsom and running a building business. Around this time the brothers built a return villa on a high point of their property, incorporating John Edgerley's 1849 house according to family lore and Dinah Holman in “Newmarket lost and found”.

John's wife Sarah died in June 1895 aged 83. 1895 the Edgerley brother were conspicuous attenders at the annual meetings of Epsom ratepayers, usually held in William Edgerley's workshop. John Edgerley was elected to the Epsom Road Board in 1901 and served until April 1920.

In 1903 the Edgerley family sold the upper part of their land to George Goldsboro architect (now 66 Gillies Ave) for £196 and part to Alfred Kidd (now 74 Gillies Ave) for £180. Like Highwic, these properties were chosen because the building platforms, on land rising up the slopes of Mount Eden, had views across the valley and down to the harbour. Around this period, Mr Goldsboro built Mrs Wilson's house at 66 and Mr Kidd built a house at 74 to designs by Mr Goldsbro’. The entrances were from Domain Rd now called Gillies Avenue. The land must have been wooded with volcanic rock forest as there is the large stump of a mature pūriri tree under the Kidd house.

Around 1917, John and William Edgerley sold land to the south of the homestead to allow the Kidd family to extend their gardens . From 1926, the Edgerleys subdivided the property to the east of the homestead creating Edgerley Avenue from the drive to their house. John Edgerley Jr died on 1 October 1942 aged 97 in the house at 11 Edgerley Ave.

In 1942 the homestead was bought by AC Wood who commissioned the Californian architect A B Crocombe to renovate the property. This was done in the “modern American colonial style” and was featured in the New Zealand Institute of Architects ‘Home & Building’ magazine in 1944 as a good example of modernising a villa.

Although the outbuildings, a laundry, a workshop and a woodshed have been demolished the house remains exactly as re-designed in 1943.

Neither The Newmarket Heritage Study, (Report to Focus Newmarket group, Dinah Holman, February 1996) nor Historic Places Trust's submissions to Plan Change 196 make any mention of the Edgerley homestead. Under Plan Change 196, the zoning alters from 7a to 8c – highly intensive high-rise of up to six stories.

In July 2010 the Edgerley homestead was sold by A&C Shaw to Runcorn Hotel Development Corporation, a China-based development company, along with the former Carlton Bowling Club and the former garden of 74 Gillies Ave. The deal for the entire site was in the region of $22 million.

On 16 January 2011, in a telephone conversation with staff of Thresher Urban Design and Landscape Architecture, who have been contracted by Runcorn Hotel Development Corporation to assist them with their planning application, Paul Waite learns that their initial proposals do not include retention of any trees or historic buildings but Runcorn has proposed highly intense development of the site.

In 2011 a demolition permit was issued by Auckland Council for the Edgerley homestead.

Edgerley's granddaughter was Kate Edgerley, botanist and teacher.

== Gallery ==
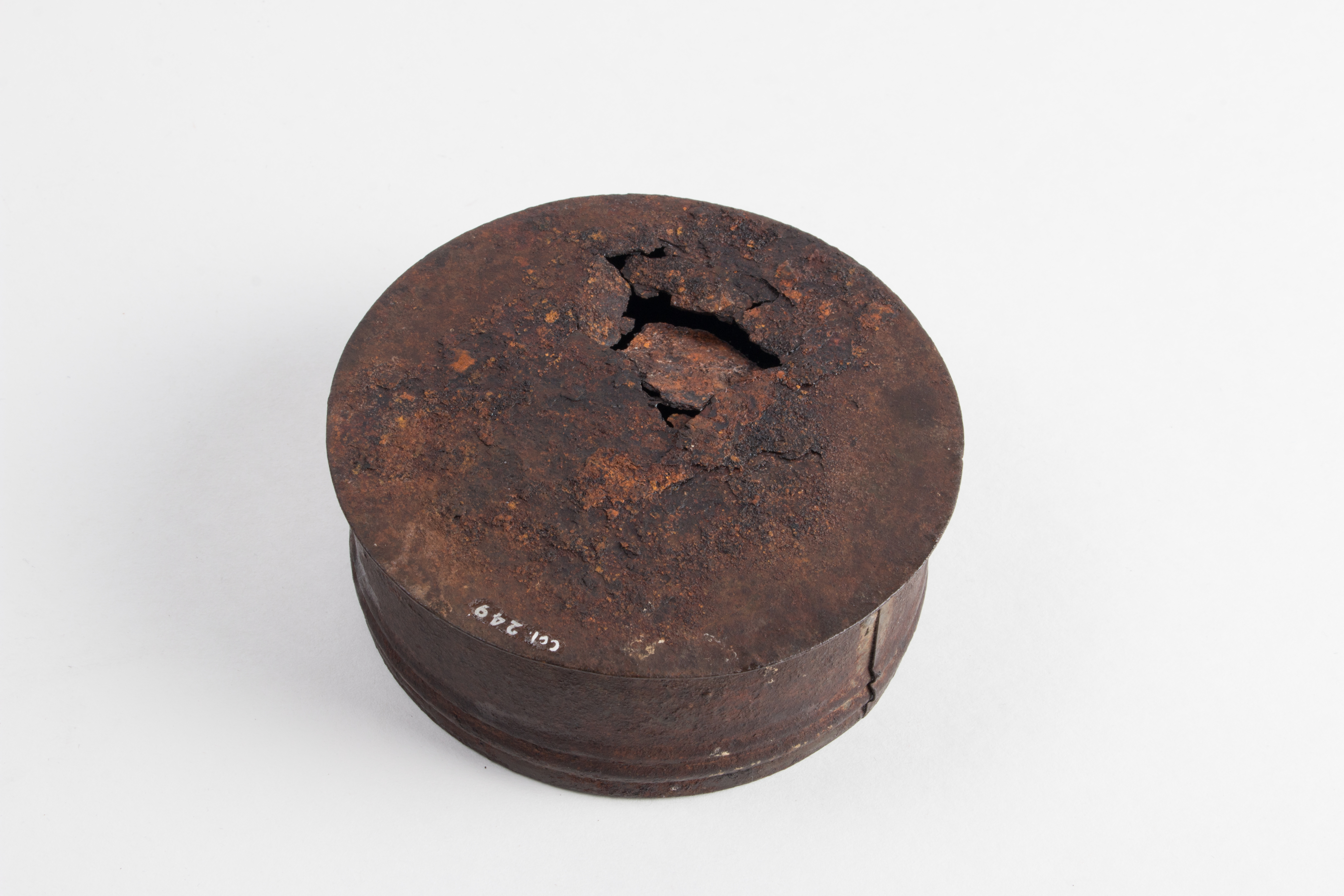
Edgerley's tinderbox

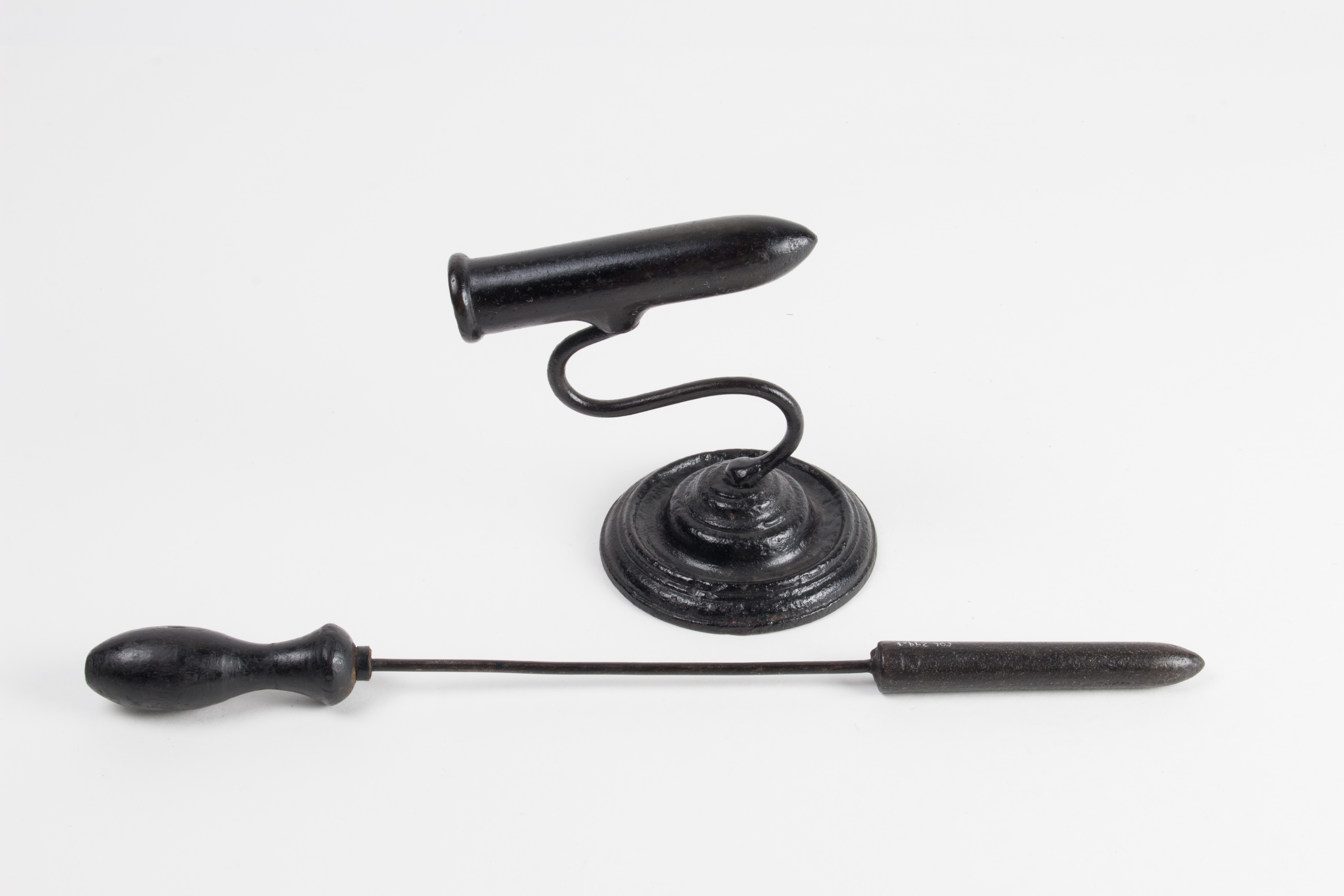
Edgerley's goffering iron

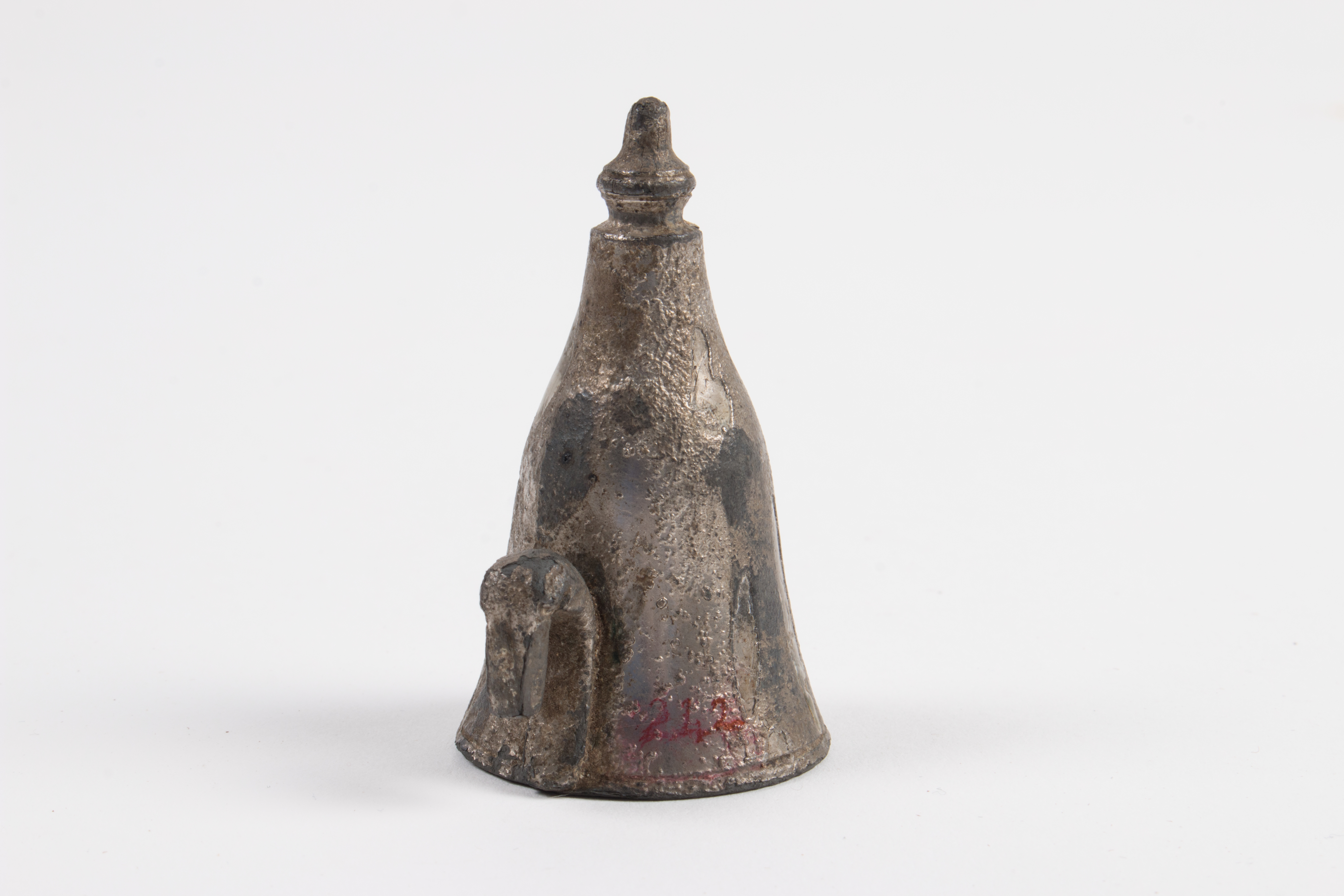
Edgerley's candle snuffer

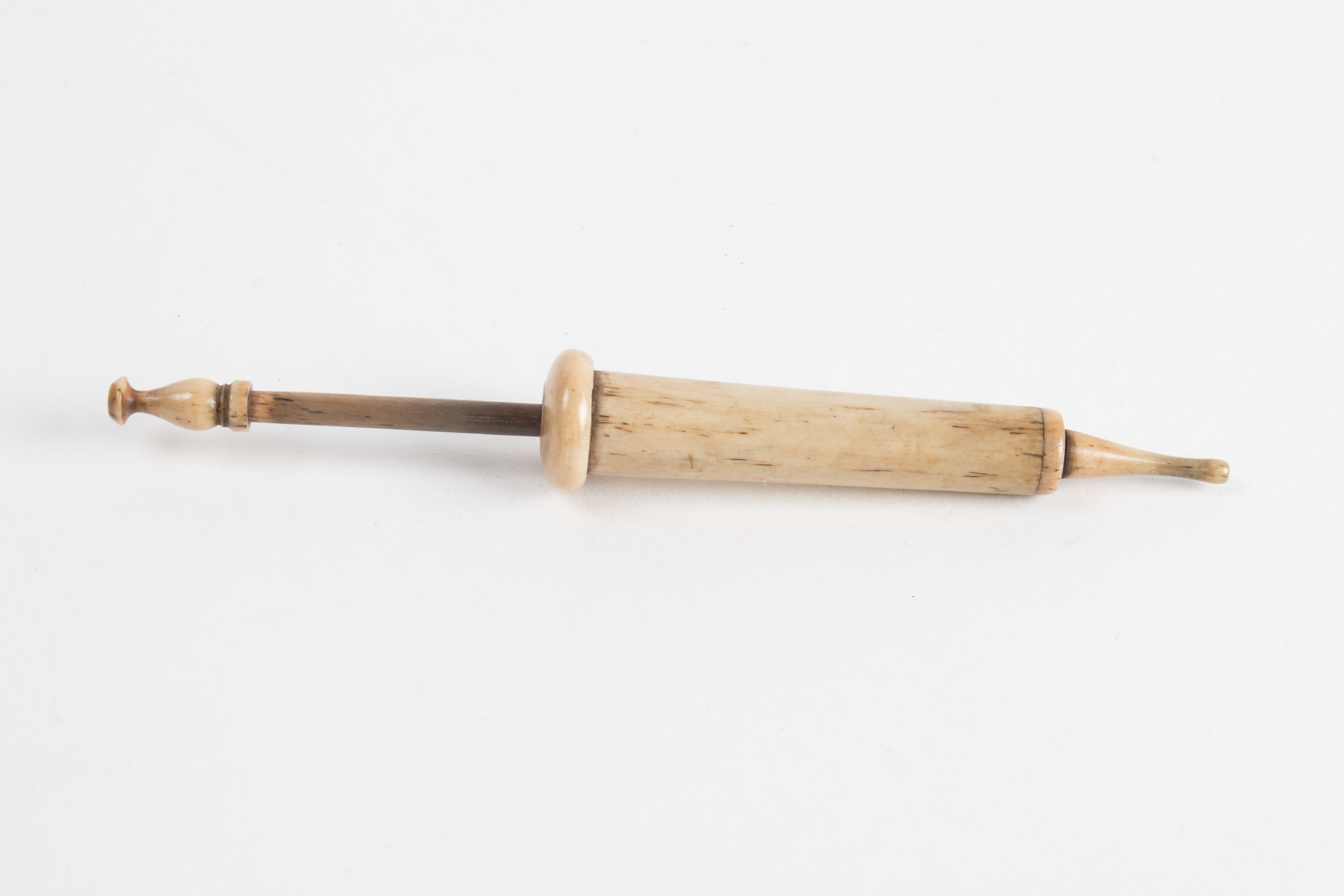
Edgerley's ivory syringe
