= New Decatur–Albany Historic District =

Historic district in Alabama, United States

- U.S. National Register of Historic Places
- U.S. Historic district
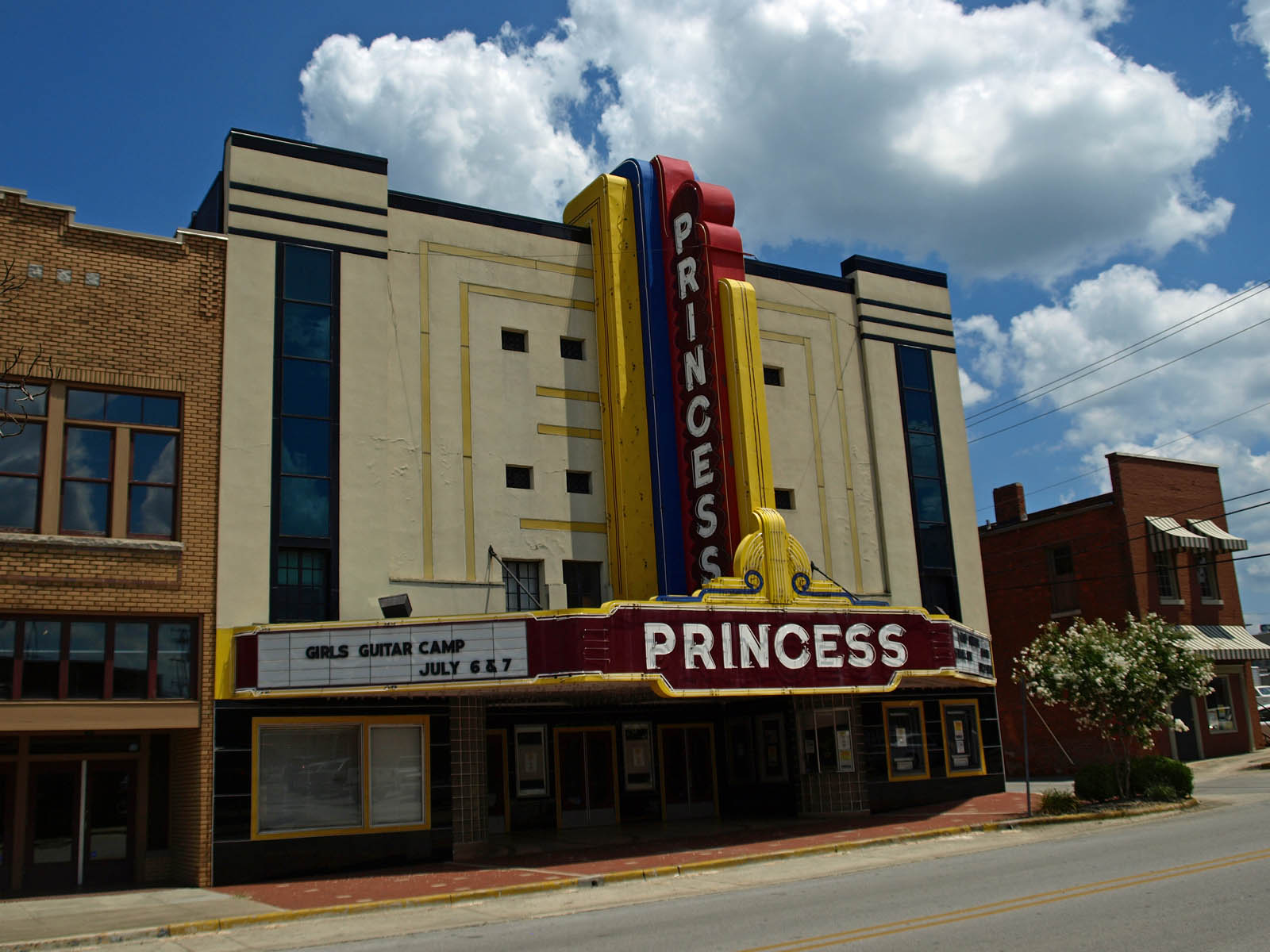
- The Princess Theatre in July 2010

- Location within Alabama Location within the United States
- Location: Roughly, 2nd Ave. (100 block NE., 100 block SE. E side, 300 block SE. W side), parts of Johnson and Moulton Sts., and 136 1st Ave., NE., Decatur, Alabama
- Coordinates: 34°36′11″N 86°59′6″W
- Area: 13 acres (5.3 ha)
- Architectural style: Late Victorian, Late 19th And 20th Century Revivals, Modern Movement
- NRHP reference No.: 95000810 (original); 99000148 (increase 1); 100012398 (increase 2)

Significant dates
- Added to NRHP: July 7, 1995
- Boundary increases: February 12, 1999; December 19, 2025

The New Decatur–Albany Historic District is a historic district in Decatur, Alabama. The district encompasses the commercial district of the former town of New Decatur (briefly renamed Albany). It lies south of the Bank Street-Old Decatur Historic District and east of the New Decatur–Albany Residential Historic District. New Decatur was founded in 1887 as a planned town and suburb of Decatur. The town was renamed Albany in 1916 and merged with "Old" Decatur in 1927.

The district contains 48 buildings centered on 2nd Avenue. Buildings from the late 19th century exhibit more decorated styles, including examples of Romanesque Revival, Victorian, and Renaissance Revival architecture. Early 20th century structures are more restrained, with decoration coming from the building's materials rather than being applied. A few Art Deco and Streamline Moderne buildings dating from the 1920s to 1940s also appear in the district. Notable contributing properties include the Princess Theatre, an Art Deco cinema-turned-theater, and the Cotaco Opera House, built in 1890.

The district was listed on the National Register of Historic Places in 1995. The Decatur Light, Power, and Fuel Company complex was added to the district in 1999, but subsequently demolished. The district's boundaries were again adjusted in 2025.
