= Cotaco Opera House =

- U.S. National Register of Historic Places
- U.S. Historic district – Contributing property
- Alabama Register of Landmarks and Heritage
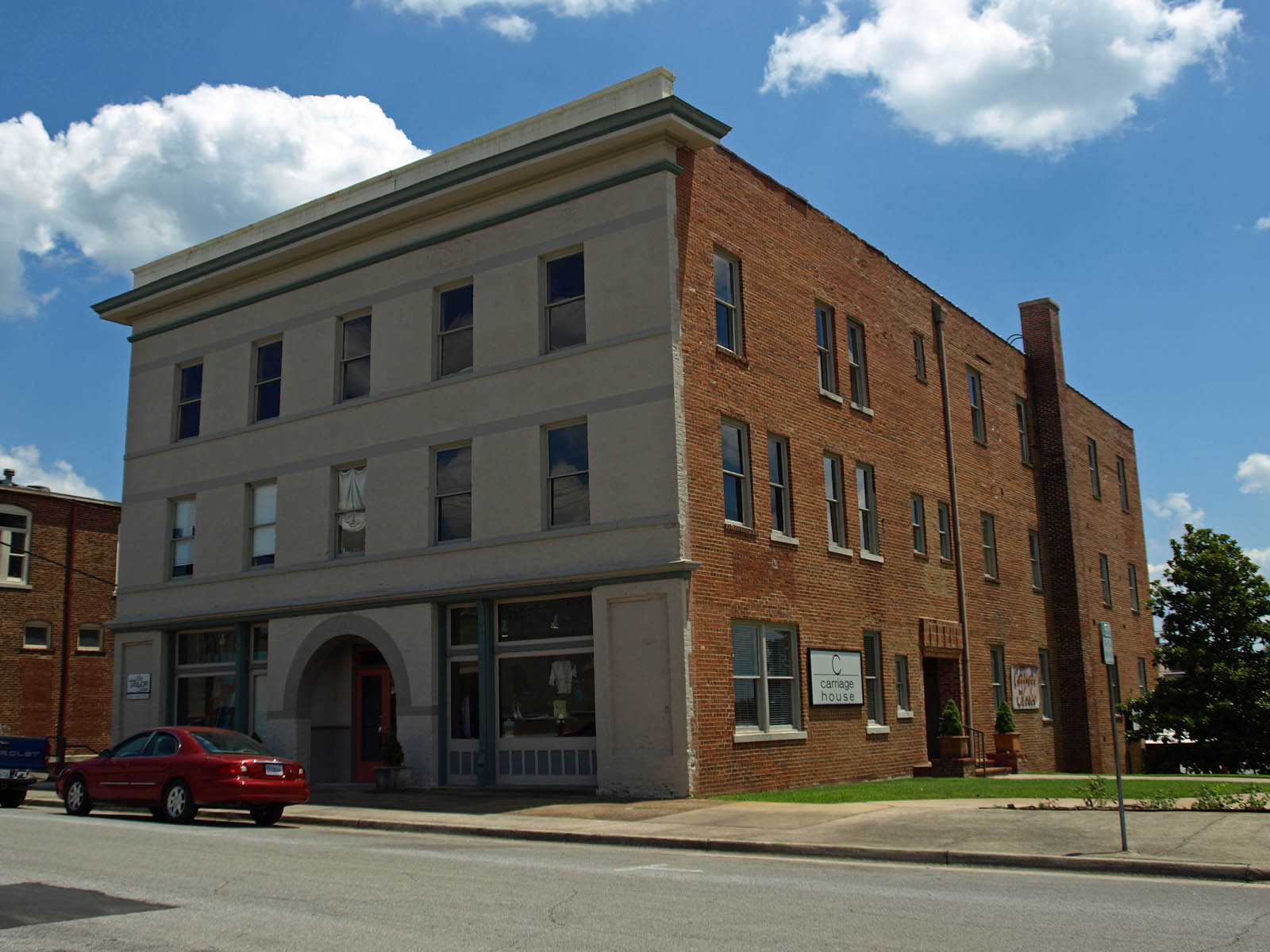
- The Cotaco Opera House in July 2010
- Location: 115 Johnson St. SE, Decatur, Alabama
- Coordinates: 34°36′10″N 86°59′9″W
- Built: 1890
- Part of: New Decatur–Albany Historic District (ID95000810)
- NRHP reference No.: 86000914

Significant dates
- Added to NRHP: April 29, 1986
- Designated CP: July 7, 1995
- Designated ARLH: November 5, 1976

The Cotaco Opera House, also known as Masonic Building, was the first opera house constructed in the state of Alabama. It is located at 115 Johnston Street in historic downtown Decatur, Alabama.

In 1889, the city of Decatur was the largest city in North Alabama, out-sizing Huntsville. It had become increasingly apparent that the city was in need of a theater to showcase its fine arts. The Opera House was built on a 100 by 140 foot site that ran south from Johnston Street and fronting on the east side of 1st Avenue. It was built by the Cotaco Opera House Company, which was incorporated on September 16, 1889.

== See also ==
- National Register of Historic Places listings in Morgan County, Alabama
