= Union Block (Nunda, New York) =

Historic commercial building in New York, United States

- U.S. National Register of Historic Places
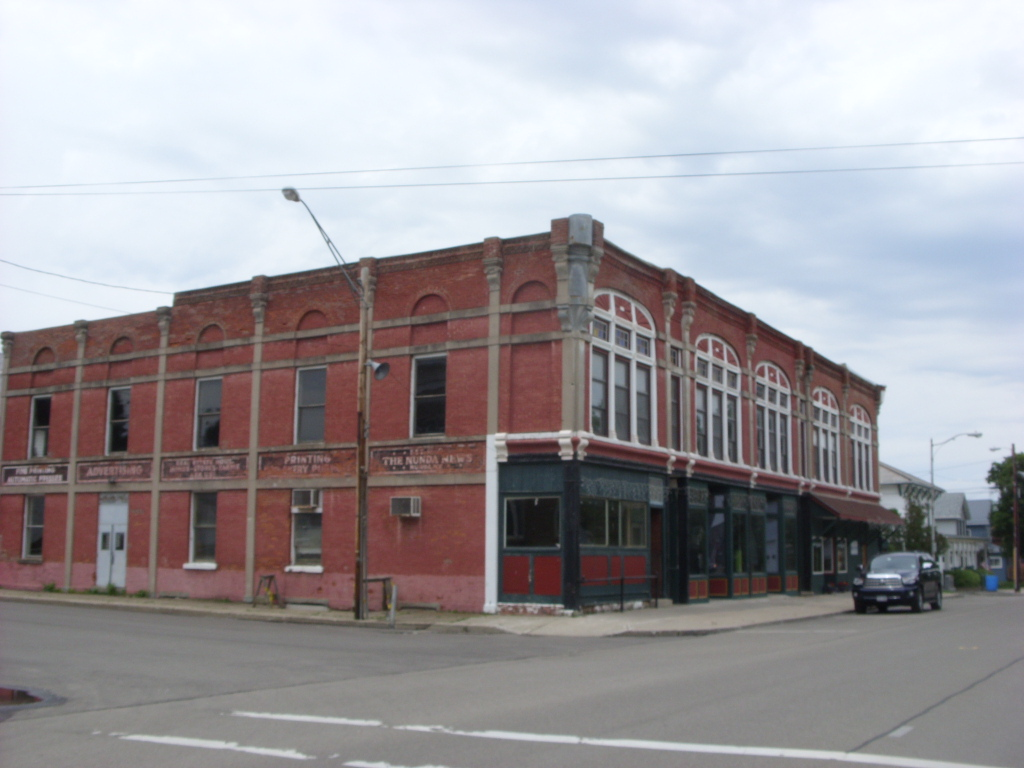
- Union Block, June 2009

- Location within New York Location within the United States
- Location: 38-42 State St., Nunda, New York
- Coordinates: 42°34′52″N 77°56′34″W
- Area: less than one acre
- Architect: Gleason, Henry B.; Cullens, John
- Architectural style: Queen Anne
- NRHP reference No.: 00000092
- Added to NRHP: February 10, 2000

Union Block is a historic commercial building located in the village of Nunda in Livingston County, New York. It is a two-story, 77 by 105 foot, brick and stone structure built in 1882-1883 and designed to draw commerce and investment back to Nunda after a period of economic stagnation. It is in the Eastlake and Queen Anne style.

It was listed on the National Register of Historic Places in 2000.
