= Edgerley (Oakland, New York) =

Historic house in New York, United States

- U.S. National Register of Historic Places
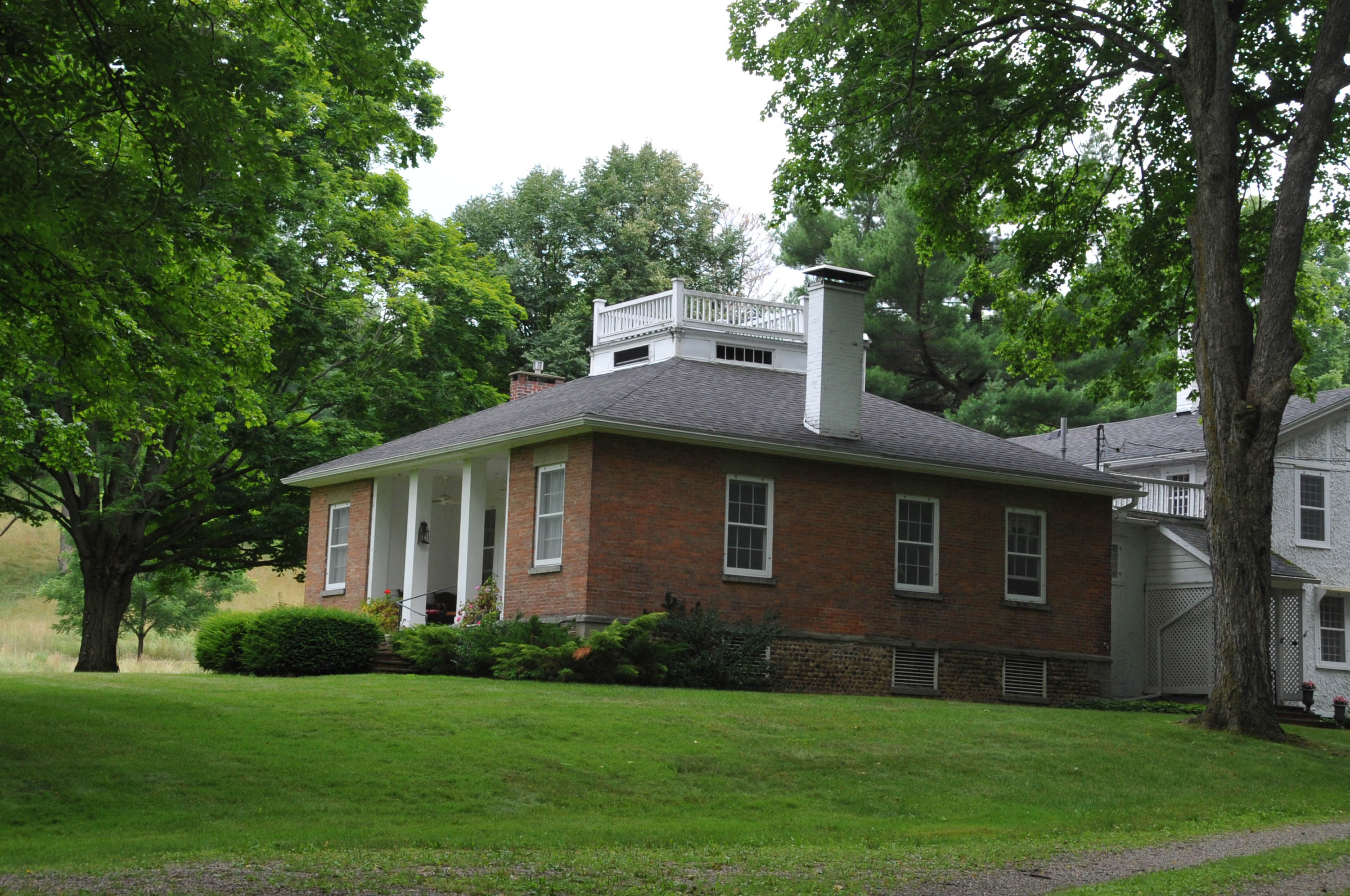

- Location within New York Location within the United States
- Nearest city: Oakland, New York
- Coordinates: 42°34′29″N 77°58′22″W
- Area: 19 acres (7.7 ha)
- Built: 1828
- Architectural style: Early Republic, Greek Revival, Roman Classical
- NRHP reference No.: 80002649
- Added to NRHP: July 16, 1980

Edgerley is a historic home and residential complex located at Oakland in Livingston County, New York. The 1 1/2-story original house was built in 1828 and is a rare example of Tidewater architecture in upstate New York with Roman Classic massing and Greek Revival detailing. Attached to it are a stucco addition from the 1870s and a stucco addition with garage from the 1930s. Also on the property is a guest cottage known as "Box Hill", a barn constructed about 1830, and several smaller outbuildings.

It was listed on the National Register of Historic Places in 1980.
