= Dr. William E. Murphey House =

- U.S. National Register of Historic Places
- Alabama Register of Landmarks and Heritage
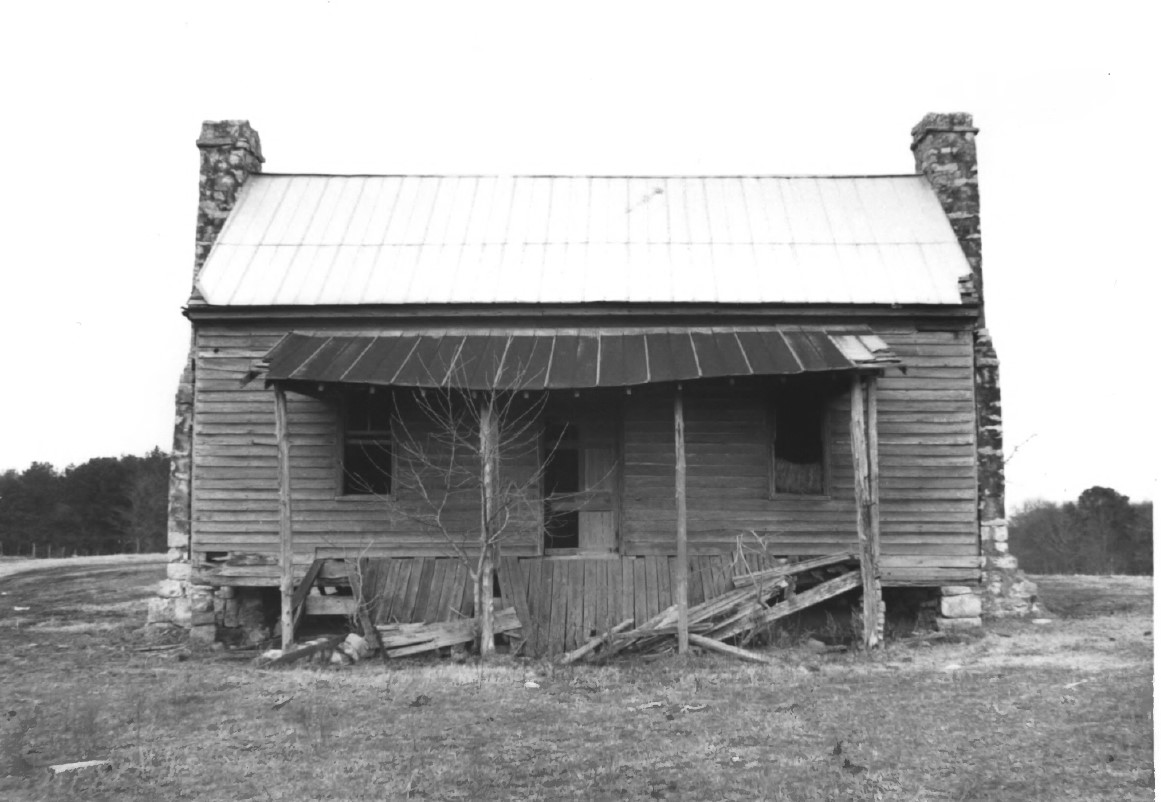
- Dr. William E. Murphey House in 1985

- Location within Alabama Location within the United States
- Nearest city: Trinity, Alabama
- Coordinates: 34°38′38″N 87°5′53″W
- Area: 163 acres (66 ha)
- Built: 1824
- Architectural style: Tidewater Cottage
- MPS: Tidewater Cottages in the Tennessee Valley TR
- NRHP reference No.: 86001547

Significant dates
- Added to NRHP: July 9, 1986
- Designated ARLH: April 16, 1985

The Dr. William E. Murphey House was a historic residence near Trinity, Alabama, United States. The house was built around 1824 by George Murphey, a settler from North Carolina. The house eventually passed to his son, William. It was a Tidewater cottage with a hall and parlor layout, common in Murhpey's native North Carolina but rare in North Alabama. The house was listed on the National Register of Historic Places in 1986. It was destroyed by a tornado on April 27, 2011.
