= Green Pryor Rice House =

Historic house in Alabama, United States

- U.S. National Register of Historic Places
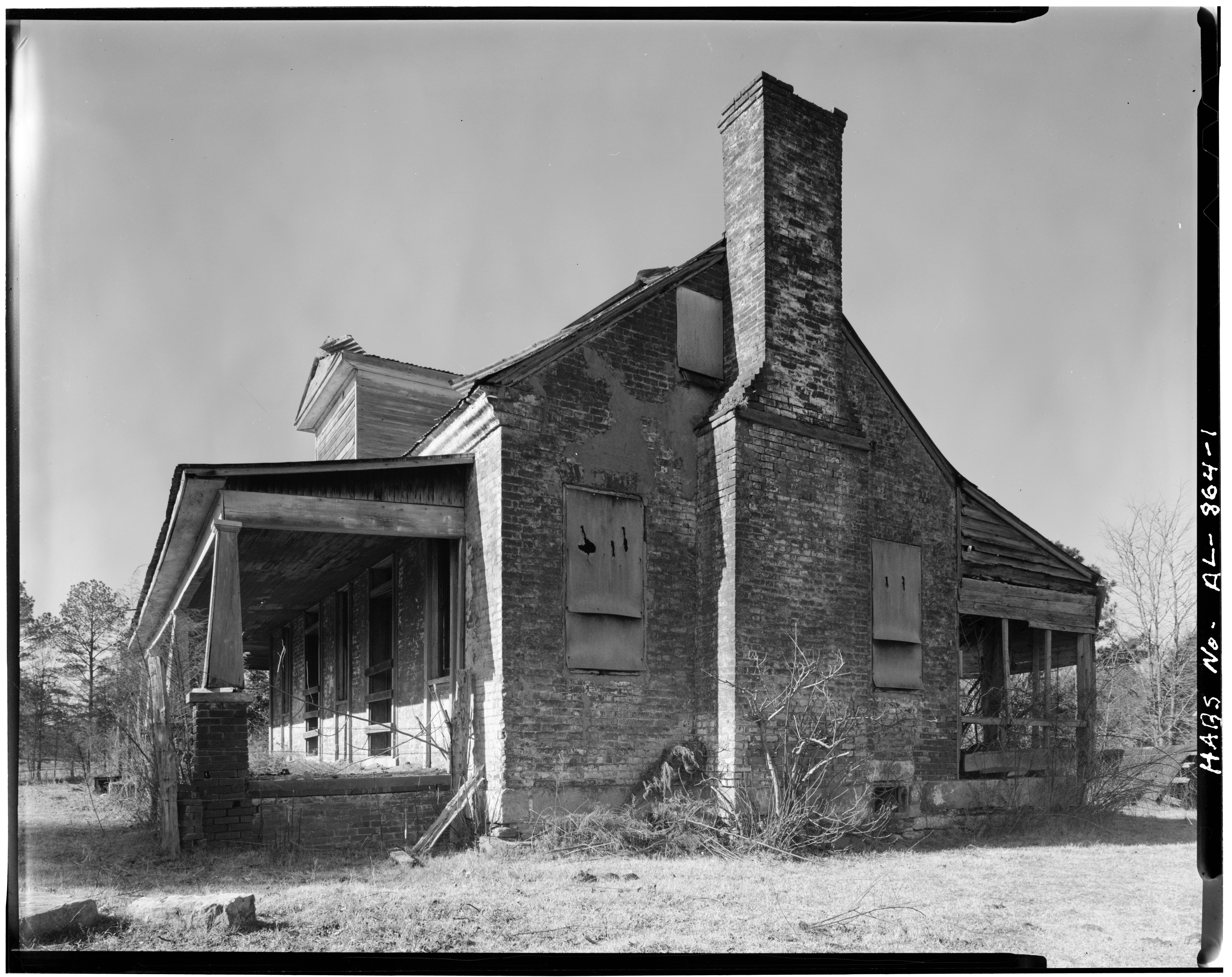
- The house in 1933

- Location within Alabama Location within the United States
- Location: Somerville, Alabama
- Coordinates: 34°28′27″N 86°47′43″W
- Area: 0.8 acres (0.32 ha)
- Built: 1835
- Architectural style: Tidewater Cottage
- MPS: Tidewater Cottages in the Tennessee Valley TR
- NRHP reference No.: 86001546
- Added to NRHP: July 9, 1986

The Green Pryor Rice House (also known as Gilchrist Place) is a historic residence in Somerville, Alabama. The house was built in the early 1830s by Matthew Cyrus Houston, a Virginian who was postmaster of Somerville and clerk of the circuit court. In 1837 the house was acquired by Green Pryor Rice, a judge and state senator. Two of Rice's grandsons who were born in the house also went on to political careers: Samuel D. Weakley was Chief Justice of the Alabama Supreme Court and Malcolm Rice Patterson was Governor of Tennessee. The house is a Tidewater cottage, native to the southern Atlantic coast. The house is constructed of Flemish bond brick, and has two front entries, each with transoms. An unusual feature of the house is the corbelled brick cornice. A bungalow-style porch was added in 1927, but removed in 1984. The house was listed on the National Register of Historic Places in 1986.
