= Princess Theatre (Decatur, Alabama) =

Princess Theatre Center for the Performing Arts
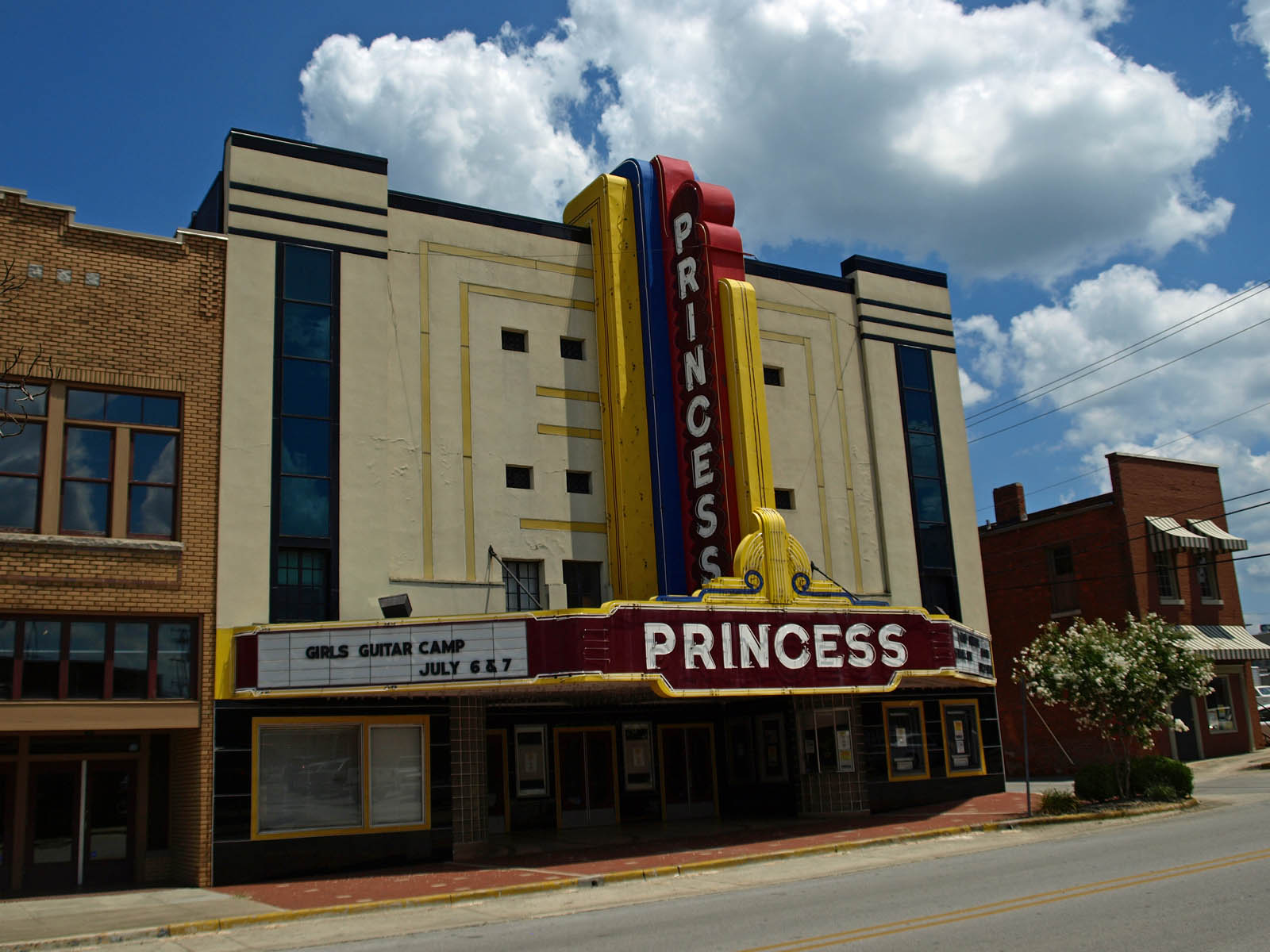
- The Princess Theatre in July 2010
- Interactive map of Princess Theatre Center for the Performing Arts
- Address: 112 Second Avenue NE
- Location: Decatur, Alabama
- Owner: City of Decatur
- Capacity: 677
- Type: Performing arts center

Construction
- Built: 1887
- Opened: December 30, 1919
- Renovated: 1941, 1978

Website
- www.princesstheatre.org
- Princess Theatre
- U.S. National Register of Historic Places
- U.S. Historic district – Contributing property
- Alabama Register of Landmarks and Heritage
- Coordinates: 34°36′16″N 86°59′5″W
- Architect: Albert Frahn (1941 renovation)
- Architectural style: Art Deco
- Part of: New Decatur–Albany Historic District (ID95000810)
- NRHP reference No.: 100012405

Significant dates
- Added to NRHP: December 18, 2025
- Designated: July 7, 1995
- Designated CP: July 7, 1995
- Designated ARLH: October 23, 1981

The Princess Theatre is a 677-seat performing arts venue in Decatur, Alabama. The art deco-style building was originally built in 1887 as a livery stable. In 1919, the building was transformed into a silent film and vaudeville playhouse.

In 1941 the Princess received its art deco redesign. A bright neon marque which displays the name was installed around the same time. Local architect Albert Frahn painted the interior in burgundy and gray, with glow-in-the-dark murals. Outside the doors, the floor is paved with terrazzo in a map of Alabama, that marks the Tennessee River and City of Decatur.

In 1978, the city of Decatur purchased The Princess after it closed as a movie house. The city gave the theatre a $750,000 renovation, and the stage was again open as the premier performing arts venue for the Decatur area. The building was listed on the Alabama Register of Landmarks and Heritage in 1981. The theatre was also added to the National Register of Historic Places as a contributing property of the New Decatur–Albany Historic District in 1995 and given its own separate listing on December 18, 2025.

== The Princess and education ==
Annually, the Princess hosts 60,000 customers, 20,000 of whom are students and teachers. Professional performers regularly visit Decatur to perform during school hours for arts education. The theater also sponsors performers that visit the local Decatur City Schools to teach in the schools.

== Future renovation and restoration efforts ==
The City of Decatur completed renovation in the Sexton Lobby and in the future to restore The Princess to the way it looked during the time period of the 1950s and 1960s. This includes removing paint that covers the murals painted by Albert Frahn. Efforts have created a large reception area adjacent and connected to the main theatre. It includes additional second floor access, concessions, restrooms, dressing rooms, as well as a second entrance to the building was completed in April 2009.

== Gallery ==
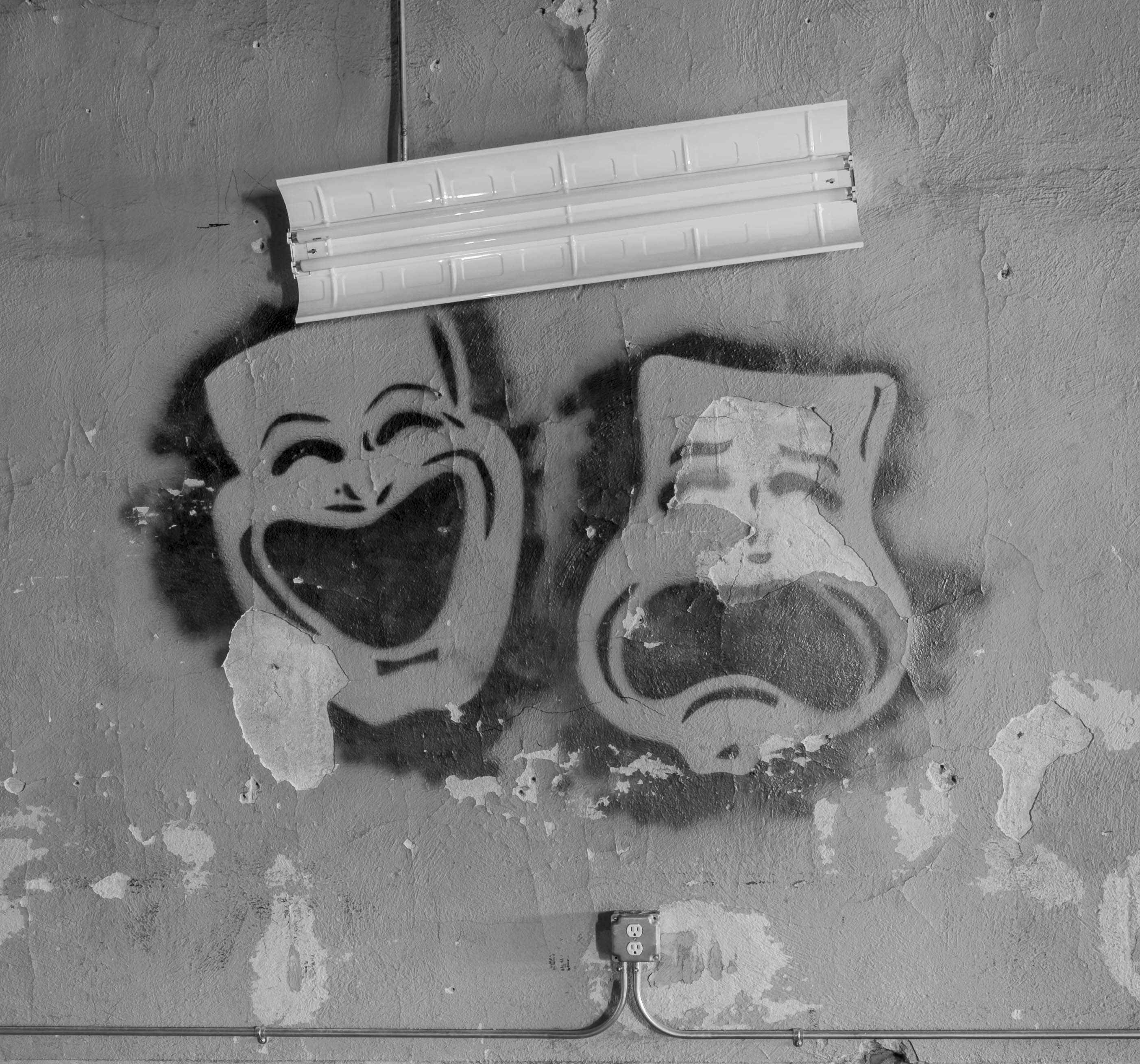
Comedy and tragedy masks from the Princess Theatre, Decatur, AL
