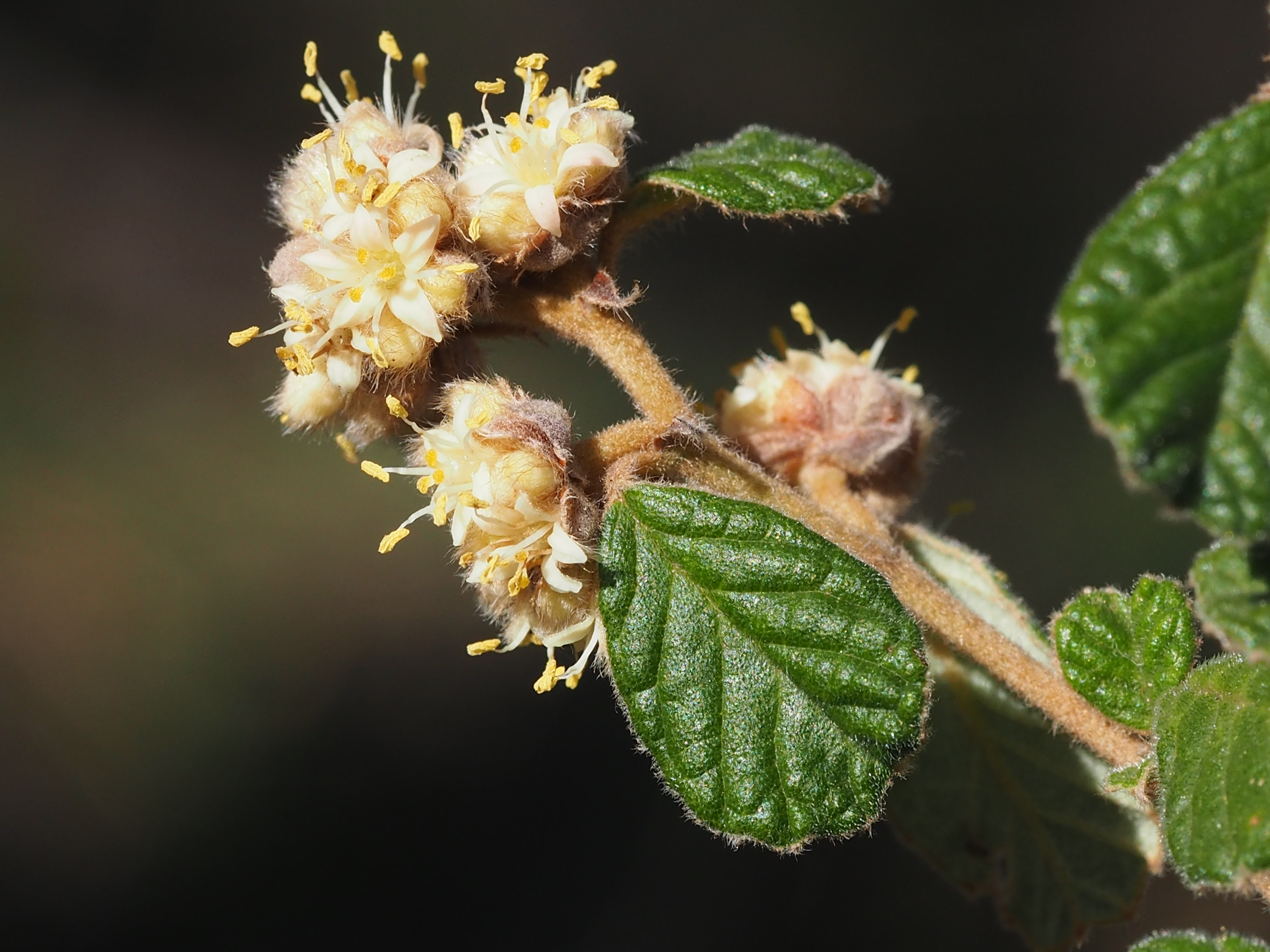

Scientific classification
- Kingdom: Plantae
- Clade: Tracheophytes
- Clade: Angiosperms
- Clade: Eudicots
- Clade: Rosids
- Order: Rosales
- Family: Rhamnaceae
- Genus: Pomaderris
- Species: P. prunifolia

Binomial name
- Pomaderris prunifolia Fenzl

= Pomaderris prunifolia =

Plum-leaf pomaderris

Species of flowering plant

Pomaderris prunifolia, commonly known as plum leaf pomaderris, is a plant in the family Rhamnaceae. It has slightly toothed, wrinkled green leaves, stems with rusty coloured star-shaped hairs and yellow flowers.

== Description ==
Pomaderris prunifolia is a shrub to 4 m (13 ft) high with rusty coloured star-shaped hairs on the stems. The leaves are egg-shaped to oblong to more or less elliptic, 2–4 cm (0.79–1.57 in) long, 8–15 mm (0.31–0.59 in) wide, upper surface wrinkled, rough, with simple hairs or rarely smooth, margins more or less toothed, underside with more or less rusty coloured star-shaped hairs and ending with a broadly acute apex. The yellow flowers are borne in a panicle formation on a short pedicel. The seed capsule has long, rusty hairs and the hypanthium long whitish hairs.

== Taxonomy ==
Pomaderris prunifolia was first formally described in 1837 by Eduard Fenzl and the description was published in Enumeratio plantarum quas in Novae Hollandiae ora austro-occidentali ad fluvium Cygnorum et in sinu Regis Georgii collegit Carolus Liber Baro de Hügel.

== Distribution and habitat ==
Plum-leaf pomaderris is an uncommon species, it grows south of the Hunter Valley, west of the Nandewar Range and Chandler River gorge in rocky situations, mostly near creeks.
