= West Old Town Historic District =

Historic district in Alabama, United States

- U.S. National Register of Historic Places
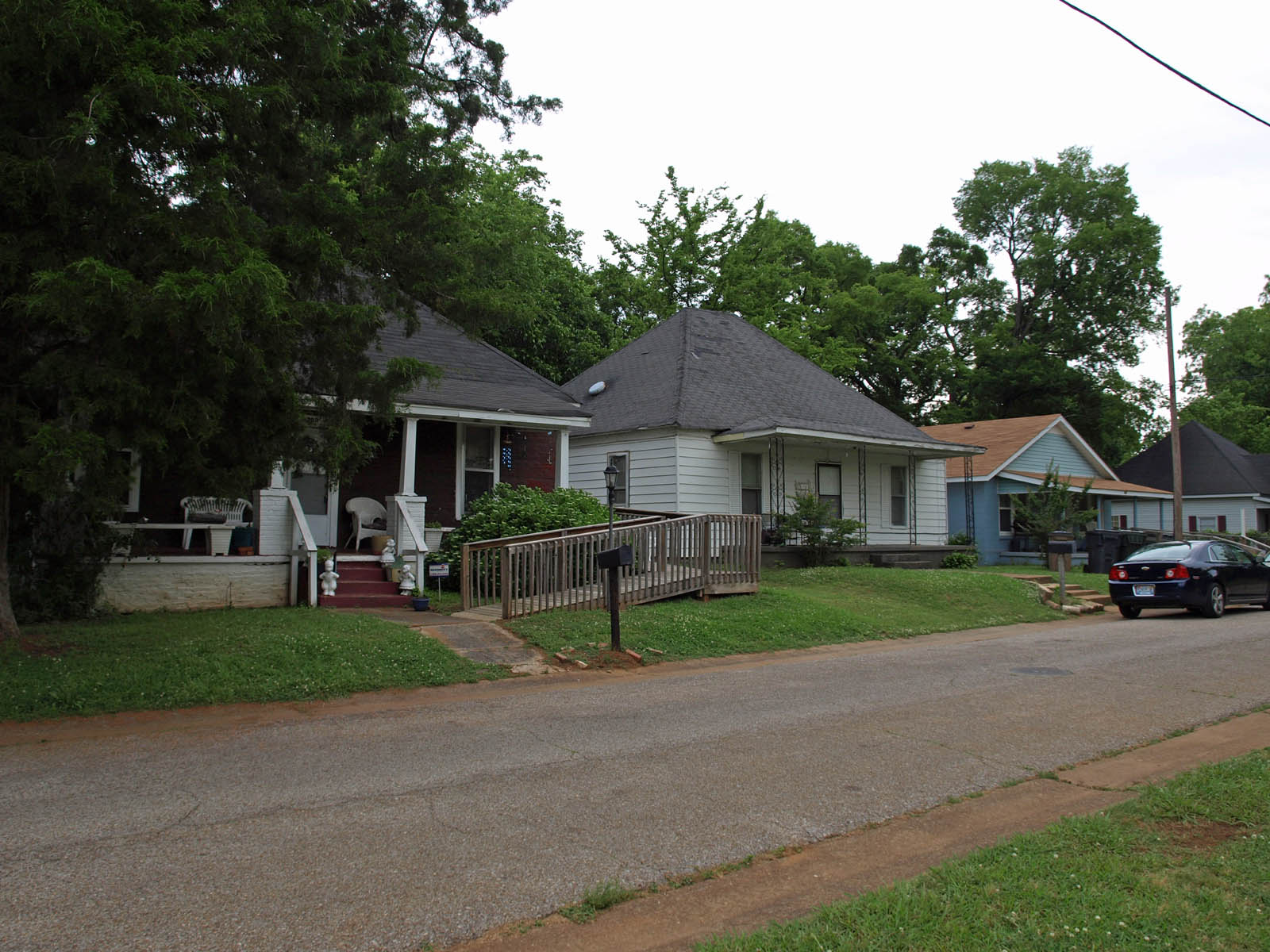

- Location within Alabama
- Nearest city: Decatur, Alabama
- Coordinates: 34.618235°N 86.994038°W
- Area: 31 acres (13 ha)
- Architectural style: Modern Movement, Bungalow/craftsman
- NRHP reference No.: 12001080
- Added to NRHP: December 26, 2012

The West Old Town Historic District, in or near Decatur, Alabama, is a historic district which was listed on the National Register of Historic Places in 2012.

It includes NW Alma Street to NW Vine Street. It included 42 contributing buildings and a contributing site on 31 acres (13 ha).

It includes Modern Movement and Bungalow/craftsman architecture.

== See also ==
- East Old Town Historic District
