= East Old Town Historic District =

Historic district in Alabama, United States

- U.S. National Register of Historic Places
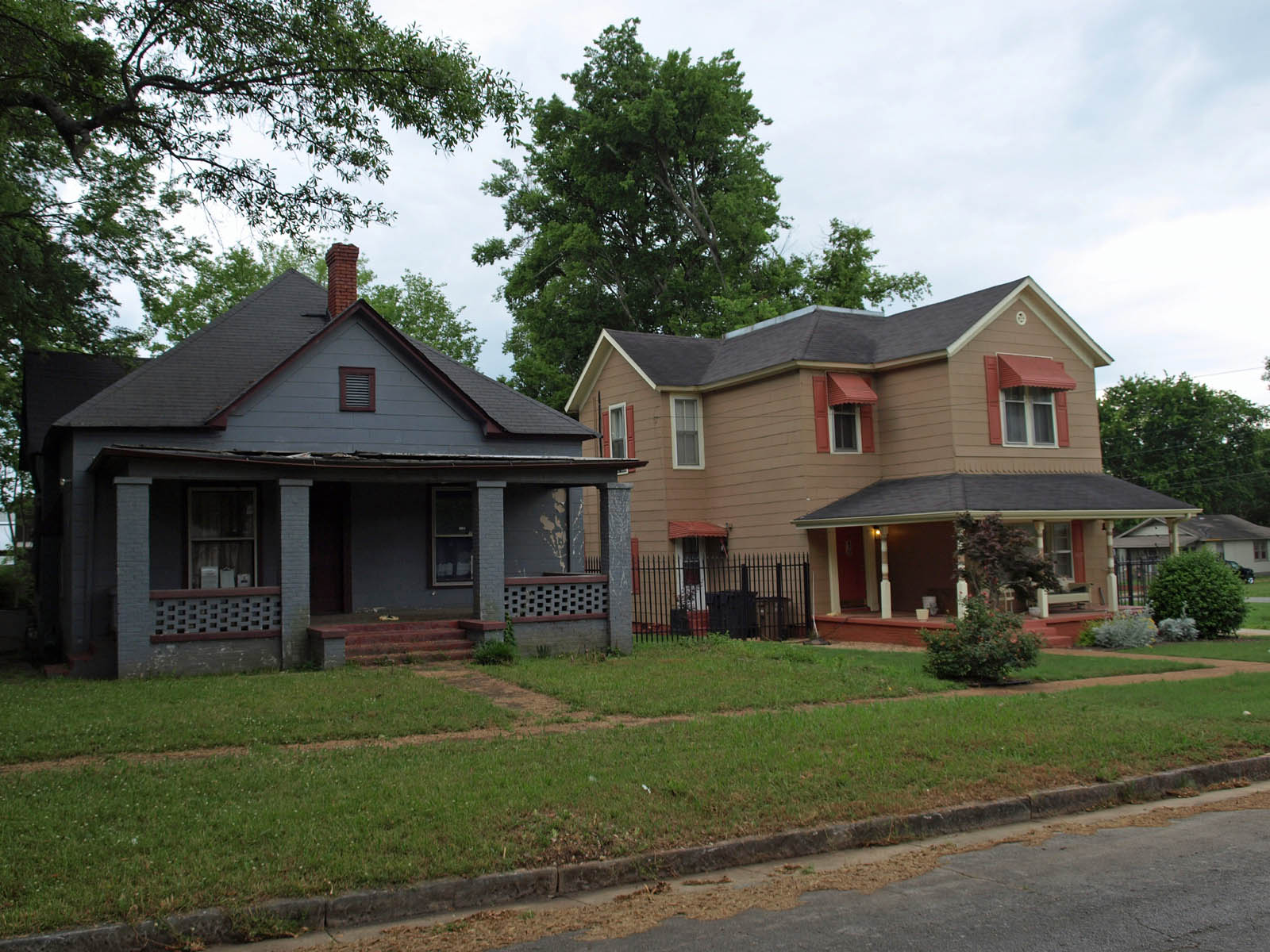

- Location within Alabama
- Nearest city: Decatur, Alabama
- Coordinates: 34.61638°N 86.986849°W
- Area: 30 acres (12 ha)
- Architectural style: Greek Revival, Bungalow/craftsman
- NRHP reference No.: 12001079
- Added to NRHP: December 26, 2012

The East Old Town Historic District, located near Decatur, Alabama, is a historic district which was listed on the National Register of Historic Places in 2012.

The listing included 37 contributing buildings and one contributing site on 30 acres (12 ha).

It includes Greek Revival, and Bungalow/craftsman architecture.

The district spans from NW Church Street to NW Wilson Street.

== See also ==
- West Old Town Historic District
