= Somerville Courthouse =

- U.S. National Register of Historic Places
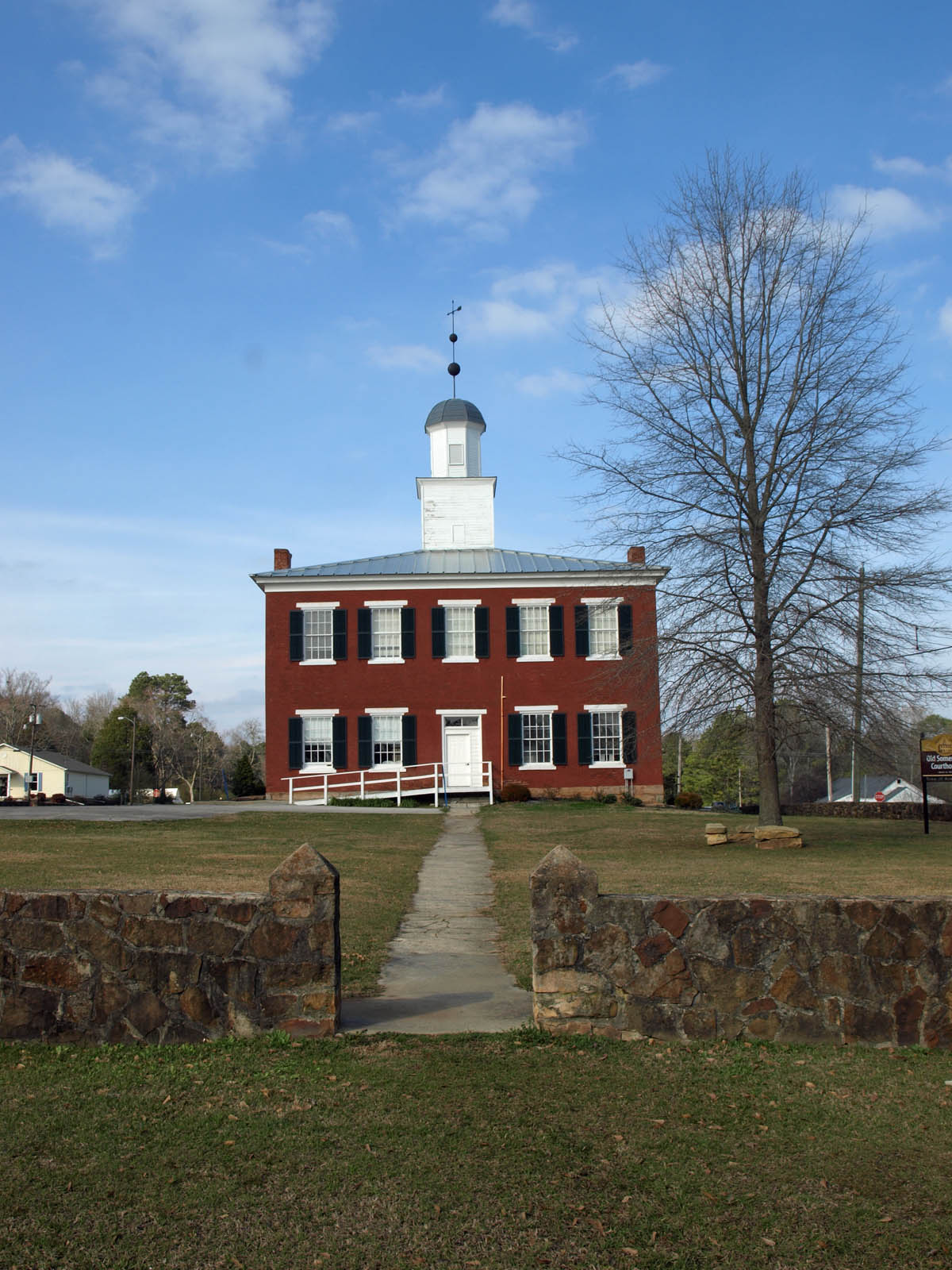
- The courthouse in February 2012

- Location within Alabama Location within the United States
- Location: SR 36, Somerville, Alabama
- Coordinates: 34°28′22″N 86°47′54″W
- Area: 0.8 acres (0.32 ha)
- Built: 1837
- Architectural style: Federal
- NRHP reference No.: 72000177
- Added to NRHP: March 24, 1972

The Somerville Courthouse is a historic building in Somerville, Alabama.

== History ==
Constructed in 1837, this building is oldest extant courthouse in Alabama and served as the second courthouse for Morgan County. The construction was funded by a tax levied by the state government. It was used by the county government until 1891, when the county seat was moved to the larger Decatur. The building was later used as a school and town hall.

== Physical Description ==
The courthouse is two stories and constructed of brick, with large, eight-over-eight sash windows on each façade and the sides. The hipped roof is topped with an octagonal cupola with a wooden base and topped with a finial. Two interior chimneys pierce the roof on each side. There are four offices on the first floor and the second floor holds the courtroom with smaller holding rooms for witnesses. The courthouse was listed on the National Register of Historic Places in 1972.
