= Kate Edgerley =

New Zealand botanist and teacher

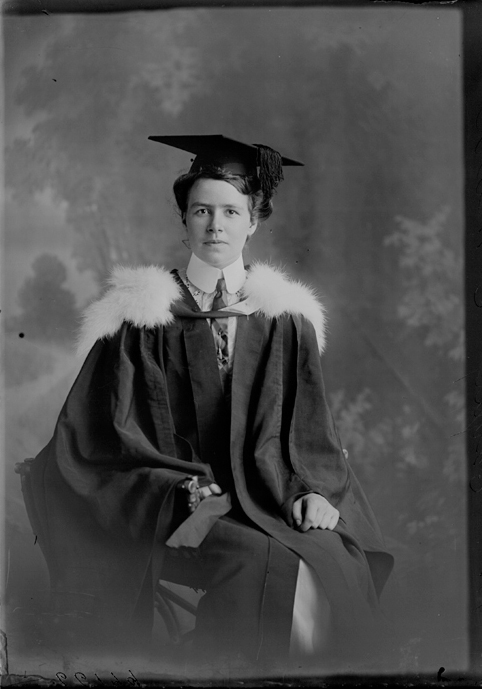
Kate Edgerley in 1911

Kate Violet Edgerley (21 February 1887 – 26 February 1939) was a New Zealand botanist and teacher. She studied botany under Algernon Thomas at Auckland University College, and published a paper on the reproductive organs of Lycopodium. Edgerley taught at Auckland Girls' Grammar School from 1912 until 1939. She was the first woman President of the New Zealand Secondary Schools Assistants’ Association.

== Life ==
Born in Auckland in 1887, Kate was the granddaughter of John Edgerley, one of New Zealand's first botanists. Having won first prize for science at Auckland Grammar School, Kate continued to study. In 1911, she received a Masters with first class Honours in botany from Auckland University College, supervised by Algernon Thomas. Her thesis was on the reproductive organs of Lycopodium, and was published in the Transactions of the Royal Society of New Zealand in 1914.

Edgerley taught at Auckland Girls' Grammar School from 1912 until her sudden death in 1939. She was the first President of the Botany Club, which superseded the Rambling Club in 1919. In 1935, Edgerley was elected the first woman President of the New Zealand Secondary Schools Assistants’ Association.

Staff and students of the school presented to the school the two volumes of T.F. Cheeseman’s Illustrations of the New Zealand Flora (1914) as a memorial to Edgerley. At the school prize giving, the Kate Edgerley Memorial Prize was awarded first for botany and then later for natural sciences.

In 2017, Edgerley was selected as one of the Royal Society Te Apārangi's "150 women in 150 words", celebrating the contributions of women to knowledge in New Zealand.

== Publications ==
"The prothallia of three New Zealand lycopods" Transactions of the Royal Society of New Zealand 47:94–111 (1914)
