= Clara Power Edgerly =

American elocutionist

Clara Power Edgerly (1864 – December 25, 1896) was a prominent American elocutionist and principal of the Boston College of Oratory and Delsarte Ideal Training School, informally known as the Boston College of Oratory.

== Career ==
Edgerly, a former teacher of pantomime at the rival Boston School of Oratory, founded the Boston College of Oratory and Delsarte Ideal Training School in 1892. Boston was a center of elocutionary training at the time, and Edgerly was the only woman to head any of the city's oratory schools. Its facilities were on Boylston Street.

Edgerly was especially interested in the Delsarte method of dramatic expression and in "statue posing" for tableaux vivants, and the school's curriculum included training in these as well as physical and vocal training. Her advanced students formed the Edgerly Tableaux Troupe and gave public exhibitions. Courses of study were two to three years in length. The Boston College of Oratory was incorporated into the rival School of Expression in 1895.

Edgerly was also interested in dress reform.

Edgerly died at her home in Manchester, New Hampshire, on December 25, 1896, attributed to blood poisoning. She was survived by her husband, Julien Campbell Edgerly.
