= Hartselle Downtown Commercial Historic District =

Historic district in Alabama, United States

- U.S. National Register of Historic Places
- U.S. Historic district
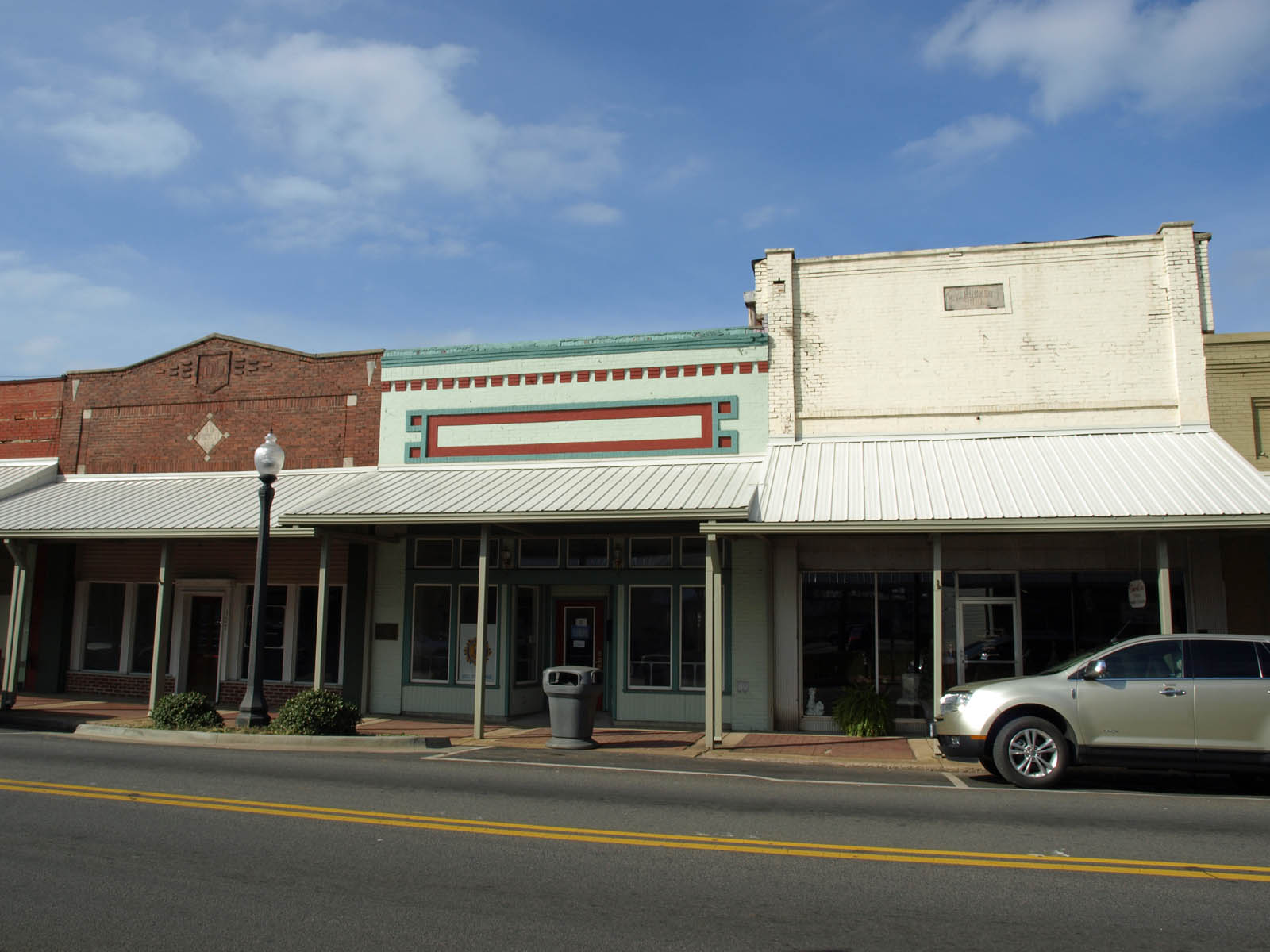
- Buildings on Main Street in February 2012

- Location within Alabama Location within the United States
- Location: Roughly along Main, Railroad, Hickory, and Sparkman Sts., Hartselle, Alabama
- Coordinates: 34°26′36″N 86°56′3″W
- NRHP reference No.: 99000469
- Added to NRHP: April 22, 1999

The Hartselle Downtown Commercial Historic District is a historic district in Hartselle, Alabama. The town was founded in 1870 when the Louisville and Nashville Railroad was extended south to Birmingham and Mobile. Hartselle quickly grew into a transportation hub for shipping timber and cotton. The town was devastated by two fires, in 1901 which destroyed all commercial buildings east of the railroad tracks, and in 1916 where twenty-one buildings including the passenger and freight depots were destroyed. Only nine buildings (all brick) survived the 1916 fire. After an initial building boom from 1916 through 1920, development slowed due to low farming prices after World War I and the Great Depression. Notable structures in the district are the hip roofed L&N passenger depot and two-story freight depot and the Colonial Revival post office (built 1939). Of the commercial buildings, 51 are one story, 14 are two stories, and 1 is three stories. The district was listed on the National Register of Historic Places in 1999.
