= Forest Home (Trinity, Alabama) =

Historic house in Alabama, United States

- U.S. National Register of Historic Places
- Alabama Register of Landmarks and Heritage
- Location within Alabama Location within the United States
- Nearest city: Trinity, Alabama
- Coordinates: 34°36′36″N 87°3′58″W
- Built: 1856
- NRHP reference No.: 80000733

Significant dates
- Added to NRHP: November 21, 1980
- Designated ARLH: October 19, 1979

The Forest Home (also known as the Absalom L. Davis House) is a historic residence near Trinity, Alabama. The house was built in 1856 on land given to him upon his father-in-law's death. Davis was a farmer, a teacher at LaGrange College (today known as the University of North Alabama), and a leader of the Grange movement of farmer advocacy. The house remained in the Davis family as a working cotton farm until 1973. The house is a two-story I-house with a single-story rear ell. A two-story porch adorns the front façade. The house was listed on the Alabama Register of Landmarks and Heritage in 1979 and the National Register of Historic Places in 1980.
