= L. E. Walker =

Lewis E. Walker (May 15, 1826–1916) was a teacher, bookstore proprietor, and photographer who captured stereoscopic images of Upstate New York. He was born in Greenwich, Massachusetts or Warsaw, New York. He owned a bookstore in Warsaw, New York. He is commemorated by a historical marker there. His father William Walker was a pioneer in the area.

He had a son and daughter. In December 1853 he married Susan Ann Bowers.

He took a series of "Chataqua Photographs".
