= G.A.R. Memorial Hall (Hunt, New York) =

- U.S. National Register of Historic Places
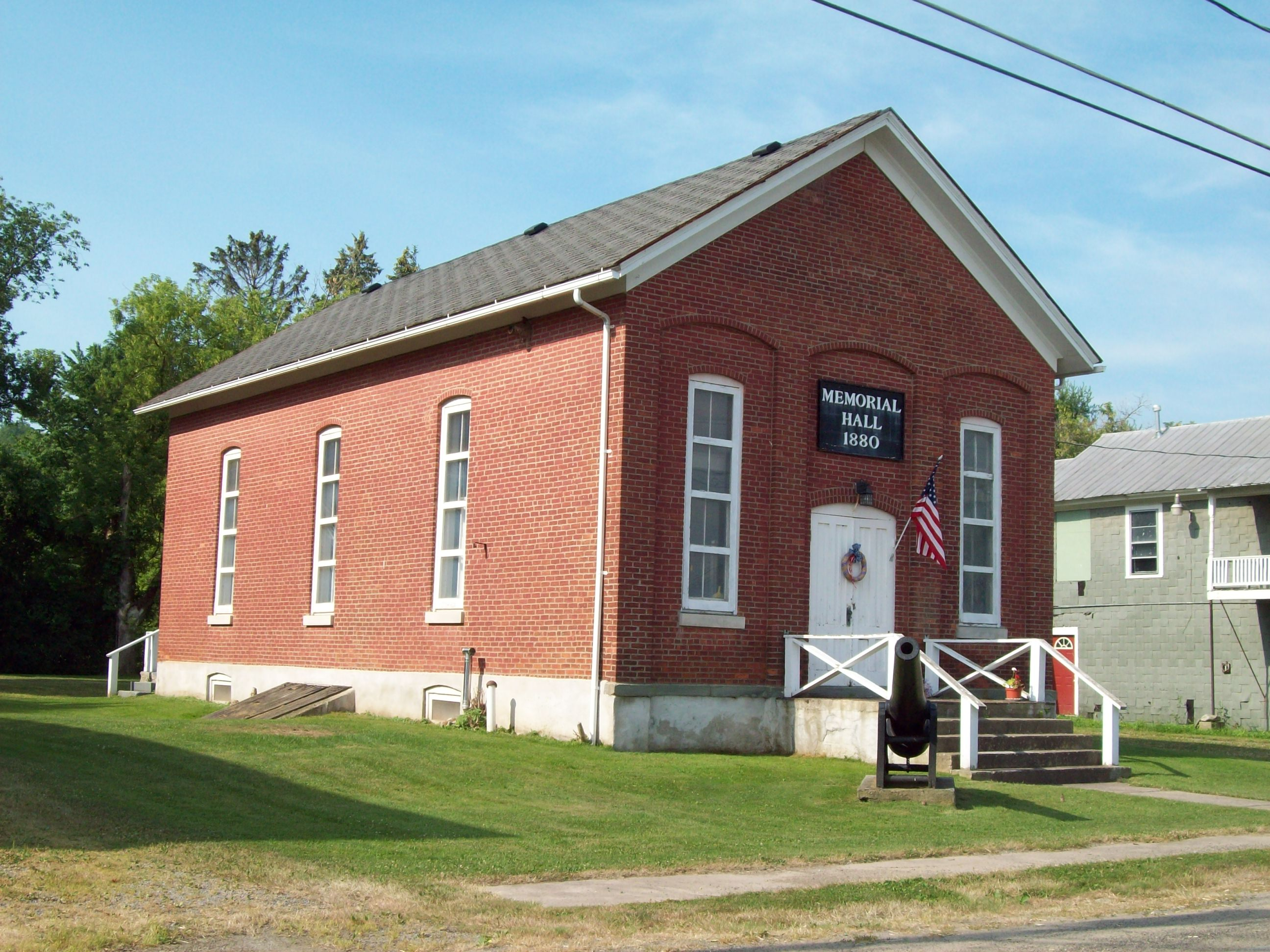
- G.A.R. Memorial Hall, July 2011

- Location within New York Location within the United States
- Location: Main St., Hunt, New York
- Coordinates: 42°32′48″N 77°59′33″W
- Area: 0.3 acres (0.12 ha)
- Built: 1880
- Architectural style: Italianate
- NRHP reference No.: 06000888
- Added to NRHP: September 28, 2006

G.A.R. Memorial Hall is a historic multi-purpose community hall located at Hunt in Livingston County, New York. It was built about 1880 as home to the local chapter of the Grand Army of the Republic. It is a 1-story, three-by-three-bay brick structure with a gable roof.

It was listed on the National Register of Historic Places in 2006.
