= Nunda (village), New York =

Nunda, New York
- Village
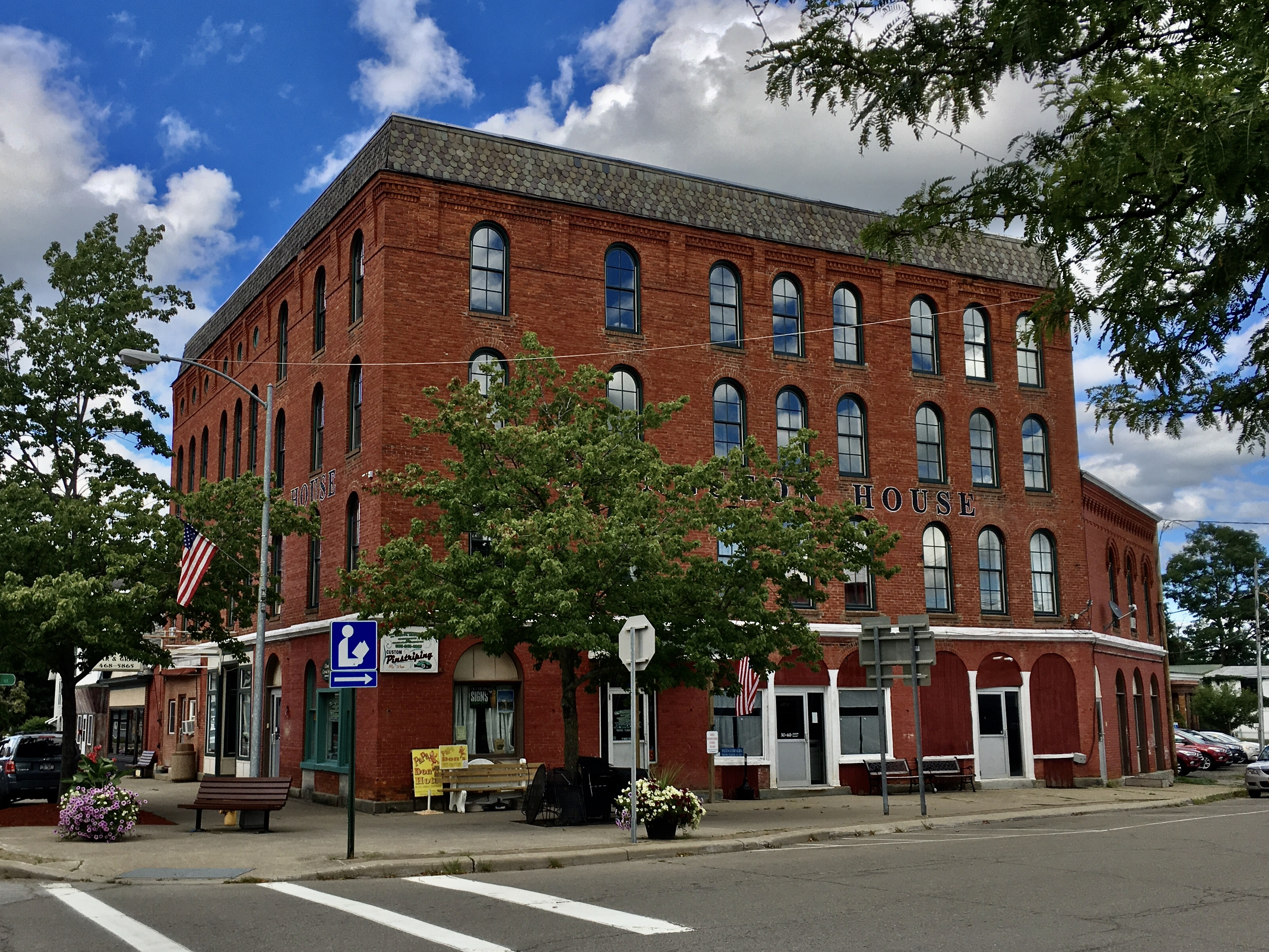
- Nunda in 2020

- Location within New York Location within the United States
- Coordinates: 42°34′50″N 77°56′18″W
- Country: United States
- State: New York
- County: Livingston
- Town: Nunda

Area
  - Total: 0.98 sq mi (2.53 km^{2})
  - Land: 0.98 sq mi (2.53 km^{2})
  - Water: 0 sq mi (0.00 km^{2})
- Elevation: 942 ft (287 m)

Population (2020)
  - Total: 1,169
  - Density: 1,197.4/sq mi (462.31/km^{2})
- Time zone: UTC-5 (Eastern (EST))
  - Summer (DST): UTC-4 (EDT)
- ZIP code: 14517
- Area code: 585
- FIPS code: 36-54078
- GNIS feature ID: 0959068
- Website: www.villageofnunda.org

Nunda /nʌnˈdeɪ/ is a village in the town of Nunda, Livingston County, New York, United States. The population of the village was 1,377 at the 2010 census, out of 3,064 in the entire town.

== History ==
The village was incorporated in 1839 as "Nunda Valley". A large fire destroyed part of the village in 1852. In 1853, an attempt was made to found a new county with Nunda village as the county seat. This attempt failed.

The Union Block was added to the National Register of Historic Places in 1981.

== Notable people ==
-Commander William Howard Donovan Jr, who died in the 9/11 Pentagon Attack

== Geography ==
The village is located in southwestern Livingston County at 42°34′50″N 77°56′18″W (42.580628, -77.938392), in the western part of the town of Nunda. The village is at the junction of New York State Routes 408 and 436. It is 11 miles (18 km) southwest of Mount Morris and 14 miles (23 km) west of Dansville. It is 17 miles (27 km) southwest of Geneseo, the Livingston county seat.

According to the United States Census Bureau, the village of Nunda has a total area of 1.0 square mile (2.5 km^{2}), all land. Keshequa Creek and Crooked Creek flow through the village. Keshequa Creek flows northeast to Canaseraga Creek near Sonyea and is part of the Genesee River watershed. Due to heavy rains and a rupture in the village water reservoir, there was a flood which ruined the brand new Keshequa Central School Middle School Gymnasium that had been completed one month before the flooding occurred.

== Demographics ==
Historical population
Census	Pop.	Note	%±
1870	1,189		—
1880	1,037		−12.8%
1890	1,010		−2.6%
1900	1,018		0.8%
1910	1,043		2.5%
1920	1,152		10.5%
1930	1,085		−5.8%
1940	1,077		−0.7%
1950	1,224		13.6%
1960	1,224		0.0%
1970	1,254		2.5%
1980	1,169		−6.8%
1990	1,347		15.2%
2000	1,330		−1.3%
2010	1,377		3.5%
2020	1,169		−15.1%
U.S. Decennial Census

As of the census of 2000, there were 1,330 people, 505 households, and 360 families residing in the village. The population density was 1,349.9 inhabitants per square mile (521.2/km^{2}). There were 547 housing units at an average density of 555.2 per square mile (214.4/km^{2}). The racial makeup of the village was 97.59% White, 0.38% Black or African American, 0.15% Native American, 0.30% Asian, 0.08% Pacific Islander, 0.60% from other races, and 0.90% from two or more races. Hispanic or Latino of any race were 1.20% of the population.

There were 505 households, out of which 40.0% had children under the age of 18 living with them, 48.9% were married couples living together, 18.8% had a female householder with no husband present, and 28.7% were non-families. 25.0% of all households were made up of individuals, and 10.3% had someone living alone who was 65 years of age or older. The average household size was 2.54 and the average family size was 3.02.

In the village, the population was spread out, with 29.4% under the age of 18, 7.1% from 18 to 24, 29.8% from 25 to 44, 20.1% from 45 to 64, and 13.6% who were 65 years of age or older. The median age was 36 years. For every 100 females, there were 90.8 males. For every 100 females age 18 and over, there were 83.0 males.

The median income for a household in the village was $39,125, and the median income for a family was $47,368. Males had a median income of $32,404 versus $26,250 for females. The per capita income for the village was $18,960. 12.7% of the population and 10.4% of families were below the poverty line. Out of the total population, 20.3% of those under the age of 18 and 5.6% of those 65 and older were living below the poverty line.
