= Rhea–McEntire House =

Historic house in Alabama, United States

- U.S. National Register of Historic Places
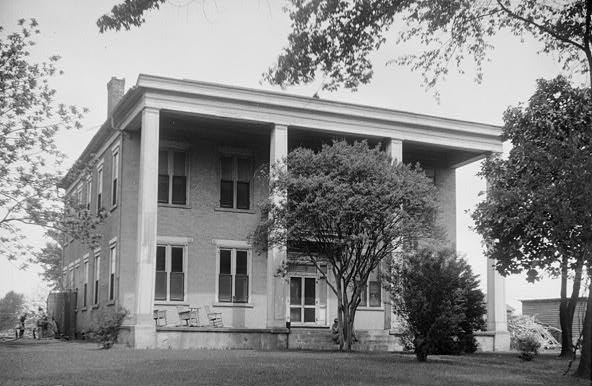
- Rhea–McEntire House in 1934

- Location within Alabama Location within the United States
- Location: 1105 Sycamore St., Decatur, Alabama
- Coordinates: 34°37′2″N 86°59′5″W
- Built: 1836
- Architectural style: Antebellum Greek Revival
- NRHP reference No.: 84000715
- Added to NRHP: August 30, 1984

The Rhea–McEntire House, also known as the Rhea–Burleson–McEntire House, is a historic antebellum Greek Revival mansion located along the shoreline of the Tennessee River's Wheeler Lake in Decatur, Alabama.

The house was constructed prior to 1836, and was used as headquarters by both Union and Confederate forces, alternately, during the Civil War.

Contrary to local legend, the Battle of Shiloh was not planned in this house nor used as headquarters by Albert Sidney Johnston in early 1862. Johnston's headquarters were located in a small building attached to the McCartney Hotel across the railroad tracks from the Burleson mansion. Extant primary-source records back up this assertion.

The official records, most of which are now housed at Tulane University, indicate that General Johnston's headquarters during the time he reorganized his Confederate forces in Decatur in March 1862 were at the McCarty (sic) Hotel. They also indicate that planning for attacking Grant's forces at Pittsburg Landing (the Battle of Shiloh) was done by Johnston's subordinate, General Beauregard, in Corinth, Mississippi.

The list of major buildings in Decatur, Alabama that survived the Civil War were the Dancy-Polk House, the Old State Bank, The McCartney Hotel (demolished in the 1920s), and the Burleson House that later became known as the McEntire House. The most likely reason they were spared is that they were all inside the perimeter of the breastworks built by the Union in 1864. Everything outside the breastworks for an 800-yard (730 m) radius was leveled to provide a clear field of fire for the artillery defending the Union position on the banks of the Tennessee River. The Burlesons owned the house during the Civil War. Dr. Aaron Adair Burleson served as the president of the Tennessee and Central Alabama Railroad that later became part of the Nashville and Decatur Railroad. During the Civil War Dr. Burleson was a physician in the Confederate Army. The home was sold to Jerome Hinds, a former Union soldier from Illinois, in 1869. After the Hinds, the home was used as a boarding house and hotel before standing empty for a period. It was purchased on April 5, 1895 by R. P. McEntire.

The house was also used as the second temporary courthouse, during the construction of the first permanent courthouse in Decatur, in Morgan County.

The house was documented with large-format photographs by the Historic American Buildings Survey in 1937.

== See also ==
- National Register of Historic Places listings in Morgan County, Alabama
- Battle of Decatur
