= Bank Street–Old Decatur Historic District =

Historic district in Alabama, United States

- U.S. National Register of Historic Places
- U.S. Historic district
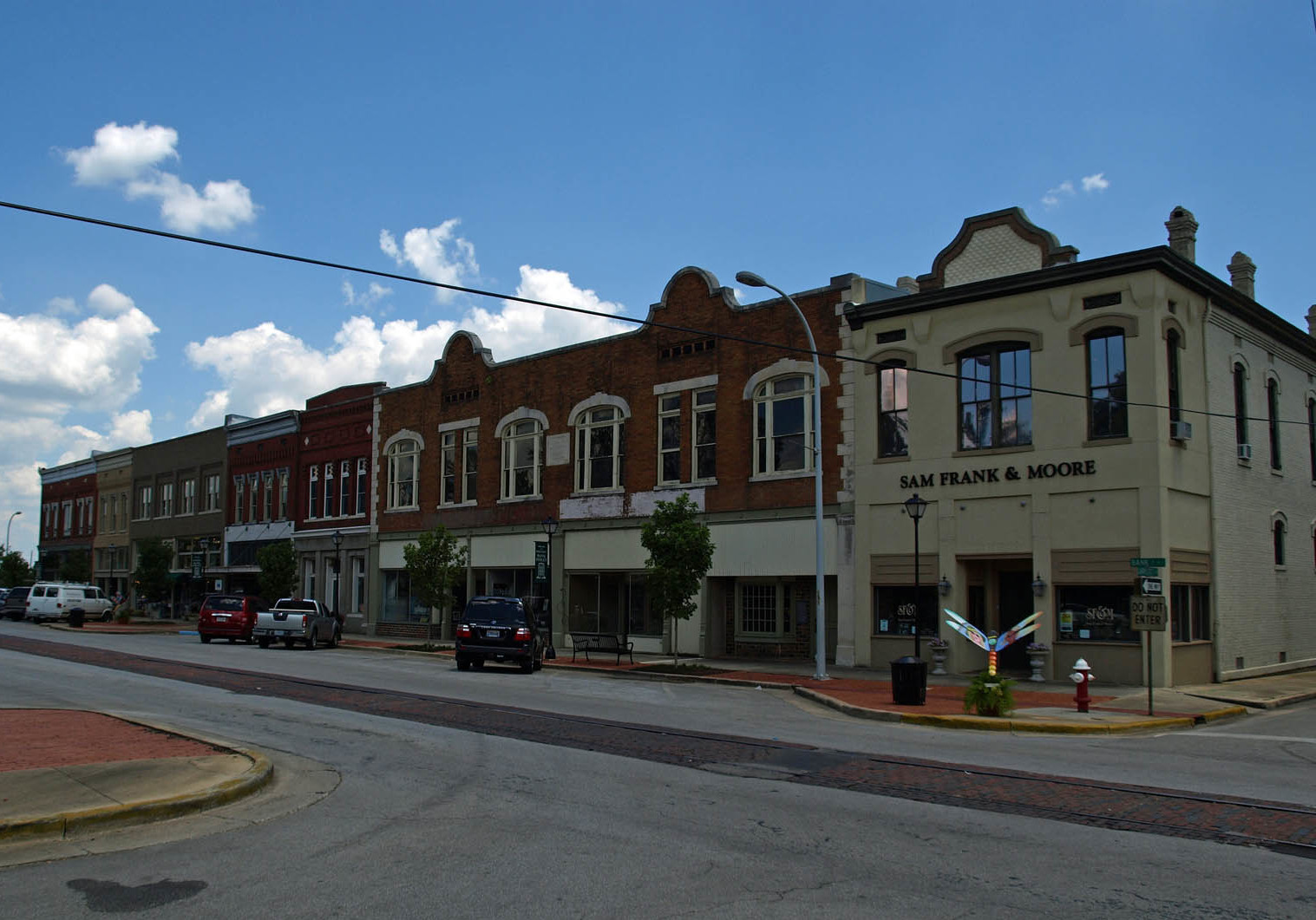
- Buildings on Bank Street in July 2010

- Location within Alabama Location within the United States
- Location: Roughly bounded by Bank, Market, Well and Lee Sts., Decatur, Alabama
- Coordinates: 34°36′36″N 86°59′6″W
- Area: 116.9 acres (47.3 ha)
- Architectural style: Late Victorian, Italianate, Commercial Style, Late 19th And 20th Century Revivals, Bungalow/Craftsman
- NRHP reference No.: 80000731 (original); 85001067 (increase)

Significant dates
- Added to NRHP: March 27, 1980
- Boundary increase: May 16, 1985

The Bank Street–Old Decatur Historic District is a historic district in Decatur, Alabama. The district encompasses the original commercial and residential portion of Decatur along the Tennessee River. In 1832, Decatur was selected over the larger Huntsville as the site of the northern branch of the state bank. Bank Street became the commercial hub of the town, as it was the only place in the Tennessee Valley were riverboat, wagon, and rail transportation converged. Due to its strategic location, the town suffered heavy damage in the Civil War; the Todd House on Lafayette Street is one of only four buildings in Decatur to survive the war (the others being the Old State Bank, the Rhea-McEntire House, and the Dancy-Polk House, all outside the district). As the town was rebuilding from the war, a fire in 1877 destroyed most of the buildings along Bank Street. The rebuilt structures were all of brick, and represent Italianate, Victorian, and Commercial styles popular from the late 19th to the early 20th centuries. Houses in the district are primarily modest, and styles include vernacular Victorian, Shingle-style, and Craftsman bungalows.

The portion along Bank Street was listed on the National Register of Historic Places in 1980, while the remainder, including all of the residential portion, was added to the district in 1985.
