= List of crossings of the Genesee River =

This is a list of bridges and other crossings of the Genesee River in order from its source in Ulysses, Pennsylvania downstream to Lake Ontario.

== Crossings list ==
| Crossing | Opened | Carries | Location | Coordinates |
=== Pennsylvania ===
| Loucks Mills Road culvert | | Loucks Mills Rd. | Ulysses Township | 41°53′34″N 77°44′44″W |
| Driveway culvert | | Private driveway | Ulysses | 41°53′39″N 77°45′25″W |
| South Street culvert | | South St. | Ulysses | 41°53′41″N 77°45′30″W |
| Center Street culvert | | Center St. | Ulysses | 41°53′57″N 77°45′39″W |
| South Main Street culvert | | S. Main St. | Ulysses | 41°54′0″N 77°45′44″W |
| South Water Street culvert | | S. Water St. | Ulysses | 41°54′2″N 77°45′48″W |
| Gravel culvert | | Gravel path | Ulysses | 41°54′5″N 77°45′52″W |
| Church Street culvert | | Church St. | Ulysses | 41°54′6″N 77°45′52″W |
| North Street sidewalk bridge | | Sidewalk | Ulysses | 41°54′14″N 77°45′57″W |
| North Street culvert | | PA 49 (North Street) | Ulysses | 41°54′14.4″N 77°45′57″W |
| Farm culvert | | Private farm road | Ulysses | 41°54′20″N 77°46′4″W |
| Access road culvert | | Treatment plant access road | Ulysses | 41°54′31″N 77°46′24″W |
| Farm bridge | | Private farm road | Bingham Township | 41°55′2″N 77°46′36″W |
| Hickox–Ulysses Road bridge (fourth) | 1941 | Hickox–Ulysses Rd. | Bingham Township | 41°55′17″N 77°46′46″W |
| Hickox–Ulysses Road bridge (third) | 1991 | Hickox–Ulysses Rd. | Bingham Township | 41°55′29″N 77°47′15″W |
| Musto Hollow bridge | 2000 | Musto Hollow Rd. | Bingham Township | 41°56′15″N 77°48′16″W |
| Hickox–Ulysses Road bridge (second) | 1991 | Hickox–Ulysses Rd. | Bingham Township | 41°56′24″N 77°48′41″W |
| Hickox–Ulysses Road bridge (first) | 1998 | Hickox–Ulysses Rd. | Bingham Township | 41°56′42″N 77°49′6″W |
| Farm bridge | | Private farm road | Bingham Township | 41°57′6″N 77°49′31″W |
| Hickox bridge | 1953 | Hickox Rd. | Genesee Township | 41°58′33″N 77°51′24″W |
| Wellsville, Addison and Galeton Railroad bridge | | Disused; Former Wellsville, Addison and Galeton Railroad | Genesee Township | 41°59′3″N 77°51′47″W |
| School Street Bridge | 2011 | Pennsylvania Route 244 (School St.) | Genesee Township | 41°59′20″N 77°52′5″W |
| Commercial Street bridge | 1938/1998 | Commercial St. Former Route 244 detour | Genesee Township | 41°59′40″N 77°52′12″W |
=== New York ===
| Route 19 bridge | 1990 | NY 19 (Stannards Road) | Willing | 42°0′55″N 77°53′41″W |
| Wellsville, Addison and Galeton Railroad bridge | | Disused; Former Wellsville, Addison and Galeton Railroad | Willing | 42°1′6″N 77°54′7″W |
| Graves Road bridge | 1975 | Graves Rd. | Willing | 42°1′29″N 77°54′19″W |
| Stone Dam Road bridge | 2002 | Stone Dam Rd. | Willing | 42°2′54″N 77°55′42″W |
| Jack Bridge | 1984 | Jack Bridge Rd. | Willing | 42°4′33″N 77°55′28″W |
| Weidrick Road bridge | 1953 | Weidrick Rd. | Wellsville (town) | 42°6′3″N 77°56′20″W |
| Foot bridge | | Footpath; Former Wellsville, Addison and Galeton Railroad | Wellsville (village) | 42°6′54″N 77°56′40″W |
| State Street bridge | 2002 | W. State St. | Wellsville (village) | 42°7′8″N 77°56′48″W |
| Stevens Street bridge | 1974 | Stevens St. | Wellsville (village) | 42°7′14″N 77°56′57″W |
| Route 417 bridge | 1988 | NY 417 (Bolivar Road) | Wellsville (village) | 42°7′41″N 77°57′38″W |
| Wellsville Country Club bridge | | Footpath/Golf cart route | Wellsville (town) | 42°7′51″N 77°57′49″W |
| Knight Creek Road bridge | 1978 | CR 9 (Knight Creek Road) | Scio | 42°10′16″N 77°59′04″W |
| Corbin Hill Road bridge | 1971 | CR 31A (Corbin Hill Road) | Amity | 42°12′23″N 78°1′21″W |
| Belmont Dam | 1925 | | Belmont | 42°13′25″N 78°1′49″W |
| Route 19 bridge | 2009 | NY 19 (Schuyler Street) | Belmont | 42°13′25″N 78°1′51″W |
| Rail bridge | | Southern Tier Ext. of the Western NY and Penn. Railroad | Belmont | 42°13′32″N 78°1′59″W |
| Genesee Street bridge | 1997 | NY 244 (Genesee Street) | Belmont | 42°13′36″N 78°2′3″W |
| Gibson Hill Road bridge | 1959 | CR 20 (Gibson Hill Road) | Angelica | 42°15′50″N 78°3′7″W |
| Southern Tier Expressway bridges | 1975 | I-86 / NY 17 (Southern Tier Expressway) | Angelica | 42°15′53″N 78°3′30″W |
| County Road 16 bridge | 1934 | CR 16 | Angelica | 42°17′46″N 78°4′29″W |
| Hughes Street bridge | 1974 | CR 26 (East Hughes Street) | Belfast | 42°20′35″N 78°6′9″W |
| Caneadea Bridge | 1903 | CR 46 (East Hill Road); Closed for structural deficiencies 1993–2007, 2012– | Caneadea | 42°23′06″N 78°8′59″W |
| Council House Road bridge | 1989 | Council House Road | Caneadea | 42°24′02″N 78°9′15″W |
| Lattice Bridge | 1887 | Disused (early 1990s); Formerly Lattice Bridge Road | Caneadea | 42°26′14″N 78°7′46″W |
| County Route 4 bridge | 1980 | CR 4 | Hume | 42°27′49″N 78°6′13″W |
| Whiskey Bridge | 1973 | Bailey Road | Genesee Falls–Portage | 42°33′30″N 78°2′51″W |
| Route 436 Bridge | 1920 | NY 436 (Portage Street) | Genesee Falls–Portage (Letchworth State Park) | 42°34′17″N 78°2′26″W |
| New Portage Viaduct | 2017 | Southern Tier Line of the Norfolk Southern Railway | Genesee Falls–Portage (Letchworth State Park) | 42°34′39.3″N 78°2′58.5″W |
| Portage Viaduct | 1875 (demolished 2018) | Former Southern Tier Line of the Norfolk Southern Railway | Genesee Falls–Portage (Letchworth State Park) | 42°34′40″N 78°2′59″W |
| Stone footbridge | 1935 | Footpath | Genesee Falls–Portage (Letchworth State Park) | 42°35′9″N 78°1′4″W |
| Mount Morris Dam | 1952 | | Leicester–Mt. Morris (town) (Letchworth State Park) | 42°44′0″N 77°54′25″W |
| Genesee Valley Greenway pedestrian bridge | 2012 | Genesee Valley Greenway; Uses old Pennsylvania Railroad pilings (1881–1963); Possible old Genesee Valley Canal aqueduct pilings (1840–1878) | Leicester–Mt. Morris (village) | 42°44′17″N 77°52′57″W |
| Old Mt. Morris Dam | | | Leicester–Mt. Morris (village) | 42°44′18″N 77°52′54.5″W |
| Route 36 bridge | 1957 | NY 36 (Mt. Morris Road/N. Main Street) | Leicester–Mt. Morris (village) | 42°44′19″N 77°52′54″W |
| Rochester & Southern Railroad bridge | | Rochester and Southern Railroad | Leicester–Mt. Morris (village) | 42°44′24″N 77°52′40″W |
| Cuylerville Road bridge | 1970 | US 20A / NY 39 (Cuylerville Road) | Leicester–Geneseo | 42°46′37″N 77°50′28″W |
| Genesee Street bridge | 1950 | NY 63 (Genesee Street) | York–Geneseo | 42°48′17″N 77°49′38″W |
| Fowlerville Road bridge | 1950 | / County Route 5/County Route 22 (Fowlerville Road) | York–Avon (town) | 42°53′31″N 77°49′17″W |
| Main Street bridge | 2003 | US 20 / NY 5 (Caledonia Avon Road/W. Main Street) | Caledonia–Avon (village) | 42°55′5″N 77°45′26″W |
| Erie Railroad Avon–Attica Genesee River Bridge | ca. 1890/ca. 1910 | Abandoned (1976); Trail conversion proposed by 2013; Formerly Erie Railroad Avon–Attica line | Caledonia–Avon (village) | 42°55′29″N 77°45′29″W |
| Lehigh Valley Trail bridge | ca. 1892/ca. 1916 | Lehigh Valley Trail linear park (2004) former Lehigh Valley Railroad Black Diamond line | Caledonia–Rush | 42°59′4″N 77°43′54″W |
| Rush–Scottsville Road bridge | 1995 | NY 251 (Rush–Scottsville Road) | Wheatland–Rush | 43°0′17″N 77°43′50″W |
| Scottsville – West Henrietta Road bridge | 1976 | NY 253 (Scottsville – West Henrietta Road) | Wheatland–Henrietta | 43°1′47″N 77°43′25″W |
| Thruway bridges | 1952 | I-90 (New York State Thruway) | Chili–Henrietta | 43°2′35″N 77°43′34″W |
| Ballantyne Bridge | 2007 | NY 252 (Ballantyne Road/Jefferson Road) | Chili–Henrietta | 43°5′33″N 77°40′49″W |
| Ballantyne Bridge | 2007 | NY 252 (Ballantyne Road/Jefferson Road) | Chili–Brighton | 43°5′33″N 77°40′49″W |
| West Shore Genesee River Railway Bridge | 1905 | West Shore Subdivision of New York Central Lines (CSX) (LAL) Interchanges | Chili–Brighton | 43°5′52″N 77°40′40″W |
| Interstate 390 bridges | 1981 | I-390 (Genesee Expressway) | Chili–Brighton | 43°7′15″N 77°38′40″W |
| Erie Canal crossing | 1918 | Erie Canal (at-grade) | Chili–Brighton | 43°7′17″N 77°38′32″W |
| Erie Canal crossing | 1918 | Erie Canal (at-grade) | Rochester | 43°7′17″N 77°38′32″W |
| Genesee Valley Park pedestrian bridge | | Footpath; Erie Canal Heritage Trail (Erie Canal towpath) | Rochester | 43°7′19″N 77°38′23″W |
| Elmwood Avenue bridge | 1935 | Elmwood Avenue | Rochester | 43°7′27″N 77°37′57″W |
| Brooks Landing – University of Rochester pedestrian bridge | Early 1990s | Footpath | Rochester | 43°7′53″N 77°38′0″W |
| Erie–Lackawanna Railroad Bridge | Early 1900s | Rails-to-trails bike/pedestrian path (June 29, 2012); Abandoned (1971) | Rochester | 43°7′59″N 77°37′23″W |
| Ford Street bridge | 1844 | Ford Street | Rochester | 43°8′31″N 77°36′54″W |
| Frederick Douglass – Susan B. Anthony Memorial Bridge | 2007 | I-490 (Erie Canal Expressway) | Rochester | 43°9′4″N 77°36′33″W |
| Court Street Dam | 1918 | | Rochester | 43°9′08″N 77°36′31″W |
| Court Street Bridge | 1892 | Court Street | Rochester | 43°9′12″N 77°36′32″W |
| Broad Street Bridge | 1842 | Upper level: New York State Route 31 (East Broad Street); Lower level: Former Rochester Subway; Former Erie Canal aqueduct | Rochester | 43°9′17″N 77°36′34″W |
| Main Street Bridge | 1857 | East Main Street | Rochester | 43°9′22″N 77°36′37″W |
| Frank and Janet Lamb Sister Cities Bridge | 1968 | Footpath | Rochester | 43°9′27″N 77°36′40″W |
| Andrews Street Bridge | 1893 | Andrews Street | Rochester | 43°9′33″N 77°36′43″W |
| Inner Loop bridge | 1963 | Inner Loop | Rochester | 43°9′38″N 77°36′47″W |
| Rail bridge | | Rochester Subdivision of New York Central Lines (CSX) | Rochester | 43°9′39″N 77°36′47″W |
| Pont De Rennes bridge | 1891 | Footpath (1982) formerly Platt Street | Rochester | 43°9′46″N 77°36′55″W |
| Smith Street bridge | 1930 | Smith St./Bausch St. | Rochester | 43°9′57″N 77°37′13″W |
| Running Track Bridge | ca. 1879 | Decommissioned mid-1990s Former Rome, Watertown and Ogdensburg Railroad Hojack line | Rochester | 43°10′12″N 77°37′21″W |
| Middle Falls dam | | Genesee Riverway Trail | Rochester | 43°10′35″N 77°37′41″W |
| Driving Park Bridge | 1989 | Driving Park Avenue | Rochester | 43°10′52″N 77°37′41″W |
| Veterans Memorial Bridge | 1931 | NY 104 | Rochester | 43°11′33″N 77°37′14″W |
| Monroe County Pure Waters bridge | 1985 | Wide footpath Combined sewer overflow | Rochester | 43°11′52″N 77°37′14″W |
| Turning Point boardwalk (crosses basin; does not cross to east bank) | 2006 | Footpath | Rochester | 43°13′56″N 77°37′6″W |
| Colonel Patrick O'Rorke Memorial Bridge | 2004 | Pattonwood Drive | Rochester | 43°14′54″N 77°36′41″W |
| Hojack Swing Bridge | 1905 (demolished 2012) | Former Rome, Watertown and Ogdensburg Railroad Hojack line (Later New York Central Railroad) | Rochester | 43°15′12″N 77°36′29″W |
| Crossing | Opened | Carries | Location | Coordinates |
