= New York State Route 248 =

Highway in New York

New York State Route 248
- NY 248 highlighted in red, NY 248A in blue

Route information
- Maintained by NYSDOT
- Length: 31.43 mi (50.58 km)
- Existed: 1930–present

Major junctions
- West end: NY 19 in Willing
- East end: NY 36 in Canisteo

Location
- Country: United States
- State: New York
- Counties: Allegany, Steuben

Highway system
- New York Highways; Interstate; US; State; Reference; Parkways
← NY 247	→ NY 249
← NY 17F	NY 17G	→ NY 17J

New York State Route 248 (NY 248) is a 31.43-mile-long (50.58 km) state highway in a remote part of the Southern Tier region of New York in the United States. The route, located close to the Pennsylvania state line, passes through Allegany and Steuben counties. In the former, it runs mostly east–west from its junction with NY 19 in Stannards; but in the latter turns northwards to its north end at NY 36 in Canisteo. NY 248 used to be signed north–south in Steuben County, however, those designation were replaced by new east–west signage around 2013.

The origins of NY 248 date back to 1912, when most of the route was designated as an unsigned legislative route by the New York State Legislature. The first posted numbers along the route were assigned as part of the 1930 renumbering of state highways in New York. At this time, NY 248 was assigned to the portion of its modern routing north of Greenwood while the section between NY 19 and NY 417 (then NY 17) was designated as New York State Route 17G. NY 248 was extended southwestward over NY 17G in the early 1940s.

== Route description ==
=== Allegany County ===
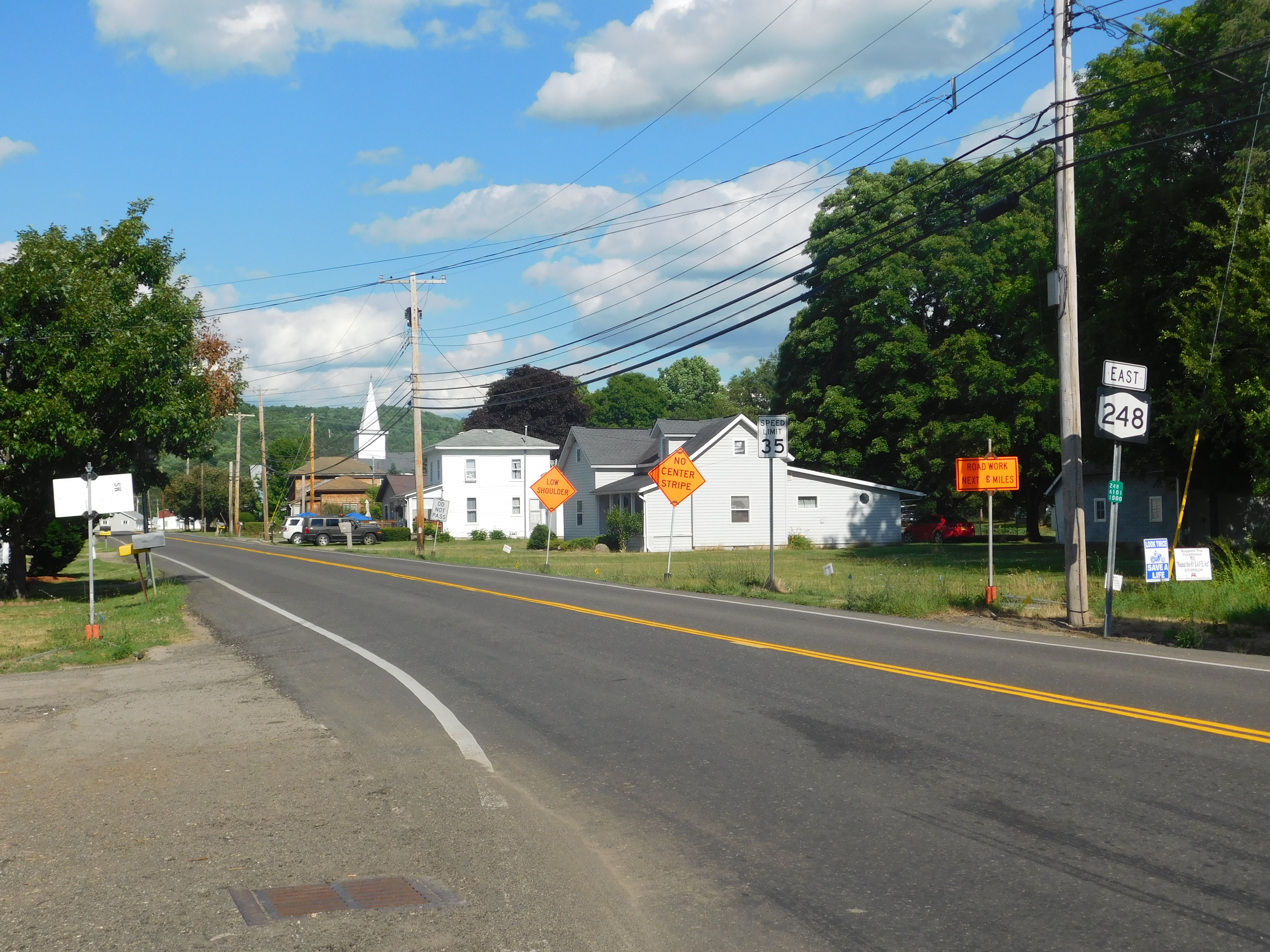
NY 248 in Stannards

NY 248 begins at an intersection with NY 19 in the hamlet of Stannards, located within the town of Willing. It heads generally eastward from the community as Hallsport Road, following Chenunda Creek (a tributary of the Genesee River) into a largely rural portion of the town. Here, the route passes by a series of fields and a handful of isolated homes before leaving the creek and entering Hallsport, a small community near the eastern town line. Past Hallsport, NY 248 follows a more southeasterly routing for just under 1 mile (1.6 km) to the town line, where it turns back to the east as it proceeds into the town of Independence and becomes known only by its route number.

About 2 miles (3.2 km) into Independence, the highway makes a sharp curve to the south into a more forested area of Allegany County. At this point, the route begins to descend in elevation as it heads through a small valley surrounding an offshoot of Cryder Creek. Just outside Whitesville, the small, narrow valley gives way to a wider one surrounding Cryder Creek itself, and NY 248 turns eastward into the latter valley to enter Whitesville as Main Street. In the hamlet, NY 248 intersects its lone spur route, NY 248A, and crosses Cryder Creek, which splits into Marsh and Spring Mills Creeks a short distance to the northeast. At the eastern edge of Whitesville, NY 248 turns northward onto Wildman Avenue, crossing over Spring Mills Creek and following Marsh Creek northeastward out of both Whitesville and Allegany County.

=== Steuben County ===
Across the county line in Steuben County, NY 248 passes through rural, forested areas as it proceeds northeast along the base of a valley surrounding Marsh Creek. Roughly 2 miles (3.2 km) into the town of West Union, the creek gives way to a large, marshy lake, which NY 248 straddles while proceeding northeastward, and later southeastward through the valley. The valley ends 2 miles (3.2 km) southeast of the hamlet of Barney Falls and 6 miles (10 km) from the county line, allowing the route to turn northward and enter Rexville, a small community based around the junction of NY 248 and County Route 117. Here, NY 248 joins Bennetts Creek, which the route follows for the rest of its existence.

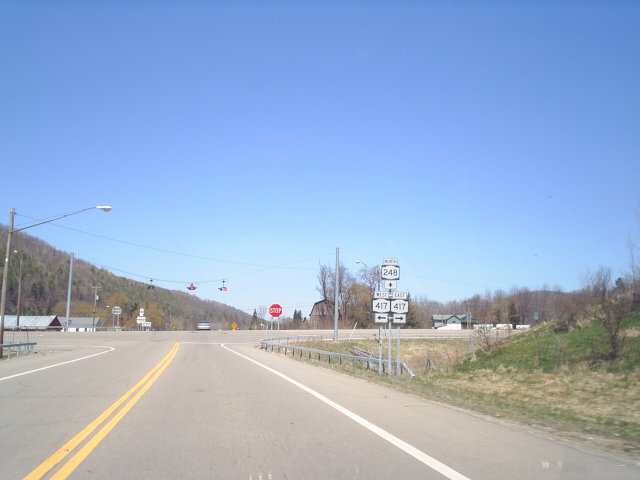
Junction of NY 248 and NY 417 north of Greenwood hamlet

Outside of Rexville, the route heads north through another forested valley—this time surrounding Bennetts Creek—to the town of Greenwood and the hamlet of the same name, the largest location on the route between Whitesville and the village of Canisteo. NY 248 heads north–south through the community, serving as its main street, before intersecting NY 417 north of the hamlet. The route continues on, passing through sparsely populated areas of the towns of Greenwood and Canisteo as it proceeds along the base of a wider, less pronounced valley around Bennetts Creek. The surroundings change immediately upon crossing over Purdy Creek and into the village of Canisteo, where NY 248 becomes Greenwood Street and passes by the village's schools (Canisteo-Greenwood Elementary/Middle School and the Canisteo-Greenwood High School, both part of the Canisteo-Greenwood Central School District) and several densely populated village blocks. After eight blocks, the street and the route come to an end at Main Street (NY 36).

== History ==
The portion of modern NY 248 east of Whitesville was originally designated as Route 4-b, an unsigned legislative route, by the New York State Legislature in 1912. On March 1, 1921, Route 4-b was renumbered to Route 46 and extended westward along what is now NY 248 and NY 19 to Wellsville. No part of legislative Route 46 was assigned a posted designation when the first set of posted routes in New York were assigned in 1924; however, the entire route received a number as part of the 1930 renumbering of state highways in New York. From Stannards to Greenwood, legislative Route 46 was designated as NY 17G, a southerly alternate route of NY 17 (now NY 417). The section of the route between Stannards and Wellsville became part of NY 19 while the remainder of old Route 46—from Greenwood to Canisteo—became NY 248. NY 17G became part of an extended NY 248 in the early 1940s.

In 1964, the New York State Department of Public Works proposed trading over 80 miles (130 km) of roads that were not managing 1,000 or more cars daily for the construction of 30 miles (48 km) of the Southern Tier Expressway (NY 17). This list of proposed transfers included NY 248 and its spur, NY 248A in their entirety, along with NY 244, NY 275 and sections of NY 408, NY 70 and NY 19. In August 1964, the county declined to sign the offer.

== Major intersections ==
County	Location	mi	km	Destinations	Notes
Allegany	Willing	0.00	0.00	NY 19 – Genesee, Wellsville	Western terminus; hamlet of Stannards
Allegany	Independence	9.37	15.08	NY 248A south – Genesee	Northern terminus of NY 248A; hamlet of Whitesville
Steuben	Greenwood	22.19	35.71	NY 417 – Andover, Jasper	
Steuben	Village of Canisteo	31.43	50.58	NY 36 (Main Street)	Eastern terminus
1.000 mi = 1.609 km; 1.000 km = 0.621 mi

== NY 248A ==
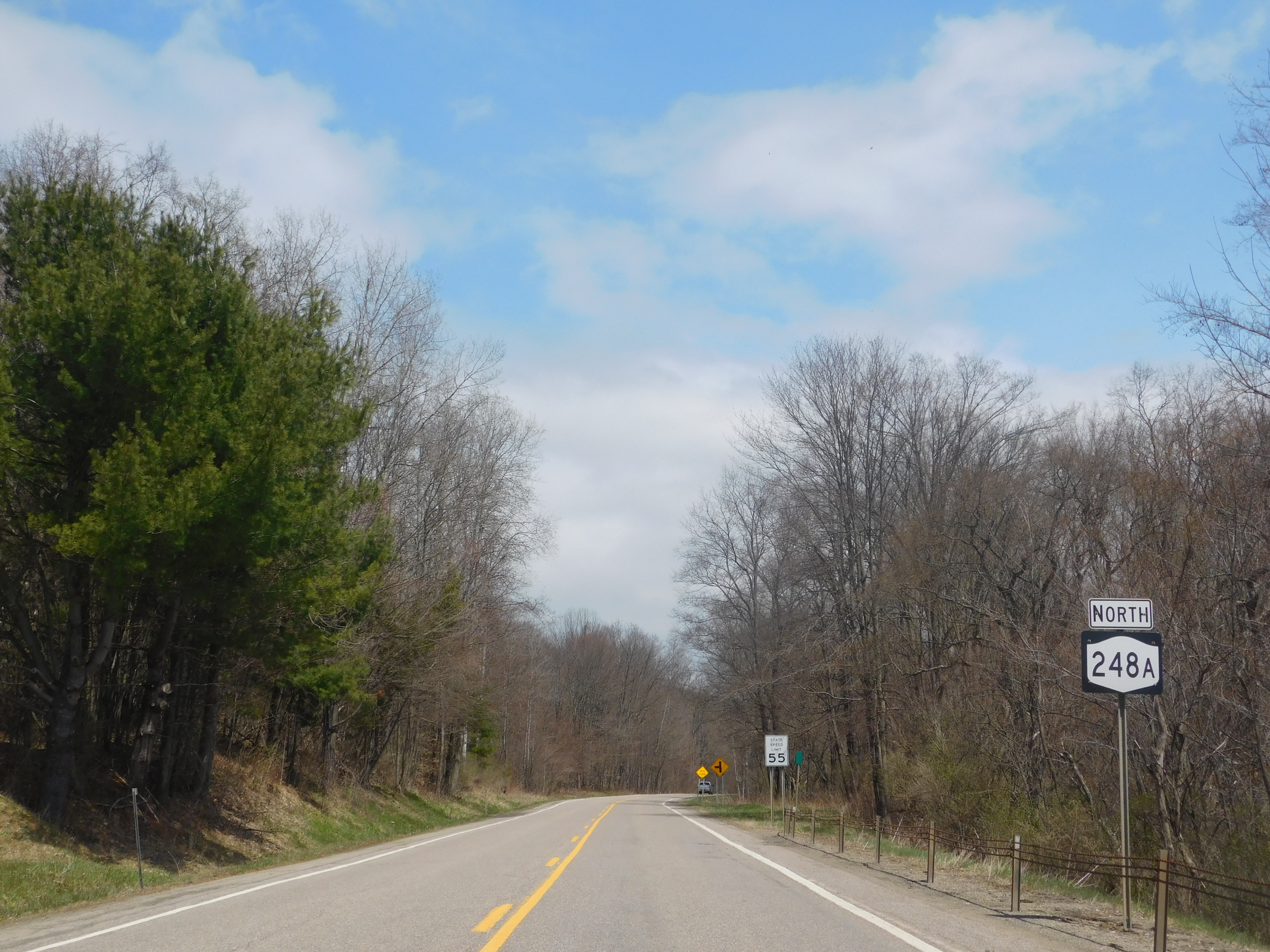
NY 248A northbound from the PA state line in Willing

New York State Route 248A
- Location: Pennsylvania state line–Whitesville
- Length: 5.17 mi (8.32 km)

NY 248A is a 5.17-mile (8.32 km) spur connecting NY 248 to the Pennsylvania state line in Allegany County. The route originates at the state line in Willing and continues northeast along the northern edge of a valley surrounding Cryder Creek to Whitesville, where it terminates at NY 248. NY 248A becomes Pennsylvania Route 244 upon entering Pennsylvania. The route was assigned in September 1950.

The entire route is in Allegany County.

Location	mi	km	Destinations	Notes
Willing	0.00	0.00	PA 244 west – Genesee	Continues west as PA 244 at the Pennsylvania border
Independence	5.17	8.32	NY 248 – Greenwood, Wellsville	Northern terminus
1.000 mi = 1.609 km; 1.000 km = 0.621 mi
