= Ward, New York =

- Town
- Location within New York Location within the United States
- Coordinates: 42°13′30″N 77°54′5″W
- Country: United States
- State: New York
- County: Allegany

Government
  - Type: Town council
  - Town supervisor: James Lucey (D)
  - Town council: Members' list: • Charles Deichmann Jr. (R); • Daniel Sprung (R); • Joseph Decker (D); • Samuel Patello (R)

Area
  - Total: 29.19 sq mi (75.61 km^{2})
  - Land: 29.17 sq mi (75.56 km^{2})
  - Water: 0.015 sq mi (0.04 km^{2})
- Elevation: 2,211 ft (674 m)

Population (2020)
  - Total: 331 ▼
  - Estimate (2021): 329
  - Density: 12/sq mi (4.7/km^{2})
- Time zone: UTC-5 (Eastern (EST))
  - Summer (DST): UTC-4 (EDT)
- ZIP Codes: 14803 (Alfred Station); 14806 (Andover); 14813 (Belmont); 14880 (Scio)
- FIPS code: 36-003-78201
- GNIS feature ID: 0979596

Ward is a town in Allegany County, New York, United States. The population was 331 at the 2020 census. The town was named after Hamilton Ward.

The town is in the southeast quadrant of the county, north of the village of Wellsville.

== History ==
The first settler arrived around 1817. The town of Ward was created in 1856 from parts of the towns of Alfred and Amity.

The only significant community, Phillips Creek, was first settled between 1830 and 1835.

In the summer of 1838, a violent windstorm caused destruction of property and loss of life.

== Geography ==
According to the United States Census Bureau, the town has a total area of 29.2 square miles (76 km^{2}), of which 29.2 square miles (76 km^{2}) is land and 0.03% is water.

NY 244 is a major east–west highway through the north part of the town.

== Demographics ==
Historical population
Census	Pop.	Note	%±
1860	877		—
1870	745		−15.1%
1880	620		−16.8%
1890	567		−8.5%
1900	547		−3.5%
1910	496		−9.3%
1920	400		−19.4%
1930	299		−25.2%
1940	250		−16.4%
1950	239		−4.4%
1960	234		−2.1%
1970	271		15.8%
1980	362		33.6%
1990	334		−7.7%
2000	390		16.8%
2010	368		−5.6%
2020	331		−10.1%
2021 (est.)	329		−0.6%
U.S. Decennial Census

As of the census of 2000, there were 390 people, 133 households, and 107 families residing in the town. The population density was 13.4 inhabitants per square mile (5.2/km^{2}). There were 244 housing units at an average density of 8.4 per square mile (3.2/km^{2}). The racial makeup of the town was 97.69% White, 1.03% African American and 1.28% Asian.

There were 133 households, out of which 41.4% had children under the age of 18 living with them, 70.7% were married couples living together, 6.8% had a female householder with no husband present, and 18.8% were non-families. 14.3% of all households were made up of individuals, and 6.0% had someone living alone who was 65 years of age or older. The average household size was 2.88 and the average family size was 3.19.

In the town, the population was spread out, with 30.3% under the age of 18, 6.7% from 18 to 24, 28.2% from 25 to 44, 24.9% from 45 to 64, and 10.0% who were 65 years of age or older. The median age was 36 years. For every 100 females, there were 93.1 males. For every 100 females aged 18 and over, there were 98.5 males.

The median income for a household in the town was $40,750, and the median income for a family was $41,000. Males had a median income of $30,000 versus $22,292 for females. The per capita income for the town was $15,271. About 12.9% of families and 14.9% of the population were below the poverty line, including 16.7% of those under age 18 and 2.6% of those age 65 or over.

== Communities and locations in Ward ==
- Phillips Creek – A hamlet near the north town line on Route 244. A nearby stream named "Phillips Creek" gives the community its name.
- Vandermark Creek – A stream that flows to the southwest.
