= New York State Route 17F =

Former state highway in New York State

New York State Route 17F
- NY 17F highlighted in red

Route information
- Auxiliary route of NY 17
- Maintained by NYSDH
- Length: 49.11 mi (79.03 km)
- Existed: 1930–early 1940s

Major junctions
- West end: NY 17 in Andover
- NY 21 near Canisteo
- East end: NY 17 in Addison

Location
- Country: United States
- State: New York
- Counties: Allegany, Steuben

Highway system
- New York Highways; Interstate; US; State; Reference; Parkways
← NY 17E	→ NY 17G
← NY 431	NY 432	→ NY 433

New York State Route 17F (NY 17F) was a 49.11-mile-long (79.03 km) state highway located in the Southern Tier of New York in the United States. The western terminus of the route was at then-NY 17 (now NY 417) in Andover, Allegany County. The eastern terminus was at NY 17 (current NY 417) in Addison, Steuben County. NY 17F was an alternate to NY 17 between the two locations, branching north to serve Almond, Hornell, and Canisteo.

NY 17F was removed in the early 1940s and replaced with various routes, including NY 36, NY 21, Steuben County Route 119 (CR 119), and New York State Route 432 (the latter of which eventually became part of CR 119 itself).

== Route description ==
NY 17F began at an intersection with NY 17 (modern NY 417) in the village of Andover. The route headed through the village, intersecting with the local roads. NY 17F left Andover and headed north for several miles, intersecting with NY 244 and CR 42 at 8.5 miles (13.7 kilometres) in Alfred Station. NY 17F headed north out of Alfred Station and intersected with CR 12 at 11.9 miles (19.2 kilometres).

NY 17F entered the village of Almond, paralleling the right-of-way of the modern Southern Tier Expressway and intersecting with CR 2. NY 17F entered Steuben County and entered the city of Hornell at 16.2 miles (26.1 kilometres). NY 17F then turned to the south in Hornell, overlapping NY 21 (now NY 36) south to the village of Canisteo. Within the village, it intersected with NY 248 at 22.7 miles (36.5 kilometres) before separating from NY 21 and continuing eastward out of Canisteo. NY 17F then passed through the towns of Cameron and Rathbone before coming to an end at NY 17 (current NY 417) in Addison.

== History ==
The construction of future NY 17F was divided into multiple parts, the construction of the road between Addison village and the hamlet of Rathbone and one between Rathbone and the town of Canisteo. The first section constructed was the stretch between Addison and Rathbone, with construction beginning in 1921. The contract was signed to Frank J. Foote, Inc for construction of the new road. By October 1921, the new road was constructed a mile (1.6 km) from the village of Addison to Baldwin Cemetery. The project was not without its controversy. In July 1922, six workers went on strike after the contractor did not meet their demands to raise wages from 35¢; an hour to 40¢. The strikers amounting to six would make it appear to the contractor that a change of heart was had by most of the workers. The company stated that if they all had struck, there might have been a raise in wage, but not with the lack of workers. The new road was about complete in August 1922, with the exception of the tarva top that would go on the roads. By August 10, the road was completed with a speculated opening date of September 1, 1922. By November 1922, the road was open to traffic.

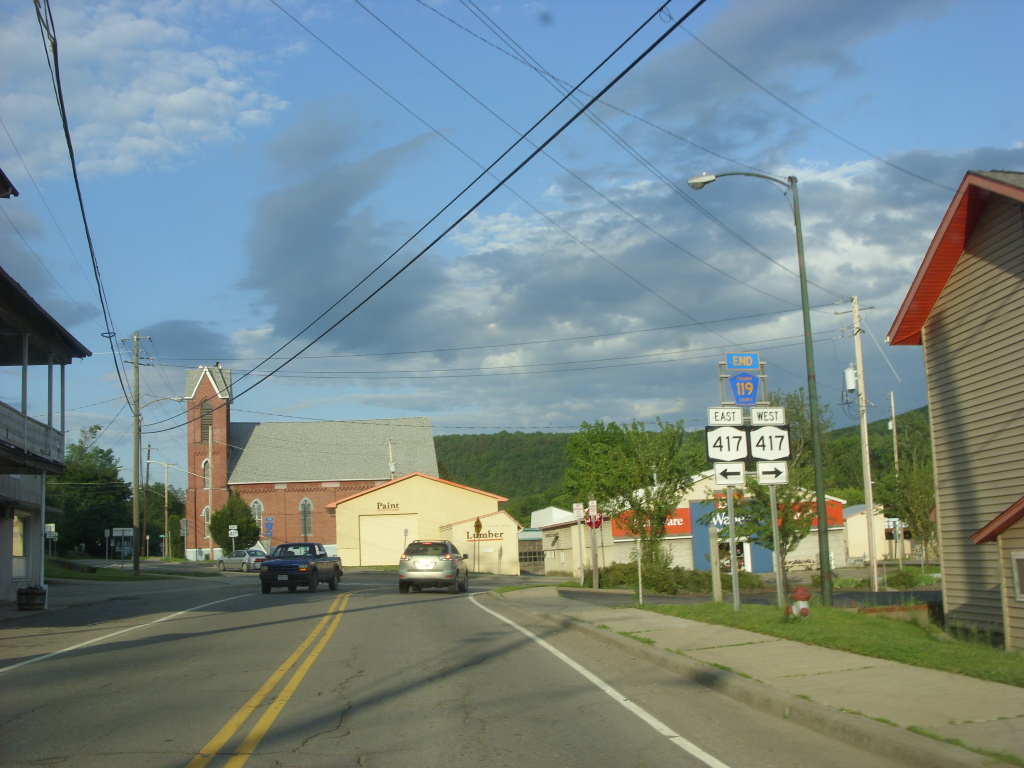
Signage at the junction of CR 119 and NY 417 in Addison, which once marked the terminus of both NY 17F and NY 432 at different points

When state highways were first numbered in New York in 1924, NY 17 originally followed a different, more northerly alignment between Andover and Jasper. Instead of continuing east to Jasper on a direct line from Andover, NY 17 curved north to serve Hornell by way of what is now NY 21 and NY 36. NY 17 was rerouted in the 1930 renumbering to follow a previously unnumbered direct route between Andover and Jasper while the old routing between Andover and Hornell became NY 17F. NY 17F also continued south along NY 21 (which replaced NY 17 from Hornell to Jasper) to Canisteo, then east over an unnumbered roadway to NY 17 in Addison (via Cameron and Rathbone).

NY 17F remained unchanged until the early 1940s when the route was removed from the state highway system. The portion between Andover and Hornell became an extension of NY 36 while the short segment between Myers Creek southeast of Rathbone and Addison became NY 432. The remainder of Canisteo River Road from Canisteo to Rathbone became CR 119.

New York State Route 432
- Location: Rathbone–Addison
- Existed: 1940s–June 25, 1998

NY 432 was decommissioned on September 12, 1950. NY 432 was restored between 1970 and 1978, and stayed intact up to April 1, 1997, when a large-scale highway swap between the New York State Department of Transportation (NYSDOT) and Steuben County eventually resulted in the transfer of NY 432 to the county. In exchange for assuming maintenance over NY 415 from Meads Creek Road in Coopers Plains (northwest of Painted Post) to Babcock Hollow Road in Bath as well as Hamilton Street from U.S. Route 15 in Erwin to Robert Dann Drive in Gang Mills, NYSDOT transferred both NY 432 and nearby NY 333 to Steuben County. NY 333 was redesignated as CR 333 immediately following the swap; NY 432, however, remained in place for an additional 14 months before becoming part of an extended CR 119 on June 25, 1998.

== Major intersections ==
County	Location	mi	km	Destinations	Notes
Allegany	Village of Andover	0.00	0.00	NY 17	Now NY 417
Allegany	Alfred	8.71	14.02	NY 244	Eastern terminus of NY 244
Steuben	Hornell	17.36	27.94	NY 21 north	Now NY 36; northern terminus of NY 17F / NY 21 overlap
Steuben	Village of Canisteo	22.69	36.52	NY 248	Northern terminus of NY 248
Steuben	Village of Canisteo	24.08	38.75	NY 21 south	Now NY 36; southern terminus of NY 17F / NY 21 overlap
Steuben	Village of Addison	49.11	79.03	NY 17	Now NY 417
1.000 mi = 1.609 km; 1.000 km = 0.621 mi: Concurrency terminus

== See also ==
- List of county routes in Steuben County, New York
