= Pennsylvania Route 449 =

State highway in Potter County, Pennsylvania, US

Pennsylvania Route 449

Route information
- Maintained by PennDOT
- Length: 17.131 mi (27.570 km)
- Existed: 1961–present

Major junctions
- South end: US 6 in Walton
- PA 49 in Gold; PA 244 in Genesee Township
- North end: NY 19 at the New York state line in Genesee Township

Location
- Country: United States
- State: Pennsylvania
- Counties: Potter

Highway system
- Pennsylvania State Route System; Interstate; US; State; Scenic; Legislative
← PA 447	→ PA 450

Pennsylvania Route 449 (PA 449) is a 17-mile-long (27 km) state highway located in Potter County, Pennsylvania. The southern terminus is at U.S. Route 6 (US 6) in Walton. The northern terminus is the New York state line in Genesee Township, where the road continues into that state as New York State Route 19 (NY 19).

== Route description ==
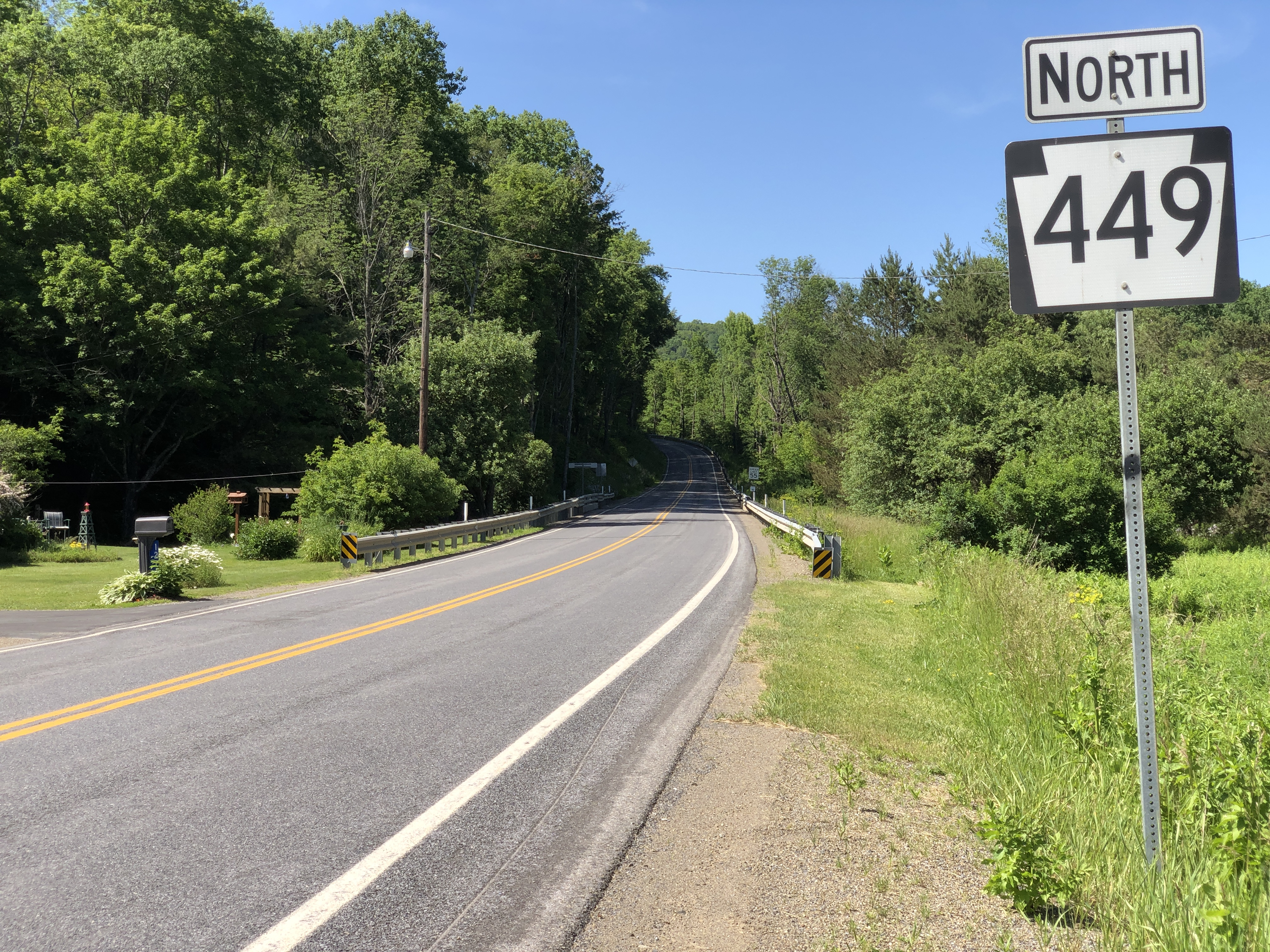
PA 449 northbound in Ulysses Township

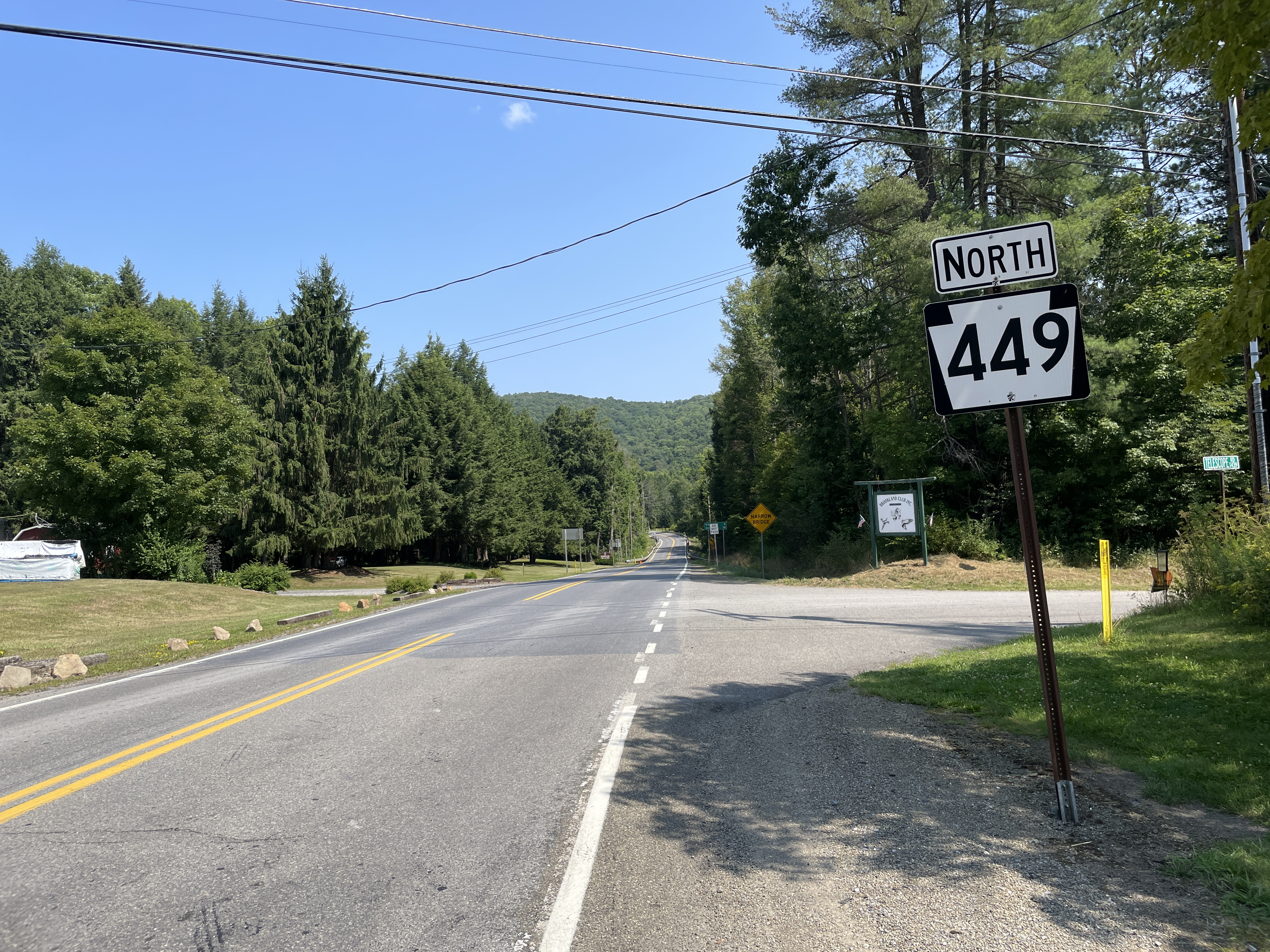
PA 449 northbound past US 6 in Ulysses Township

PA 449 begins at an intersection with US 6 in the community of Walton in Ulysses Township, heading northwest on Brookland Road parallel to the Pine Creek. The road heads through forested mountains in the Susquehannock State Forest before coming to the community of Brookland, where it crosses the creek twice in quick succession. After passing through more forests, the route enters agricultural areas and becomes Gold Road, crossing the Genesee River and intersecting PA 49 in the community of Gold. From this point, PA 449 turns north and continues through a mix of farmland and woodland in a narrow valley parallel to the Genesee River. The road briefly enters Allegany Township before heading into Genesee Township and passing through the community of Harmontown. The route runs through more rural areas before intersecting PA 244 in the community of Genesee. PA 244 formed a concurrency through Genesee on Main Street from 2003 until 2011 while the School Street Bridge was closed. Through Genesee, the road passes homes and businesses, briefly becoming a two-lane divided highway before the intersection with Commercial Street. At this intersection, PA 449 turns to the west and heads northwest out of Genesee on two-lane undivided North Genesee Street into a mix of farms, woods, and homes. PA 449 ends at the New York border, where the road becomes NY 19.

== Major intersections ==
The entire route is in Potter County.

Location	mi	km	Destinations	Notes
Ulysses Township	0.000	0.000	US 6 (Grand Army of the Republic Highway) – Galeton, Wellsboro, Coudersport	Southern terminus
Ulysses Township	7.522	12.105	PA 49 – Coudersport, Lawrenceville	
Genesee Township	16.155	25.999	PA 244 (Ellisburg Road / School Street) – Coneville, Whitesville	
Genesee Township	17.131	27.570	NY 19 north (Stannards Road) – Wellsville	New York state line; northern terminus
1.000 mi = 1.609 km; 1.000 km = 0.621 mi

== PA 449 Truck ==
Pennsylvania Route 449 Truck
- Location: Potter County, Pennsylvania

Pennsylvania Route 449 Truck is a truck route around weight-restricted bridges over the Pine Creek and Genesee River in Ulysses Township, on which trucks over 32 tons and combination loads over 40 tons are prohibited. The route follows US 6, PA 44, and PA 49. The truck route was established in 2013.
