= Andover, New York =

- Town
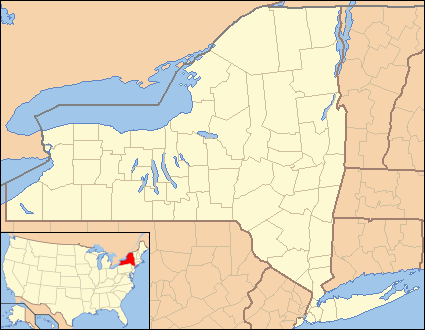
- Location in New York
- Coordinates: 42°09′15″N 77°47′42″W
- Country: United States
- State: New York
- County: Allegany

Government
  - Type: Town Council
  - Town Supervisor: Gus Weber (R)
  - Town Council: Members: • Wayne Grant (R); • Mike Hulse (R); • Harry Snoreck (R); • Robert Frost (R)

Area
  - Total: 39.50 sq mi (102.30 km^{2})
  - Land: 39.43 sq mi (102.12 km^{2})
  - Water: 0.066 sq mi (0.17 km^{2})

Population (2020)
  - Total: 1,634 ▼
  - Estimate (2021): 1,615
  - Density: 45/sq mi (17.2/km^{2})
- Time zone: Eastern (EST)
- ZIP Codes: 14806 (Andover); 14895 (Wellsville); 14880 (Scio)
- FIPS code: 36-003-02154
- Website: www.townofandoverny.com

Andover is a town in Allegany County, New York, United States. The population was 1,634 at the 2020 census. The town is on the eastern edge of Allegany County and contains the village of Andover.

== History ==
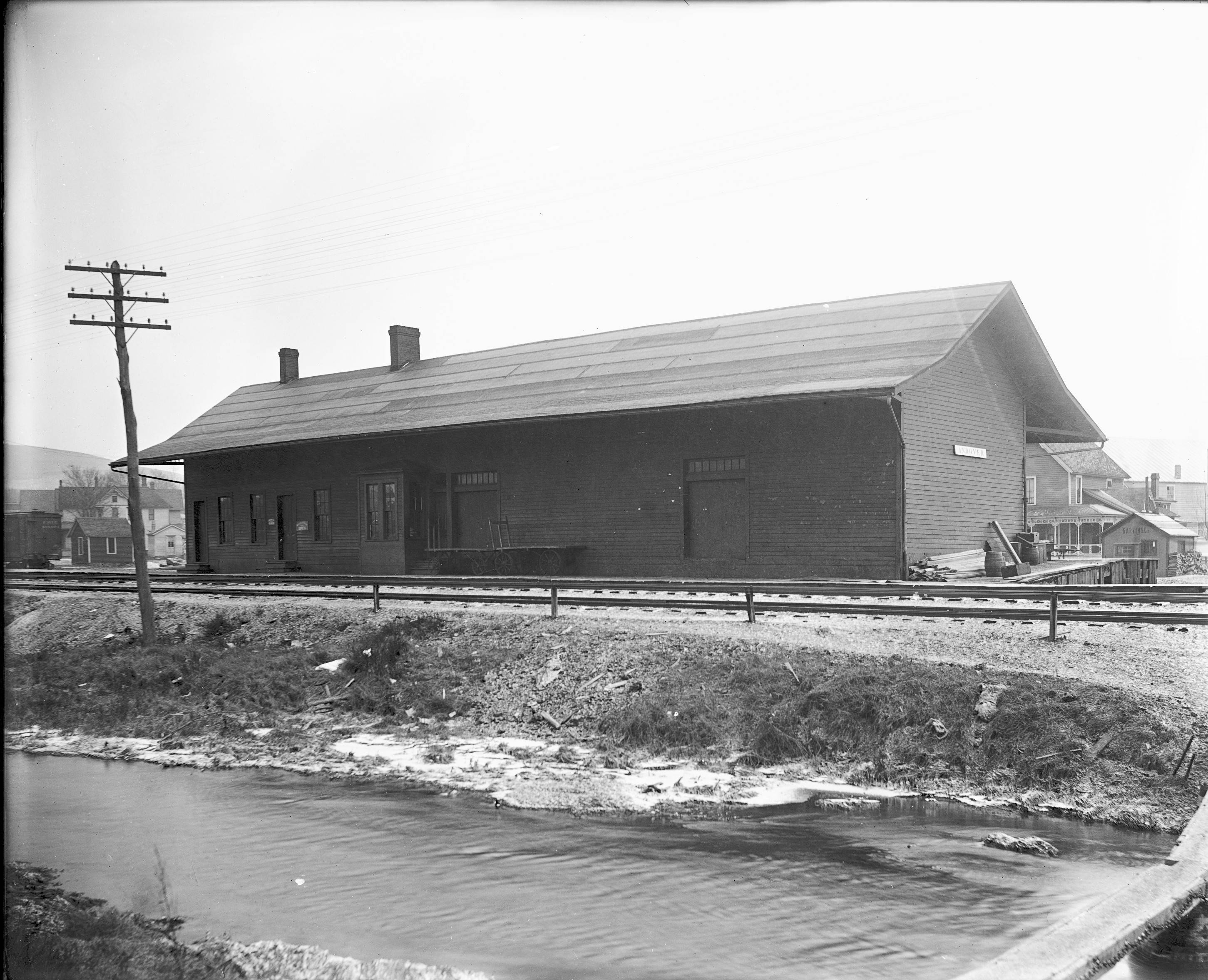
The former Erie Railroad station in Andover, c. 1907–1912

The town's area was first settled c. 1795. The Town of Andover was established in 1824 from part of the town of Independence. The size of the town was increased in 1855 by a part of the town of Wellsville.

== Geography ==
According to the United States Census Bureau, the town has a total area of 39.5 square miles (102.3 km^{2}), of which 39.4 square miles (102.1 km^{2}) is land and 0.077 square miles (0.2 km^{2}), or 0.17%, is water.

The east town line is the border of Steuben County.

New York State Route 21 ends at New York State Route 417 at Andover village.

== Demographics ==
Historical population
Census	Pop.	Note	%±
1830	598		—
1840	848		41.8%
1850	1,476		74.1%
1860	1,724		16.8%
1870	1,873		8.6%
1880	1,988		6.1%
1890	1,766		−11.2%
1900	1,869		5.8%
1910	1,990		6.5%
1920	1,809		−9.1%
1930	1,905		5.3%
1940	1,996		4.8%
1950	1,973		−1.2%
1960	1,801		−8.7%
1970	1,839		2.1%
1980	1,956		6.4%
1990	1,981		1.3%
2000	1,945		−1.8%
2010	1,830		−5.9%
2020	1,634		−10.7%
2021 (est.)	1,615	▼	−1.2%
U.S. Decennial Census

As of the census of 2000, there were 1,945 people, 742 households, and 517 families residing in the town. The population density was 49.3 inhabitants per square mile (19.0/km^{2}). There were 877 housing units at an average density of 22.2 per square mile (8.6/km^{2}). The racial makeup of the town was 97.89% White, 0.15% Black or African American, 0.10% Native American, 0.51% Asian, 0.46% from other races, and 0.87% from two or more races. Hispanic or Latino of any race were 1.13% of the population.

There were 742 households, out of which 34.0% had children under the age of 18 living with them, 58.0% were married couples living together, 7.5% had a female householder with no husband present, and 30.2% were non-families. 24.9% of all households were made up of individuals, and 12.0% had someone living alone who was 65 years of age or older. The average household size was 2.62 and the average family size was 3.13.

In the town, the population was spread out, with 27.8% under the age of 18, 9.1% from 18 to 24, 25.5% from 25 to 44, 23.5% from 45 to 64, and 14.1% who were 65 years of age or older. The median age was 36 years. For every 100 females, there were 93.9 males. For every 100 females age 18 and over, there were 93.3 males.

The median income for a household in the town was $34,107, and the median income for a family was $40,341. Males had a median income of $30,742 versus $21,012 for females. The per capita income for the town was $19,273. About 7.2% of families and 10.4% of the population were below the poverty line, including 13.3% of those under age 18 and 3.6% of those age 65 or over.

== Communities and locations ==
- Andover – Village of Andover is in the central part of the town on State Routes 417 (East Chestnut Street) and 21.
- Dyke Creek – A stream flowing across the town, named after an early settler.
- Elm Valley – A hamlet (formerly "Shoemakers Corners") at the western town line on Route 417 (Andover Road).

== Notable people ==
- Thomas Allen, Wisconsin Secretary of State and politician, was born in Andover.
- Patsy Dougherty, outfielder, first player to hit two home runs in a single World Series game, was born in Andover.
