= Pennsylvania Route 244 =

State highway in Potter County, Pennsylvania, US

Pennsylvania Route 244

Route information
- Maintained by PennDOT
- Length: 17.191 mi (27.666 km)
- Existed: 1928–present

Major junctions
- West end: PA 44 near Oswayo
- PA 449 in Genesee
- East end: NY 248A near Genesee

Location
- Country: United States
- State: Pennsylvania
- Counties: Potter

Highway system
- Pennsylvania State Route System; Interstate; US; State; Scenic; Legislative
← PA 243	→ PA 245

Pennsylvania Route 244 (PA 244) is a 17-mile-long (27 km) state highway located in Potter County, Pennsylvania. The western terminus is at PA 44 in Coneville. The eastern terminus is the New York state line in Genesee Township. The route passes through rural areas, intersecting PA 449 in Genesee. The route was paved in 1931 and designated by 1941 between PA 44 and PA 449. PA 244 was extended to the New York state line in 1982. In 2011, the Genesee River bridge was replaced, eliminating a detour that had been in place since 2003.

== Route description ==
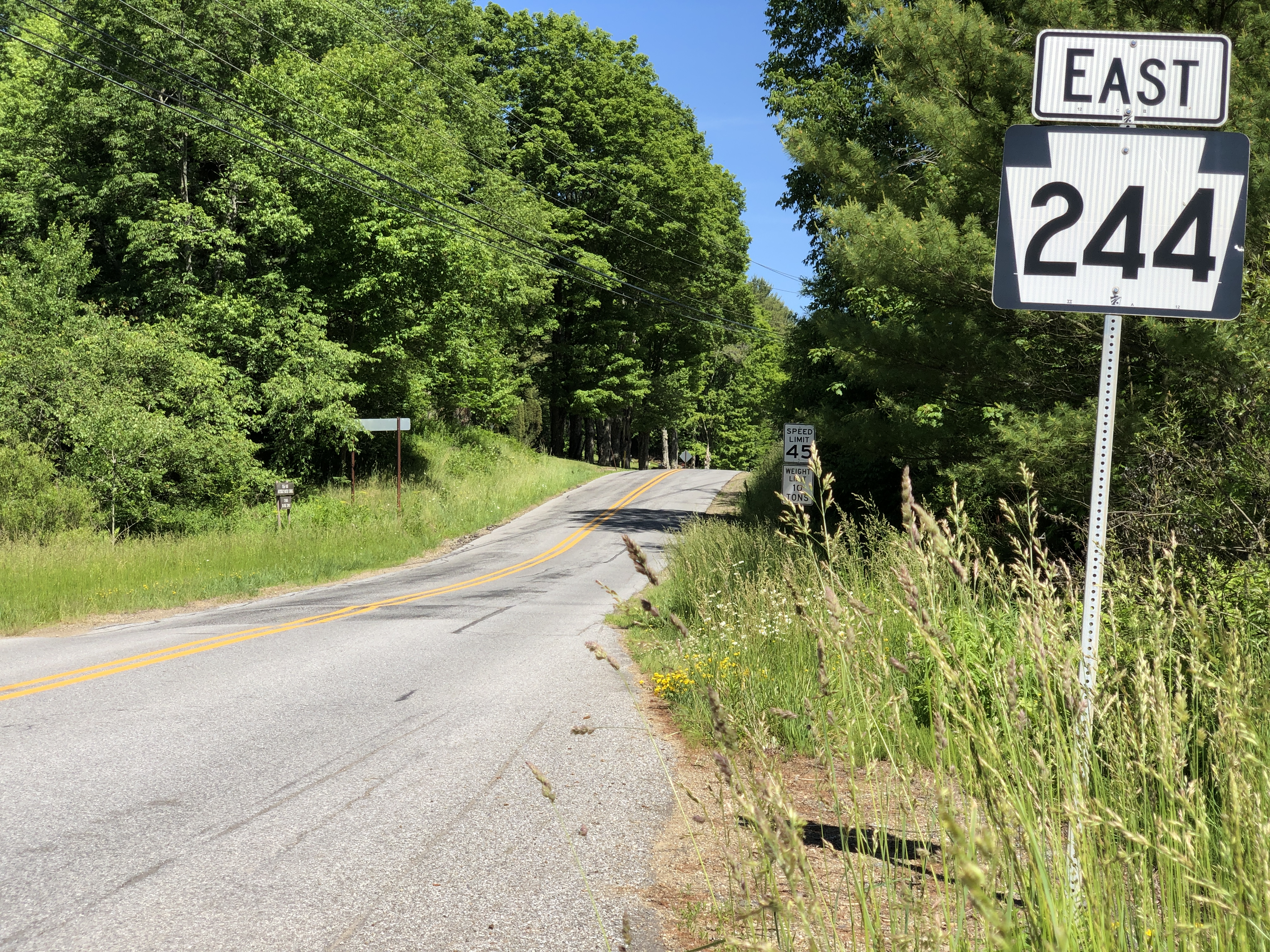
PA 244 eastbound in Oswayo Township

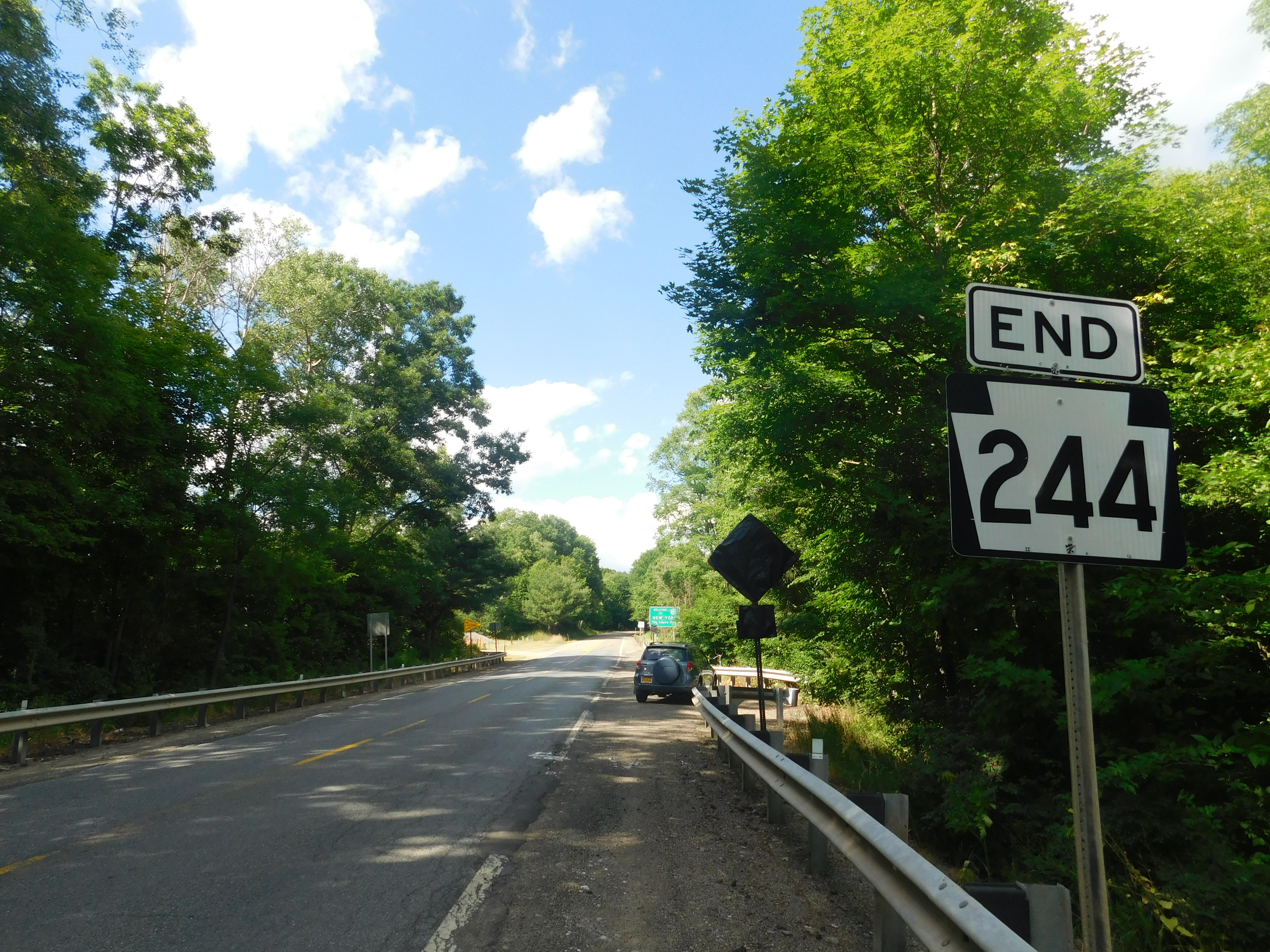
PA 244 approaching the New York state line in Genesee

PA 244 begins at an intersection with PA 44 in the community of Coneville in Hebron Township, heading east-northeast on a two-lane undivided road. The road runs through a narrow valley with some agriculture and homes parallel to the Oswayo Creek, entering the borough of Oswayo. At this point, the route becomes Main Street and passes a few homes before crossing into Oswayo Township. PA 244 heads east on Rose Lake Road through hilly forested areas, turning southeast and briefly entering Genesee Township before continuing into Allegany Township. The route heads east into agricultural areas and turns north onto Andrews Settlement Road in the community of Andrews Settlement.

The road heads back into Genesee Township and passes through a mix of farms and woods as it passes through Ellisburg. Farther north, PA 244 continues through a narrow agricultural valley with a few homes parallel to the West Branch Genesee River as Ellisburg Road, running through Chapmans. The route turns northeast through forests and reaches an intersection with PA 449 in the community of Genesee. PA 244 continues east as School Street and crosses the Genesee River on a bridge. The route turns to the north at SR 1010, continuing to the New York border. At the border, PA 244 ends and the road becomes NY 248A.

== History ==
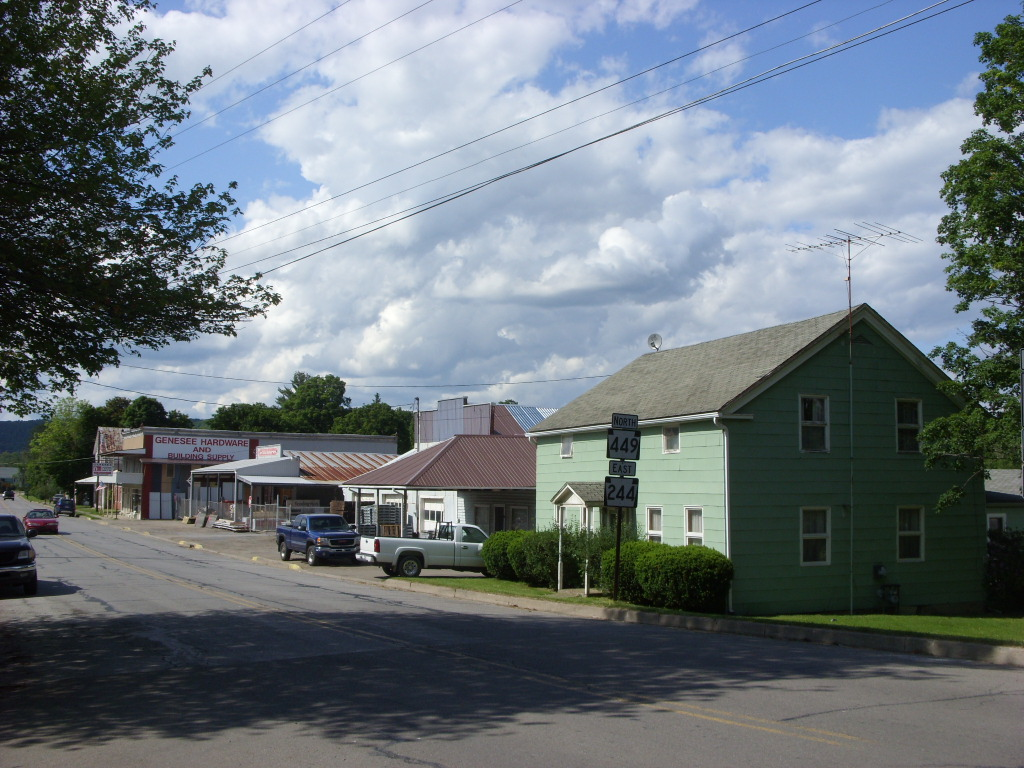
Photo of the former PA 244/PA 449 concurrency in Genesee Township

Most of PA 244's route was paved in 1931 and was signed by 1941. Originally, PA 244 ended at PA 449 in Genesee, but by 1982 it was extended east across the Genesee River to the New York state line. In 2003, the School Street Bridge carrying PA 244 across the Genesee River was closed due to its age and deteriorating conditions. This closure forced PA 244 to share a short concurrency with PA 449 and SR 1010 in Genesee. In 2011, a new bridge opened returning PA 244 to its original alignment.

== Major intersections ==
The entire route is in Potter County.

Location	mi	km	Destinations	Notes
Hebron Township	0.000	0.000	PA 44 – Coudersport, Shinglehouse	Western terminus
Genesee Township	16.372	26.348	PA 449 (Main Street) – Galeton, Wellsville	
Genesee Township	17.191	27.666	NY 248A north – Whitesville	New York state line; eastern terminus
1.000 mi = 1.609 km; 1.000 km = 0.621 mi
