= New York State Route 19 =

North–south state highway in New York state

New York State Route 19
- Map of New York with NY 19 highlighted in red

Route information
- Maintained by NYSDOT
- Length: 108.62 mi (174.81 km)
- Existed: 1930–present

Major junctions
- South end: PA 449 at the Pennsylvania state line in Willing
- I-86 / NY 17 near Belmont; NY 39 in Pike; US 20A in Warsaw; US 20 in Pavilion; I-490 near Bergen village; NY 31 near Brockport
- North end: Lake Ontario State Parkway in Hamlin

Location
- Country: United States
- State: New York
- Counties: Allegany, Wyoming, Genesee, Monroe

Highway system
- New York Highways; Interstate; US; State; Reference; Parkways
← NY 18F	→ NY 19A

New York State Route 19 (NY 19) is a north–south state highway in Western New York in the United States. It is the longest state highway in that region, and the only other one besides NY 14 to completely transect the state from the Pennsylvania state line to the shore of Lake Ontario. It continues south into Pennsylvania as Pennsylvania Route 449 (PA 449) and ends at an intersection with the Lake Ontario State Parkway just south of the lakeshore in Hamlin. NY 19 does not serve any major cities or metropolitan areas and remains a two-lane rural road for almost its entire length. However, it follows the Genesee River for much of its lower length, and offers easy access to the gorges of Letchworth State Park midway along its route.

Most of modern NY 19 between Wellsville and Le Roy was originally designated as part of a legislative route in 1908. Much of this stretch was included in Route 16, an unsigned highway that initially extended from Cuba to Le Roy via Belfast. In 1921, Route 16 was altered to follow the path of what is now NY 19A instead. The first set of posted routes in New York were assigned in 1924, at which time the Wellsville–Belvidere segment of modern NY 19 was designated as part of NY 17 and a small portion of NY 19 in Brockport became part of NY 3. Within two years, the pre-1921 routing of legislative Route 16 from Belfast to Pavilion was designated as part of New York State Route 62, a new route that began at Belvidere and passed through Pavilion before following modern NY 63 northwest to the Lake Ontario shoreline north of Lyndonville.

In the 1930 renumbering of state highways in New York, NY 17 was altered to follow a more southerly routing between Olean and Wellsville while NY 62 became the basis for NY 19, which continued south of Belvidere to the Pennsylvania state line. The portion of what is now NY 19 north of Pavilion was initially part of NY 63; the alignments of NY 19 and NY 63 were flipped north of Pavilion c. 1939. Only minor realignments and maintenance transfers have occurred since.

== Route description ==
Allegany County accounts for about a third of NY 19's total length, with the other three counties splitting the rest about equally.

=== Allegany County ===
PA 449 becomes NY 19 just north of Genesee, Pennsylvania, as it runs along the Genesee River through a narrow valley. Just south of the first New York community it encounters, the hamlet of Shongo in the Town of Willing, it crosses the river. Running a little farther from the waterway, NY 19 reaches another hamlet, Stannards, several miles (kilometers) farther north, along with its first state highway junction, NY 248, which leaves to the east.

After Stannards, NY 19 crosses Chenunda Creek as the Genesee Valley widens somewhat, and continues north to the village of Wellsville, the largest community in Allegany County. It merges with NY 417, the east–west former route of NY 17 through the village, following a four-lane arterial along the Genesee River, which here runs through a concrete-lined flood control channel. North of Wellsville, the NY 19 corridor remains fairly well-developed as the highway makes its way to the smaller village of Belmont, the county seat. Here NY 19 crosses the Genesee River for the last time, and NY 244 leaves for Alfred to the east at the village center.

1 mile (1.6 km) past Belmont, NY 19 has its only direct freeway interchange, with the Southern Tier Expressway (Interstate 86 or I-86 and NY 17). Beyond it, it follows the river closely through the hamlet of Belfast, where NY 305 terminates. The next junction with another state highway, NY 243, comes at Caneadea, the next hamlet. It continues northward, passing through Houghton, home to Houghton College. NY 19A splits off in Fillmore to continue the riverside course and provide access to Letchworth State Park, while NY 19 climbs out of the valley and out of Allegany County.

=== Wyoming County ===
After the short bend where it crosses the Wyoming County line, NY 19 bends slightly to the west as it comes into the hamlet of Pike 1 mile (1.6 km) to the north. The hamlet itself does not present any major intersections; however, NY 19 meets NY 39, the main east–west road across southern Wyoming County, northeast of the hamlet. The two routes overlap for just over 0.5 miles (0.8 km) before NY 19 turns back to the north and heads across mostly open fields to the next village, Gainesville, a few miles (kilometers) farther on. Again the intersecting state highway is displaced to the north of the village, where NY 78 heads off to the west despite being signed as a north–south route.

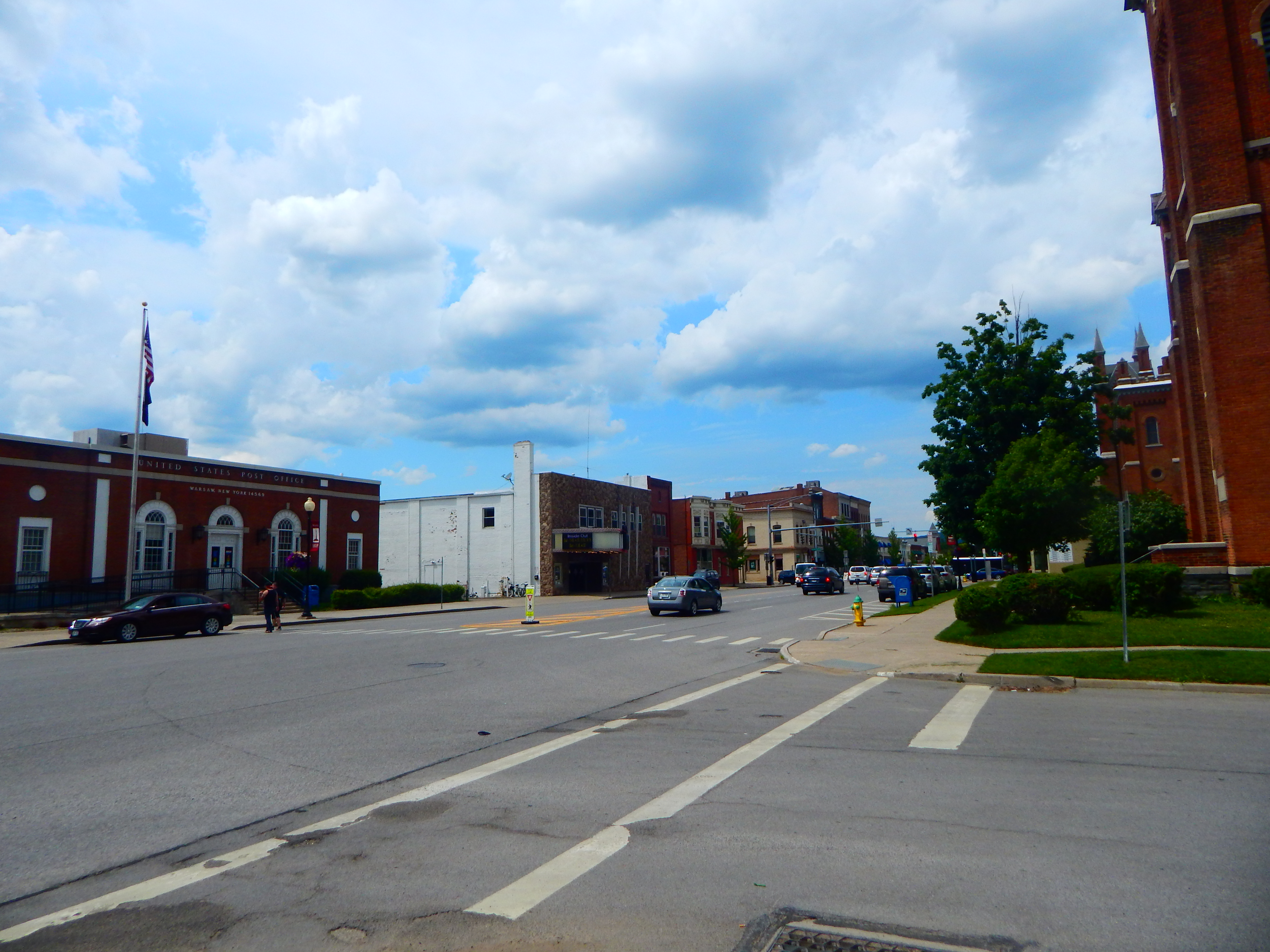
NY 19 through Warsaw

The route heads northeast from Gainesville to the hamlet of Rock Glen outside of Silver Springs, where NY 19A returns to its parent route and NY 19 passes under the Norfolk Southern Railway-owned Southern Tier Line. A few miles (kilometers) farther on, NY 19 reaches another county seat, Warsaw. The highway, along with the intersecting U.S. Route 20A (US 20A), serves as one of the village's two commercial axis. Upon leaving Warsaw to the north, NY 19, having trended slightly to the west since the state line, reaches its apex and begins to go slightly to the northeast for the remainder of the route. It begins this new course while running through the Wyoming Valley, formed by Oatka Creek, a tributary of the Genesee River. At the Middlebury–Covington town line, NY 19 takes a sudden right turn from its route to follow Schwytzer–East Bethany Road for 3 miles (4.8 km) to Silver Lake Road, where it once again assumes a due north heading as it begins to parallel the Rochester and Southern Railroad and enters Genesee County.

=== Genesee and Monroe counties ===
Almost immediately after the county line NY 19 intersects NY 63 at a traffic light in the hamlet of Pavilion. The similarly named but smaller Pavilion Center 2 miles (3.2 km) to the north marks the junction—a pseudo-parclo interchange—with US 20.

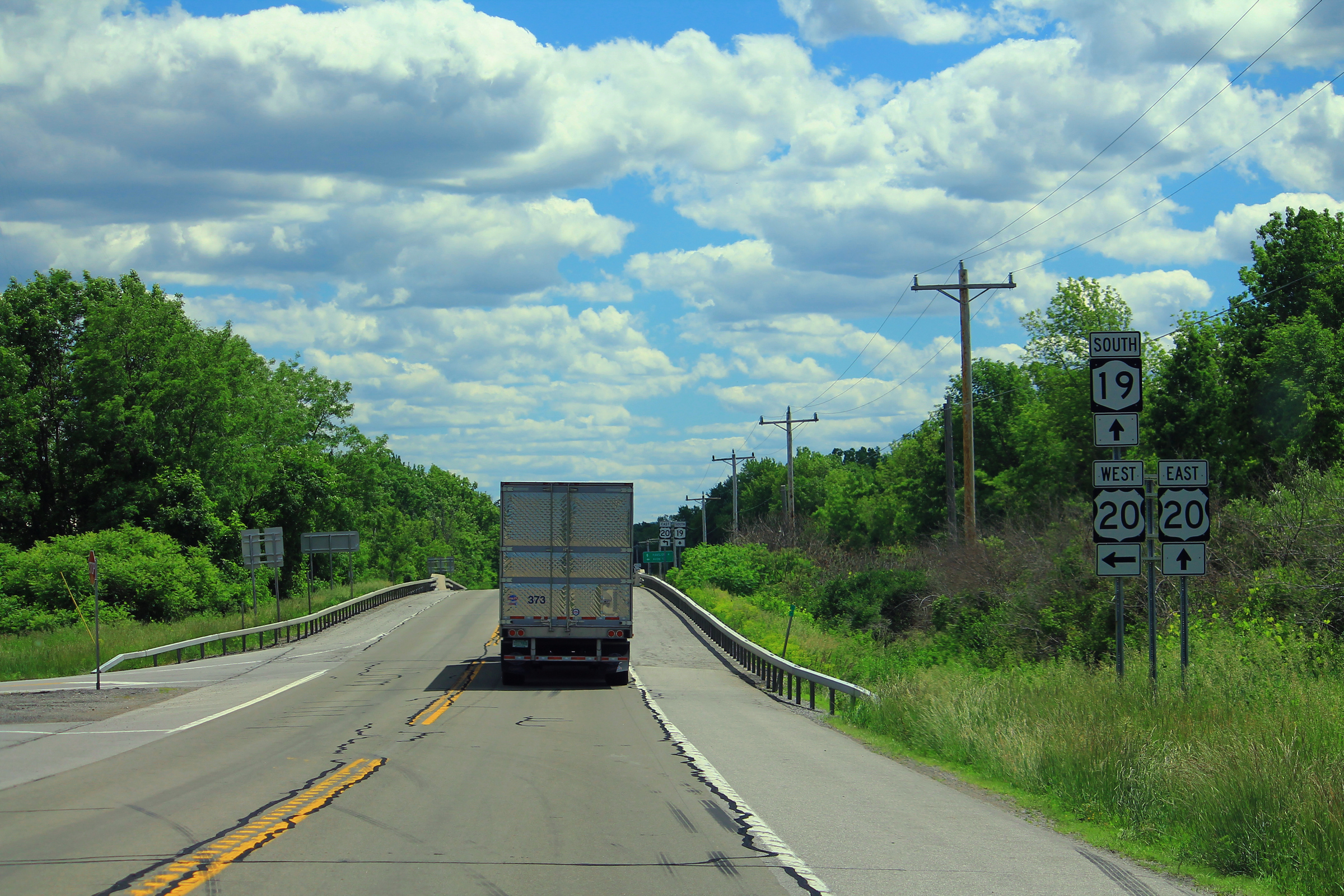
NY 19 at the US 20 interchange

NY 19 follows the Rochester and Southern Railroad into the village of Le Roy, where NY 19 intersects the state's other major east–west route, NY 5, and crosses the railroad as it turns eastward to access Caledonia. Outside of Le Roy, the route begins to leave Oatka Creek behind as the river and the route both descend the Onondaga Escarpment. Shortly afterwards, it crosses the I-90 segment of the New York State Thruway just west of where I-490 leaves the Thruway. While NY 19 is signed for this exit along the Thruway, access to it comes via the first exit on I-490, which is accessed via connector roads as the two highways do not directly intersect.

North of the Thruway, NY 19 enters the village of Bergen, intersecting NY 33 south of the village and NY 262 in the community itself. After passing the historic buildings of Lake Street, it crosses the CSX Transportation-owned Rochester Subdivision before exiting the village limits. Several miles (kilometers) later, after passing the Bergen Swamp Wildlife Refuge and crossing over Black Creek, it crosses its last county line, entering the rural southwestern corner of Monroe County. The route heads north through the lightly populated town of Sweden to a large commercial district located a short distance south of the southern boundary of Brockport, the largest community on NY 19's entire length. Here, NY 19, named South Lake Road, intersects NY 31, which enters from the west as Fourth Section Road and leaves to the east as Brockport–Spencerport Road.

NY 19 continues north into Brockport, where the road crosses the Erie Canal and passes SUNY Brockport and the Morgan–Manning House as Main Street. Less than 1 mile (1.6 km) northeast of the village, NY 19 reaches NY 104 (Ridge Road) at the hamlet of Clarkson Corners. Now known as North Lake Road, and eventually just Lake Road, NY 19 assumes a straight course again through the several miles (kilometers) of open country to its next junction, NY 18 at Hamlin. Just north of the quiet hamlet, Lake Road splits into east and west branches at a fork in the road. While unsigned CR 234 (former NY 360) branches off to the northwest on the west fork, NY 19 takes the east fork and heads northeast from the hamlet. A few miles (kilometers) more brings the route to North Hamlin and finally its northern terminus at the Lake Ontario State Parkway. Lake Road East Fork, at this point no longer part of NY 19, continues across the parkway to serve two Lake Ontario beach communities.

== History ==
In 1908, the New York State Legislature established a statewide legislative route system that initially consisted of 37 unsigned routes. The system included three segments of what is now NY 19, two of which were located south of Le Roy. The longest of the three pieces extended from modern NY 305 in Belfast to NY 5 in Le Roy and comprised most of Route 16, which also continued southwest along current NY 305 to Cuba. Two smaller segments, from the southeastern end of the overlap with current NY 417 in Wellsville to County Route 20 (CR 20) in Belvidere and from what is now NY 31 south of Brockport to West Avenue in the village, became part of Route 4 and Route 30, respectively. On March 1, 1921, several routes were added, removed, or modified as part of a partial renumbering of New York's legislative route system. The portion of Route 30 between Medina and Rochester became part of an extended Route 20 while Route 16 was realigned to follow modern NY 19A between Fillmore and Gainesville. Lastly, the portion of modern NY 19 between NY 417 and NY 248 at Stannards was included in the new Route 46.

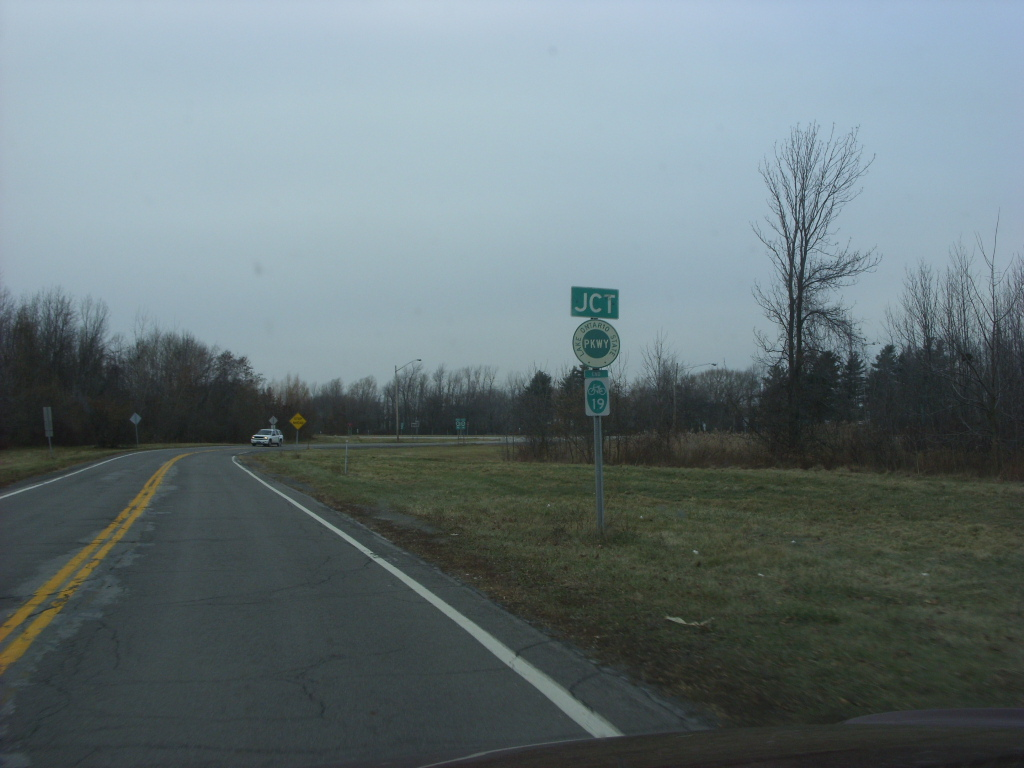
Approaching the north end of NY 19 at the Lake Ontario State Parkway in Hamlin

When the first set of posted routes in New York were assigned in 1924, the pieces of Route 4 between Belvidere and Wellsville and Route 20 along Main Street in Brockport were designated as part of NY 17 and NY 3, respectively. By 1926, the pre-1921 routing of Route 16 between Belfast and Pavilion was designated as part of NY 62, a route that continued south along modern NY 19 to Belvidere and northwest to the Lake Ontario shoreline by way of what is now NY 63. In the 1930 renumbering of state highways in New York, NY 17 was realigned between Olean and Wellsville to follow a new, more southerly routing while NY 62 became part of NY 19, a new route that extended from the Pennsylvania state line to Lake Ontario by way of former NY 62, NY 17's former routing from Wellsville to Belvidere, the segment of legislative Route 46 north of Stannards, and a previously unnumbered highway between Stannards and the Pennsylvania border. At the same time, the portion of legislative Route 16 between Pavilion and Le Roy became part of NY 63, which extended north to the lakeshore in Hamlin by way of what is now NY 19. The alignments of NY 19 and NY 63 north of Pavilion were flipped c. 1939.

Within the village of Wellsville, NY 19 and NY 417 (formerly NY 17) were originally routed on North and South Main streets. In the early 1970s, construction began on an arterial bypassing downtown Wellsville to the west. It was opened to traffic as part of a realigned NY 19 and NY 417 in October 1977. In Hamlin, the segment of NY 19 between North Hamlin Road and the Lake Ontario State Parkway was originally maintained by Monroe County as the unsigned CR 232. In 2007, ownership and maintenance of that segment of NY 19 was transferred from Monroe County to the state of New York as part of a highway maintenance swap between the two levels of government. A bill (S4856, 2007) to enact the swap was introduced in the New York State Senate on April 23 and passed by both the Senate and the New York State Assembly on June 20. The act was signed into law by Governor Eliot Spitzer on August 28. Under the terms of the act, it took effect 90 days after it was signed into law; thus, the maintenance swap officially took place on November 26, 2007.

== NY 19A ==

NY 19A (19.06 miles or 30.67 kilometres) is an eastern alternate to NY 19 between Fillmore and Rock Glen, connecting to Silver Springs, Castile and Portageville. It was assigned as part of the 1930 renumbering of state highways in New York.

== NY 19 Truck ==
NY 19 has had two short truck routes, one in the village of Belmont and another circumventing the village of Brockport.

=== Brockport ===
New York State Route 19 Truck
- Location: Brockport
- Length: 4.23 mi (6.81 km)

NY 19 Truck in Brockport is a route that serves as a bypass around a low bridge carrying the Falls Road Railroad over NY 19 in the village. It begins at the intersection of NY 31 and NY 19 south of Brockport and follows NY 31 westward on Fourth Section Road and northward on Redman Road to West Avenue. At West Avenue, NY 19 Truck splits from NY 31 and travels east on West Avenue to rejoin NY 19 north of the village.

The West Avenue leg of NY 19 Truck was originally designated as part of NY 31. In the early 1980s, NY 31 was rerouted to bypass Brockport on Redman and Fourth Section roads. West Avenue was redesignated as NY 943B, an unsigned reference route. In 2007, ownership and maintenance of NY 943B was transferred from the state of New York to Monroe County as part of a highway maintenance swap between the two levels of government. A bill (S4856, 2007) to enact the swap was introduced in the New York State Senate on April 23 and passed by both the Senate and the New York State Assembly on June 20. The act was signed into law by Governor Eliot Spitzer on August 28. Under the terms of the act, it took effect 90 days after it was signed into law; thus, the maintenance swap officially took place on November 26, 2007. The former routing of NY 943B is now designated as the unsigned CR 281.

=== Belmont ===
New York State Route 19 Truck
- Location: Belmont
- Length: 0.5 mi (800 m)
- Existed: ???–October 22, 2009

NY 19 Truck in Belmont was a route that served as bypass around a bridge over the Genesee River on NY 19. The route began at the junction of Willetts Avenue (NY 19) and Genesee Street (NY 244) and followed Genesee Street northeastward across the Genesee River to Greenwich Street in the northern portion of the village. Here, NY 19 Truck split from NY 244 and turned southeastward, following Greenwich Street back to NY 19 east of the village center. The bypassed bridge was originally built in 1935 and had an operating rating of 10 metric tons (11 short tons) and a sufficiency rating of 3%. In late 2008, work began on a new bridge to replace the existing structure on NY 19. The new bridge cost $4.5 million and was opened to traffic on October 22, 2009. Signage for NY 19 Truck was removed following the completion of the project.

== Major intersections ==
County	Location	mi	km	Destinations	Notes
Allegany	Willing	0.00	0.00	PA 449 south (North Genesee Street) – Genesee	Continuation into Pennsylvania
Allegany	Willing	6.74	10.85	NY 248 east (Hallsport Road) – Hallsport, Whitesville	Western terminus of NY 248; hamlet of Stannards
Allegany	Village of Wellsville	9.08	14.61	NY 417 east – Andover	Eastern terminus of NY 417 overlap
Allegany	Village of Wellsville	10.54	16.96	NY 417 west (Bolivar Road) – Bolivar	Western terminus of NY 417 overlap
Allegany	Belmont	19.45	31.30	NY 244 east (Genesee Street) – Alfred	Western terminus of NY 244
Allegany	Amity–Angelica line	22.37	36.00	I-86 / NY 17 – Jamestown, Binghamton	Exit 30 on I-86
Allegany	Belfast	28.23	45.43	NY 305 south	Northern terminus of NY 305
Allegany	Caneadea	33.36	53.69	NY 243 west – Rushford Lake, Rushford, Buffalo	Eastern terminus of NY 243
Allegany	Hume	40.31	64.87	NY 19A north (North Genesee Street) – Letchworth State Park	Southern terminus of NY 19A; hamlet of Fillmore
Wyoming	Town of Pike	48.90	78.70	NY 39 west – Bliss	Southern terminus of NY 39 overlap; hamlet of Pike
Wyoming	Town of Pike	49.51	79.68	NY 39 east – Castile	Northern terminus of NY 39 overlap
Wyoming	Town of Gainesville	55.07	88.63	NY 78 north (Delhi Road) – Java Center	Southern terminus of NY 78
Wyoming	Town of Gainesville	56.59	91.07	NY 19A south – Silver Springs	Northern terminus of NY 19A
Wyoming	Village of Warsaw	61.58	99.10	US 20A (Buffalo Street)	
Genesee	Town of Pavilion	73.95	119.01	NY 63 (Ellicott Street Road / Big Tree Road) – Batavia, Geneseo	Hamlet of Pavilion
Genesee	Town of Pavilion	76.29	122.78	US 20 (Telephone Road) – Buffalo, Avon	Interchange; hamlet of Pavilion Center
Genesee	Village of Le Roy	81.45	131.08	NY 5 (Main Street)	
Genesee	Town of Le Roy	85.70	137.92	I-490 to I-90 Toll / New York Thruway – Rochester, Albany, Buffalo	Exit 1 on I-490; I-490 west not signed
Genesee	Village of Bergen	88.64	142.65	NY 33 (Clinton Street Road) to I-490 – Batavia, Rochester	
Genesee	Village of Bergen	88.96	143.17	NY 262 west (Townline Road)	Eastern terminus of NY 262
Monroe	Sweden	97.53	156.96	NY 31 (4th Section Road / Brockport Spencerport Road) – Clarendon, Spencerport	
Monroe	Town of Clarkson	100.08	161.06	NY 104 (West Ridge Road)	Hamlet of Clarkson
Monroe	Town of Hamlin	104.44	168.08	NY 18 (Roosevelt Highway)	
Monroe	Town of Hamlin	105.25	169.38	Lake Road West Fork (CR 234)	Former NY 360; hamlet of Hamlin
Monroe	Town of Hamlin	108.62	174.81	Lake Ontario State Parkway	Northern terminus; hamlet of Sandy Harbour
1.000 mi = 1.609 km; 1.000 km = 0.621 mi: Concurrency terminus

== See also ==
- New York State Bicycle Route 19
- List of county routes in Monroe County, New York
