= Stannards, New York =

- Census-designated place
- Location within the state of New York Stannards (the United States)
- Coordinates: 42°5′0″N 77°55′21″W
- Country: United States
- State: New York
- County: Allegany
- Towns: Willing, Wellsville

Area
  - Total: 2.80 sq mi (7.25 km^{2})
  - Land: 2.80 sq mi (7.25 km^{2})
  - Water: 0 sq mi (0.00 km^{2})
- Elevation: 1,549 ft (472 m)

Population (2020)
  - Total: 585
  - Density: 209.1/sq mi (80.74/km^{2})
- Time zone: UTC-5 (Eastern (EST))
  - Summer (DST): UTC-4 (EDT)
- ZIP Code: 14895 (Wellsville)
- FIPS code: 36-70717
- GNIS feature ID: 0966225

Stannards is a hamlet (and census-designated place) located in the towns of Willing and Wellsville in Allegany County, New York, United States. As of the 2020 census, Stannards had a population of 585. The hamlet is named after early resident John Stannard.

== History ==
The hamlet was originally called "Stannards Corners". John Stannard built the first hotel in this community. The hotel was later owned by Clark Hayes, whose son, film star George "Gabby" Hayes was born in it.

== Geography ==
Stannards is located on the boundary between the towns of Willing and Wellsville. Its center is located at 42°5′0″N 77°55′21″W (42.083345, -77.922434).

According to the United States Census Bureau, the CDP has a total area of 2.80 square miles (7.24 km^{2}), all land.

The Genesee River flows northward through the town. North of the hamlet, Chenunda Creek joins the river from the east.

The hamlet is located on New York Routes 19, a major north–south trunk road, and 248, a local east–west trunk road.

== Demographics ==
Historical population
Census	Pop.	Note	%±
2020	585		—
U.S. Decennial Census

As of the census of 2000, there were 868 people, 375 households, and 260 families residing in the community. The population density was 305.1 inhabitants per square mile (117.8/km^{2}). There were 436 housing units at an average density of 153.3 per square mile (59.2/km^{2}). The racial makeup of the CDP was 98.50% White, 0.35% Native American, 0.35% Asian, 0.23% from other races, and 0.58% from two or more races. Hispanic or Latino of any race were 0.46% of the population.

There were 375 households, out of which 27.5% had children under the age of 18 living with them, 51.7% were married couples living together, 11.7% had a female householder with no husband present, and 30.4% were non-families. 26.7% of all households were made up of individuals, and 12.0% had someone living alone who was 65 years of age or older. The average household size was 2.31 and the average family size was 2.72.

In the hamlet the population was spread out, with 23.2% under the age of 18, 8.4% from 18 to 24, 22.2% from 25 to 44, 29.4% from 45 to 64, and 16.8% who were 65 years of age or older. The median age was 42 years. For every 100 females, there were 100.0 males. For every 100 females age 18 and over, there were 97.9 males.

The median income for a household in the hamlet was $37,344, and the median income for a family was $46,136. Males had a median income of $41,000 versus $20,865 for females. The per capita income for the area was $18,575. About 5.4% of families and 10.7% of the population were below the poverty line, including 9.2% of those under age 18 and 4.3% of those age 65 or over.

== Notable person ==
- Gabby Hayes, American radio, film, and television actor
