= New York State Route 244 =

State highway in Allegany County, New York, US

New York State Route 244
- Map of Allegany County in the Southern Tier of New York with NY 244 highlighted in red

Route information
- Maintained by NYSDOT
- Length: 15.80 mi (25.43 km)
- Existed: 1930–present

Major junctions
- West end: NY 19 in Belmont
- East end: NY 21 in Alfred

Location
- Country: United States
- State: New York
- Counties: Allegany

Highway system
- New York Highways; Interstate; US; State; Reference; Parkways
← NY 243	→ NY 245

New York State Route 244 (NY 244) is an east–west state highway in Allegany County, New York, in the United States. It runs for 15.80 miles (25.43 km) from an intersection with NY 19 in the village of Belmont to a junction with NY 21 in the town of Alfred. The highway is located about 3 miles (4.8 km) south of the Southern Tier Expressway (Interstate 86 or I-86 and NY 17), which loosely parallels NY 244 between Belmont and Alfred. NY 244 was assigned as part of the 1930 renumbering of state highways in New York.

== Route description ==
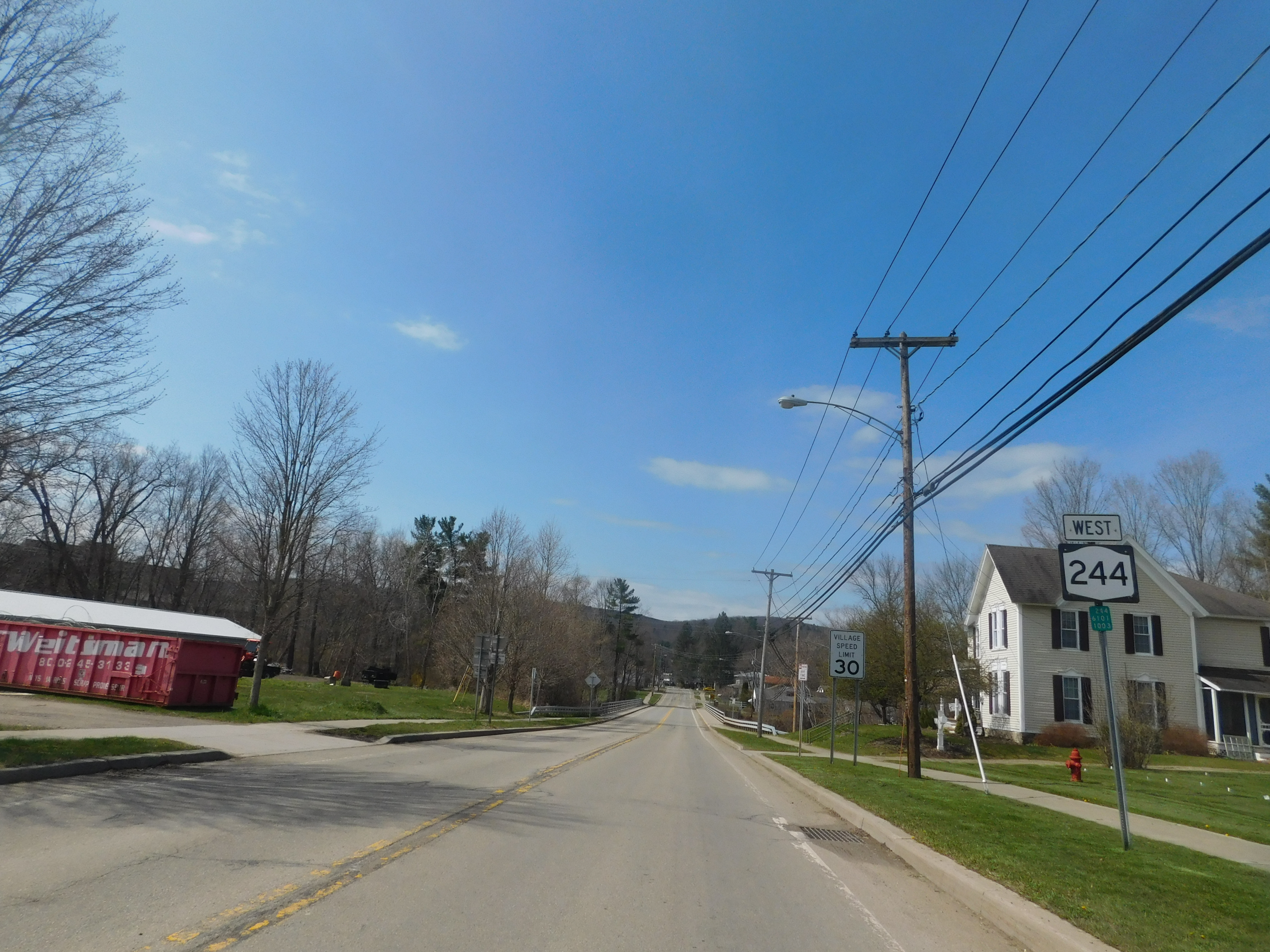
NY 244 westbound entering Belmont

NY 244 begins at an intersection with NY 19 in the village of Belmont, located 3 miles (4.8 km) southeast of the Southern Tier Expressway (Interstate 86 or I-86 and NY 17) in the town of Amity. The route heads northeast on the two-lane Genesee Street, serving several blocks of homes as it crosses the Western New York and Pennsylvania Railroad at-grade and passes over the Genesee River. On the opposite bank, NY 244 changes names to Milton Street at an intersection with the south end of County Route 48 (CR 48, named Triana Street). From here, the route continues northeastward out of the village and into less developed areas of Amity. Outside the village limits, the route becomes Mainville Road and runs mostly parallel to Phillips Creek, following it northeast and eastward through a lightly populated valley. The highway meets the southern terminus of CR 2B (Baker Valley Road) on its way into the town of Ward, where NY 244 loses the Mainville Road name and the creek ends in the hamlet of Phillips Creek.

East of Phillips Creek, NY 244 proceeds across hilly, rural terrain to the town of Alfred, where the highway crosses CR 10 (Vandermark Road) and CR 11 (McHenry Valley Road) at a junction just east of the town line. Another rugged and undeveloped stretch brings the route into the village of Alfred, a college town home to Alfred University and Alfred State College. NY 244 bypasses most of the village; instead, it connects to downtown by way of North Main Street, here designated but not signed as NY 960B. Outside of the village, NY 244 continues through the town of Alfred and heads along the base of a narrow, lightly populated valley surrounding Canacadea Creek to Alfred Station, where it ends at a junction with NY 21. The intersection is just over 3 miles (4.8 km) south of the village of Almond, where NY 21 connects to the Southern Tier Expressway.

== History ==
The Belmont–Alfred Station road was acquired by the state of New York in stages over the course of the early 20th century. In the town of Amity, the highway was improved under a contract awarded by the state on March 22, 1921. The ensuing project cost $161,802 to complete (equivalent to $5.4 million in 2025), and the rebuilt road was added to the state highway system on January 14, 1922, as unsigned State Highway 1559 (SH 1559). The part east of Alfred was reconstructed in the mid-1920s as part of a project to connect the Alfred village center and Alfred Station by way of a state road. It was inventoried by the state as SH 1654. In the 1930 renumbering of state highways in New York, SH 1559 and SH 1654 became part of NY 244, a new route extending from Belmont to Alfred Station. In between the two state-owned segments, NY 244 followed an unimproved road through the towns of Ward and Alfred. This segment was rebuilt by the state in the early 1930s. This section became officially part of NY 242 in September 1932.

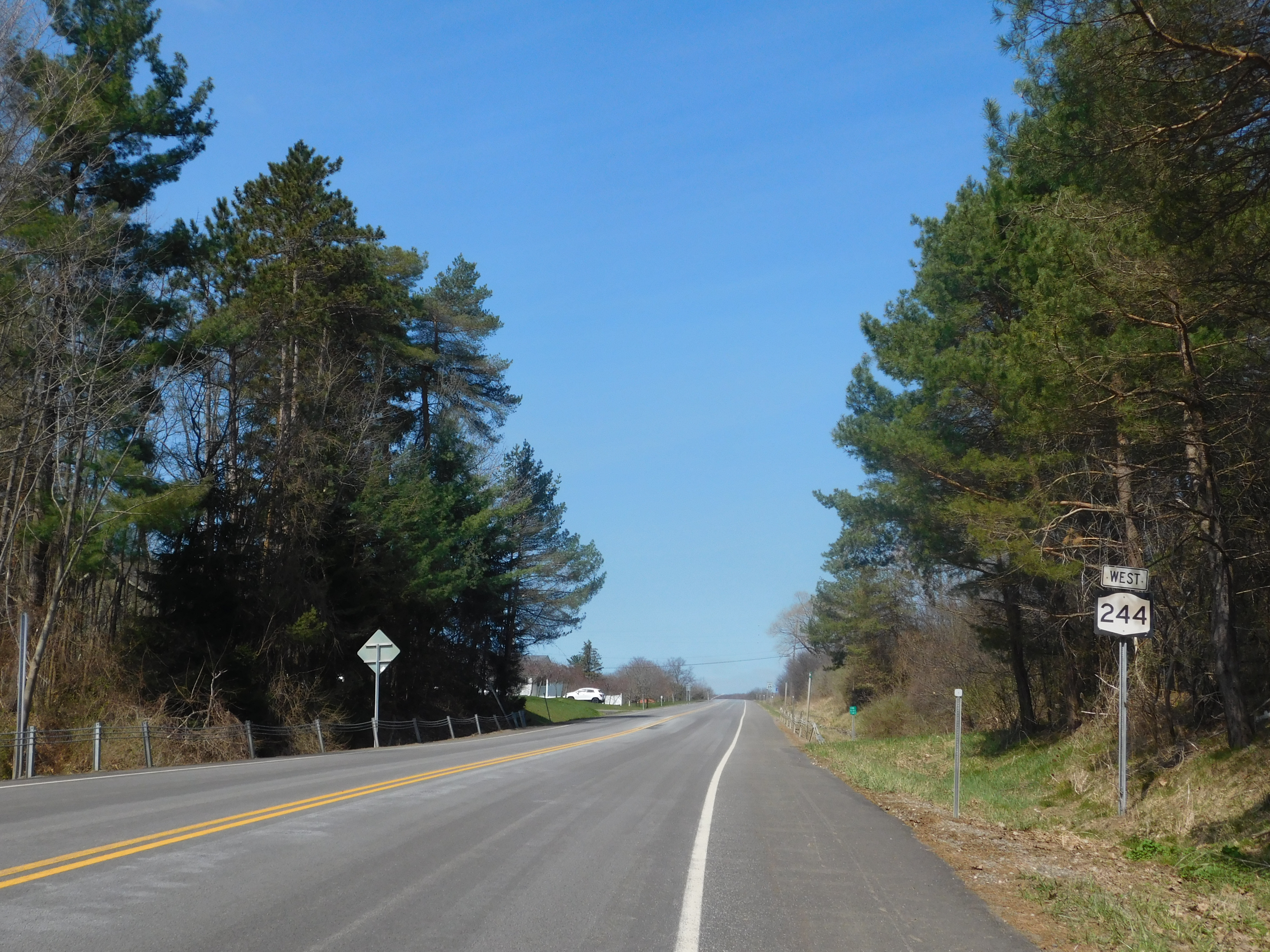
NY 244 westbound in Alfred

In 1964, the New York State Department of Public Works proposed trading over 80 miles (130 km) of roads that were not managing 1,000 or more cars daily for the construction of 30 miles (48 km) of the Southern Tier Expressway (NY 17). This list of proposed transfers included NY 244, NY 248 and its spur, NY 248A in their entirety, NY 275 and sections of NY 408, NY 70 and NY 19. In August 1964, the county declined to sign the offer.

== Major intersections ==
The entire route is in Allegany County.

Location	mi	km	Destinations	Notes
Belmont	0.00	0.00	NY 19 – Wellsville, Belfast	Western terminus
Village of Alfred	14.18	22.82	NY 960B (North Main Street)	Serves Alfred University and SUNY Alfred
Town of Alfred	15.48	24.91	NY 961G (Hamilton Hill Road) to NY 21 south	Western terminus of unsigned NY 961G; hamlet of Alfred Station
Town of Alfred	15.80	25.43	NY 21 to I-86 – Hornell, Andover	Eastern terminus
1.000 mi = 1.609 km; 1.000 km = 0.621 mi
