= Willing, New York =

- Town
- Location within New York Location within the United States
- Coordinates: 42°3′13″N 77°53′50″W
- Country: United States
- State: New York
- County: Allegany

Government
  - Type: Town Council
  - Town Supervisor: Ronald Wightman (R)
  - Town Council: Members' List: • Lester R. Fanton (R); • Gary Fanton (R); • Mark Wiedemann (R); • Roy Gay (R)

Area
  - Total: 36.27 sq mi (93.94 km^{2})
  - Land: 36.24 sq mi (93.86 km^{2})
  - Water: 0.031 sq mi (0.08 km^{2})
- Elevation: 1,995 ft (608 m)

Population (2020)
  - Total: 1,295 ▲
  - Estimate (2021): 1,280
  - Density: 33/sq mi (12.6/km^{2})
- Time zone: UTC-5 (Eastern (EST))
  - Summer (DST): UTC-4 (EDT)
- ZIP Codes: 14895 (Wellsville); 14897 (Whitesville)
- FIPS code: 36-003-82095
- GNIS feature ID: 0979642
- Website: willingny.org

Willing is a town in Allegany County, New York, United States. The population was 1,295 at the 2020 census. The town is on the southern border of the county, south of the village of Wellsville.

== History ==
The area that would become the town was first settled around 1819. The town of Willing was formed in 1852 from the towns of Independence and Scio.

In 1875, the population of Willing was 1,713. In the fall of 1884, a destructive tornado killed several people and destroyed property.

== Geography ==
According to the United States Census Bureau, the town has a total area of 36.3 square miles (93.9 km^{2}), of which 0.03 square miles (0.08 km^{2}), or 0.08%, is water.

The Genesee River flows northward through the town. The south town line is the border of Pennsylvania (Potter County).

New York State Route 19 is a major north–south highway, and New York State Route 248 is a major east–west highway. New York State Route 248A, Cryder Creek Road, passes through the southeast corner of the town.

== Demographics ==
Historical population
Census	Pop.	Note	%±
1860	1,238		—
1870	1,199		−3.2%
1880	1,267		5.7%
1890	1,206		−4.8%
1900	1,246		3.3%
1910	993		−20.3%
1920	755		−24.0%
1930	820		8.6%
1940	836		2.0%
1950	1,089		30.3%
1960	1,208		10.9%
1970	1,296		7.3%
1980	1,451		12.0%
1990	1,428		−1.6%
2000	1,371		−4.0%
2010	1,228		−10.4%
2020	1,295		5.5%
2021 (est.)	1,280		−1.2%
U.S. Decennial Census

As of the census of 2000, there were 1,371 people, 538 households, and 411 families residing in the town. The population density was 37.8 inhabitants per square mile (14.6/km^{2}). There were 648 housing units at an average density of 17.9 per square mile (6.9/km^{2}). The racial makeup of the town was 98.18% White, 0.07% African American, 0.29% Native American, 0.58% Asian, 0.15% from other races, and 0.73% from two or more races. Hispanic or Latino of any race were 0.66% of the population.

There were 538 households, out of which 29.6% had children under the age of 18 living with them, 61.2% were married couples living together, 9.7% had a female householder with no husband present, and 23.6% were non-families. 20.3% of all households were made up of individuals, and 10.4% had someone living alone who was 65 years of age or older. The average household size was 2.55 and the average family size was 2.90.

In the town, the population was spread out, with 24.8% under the age of 18, 6.3% from 18 to 24, 23.6% from 25 to 44, 28.0% from 45 to 64, and 17.3% who were 65 years of age or older. The median age was 42 years. For every 100 females, there were 100.4 males. For every 100 females age 18 and over, there were 99.0 males.

The median income for a household in the town was $35,859, and the median income for a family was $39,737. Males had a median income of $34,375 versus $19,917 for females. The per capita income for the town was $16,109. About 9.8% of families and 14.9% of the population were below the poverty line, including 18.6% of those under age 18 and 12.8% of those age 65 or over.

== Communities and locations in the Town of Willing ==
- Hallsport – A hamlet on Route 248 by Chenunda Creek in the northeast corner of the town.
- Mapes – A location by County Road 29 near the western town line.
- Paynesville – A location in the southeast corner of the town on Route 248A.
- Shongo – A hamlet on Route 19 near the south town line by the Genesee River. The name is that of a Seneca chief.
- Stannards – A hamlet on the north town line.
- Stone Dam – A location in the southwest corner of the town on County Road 29.
- York Corners – A hamlet located at the junction of Route 19 and County Road 39, south of Stannards.
