= Independence, New York =

- Town
- Location within New York Location within the United States
- Coordinates: 42°3′12″N 77°47′9″W
- Country: United States
- State: New York
- County: Allegany

Government
  - Type: Town Council
  - Town Supervisor: Jeri Reichman (D)
  - Town Council: Members' List: • Trinity Cutler (D); • Donald Waters (D); • Jaime Lewis (D, R); • Kimberly Rounds Howe (D, R)

Area
  - Total: 34.49 sq mi (89.3 km^{2})
  - Land: 34.48 sq mi (89.3 km^{2})
  - Water: 0.01 sq mi (0.026 km^{2})
- Elevation: 2,165 ft (660 m)

Population (2020)
  - Total: 1,095 ▼
  - Estimate (2021): 1,088
  - Density: 33.5/sq mi (12.94/km^{2})
- Time zone: UTC-5 (Eastern (EST))
  - Summer (DST): UTC-4 (EDT)
- ZIP Codes: 14897 (Whitesville); 14806 (Andover); 14895 (Wellsville)
- FIPS code: 36-003-37297
- GNIS feature ID: 0979091
- Website: independenceny.org

Independence is a town in Allegany County, New York, United States. The population was 1,095 at the 2020 census. The town is in the southeast corner of Allegany County, southeast of the village of Wellsville.

== History ==
The first permanent settlement occurred in 1819 at Whitesville, although an attempt was made to settle the town in 1798. The town of Independence was formed in 1821 from part of the town of Alfred. Independence was reduced by the formation of the towns of Andover (1824) and Willing (1851). Historians have found no particular reason as to why the name Independence was chosen.

From November 16, 1896, through June 1936 Whitesville was served by the New York & Pennsylvania Railway (and predecessors) as part of its Canisteo to Ceres (via Greenwood, Genesee, Oswayo and Shinglehouse) main line. Following severe floods in July 1935 the railroad was partially out of service, and its abandonment in June 1936 was readily approved by the Interstate Commerce Commission which from an early date approved railroad abandonment to promote highway truck use. The loss of railroad service did much to accelerate economic decline of the Whitesville area.

== Geography ==
According to the United States Census Bureau, the town has a total area of 34.5 square miles (89 km^{2}), all land.

The southern town line forms a border with Pennsylvania and the eastern town line is the border with Steuben County.

New York State Route 248 is a major east–west highway in the town that intersects with New York State Route 248A (Cryder Creek Road) west of the community of Whitesville.

Cryder Creek is a stream flowing out the southwest of the town, and Chenunda Creek flows across the northern part of the town. Both creeks are tributaries of the Genesee River.

== Demographics ==
Historical population
Census	Pop.	Note	%±
1830	877		—
1840	1,440		64.2%
1850	1,701		18.1%
1860	1,199		−29.5%
1870	1,175		−2.0%
1880	1,186		0.9%
1890	1,249		5.3%
1900	1,280		2.5%
1910	1,202		−6.1%
1920	1,028		−14.5%
1930	1,056		2.7%
1940	1,110		5.1%
1950	1,053		−5.1%
1960	1,004		−4.7%
1970	1,031		2.7%
1980	1,138		10.4%
1990	1,026		−9.8%
2000	1,074		4.7%
2010	1,167		8.7%
2020	1,095		−6.2%
2021 (est.)	1,088		−0.6%
US Decennial Census

=== 2000 census ===
As of the 2000 United States census, there were 1,074 people, 400 households, and 301 families in the town. The population density was 31.1/sqmi (12.0/km^{2}). There were 487 housing units at an average density of 14.1/sqmi (5.45/km^{2}). The racial makeup of the town was 98.98% White, 0.37% African American, 0.09% Native American, 0.09% Asian, and 0.47% from two or more races. Hispanic or Latino of any race were 0.37% of the population.

There were 400 households, out of which 35.8% had children under the age of 18 living with them, 58.8% were married couples living together, 10.8% had a female householder with no husband present, and 24.8% were non-families. 20.3% of all households were made up of individuals, and 10.8% had someone living alone who was 65 years of age or older. The average household size was 2.69 and the average family size was 3.04.

The town population contained 27.5% under the age of 18, 9.3% from 18 to 24, 24.1% from 25 to 44, 24.5% from 45 to 64, and 14.6% who were 65 years of age or older. The median age was 38 years. For every 100 females, there were 102.6 males. For every 100 females age 18 and over, there were 96.2 males.

The median income for a household in the town was $33,438. Males had a median income of $27,961 versus $19,583 for females. The per capita income for the town was $13,109. About 11.0% of families and 13.3% of the population were below the poverty line, including 17.8% of those under age 18 and 8.0% of those age 65 or over.

== Communities and locations in the Town of Independence ==
- Independence – A hamlet at the intersection of County Road 22 and County Road 22A near the northern town line.
- Whitesville – A hamlet at routes NY 248 and NY 248A near the eastern town line. The community is named after Samuel S White, the first permanent resident in the town and founder of the hamlet.
- Spring Mills – A hamlet in the southeast corner near Spring Mills Creek.

== Sports ==
- Circle K Speedway was a 1/4-mile (0.40 km) dirt oval racing facility located near the hamlet of Whitesville. It operated from 1980 to 1986 by Don and Audrey Kio, and was where New York State Stock Car Association Hall of Fame driver Curt Van Pelt, like others known on the state and national scene, began his career. (Note: Geolocation of Circle K Speedway: 42.0365°N 77.7979°W)

== Notable person ==
- Mary Bassett Clarke (1831–1908), writer
