= Scio, New York =

- Town
- Location within New York Location within the United States
- Coordinates: 42°8′58″N 78°0′22″W
- Country: United States
- State: New York
- County: Allegany

Government
  - Type: Town council
  - Town supervisor: Daniel B. Fleming (R)
  - Town council: Members' list: • Marcia Habberfield (D, R); • Gloria Meiss (D, R); • Jack Kinney (D, R); • Ernest Ramsey (D, R)

Area
  - Total: 35.29 sq mi (91.41 km^{2})
  - Land: 35.25 sq mi (91.31 km^{2})
  - Water: 0.039 sq mi (0.10 km^{2})
- Elevation: 1,545 ft (471 m)

Population (2020)
  - Total: 1,625 ▼
  - Estimate (2021): 1,622
  - Density: 49.7/sq mi (19.19/km^{2})
- Time zone: UTC-5 (Eastern (EST))
  - Summer (DST): UTC-4 (EDT)
- ZIP Code: 14880 (Scio); 14707 (Allentown); 14895 (Wellsville)
- Area code: 585
- FIPS code: 36-003-65772
- GNIS feature ID: 0979475
- Website: townofsciony.org

Scio is a town in Allegany County, New York, United States. The population was 1,625 at the 2020 census. The town is in the southern half of the county and north of the village of Wellsville.

== History ==
The town was first settled in 1805 by Joseph Knight, a minuteman in the American Revolution, from Oneida County. Knights Creek, which flows into the Genesee River near Scio, is named for him. The town of Scio was created in 1823 from the town of Angelica. Some of its territory was later lost during the formation of the towns of Amity (1830), Wellsville (1855), and Willing (1851).

== Notable people ==
- Marine Corporal Jason Dunham, the second recipient of the Medal of Honor in Operation Iraqi Freedom, was born in Scio.
- Burton Millard, member of the Wisconsin State Assembly, was born in Scio.

== Geography ==
According to the United States Census Bureau, the town has a total area of 35.3 square miles (91.5 km^{2}), of which 35.3 square miles (91.4 km^{2}) is land and 0.039 square miles (0.1 km^{2}), or 0.11%, is water.

The Genesee River flows northward through the town. Knights Creek and Vandermark Creek flow into the river by Scio village.

New York State Route 19 is a major north-south highway passing through the town. Scio is located on the mainline of the Western New York and Pennsylvania Railroad.

== Demographics ==
Historical population
Census	Pop.	Note	%±
1830	602		—
1840	1,156		92.0%
1850	1,881		62.7%
1860	1,631		−13.3%
1870	1,652		1.3%
1880	1,555		−5.9%
1890	1,391		−10.5%
1900	1,281		−7.9%
1910	1,196		−6.6%
1920	1,062		−11.2%
1930	1,205		13.5%
1940	1,353		12.3%
1950	1,511		11.7%
1960	1,513		0.1%
1970	1,674		10.6%
1980	1,971		17.7%
1990	1,965		−0.3%
2000	1,914		−2.6%
2010	1,833		−4.2%
2020	1,625		−11.3%
2021 (est.)	1,622	▼	−0.2%
U.S. Decennial Census

As of the census of 2000, there were 1,914 people, 729 households, and 532 families residing in the town. The population density was 54.3 inhabitants per square mile (21.0/km^{2}). There were 894 housing units at an average density of 25.4 per square mile (9.8/km^{2}). The racial makeup of the town was 97.39% white, .26% African American, .42% Native American, .26% Asian, .05% Pacific Islander, .47% from other races, and 1.15% from two or more races. Hispanic or Latino of any race were .37% of the population.

There were 729 households, out of which 33.7% had children under the age of 18 living with them, 59.7% were married couples living together, 7.8% had a female householder with no husband present, and 26.9% were non-families. 19.8% of all households were made up of individuals, and 10.3% had someone living alone who was 65 years of age or older. The average household size was 2.61 and the average family size was 2.98.

In the town, the population was spread out, with 25.9% under the age of 18, 8.4% from 18 to 24, 27.3% from 25 to 44, 23.8% from 45 to 64, and 14.7% who were 65 years of age or older. The median age was 39 years. For every 100 females, there were 96.9 males. For every 100 females age 18 and over, there were 96.5 males.

The median income for a household in the town was $32,679, and the median income for a family was $38,250. Males had a median income of $30,242 versus $20,595 for females. The per capita income for the town was $14,472. About 11.5% of families and 14.6% of the population were below the poverty line, including 21% of those under age 18 and 8.3% of those age 65 or over.

== Communities and locations in the Town of Scio ==
- Knights Creek – A hamlet on County Road 9 near the south town line and the name of the stream by which it is located. It is named after early settlers of the town.
- Norton Summit – A location north of Petrolia on County Route 18.
- Petrolia – A hamlet on County Road 18 near the south town line.
- Scio – A hamlet (and census-designated place) at the junction of County Roads 9 (River Street) and 10 (Vandermark Road) and NY Route 19 near the north town line. The Genesee River passes by the hamlet.
