= Andover (village), New York =

Andover, New York
- Village
- Logo

- Location within the state of New York Andover (the United States) Andover (North America)
- Coordinates: 42°9′31″N 77°47′43″W
- Country: United States
- State: New York
- County: Allegany
- Town: Andover

Area
  - Total: 1.02 sq mi (2.63 km^{2})
  - Land: 1.00 sq mi (2.59 km^{2})
  - Water: 0.015 sq mi (0.04 km^{2})
- Elevation: 1,660 ft (506 m)

Population (2020)
  - Total: 890
  - Density: 889/sq mi (343.3/km^{2})
- Time zone: UTC-5 (Eastern (EST))
  - Summer (DST): UTC-4 (EDT)
- ZIP code: 14806
- Area code: 607
- FIPS code: 36-02143
- GNIS feature ID: 0942463
- Website: Village website

Andover is a village located in the town of Andover in Allegany County, New York, United States. The population was 1,042 at the 2010 census. The name is derived from Andover, Vermont.

The village of Andover is centrally located in the town and near the east county line.

== History ==
The community was first settled c. 1807 under the name "Bakerstown," and was officially separated from Independence, New York, into its own township in 1824. The population in 1875 was 850.

== Geography ==
Andover is located at 42°9′31″N 77°47′42″W (42.158631, -77.795181).

According to the United States Census Bureau, the village has a total area of 1.0 square mile (2.6 km^{2}), of which 0.015 square miles (0.04 km^{2}), or 1.50%, is water.

Dyke Creek, named after an early settler, flows through the village.

Andover is at the junction of New York State Route 21 (Main Street) and New York State Route 417.

Andover Pond is located in the northern part of the village.

== Demographics ==
Historical population
| Census | Pop. | Note | %± |
|---|---|---|---|
| 1840 | 150 | | — |
| 1850 | 500 | | 233.3% |
| 1860 | 374 | | −25.2% |
| 1880 | 794 | | — |
| 1900 | 954 | | — |
| 1910 | 1,136 | | 19.1% |
| 1920 | 1,132 | | −0.4% |
| 1930 | 1,241 | | 9.6% |
| 1940 | 1,290 | | 3.9% |
| 1950 | 1,351 | | 4.7% |
| 1960 | 1,247 | | −7.7% |
| 1970 | 1,214 | | −2.6% |
| 1980 | 1,120 | | −7.7% |
| 1990 | 1,125 | | 0.4% |
| 2000 | 1,073 | | −4.6% |
| 2010 | 1,042 | | −2.9% |
| 2020 | 890 | | −14.6% |
U.S. Decennial Census

As of the census of 2000, there were 1,073 people, 432 households, and 282 families residing in the village. The population density was 1,076.6 inhabitants per square mile (415.7/km^{2}). There were 462 housing units at an average density of 463.5 per square mile (179.0/km^{2}). The racial makeup of the village was 97.02% White, 0.19% Black or African American, 0.19% Native American, 0.56% Asian, 0.65% from other races, and 1.40% from two or more races. Hispanic or Latino of any race were 1.21% of the population.

There were 432 households, out of which 30.6% had children under the age of 18 living with them, 53.9% were married couples living together, 7.6% had a female householder with no husband present, and 34.7% were non-families. 29.4% of all households were made up of individuals, and 14.8% had someone living alone who was 65 years of age or older. The average household size was 2.48 and the average family size was 3.09.

In the village, the population was spread out, with 26.0% under the age of 18, 9.8% from 18 to 24, 24.2% from 25 to 44, 23.7% from 45 to 64, and 16.3% who were 65 years of age or older. The median age was 38 years. For every 100 females, there were 94.7 males. For every 100 females age 18 and over, there were 89.0 males.

The median income for a household in the village was $31,563, and the median income for a family was $38,125. Males had a median income of $30,417 versus $20,804 for females. The per capita income for the village was $17,766. About 7.3% of families and 12.0% of the population were below the poverty line, including 16.1% of those under age 18 and 3.0% of those age 65 or over.
