= Genesee, Pennsylvania =

- Unincorporated community Census designated place
- Location within Pennsylvania Location within the United States
- Coordinates: 41°59′20.4″N 77°51′54.0″W
- Country: United States
- State: Pennsylvania
- County: Potter
- Township: Genesee

Area
  - Total: 0.951 sq mi (2.46 km^{2})
  - Land: 0.951 sq mi (2.46 km^{2})
  - Water: 0.000 sq mi (0 km^{2})
- Elevation: 1,631 ft (497 m)
- Time zone: UTC-5 (EST)
  - Summer (DST): UTC-4 (EDT)
- ZIP code: 16923
- Area code: 814
- FIPS code: 42-28752
- GNIS feature ID: 2830794

Genesee is an unincorporated community and census designated place (CDP) in Genesee Township, Potter County, Pennsylvania.

== Demographics ==
Historical population
Census	Pop.	Note	%±

The United States Census Bureau defined Genesee as a census designated place (CDP) in the 2023 American Community Survey.
