= Wellsville (village), New York =

Wellsville, New York
- Village
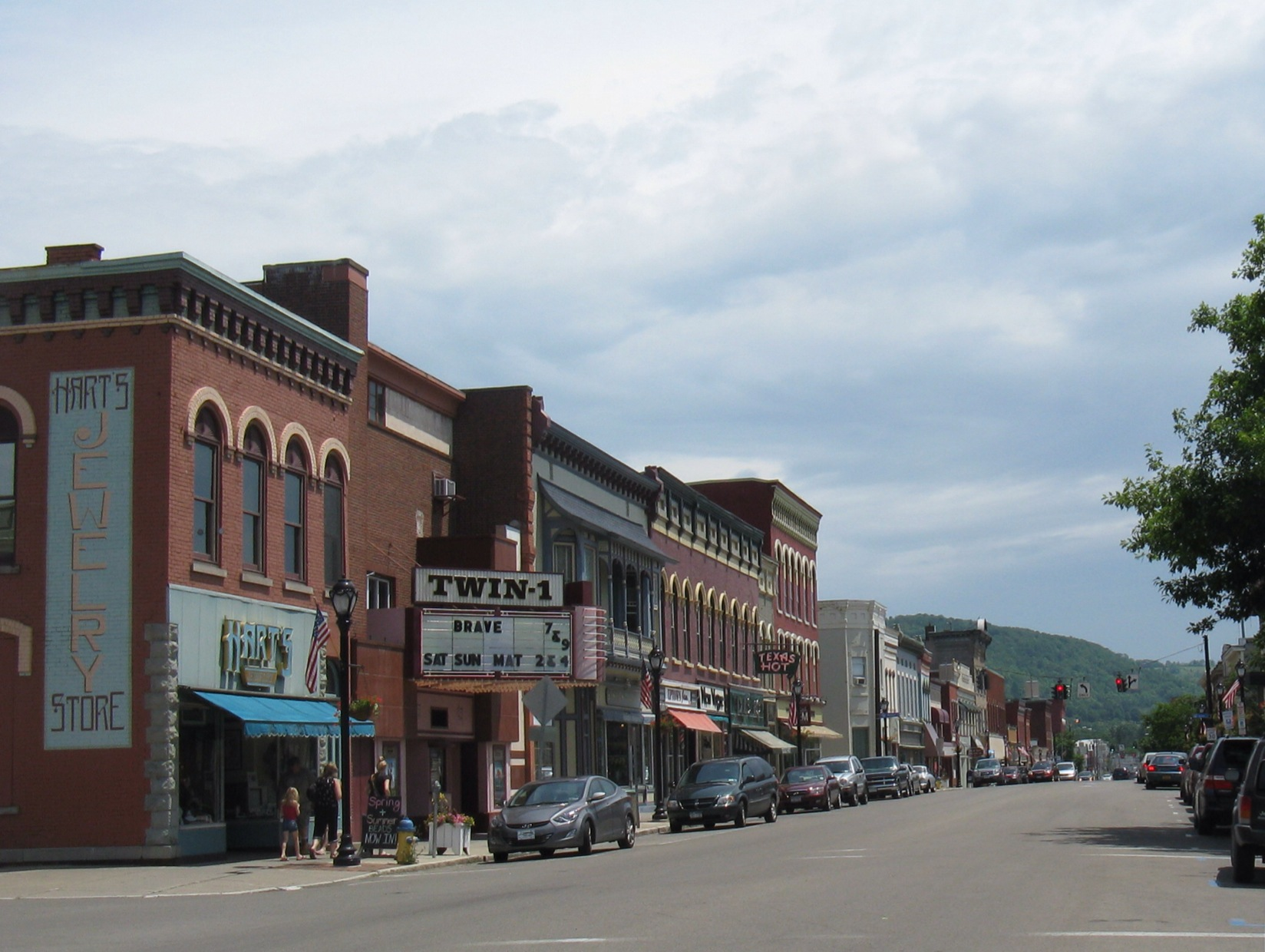
- Main Street

- Seal

- Location within the state of New York
- Coordinates: 42°7′18″N 77°56′49″W
- Country: United States
- State: New York
- County: Allegany
- Town: Wellsville

Area
  - Total: 2.42 sq mi (6.28 km^{2})
  - Land: 2.42 sq mi (6.28 km^{2})
  - Water: 0 sq mi (0.00 km^{2})
- Elevation: 1,512 ft (461 m)

Population (2020)
  - Total: 4,587
  - Density: 1,892.2/sq mi (730.58/km^{2})
- Time zone: UTC-5 (Eastern (EST))
  - Summer (DST): UTC-4 (EDT)
- ZIP code: 14895
- Area code: 585
- FIPS code: 36-79092
- GNIS feature ID: 969053
- Website: wellsvillevillageny.gov

Wellsville is a village in Allegany County, New York, United States. Located in south-central wooded and rural Allegany County, it is the largest population and business center in a 30-mile (48 km) radius. The population was 4,587 at the 2020 census. The village's name is not, as some suppose, derived from the oil wells that became an important economic part of the area, but rather for Gardiner Wells, a local businessman.

The village of Wellsville is circumscribed by the town of Wellsville, adding another approximately 3,000 people to the population (approx. 7,000 combined village and town). Alfred State College maintains a branch by the south end of the village. Wellsville Airport, Tarantine Field, located to the west of the village, provides general aviation and charter services.

== History ==
Wellsville was the location of encampments for thousands of years, including the Lamoka and Brewerton cultures. The latest native people, the Seneca, named Wellsville Gistaguat, according to a map produced in 1771 by Guy Johnson, as the official map of New York state at the time, for then-Governor William Tryon. The Seneca referred to the Wellsville area as "the Pigeon Woods" and held annual festivals and encampments there to take advantage of the passenger pigeon according to the memoirs of Captain Horatio Jones. At the time, passenger pigeons filled the skies by the millions, and the tribes and bands came to the Wellsville area from all over western New York and northern Pennsylvania to Gistaquat to harvest the pigeons by the thousands.

European settlers moved into the area before 1800. Nathaniel Dyke, a native of Connecticut, and a captain in the Revolutionary War, serving under both General George Washington and General Warren of Bunker Hill fame, was the first of these in Allegany County. He married a Native American woman (Esther) and moved his family to the Wellsville area by 1795, while it was still owned by the Seneca Nation (two years before the Big Tree Treaty of 1797). He began running a gristmill, a sawmill, and a tannery on a stream now known as Dyke's Creek, by 1803. Dyke is buried in Elm Valley, just east of town. His tombstone has the official memorial that was placed there by the Catherine Schuyler Chapter of the Daughters of the American Revolution.

The economy of Wellsville has changed dramatically in since its founding. Wellsville's first industry was tanning, utilizing the bark of the hemlock tree for its tannins. Wellsville was the site of three large tannery operations during the early 19th century. Next came the lumbermen and the railroad. The New York and Erie Railroad came through what would become Wellsville (then the outskirts of Scio) in 1851. That was the quickest way west from New York City, crossing New York state. This proved that Nathaniel Dyke's choice of location was the quickest, easiest and most practical way across Allegany County. The trains gave the lumbermen a new and more efficient means to get their product to market. Previous to this, the logs had been floated on the rivers and canals. Logging moved on to more densely forested areas in the latter part of the 19th century. The cleared ground quickly produced excellent grazing for a tremendous dairy industry which followed. Oil captured the economic center stage in the last two decades of the 19th century, and the Sinclair Refinery was built in Wellsville at the beginning of the 20th century, not closing down until 1957 after two major fires and falling oil prices.

As many wonder about this, Wellsville was not named for its oil "wells". Oil was not discovered in Wellsville until 1879 by O.P. Taylor in his famous "Triangle No. 1" well in Petrolia, west of Wellsville. The town was created as it split from Scio in 1856. The village of Wellsville was incorporated the following year, in 1857, 22 years before oil was discovered.

The area that is now Wellsville was part of Scio through the first half of the 19th century. It was incorporated as Wellsville and set apart from Scio in 1857. For a brief time during the early 1870s, Wellsville changed its name to "Genesee". On April 4, 1871, the New York State Legislature officially changed Wellsville's name to Genesee. After much political wrangling, by a special act of the legislature, the name Wellsville was again designated as the official name of the town, June 8, 1873. The village of Wellsville was first incorporated in 1857 and then again in 1873.

Eponymously, Wellsville was actually named for a man named Gardiner Wells, who was, according to local history, the one person who didn't show up for the meeting when the residents were naming the town. Wells was the major landowner of the real estate pieces, now the downtown Main Street section of Wellsville. The first oil boom came later in Wellsville's history, several decades after the founding of the town and village. A second boom occurred with the discovery of "Secondary Recovery", led by Bradley Producing, based in Wellsville. The method uses water, so abundant in Wellsville, to force the oil from the "oil sands".

Wellsville is known for being the junction of many foothill streams including Dyke's Creek feeding the Genesee River from the east. The water from Hurricane Agnes in 1972 exceeded the capacity and banks of Dyke's Creek, producing a rapid and huge pool of water at the center of the village. The extent of the damaged area continued downstream through Scio and Amity until the valley widened to accept the large flow of water in the lesser populated area. Erosion of topsoil during this flood eliminated many small farms.

In 1989, the US Post Office-Wellsville was listed on the National Register of Historic Places. The Wellsville Erie Depot was listed in 1987.

Lastly, in March 2006, a referendum to dissolve the village was defeated by the residents. At present, local officials are attempting to obtain a charter for the community to reorganize both municipalities into one entity, a city.

== Geography and climate ==
Land in Wellsville totals 2.4 square miles (6.2 km^{2}), according to the United States Census Bureau.

Relative to both New York and Pennsylvania, Wellsville is on the mainline of the Western New York and Pennsylvania Railroad. The Genesee River flows through the village. New York State Route 19, running north and south, intersects New York State Route 417 north and south of the center of town, with the two highways running together between the two intersections, parallel to Main Street. Route 417 from the east comes upstream having followed the tributaries of the Susquehanna River, the Chemung and the Canisteo. After passing through Wellsville, Route 417 quickly begins a downhill descent to the west on the Allegheny River, through its tributary in Bolivar, Dodge Creek.

Wellsville is located in the region of the Eastern Triple Divide, the cusp of the three major watersheds in the eastern United States. The Genesee River flows through the center of the village and the town of Wellsville, north to Rochester and Lake Ontario, then on to the St. Lawrence River and the Atlantic Ocean. In the Wellsville school district, in Alma, southwest of Wellsville, Honeoye Creek flows west to Oswayo Creek and then the Allegheny River, then to the Ohio and the Mississippi River, eventually to the Gulf of Mexico. And just over Jericho Hill to the northeast of Wellsville in the town of Alfred, the water flows to the east down the Canacadea Creek valley to the Canisteo River, eventually to the Susquehanna River and on to the Atlantic.

Rivetingly, the actual Triple Divide is a point 22 miles (35 km) south of Wellsville at 41°50′47″N 77°50′17″W, just south of the village of Gold, Pennsylvania. There, at the exact point, a bucket of water can be dumped and the water will flow three ways, theoretically unimpeded: north, southeast and southwest.

International and regional weather reports are often misleading when Wellsville's weather is reported. Meteorologists including the National Oceanic and Atmospheric Administration (NOAA) gather their weather data of the Wellsville area from meteorological devices located at the airport, at an elevation of 2,150 feet (660 m) above sea level. The village of Wellsville is at 1,500 feet (460 m), 650 feet (200 m) lower and protected from the winds in the Genesee River Valley. Wind speeds and temperature, as well as precipitation often differ greatly, especially in the spring and the fall, between the village and the top of the mountain where the airport is located (northeast leg of Niles Hill). Sometimes the temperature varies 10 °F (5 °C) between the village and the tops of the surrounding hills.

== Demographics ==
Historical population
Census	Pop.	Note	%±
1870	2,034		—
1880	2,049		0.7%
1890	3,435		67.6%
1900	3,556		3.5%
1910	4,382		23.2%
1920	4,996		14.0%
1930	5,674		13.6%
1940	5,942		4.7%
1950	6,402		7.7%
1960	5,967		−6.8%
1970	5,815		−2.5%
1980	5,769		−0.8%
1990	5,241		−9.2%
2000	5,171		−1.3%
2010	4,679		−9.5%
2020	4,587		−2.0%
U.S. Decennial Census

Given the census of 2000, there were 5,171 people, 2,162 households, and 1,206 families residing in the village. The population density was 2,168.7 inhabitants per square mile (837.3/km^{2}). There were 2,413 housing units at an average density of 1,012.0 per square mile (390.7/km^{2}). The racial makeup of the village was 95.92% White, 0.66% Black or African American, 0.19% Native American, 1.49% Asian, 0.29% from other races, and 1.45% from two or more races. Hispanic or Latino of any race were 0.91% of the population.

Households totaled 2,162, out of which 26.3% had children under the age of 18, 41.7% were married couples living together, 10.6% had a female householder with no husband present and 44.2% were non-families. 37.7% of all households were made up of individuals and 16.6% had someone living alone who was 65 years of age or older. The average household size was 2.22 and the average family size was 2.94.

The village's population includes 22.7% under the age of 18, 7.8% from 18 to 24, 25.6% from 25 to 44, 21.6% from 45 to 64, and 22.3% who were 65 years of age or older. The median age was 40 years. For every 100 females there were 88.1 males. For every 100 females age 18 and over there were 83.5 males.

The median income for a household in the village was $24,075, and the median income for a family was $36,345. Males had a median income of $32,950 versus $23,654 for females. The per capita income for the village was $16,950. About 12.5% of families and 18.9% of the population were below the poverty line, including 19.9% of those under age 18 and 10.8% of those age 65 or over.
