= Jesse Roberts =

American politician (1834–1915)

Member of the New York State Assembly
- In office January 1, 1892 – December 31, 1893
- Preceded by: Elias H. Davis
- Succeeded by: Otto Kelsey

Personal details
- Born: June 23, 1834 Sparta, New York, U.S.
- Died: February 28, 1915 (aged 80) Scottsburg, New York, U.S.
- Resting place: Scottsburg Union Cemetery, Scottsburg, New York, U.S.
- Party: Republican
- Spouse: Mary M. Wilbur (m. 1863)
- Children: 1
- Profession: Politician, farmer

Jesse Roberts (June 23, 1834 – February 28, 1915) was an American farmer and politician from New York.

== Life ==
Roberts was born on June 23, 1834, in Sparta, New York.

After growing up in the family farm and attending school, he moved to Scottsburg and became a farmer there. He was town supervisor from 1885 to 1887 and served as justice of the peace and postmaster at Scottsburg. He was also town assessor, and treasurer of the Livingston County Mutual Fire Insurance Company.

In 1891, Roberts was elected to the New York State Assembly as a Republican, representing Livingston County. He served in the Assembly in 1892 and 1893.

In 1863, Roberts married Mary M. Wilbur of Sparta. They had one son, W. W. Roberts.

Roberts died at home on February 28, 1915. He was buried in the family plot in Scottsburg Union Cemetery.

New York State Assembly
Preceded by Elias H. Davis	New York State Assembly; Livingston County; 1892-1893	Succeeded by Otto Kelsey
