= Groveland Correctional Facility =

Medium-security state prison for men located in New York, US

Coordinates: 42°40′56″N 77°50′10″W

- Interactive map of Groveland Correctional Facility
- Location: 7000 Sonyea Road Sonyea, New York
- Status: operational
- Security class: medium
- Capacity: 1106
- Opened: 1982
- Managed by: New York State Department of Corrections and Community Supervision

Groveland Correctional Facility is a medium security prison located in the Town of Groveland in Livingston County, New York, in the United States. The facility is located next to the community of Sonyea in Groveland on the site of a former Shaker community. The town is south of Rochester, Monroe County, New York, near Interstate 390.

The prison is divided into 2 parts, upper and lower, with a fence and sally port to restrict movement between the two. Dorms C-J, the prison hospital and food service are on the upper. Dorms K and L, as well as the commissary, school, church and recreation yards are on the lower. The recreation yards feature 3 softball diamonds, a weight yard and horseshoe pits.

In the past, female prisoners were held at Groveland, but it is currently a male facility. As of 2010 Groveland had a working capacity of 1106.

== History ==
The Shakers owned the Groveland Shaker Village after 1836, when they moved from Sodus in Wayne County, New York to escape worldly influences. When the membership of the sect declined, the Shakers sold the land to the state after they were assured it would be used for good purpose. Several of the Shaker buildings are still used today.

In 1896, the state opened a facility for epileptics on 1900 acres of land in Sonyea. The institution was known first as the Sonyea Colony, before being renamed as the Craig Colony for Epileptics after Oscar Craig, who at the time served as president of New York's State Board of Charities. The facility closed in 1968, and the land and buildings were later repurposed by the state prison system.
