= Groveland Station, New York =

Groveland Station, New York Groveland
- Census-designated place
- Location within New York Location within the United States
- Coordinates: 42°39′48″N 77°46′00″W
- Country: United States
- State: New York
- County: Livingston
- Towns: Groveland, Sparta

Area
  - Total: 0.59 sq mi (1.52 km^{2})
  - Land: 0.59 sq mi (1.52 km^{2})
  - Water: 0 sq mi (0.00 km^{2})
- Elevation: 633 ft (193 m)

Population (2020)
  - Total: 246
  - Density: 419.5/sq mi (161.98/km^{2})
- Time zone: UTC-5 (Eastern (EST))
  - Summer (DST): UTC-4 (EDT)
- ZIP Codes: 14462 (Groveland); 14437 (Dansville)
- Area code: 585
- GNIS feature ID: 2584263
- FIPS code: 36-31022

Groveland Station is a census-designated place (CDP) in Livingston County, New York, United States. The CDP consists of the hamlet of Groveland and nearby residential areas. As of the 2020 census, Groveland Station had a population of 246. New York State Route 63 passes through the community.

== History ==
The Sparta First Presbyterian Church at the junction of Groveland Scottsburg Road and Groveland Hill Road was added to the National Register of Historic Places in 2007.

== Geography ==
The Groveland Station CDP is in south-central Livingston County, primarily in the town of Groveland but extending south into the town of Sparta. State Route 63 leads north 10 miles (16 km) to Geneseo, the Livingston county seat, and south 8 miles (13 km) to Dansville. State Route 258 leads west from Groveland Station 2 miles (3 km) to State Route 36, less than a mile from Exit 6 on Interstate 390.

According to the U.S. Census Bureau, the CDP has an area of 0.59 square miles (1.5 km^{2}), all land. The western border of the CDP follows Canaseraga Creek, which flows northwest to the Genesee River.

== Demographics ==
Historical population
Census	Pop.	Note	%±
2020	246		—
U.S. Decennial Census
