= New York State Route 258 =

State highway in Livingston County, New York, US

New York State Route 258
- Flats Road
- Map of Livingston and Wyoming counties with NY 258 highlighted in red

Route information
- Maintained by NYSDOT
- Length: 1.85 mi (2.98 km)
- Existed: c. 1931–present

Major junctions
- West end: NY 36 on Groveland–West Sparta town line
- East end: NY 63 in Groveland

Location
- Country: United States
- State: New York
- Counties: Livingston

Highway system
- New York Highways; Interstate; US; State; Reference; Parkways
← NY 257	→ NY 259

New York State Route 258 (NY 258) is a state highway located entirely within the town of Groveland in Livingston County, New York, in the United States. It connects NY 36 in the hamlet of Ross Corners to NY 63 in the hamlet of Groveland Station. NY 258 is named Flats Road and passes through the flat terrain of the valley surrounding Canaseraga Creek. Most of NY 258 is routed along the Groveland–West Sparta town line.

Although modern NY 258 is nothing more than a simple east–west connector between NY 36 and NY 63, it originally extended westward past NY 36 to NY 408 in the town of Mount Morris when it was first assigned in the early 1930s. By 1983, maintenance of all of NY 258 west of NY 36 had been transferred to Livingston County, leading to the truncation of the route to NY 36 in the mid-1990s.

== Route description ==
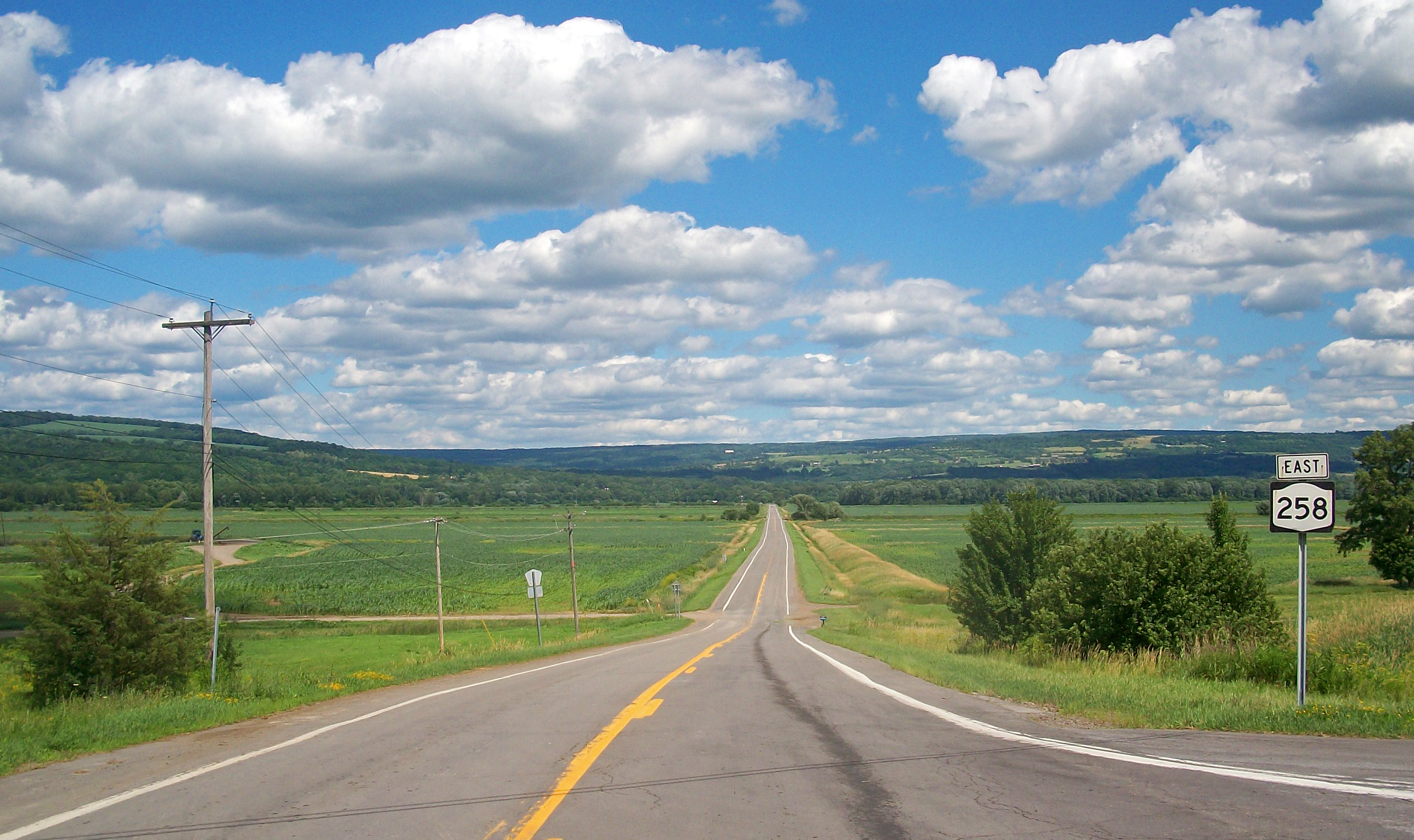
View from western terminus through the Groveland Flats

NY 258 begins at an intersection with NY 36 on the Groveland–West Sparta town line. The route heads eastward down a small hill, which leads to the flat terrain and open fields of the Canaseraga Creek valley that gives NY 258 the name of Flats Road. About 1.5 miles (2.4 km) east of NY 36, NY 258 crosses the Dansville and Mount Morris Railroad. East of the railroad crossing, NY 258 veers northeastward off the town line as it approaches the hamlet of Groveland Station. In its final 0.25 miles (0.40 km), the route passes over Canaseraga Creek and climbs slightly in elevation upon entering Groveland Station. NY 258 terminates in the center of the hamlet at a junction with NY 63.

== History ==
When NY 258 was assigned c. 1931, it extended from NY 63 (now NY 408) in the town of Mount Morris to NY 36A (modern NY 63) in Groveland. In between, NY 258 served the hamlet of Tuscarora and intersected NY 36. NY 245, a parallel route to the south that extended from Pike to the city of Geneva via Dansville, was realigned between the villages of Nunda and Dansville in the late 1940s to overlap NY 408, NY 258, and NY 36 between the two locations. The overlap between NY 245 and NY 258 was eliminated in the late 1950s when NY 245 was restored to its previous, direct alignment between Nunda and Dansville.

NY 258 through the Groveland Flats of Canaseraga Creek were a constant flooding location during the spring and autumn. Fishermen would use Groveland Flats certain times for fishing for carp that would flood through the flats. After flooding in September 1967, a new study came out about how to deal with the flooding. This would have involved inundating NY 258 through the Groveland Flats with water. Thomas F. McGowan, a New York State Assemblyman, opposed the project because losing the stretch of NY 258 would cut a vital connection between NY 36 and NY 63. It also would force a detour of 15–20 miles (24–32 km) for commuters and isolate members of the Groveland Fire District. The new project proposed to cost $7.4 million (1968 USD), despite opposition of Assemblyman James Emery of Geneseo, who preferred working with the state on improving NY 258. In March 1968, Emery announced that the New York State Department of Transportation had a project ready to be started for raising NY 258 through the Groveland Flats.

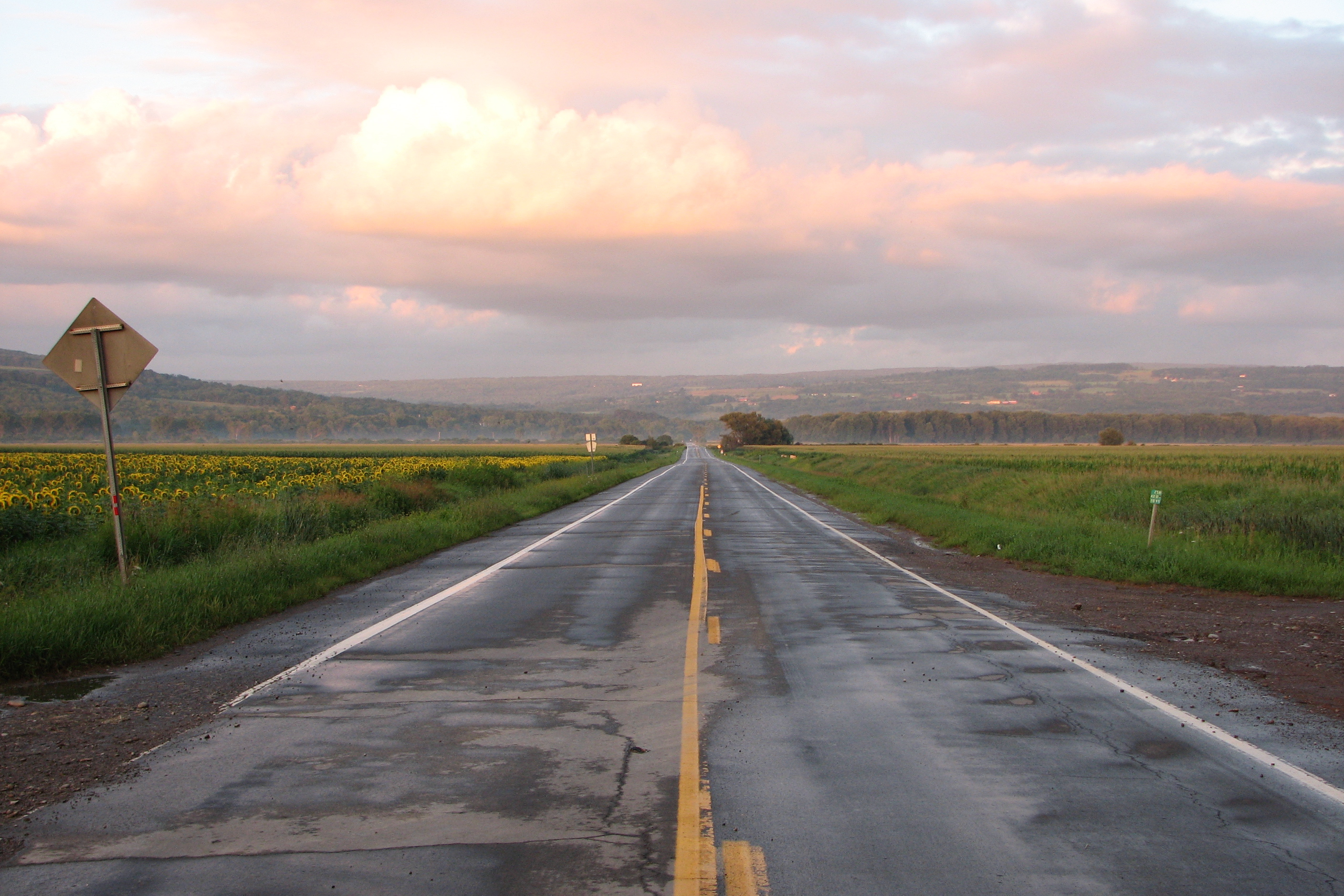
Alternate view from western terminus through the Groveland Flats

The project to raise NY 258 through the Groveland Flats hit a snag in 1969 due to delays related to the construction of the Genesee Expressway. The work involved the possibility of NY 258 and the expressway overlapping, so they chose to work on the projects concurrently, which involved deferring NY 258. Assemblyman Emery was notified that the expressway would be on the section of NY 258 west of the Groveland Flats and there was no reason to continue deferral. On February 14, 1970, Emery announced that NYSDOT would start construction on the project in 1972, with a slated completion in 1973. The new project would raise NY 258 above the flood line.

On April 1, 1983, ownership and maintenance of NY 258 between Main Street in Tuscarora and NY 36 at Ross Corners was transferred from the state of New York to Livingston County as part of a highway maintenance swap between the two levels of government. NY 258's routing was unchanged; instead, it became concurrent with County Route 72 (CR 72) as a result of the shift in maintenance. It became the second section of NY 258 to be transferred to Livingston County, as the portion from NY 408 near Brooks Grove to Presbyterian Road in Tuscarora had been co-designated as part of CR 3 sometime prior to the swap. The county-maintained western extension of NY 258 remained intact until the mid-1990s when NY 258 was truncated to its junction with NY 36 at Ross Corners.

== Major intersections ==
The entire route is in Livingston County.

Location	mi	km	Destinations	Notes
Groveland–West Sparta town line	0.00	0.00	NY 36	Western terminus; hamlet of Ross Corners
Groveland	1.85	2.98	NY 63 – Geneseo, Dansville	Eastern terminus; hamlet of Groveland Station
1.000 mi = 1.609 km; 1.000 km = 0.621 mi

== See also ==
- List of county routes in Livingston County, New York
