= Groveland Shaker Village =

Coordinates: 42°40′56″N 77°50′10″W

Groveland Shaker Village was a settlement of Shakers in Groveland, New York under the bishopric of Groveland.

In 1826, a Shaker group was organized that would become the Groveland Shaker Village, Groveland. They moved from Sodus in Wayne County, New York to escape worldly influences. When the membership of the sect declined, the Shakers sold the land to New York State after they were assured it would be used for good purpose. Several of the Shaker buildings are still used today, including the large brick Letchworth building.

In the 1890s, New York State opened a facility for people with epilepsy here, called Craig Colony for Epileptics. While a popular myth circulates that the name Sonyea is an acronym for "State of New York Epileptic Asylum," the place name was used long before the state institution was established. The word comes from the Seneca language and has several translations, including "a warm and sunny place."

In the 1980s, the land and buildings were taken over by the state prison system. It is now the Groveland Correctional Facility.

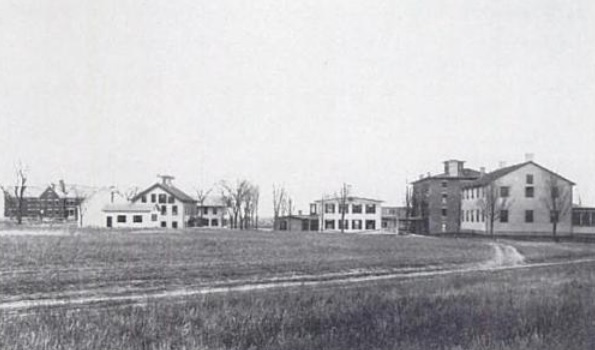
Groveland Shaker Village, New York., 1890s. The photograph includes an 1842 meetinghouse (right), shops, and a four-story, late 1850s brick East Family building. New York State Museum, Albany.
