= Abbey Perkins Cheney =

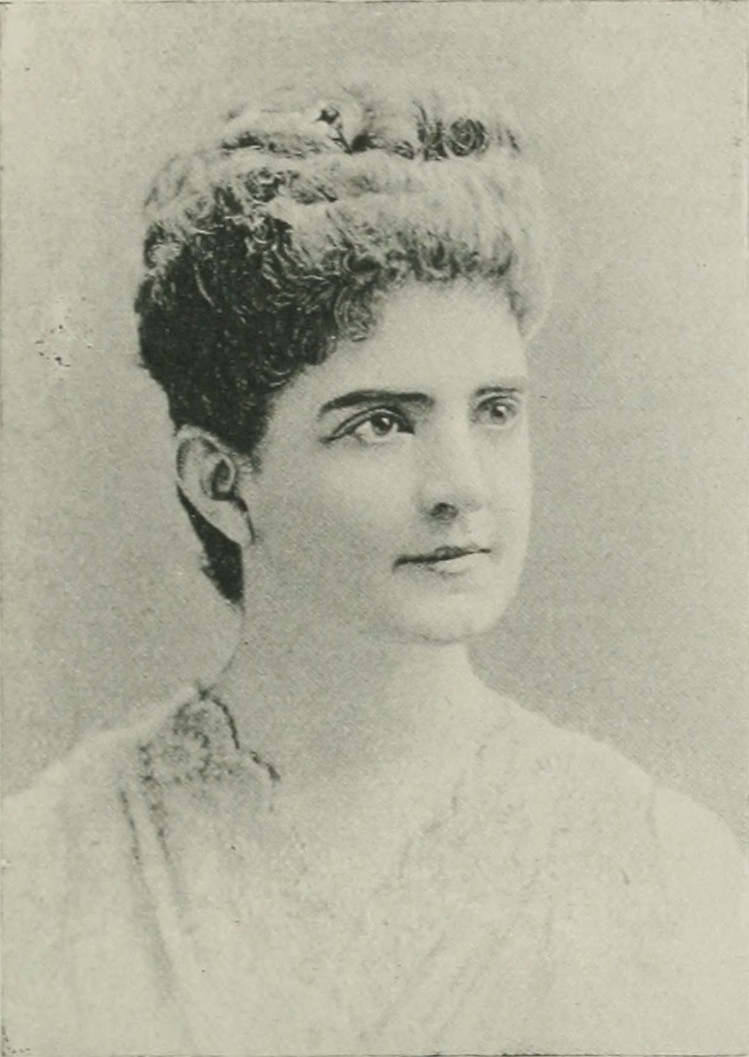
- Abbey Perkins Cheney, "A Woman of the Century"

Background information
- Born: November 18, 1851; Milwaukee, Wisconsin, US
- Died: April 3, 1970 (aged 85)
- Occupation: Educator

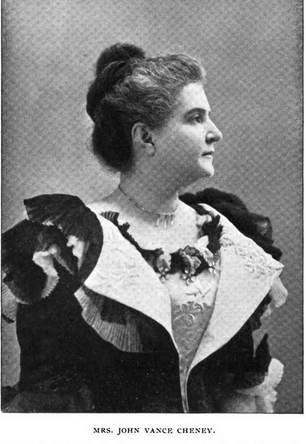
Abbey Perkins Cheney, from an 1897 publication.

Abigail Perkins Cheney (November 18, 1851 – April 3, 1970) was an American musical educator.

== Early life ==
Abbey (also Abigail or Abbie) Perkins was born on November 18, 1851, in Milwaukee, Wisconsin.

Perkins inherited her rare gifts through her mother, from a long line of singing ancestors, the Cheneys of Vermont, who for a hundred years had been famous for their fine and powerful voices and exceptional musical culture. Her mother, Elizabeth Ela Cheney (born February 23, 1823, in Brentwood, New York), had a remarkably pure and strong mezzo-soprano voice, and was very successful before her marriage touring with her brothers, as a church and concert singer in Buffalo, New York, and subsequently in Milwaukee, Wisconsin, and in Leavenworth, Kansas. In her old age, she still enjoyed the musical and literary pleasures of her daughter's San Francisco home.

Perkins's father, Charles Wesley Perkins, one of the enterprising young business men of Milwaukee in the 1850s, was also a music lover. He died in 1861, and his last words to his little daughter were: "Lose no opportunity to cultivate your musical talent." The father's wish decided the child's future: her mother encouraged and aided her daughter in every way.

== Career ==
Abbey Perkins, as a little girl, achieved such successes that, when only fourteen years old, she was called with her mother to take charge of the music in Ingham University, LeRoy, New York. Two years later they resigned that position in order to go abroad for the prosecution of the daughter's musical studies. They went to Germany, where Perkins entered the Conservatory of Leipsic, and also received private tuition from Louis Plaidy. During that year in Leipsic she was a pupil of Oscar Paul, of Theodor Coccius, of Carl Reinecke and others on the piano, and of Ernst Richter in harmony. But the best teachers in Leipsic were unsatisfactory in point of technique, and through the counsel of honest Coccius, as well as by advice of the master, Franz Liszt, she went to Stuttgart to study with Sigismund Lebert, whom Liszt pronounced the greatest living teacher of technique. The school year at Stuttgart had just closed, and Perkins presented herself tremblingly to the master for examination, winning such favor that he offered to teach her, contrary to his custom, through vacation, going three times a week to his pupil's bouse and to the last refusing all compensation. When the school reopened, the young musician was admitted to the artists' class, and there for four years she studied with Lebert and with Priickner, the friend of Von Billow. Then, having received her diploma, she began in Germany her successful career as a musical educator. A term of study with Edward Neupert, the pupil of Theodor Kullak, closed her pupil life, but by no means ended her musical studies.

First in Sacramento, California, and later in San Francisco, Cheney was the pioneer of a new school of musical technique, and the signal success achieved by her pupils was proof conclusive that in her treatment of piano-playing, primarily from the physiological standpoint, she enlarged and improved the methods of her masters, Reinecke, Lebert and others. The physiological investigations, which made Cheney an originator in her field of work, were instigated by her partial paralysis of the right hand and arm, brought on by overtaxation when completing her studies abroad. Due to this fact she was a sympathetic broad-minded, self-sacrificing educator instead of a concert pianist. Ellen Browning Scripps was one of her students.

Cheney is the author of What It Is That Heals.

== Personal life ==
In 1876, when Abbey Perkins returned to America from Germany, she was courted by a young musician, poet and litterateur, John Vance Cheney (born December 29, 1848, in Groveland, New York), whom she married and went to live together in California in 1876. They had two daughters, Janet Vance Cheney (born December 30, 1876) and Evelyn Hope Cheney (born September 19, 1881) and divorced in 1894.
