= New York State Route 255 =

Former state highway in New York State

New York State Route 255
- Stagecoach Road
- NY 255 highlighted in red

Route information
- Maintained by Livingston County
- Length: 5.8 mi (9.3 km)
- Existed: 1930–October 25, 1995

Major junctions
- South end: NY 256 in Sparta
- North end: NY 15 in Conesus

Location
- Country: United States
- State: New York
- Counties: Livingston

Highway system
- New York Highways; Interstate; US; State; Reference; Parkways
← NY 254	→ NY 256

New York State Route 255 (NY 255) was a 5.8-mile-long (9.3 km) state highway located in Livingston County, New York, in the United States. The southern terminus of the route was at an intersection with NY 256 south of the community of Scottsburg in Sparta. Its northern terminus was at a junction with NY 15 in Conesus. NY 255, known locally as Stagecoach Road, was assigned in 1930 and maintained by Livingston County from 1983 onward as County Route 71 (CR 71). The concurrent state highway designation was removed in 1995.

== Route description ==
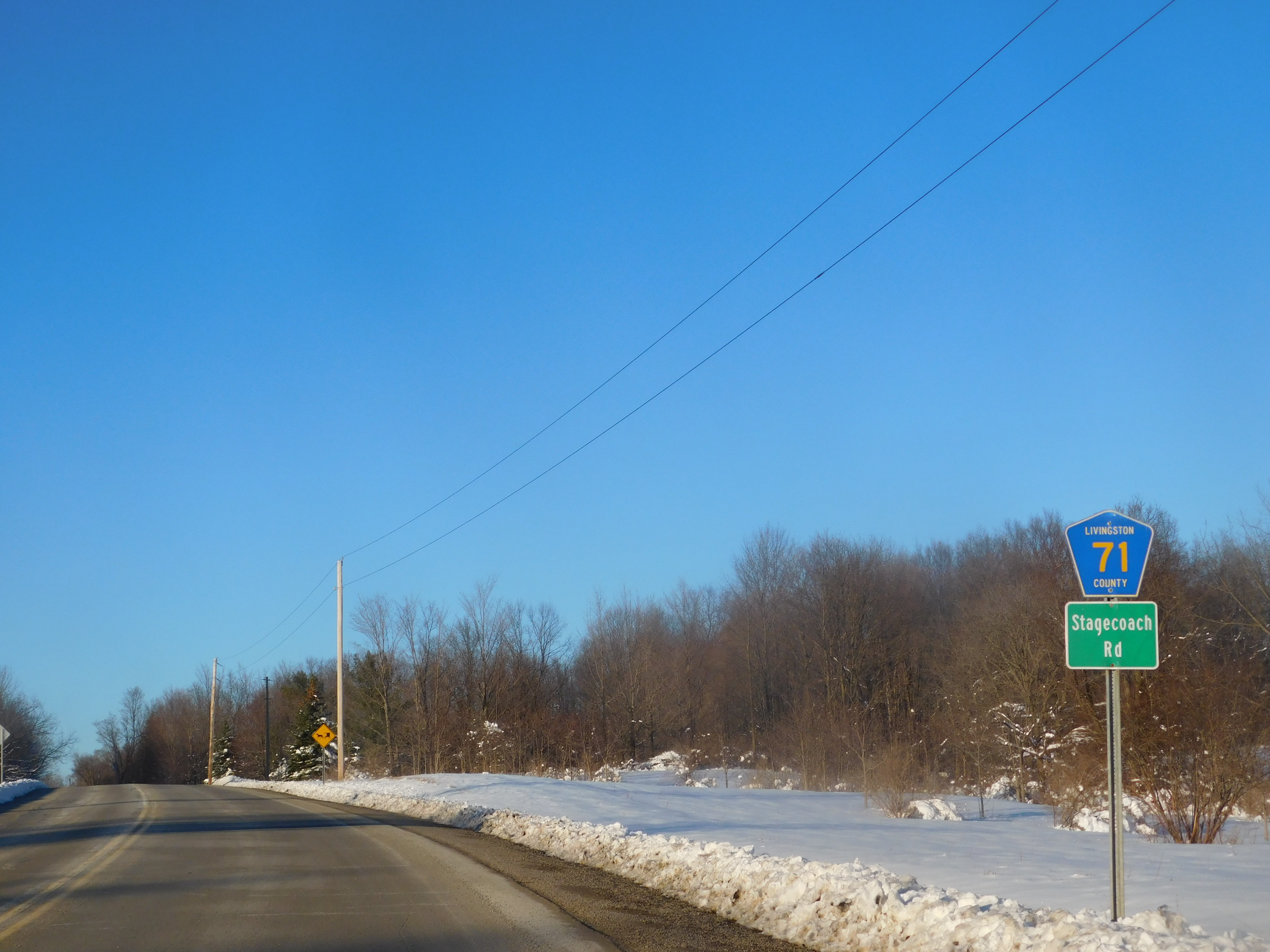
Livingston CR 71 from NY 256 in Sparta, the former southern terminus of NY 255

NY 255 began at an intersection with NY 256 southeast of the hamlet of Scottsburg and north of the village of Dansville in the town of Sparta. While NY 256 headed northwest into a valley surrounding the Conesus Inlet, NY 255 headed northward as Stagecoach Road, running across mostly undeveloped areas along the top of the valley. East of Scottsburg, NY 255 intersected CR 1A (Springwater Road) and CR 38 (Liberty Pole Road), the former connecting to Scottsburg, before crossing into Conesus. Within Conesus, NY 255 continued along the upper edge of the valley to the hamlet of Conesus, located near the southeastern tip of Conesus Lake, where it terminated at a junction with NY 15.

== History ==
The north–south highway connecting Dansville to Conesus was taken over by the state of New York by 1926. In the 1930 renumbering of state highways in New York, NY 255 was assigned to the entirety of the highway, extending from NY 36 and NY 39 (now NY 63) in Dansville and NY 2 (now NY 15) in Conesus. NY 255 was truncated to Sparta in December 1940 and replaced with an extended NY 256 between Dansville and Scottsburg. On April 1, 1983, ownership and maintenance of NY 255 was transferred from the state of New York to Livingston County as part of a highway maintenance swap between the two levels of government. Although the road was now maintained by Livingston County as CR 71, the road initially remained signed as NY 255 as well. The NY 255 designation was finally removed from the road on October 25, 1995.

== Major intersections ==
The entire route was in Livingston County.

Location	mi	km	Destinations	Notes
Sparta	0.0	0.0	NY 256 (West Swamp Road)	
Conesus	5.8	9.3	NY 15 (Conesus–Springwater Road)	
1.000 mi = 1.609 km; 1.000 km = 0.621 mi

== See also ==
- List of county routes in Livingston County, New York
