= Black and White Farm Barn =

- U.S. National Register of Historic Places
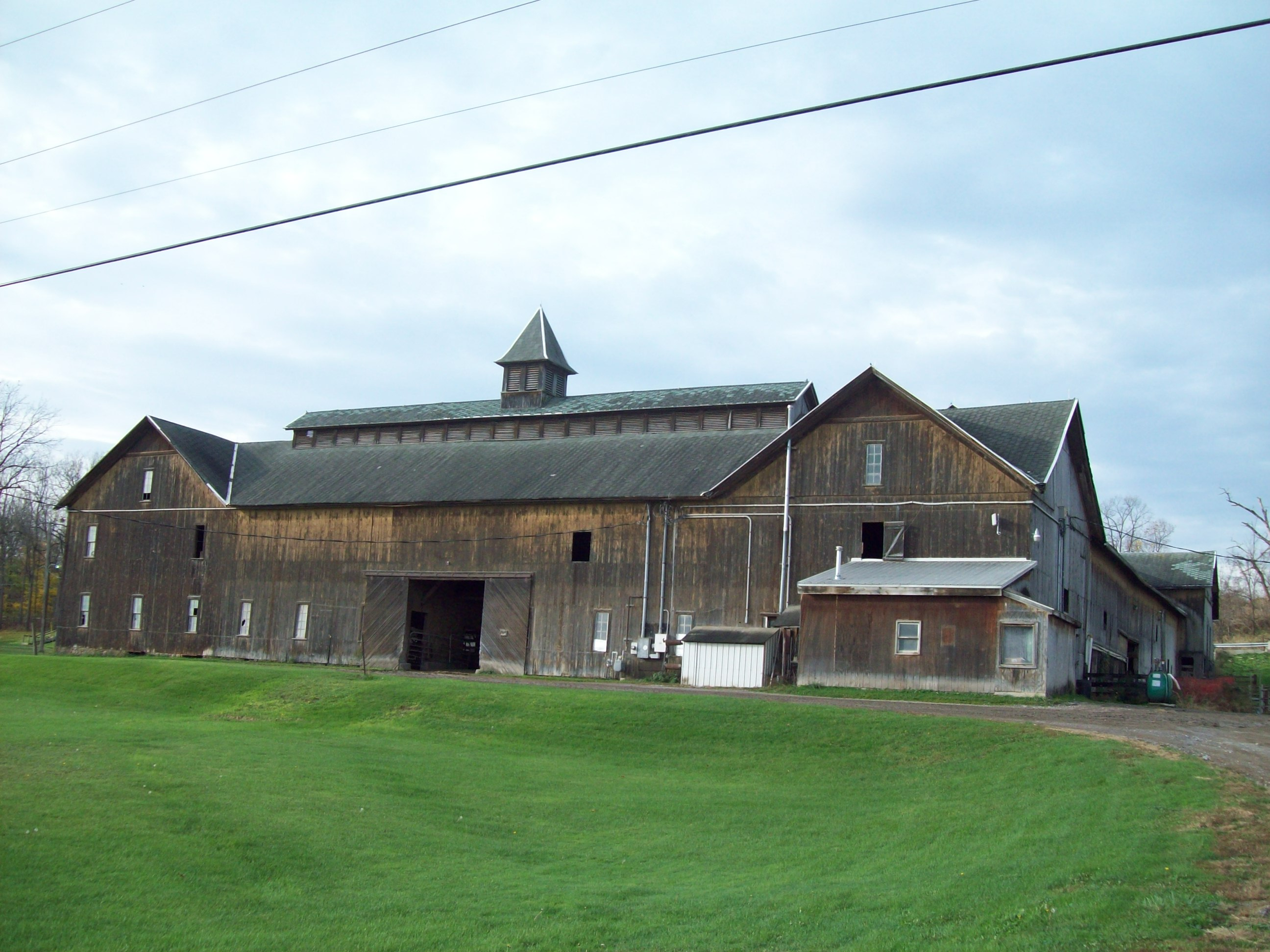
- Black and White Farm Barn, October 2009

- Location within New York Location within the United States
- Nearest city: Sonyea, New York
- Coordinates: 42°39′58″N 77°48′30″W
- Area: 8 acres (3.2 ha)
- Built: 1884
- Architect: Joseph Cone
- NRHP reference No.: 88000031
- Added to NRHP: February 8, 1988

Black and White Farm Barn is a historic barn located near Sonyea in Livingston County, New York. It is a large two story wood-frame building built in 1884 on a 600-acre (2.4 km^{2}) farm. The barn is rectangular in plan and measures 160 feet (49 m) in length and 200 feet (61 m) in depth. It features a central courtyard which measures approximately 80 feet (24 m) in length and 120 feet (37 m) in depth.

It was listed on the National Register of Historic Places in 1988.
