= Tuscarora (CDP), New York =

Tuscarora, New York
- Census-designated place
- Location within New York Location within the United States
- Coordinates: 42°38′3″N 77°52′9″W
- Country: United States
- State: New York
- County: Livingston
- Town: Mount Morris

Area
  - Total: 0.093 sq mi (0.24 km^{2})
  - Land: 0.093 sq mi (0.24 km^{2})
  - Water: 0 sq mi (0.00 km^{2})
- Elevation: 750 ft (230 m)

Population (2020)
  - Total: 71
  - Density: 763.0/sq mi (294.58/km^{2})
- Time zone: UTC-5 (Eastern (EST))
  - Summer (DST): UTC-4 (EDT)
- ZIP Code: 14510 (Mount Morris)
- Area code: 585
- GNIS feature ID: 967991
- FIPS code: 36-75726

Tuscarora is a hamlet and census-designated place in the town of Mount Morris in Livingston County, New York, United States. It had a population of 71 in the 2020 census.

== Geography ==
Tuscarora is in southwestern Livingston County, in the southeast part of the town of Mount Morris. It is in the valley of Keshequa Creek, a northeast-flowing tributary of Canaseraga Creek and part of the Genesee River watershed. It is 7 miles (11 km) south of the village of Mount Morris, 13 miles (21 km) south-southwest of Geneseo, the Livingston county seat, and 12 miles (19 km) northwest of Dansville.

According to the U.S. Census Bureau, the Tuscarora CDP has an area of 0.09 square miles (0.24 km^{2}), of all land.

The First Presbyterian Church of Tuscarora, built circa 1844, is a historic church in the center of the hamlet. It is the last surviving public building from Tuscarora's brief early to mid-19th century commercial prosperity related to its location on the Genesee Valley Canal.

== Demographics ==
Historical population
Census	Pop.	Note	%±
2020	71		—
U.S. Decennial Census
