= Daniel Kelly (Medal of Honor) =

Daniel Armer Kelly
- Born: March 19, 1841; Groveland, New York, US
- Died: January 18, 1912 (aged 70)
- Burial place: Reading, Michigan, US
- Military career
- Allegiance: United States of America
- Branch: United States Army
- Service years: 1862 - 1865
- Rank: Quartermaster Sergeant
- Units: (New York (state)) Company G, 8th New York Cavalry
- Conflicts: Battle of Waynesboro; American Civil War
- Awards: Medal of Honor

Daniel Armer Kelly (March 19, 1841 - January 18, 1912) was an American soldier who fought in the American Civil War. Kelly received the United States' highest award for bravery during combat, the Medal of Honor. Kelly's medal was won for his extraordinary heroism during the Battle of Waynesboro, in Virginia on March 2, 1865. He was honored with the award on March 26, 1865.

Kelly was born in Groveland, New York. He joined the Army in August 1862, and mustered out with his regiment in June 1865. Kelly was buried in Reading, Michigan.

== Medal of Honor citation ==
The President of the United States of America, in the name of Congress, takes pleasure in presenting the Medal of Honor to Sergeant Daniel Armer Kelly, United States Army, for extraordinary heroism on 2 March 1865, while serving with Company G, 8th New York Cavalry, in action at Waynesboro, Virginia, for capture of flag.

== See also ==
- List of American Civil War Medal of Honor recipients: G–L
