= Scottsburg, New York =

- Census-designated place
- Location within New York Location within the United States
- Coordinates: 42°39′51″N 77°42′51″W
- Country: United States
- State: New York
- County: Livingston
- Towns: Sparta, Groveland

Area
  - Total: 0.17 sq mi (0.43 km^{2})
  - Land: 0.17 sq mi (0.43 km^{2})
  - Water: 0 sq mi (0.00 km^{2})
- Elevation: 925 ft (282 m)

Population (2020)
  - Total: 137
  - Density: 832.9/sq mi (321.58/km^{2})
- Time zone: UTC-5 (Eastern (EST))
  - Summer (DST): UTC-4 (EDT)
- ZIP code: 14545
- Area code: 585
- GNIS feature ID: 964694
- FIPS code: 36-65926

Scottsburg is a hamlet and census-designated place (CDP) in Livingston County, New York, United States. As of the 2020 census, Scottsburg had a population of 137. New York State Route 256 passes through the community.

== Geography ==
Scottsburg is in southern Livingston County, mainly in the northern part of the town of Sparta. A small portion of the CDP extends west into the town of Groveland. State Route 256 leads south 8 miles (13 km) to Dansville and north 12 miles (19 km) to Lakeville. Geneseo, the Livingston county seat, is 12 miles northwest of Scottsburg.

According to the U.S. Census Bureau, the Scottsburg CDP has an area of 0.16 square miles (0.41 km^{2}), all land. It sits in the valley of Conesus Inlet, which flows north 4 miles (6 km) to Conesus Lake, the westernmost of the Finger Lakes.

== Demographics ==
Historical population
Census	Pop.	Note	%±
2020	137		—
U.S. Decennial Census

== Points of interest ==
- The gravesite of Daniel Shays is in Union Cemetery.
