= Claud No. 1 Archeological Site =

Archaeological site in New York, U.S.

- U.S. National Register of Historic Places
- Nearest city: Groveland, New York
- Area: 30 acres (12 ha)
- NRHP reference No.: 75001195
- Added to NRHP: August 19, 1975

Claud No. 1 Archeological Site is an archaeological site located at Groveland in Livingston County, New York.

It was listed on the National Register of Historic Places in 1975.
