= Pavilion, New York =

- Town
- Location in Genesee County and the state of New York
- Coordinates: 42°54′10″N 78°0′28″W
- Country: United States
- State: New York
- County: Genesee

Government
  - Type: Town council
  - Town supervisor: Robert LaPoint
  - Town council: Members' list: • Donald Oberlin; • James Thater; • Mark Heineman; • John Rudgers

Area
  - Total: 35.72 sq mi (92.51 km^{2})
  - Land: 35.61 sq mi (92.23 km^{2})
  - Water: 0.11 sq mi (0.28 km^{2})
- Elevation: 994 ft (303 m)

Population (2010)
  - Total: 2,495
  - Estimate (2016): 2,409
  - Density: 67.7/sq mi (26.12/km^{2})
- Time zone: UTC-5 (Eastern (EST))
  - Summer (DST): UTC-4 (EDT)
- ZIP Codes: 14525 (Pavilion); 14482 (Le Roy); 14054 (East Bethany); 14591 (Wyoming)
- Area code: 585
- FIPS code: 36-037-56792
- GNIS feature ID: 0979346
- Website: Town of Pavilion

Pavilion is a town in Genesee County, New York, United States. The population was 2,495 at the 2010 census. The town was named after a hotel in Saratoga Springs, New York, by an early resident. The town of Pavilion is in the southeastern corner of Genesee County and is southeast of the city of Batavia.

== History ==
The area was first settled circa 1805. The town of Pavilion was founded in 1841 from the town of Covington (in Wyoming County). More territory was gained in 1842 from the towns of Le Roy and Stafford.

== Geography ==
According to the United States Census Bureau, the town has a total area of 35.7 square miles (92 km^{2}), of which 35.6 square miles (92 km^{2}) is land and 0.1 square miles (0.26 km^{2}), or 0.28%, is water.

The east town line is the border of Livingston County, and the south and part of the west town line is the border of Wyoming County.

Oatka Creek, a tributary of the Genesee River, flows northward through the town into the town of Stafford.

US Route 20, and east-west highway, crosses the center of the town and intersects north-south highway, NY-19 at Pavilion Center. US-20 crosses NY-63 (historic Big Tree Road) at Pavilion village.

== Demographics ==
Historical population
Census	Pop.	Note	%±
1850	1,640		—
1860	1,723		5.1%
1870	1,614		−6.3%
1880	1,649		2.2%
1890	1,581		−4.1%
1900	1,542		−2.5%
1910	1,462		−5.2%
1920	1,337		−8.5%
1930	1,236		−7.6%
1940	1,361		10.1%
1950	1,459		7.2%
1960	1,721		18.0%
1970	2,122		23.3%
1980	2,375		11.9%
1990	2,327		−2.0%
2000	2,467		6.0%
2010	2,495		1.1%
2016 (est.)	2,409	▼	−3.4%
U.S. decennial census

As of the census of 2000, there were 2,467 people, 886 households, and 691 families residing in the town. The population density was 69.2 inhabitants per square mile (26.7/km^{2}). There were 930 housing units at an average density of 26.1 per square mile (10.1/km^{2}). The racial makeup of the town was 97.45% white, .65% African American, .49% Native American, .2% Asian, .04% Pacific Islander, .32% from other races, and .85% from two or more races. Hispanic or Latino of any race were .53% of the population.

There were 886 households, out of which 37.8% had children under the age of 18 living with them, 63.5% were married couples living together, 9.1% had a female householder with no husband present, and 21.9% were non-families. 17.2% of all households were made up of individuals, and 6.8% had someone living alone who was 65 years of age or older. The average household size was 2.78 and the average family size was 3.1.

In the town, the population was spread out, with 28.5% under the age of 18, 6% from 18 to 24, 30.4% from 25 to 44, 24.5% from 45 to 64, and 10.6% who were 65 years of age or older. The median age was 37 years. For every 100 females, there were 102.7 males. For every 100 females age 18 and over, there were 100.1 males.

The median income for a household in the town was $48,837, and the median income for a family was $51,750. Males had a median income of $31,074 versus $25,125 for females. The per capita income for the town was $20,254. About 3.9% of families and 5.4% of the population were below the poverty line, including 8.6% of those under age 18 and 3.4% of those age 65 or over.

== Notable residents ==
- Gregory Reinhart, opera singer
- Frances Metcalfe Wolcott, socialite and author who owned Hillcrest, a country estate in Pavilion.

== Communities and locations in Pavilion ==
- Bailey's Mills – A former location in the town, located in the northwest part of Pavilion.
- Bennetts Corners – A location in the southeastern part of the town, southeast of Phelps Corners.
- Junction – A hamlet north of Pavilion Center on NY-19.
- Le Roy Reservoir – A lake east of Union Corners.
- Pavilion – The principal hamlet (and census-designated place), located at the junction of Routes NY-19 and NY-63 in the south part of the town.
- Pavilion Center – A small hamlet at the junction of Routes 19 and 20, north of Pavilion village.
- Phelps Corners – A location in the southeastern part of the town at the intersection of South Street and York Road.
- Union Corners – A hamlet near the eastern border of the town at the intersection of South Street and Walker Road.
