= John Vance Cheney =

American poet, essayist and librarian

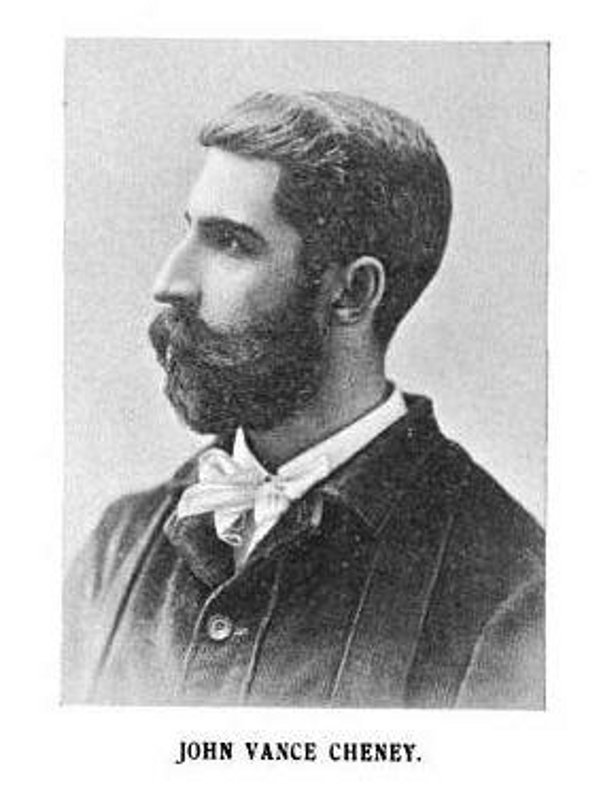

John Vance Cheney (December 29, 1848 in Groveland, New York – May 1, 1922) was an American poet, essayist and librarian. Educated in Geneseo, New York, Cheney practiced law briefly in Woodstock, Vermont and New York City before moving to California with his first wife Abigail Perkins Vance Cheney, teaching music, lecturing, and working as a postal clerk. In 1887 he assumed the position of librarian of the Free Public Library of San Francisco, where he oversaw the openings of the system's first branch libraries and hosted the first west coast conference of the American Library Association in 1891. In 1894 he moved to Chicago, where he served as librarian of the Newberry Library. In 1909 he retired and moved to San Diego with his second wife, Sara Barker Chamberlain.

Cheney was a regular contributor to major literary magazines, including The Century, Atlantic Monthly, New England Magazine, and Harper's Monthly. His collected works, written between 1887 and his death in 1922, fill eight volumes.

He married Abbey Perkins Cheney (b. November 18, 1851) in 1876 and had two daughters, Janet Vance Cheney (b. Dec. 30, 1876) and Evelyn Hope Cheney (b. Sept. 19, 1881).

== Reviews ==
The following review appeared in Sunset, Vol. 16 (1906)

- Complete Poems of John Vance Cheney (1906) Riverside Press, Cambridge, and Massachusetts.
  "Though the author of this attractive book of verse, John Vance Cheney, has been a stranger to California for many years, he has not forgotten the charm of out-of-door life and the love of Nature which held him while a resident of San Francisco. In his later poems, included in the present volume, recently issued by the Riverside Press, he touches with delicate phrase and musical song many bits of sentiment suggested by the trees, the flowers, the birds, the clouds of the land of out-of-doors—the same spirit that pervaded the poems of his earlier books. All these are here reprinted, also the fugitive verses which have appeared in the principal magazines, and the harvest here shown is one well worth a poet's pardonable pride. Mr. Cheney was for many years librarian of the San Francisco Free Public Library, leaving that post several years ago to take charge of the Newberry Library of Chicago; but a poet's friends are limited to no place, and the readers of this cheerful singer everywhere will welcome this opportunity of holding in one volume all the good and gracious verses written by their favorite up to the present time. His is a happy faculty of touching the little things of life with a glamour that comforts and brightens. For instance, this, which suggests the "book of verses" quatrain of old Omar:"

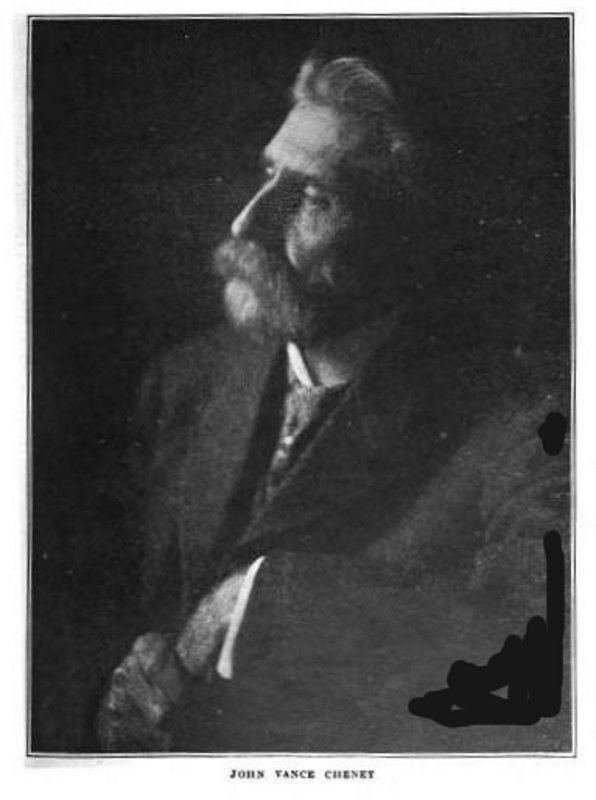
In 1906

I WOULDN'T

A sprig or mint by the wayward brook;
A nibble of birch in the wood;
A summer day and love and a book,
And I wouldn't be king if I could.

And again:

THE TREES

Men hope and labor and despair
Laughter they have and sorrow;
The trees their God's composure wear
Tomorrow and tomorrow.

"The volume contains a valuable index to the first lines, in addition to the usual contents by title. Mr. Cheney is a frequent contributor to Sunset. The portrait frontispiece of this present March number shows Mr. Cheney as the camera shows him in his latest photograph."
