= Pavilion (CDP), New York =

Pavilion, New York
- Census-designated place
- Location within New York Location within the United States
- Coordinates: 42°52′33″N 78°1′21″W
- Country: United States
- State: New York
- County: Genesee

Area
  - Total: 3.76 sq mi (9.75 km^{2})
  - Land: 3.76 sq mi (9.75 km^{2})
  - Water: 0 sq mi (0.00 km^{2})
- Elevation: 955 ft (291 m)

Population (2020)
  - Total: 664
  - Density: 176.3/sq mi (68.08/km^{2})
- Time zone: UTC-5 (Eastern (EST))
  - Summer (DST): UTC-4 (EDT)
- ZIP code: 14525
- Area code: 585
- FIPS code: 36-56781
- GNIS feature ID: 2628177

Pavilion is a hamlet and census-designated place within the town of Pavilion in Genesee County, New York, United States. As of the 2010 census, the population of the CDP was 646, out of a total of 2,495 people in the town as a whole.

== Geography ==
The hamlet is in southeastern Genesee County in the southern part of the town of Pavilion, at the intersection of New York State Routes 19 and 63. NY 19 (Lake Street) leads north 7 miles (11 km) to Le Roy and southwest 12 miles (19 km) to Warsaw, while NY 63 leads northwest 12 miles (19 km) to Batavia, the county seat, and southeast 13 miles (21 km) to Geneseo. The southern edge of the CDP follows the Genesee County/Wyoming County line.

According to the United States Census Bureau, Pavilion CDP has a total area of 3.3 square miles (8.6 km^{2}), all land. Oatka Creek, a tributary of the Genesee River, flows northward through the western side of the CDP.

== Demographics ==
Historical population
Census	Pop.	Note	%±
2020	664		—
U.S. Decennial Census

== See also ==
- Pavilion, New York, for the town as a whole
