= James Rosebrugh Leaming =

American physician

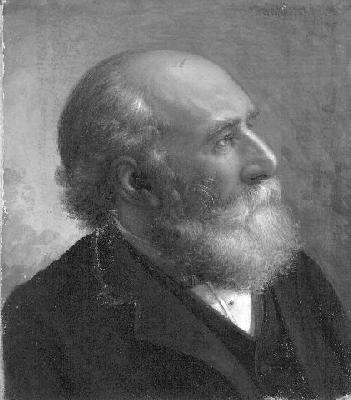
James Rosebrugh Leaming, M.D.

James Rosebrugh Leaming, M.D. (February 25, 1820 – December 5, 1892), was a preeminent physician specializing in heart and lung diseases, author and teacher.

== Life ==
James Rosebrugh Leaming was born in Groveland, New York on February 25, 1820, eldest child of William Leaming and Jane Rosebrugh, granddaughter of Revolutionary war Chaplain Rev. John Rosbrugh. He attended Temple Hill Academy in Geneseo, New York, after which he apprenticed with Drs. Edward and Walter Lauderdale. In 1847 he attended the University of the City of New York, now New York University and received the degree of M.D. in 1849.

Leaming took up residency in New York City where he became well known as a teacher, author, and physician. He specialized in diseases of the heart and lungs and became a renowned authority on the subject. Early in his career his lectures on plural pathology and the interpleural origin of rales initially met with a storm of opposition; but within his lifetime he saw these enjoy widespread acceptance in the medical community.

Leaming was Professor Emeritus both of the Woman's Medical College (University of the City of New York) and the Polytechnic Institute of New York University where he also had served as the first President. He was a member of the New York Academy of Medicine, The New York County Medical Society, The New York State Medical Society, The Pathological Society, and the American Medical Association.

Shortly before his death he was honored by an assembly of distinguished guests in the drawing-room of his home, among whom was then President-elect Grover Cleveland. He died of tuberculosis at home in New York City on December 5, 1892.

== Family ==
Leaming married first, in January 1853, to Jane Helen Cheesman, daughter of Rev. Lewis Cheesman, D.D., of Philadelphia. they had one son, Edward Leaming, who went on to become a physician in New York city like his father. She died June 27, 1865 In November 1868 he married Kathryn Lawton Strobel, daughter of Rev. W.D. Strobel, D.D., of Rhinebeck, NY; they had one daughter, Abby Anna Leaming. His third marriage was to Susan Emilia Nelson, daughter of John G. Nelson, who survived him.

== Works ==
- Cardiac Murmurs, New York Journal of Medicine, 1848
- Respiratory Murmurs, New York Journal of Medicine, 1872
- Transactions of the New York Academy of Medicine, 2nd Series, 1874
- Plastic Exudation within the Pluria, Dry Pleurisy, Brown-Sequard's Archives, 1873
- Haemoptysis, Medical Record, 1874
- Disturbed Action and Functional Murmurs of the heart, Transactions of the New York Academy of Medicine, 2nd Series, 1876
- Fibroid Phthisis, read before the New York Academy of Medicine, 1876
- Physical Signs of Interpleural Pathological Processes (Reprinted from the Medical Record, May 25, 1878)
- Memoir of George P. Cammann, M.D.; Read before the New York Academy of Medicine, October 21st, 1863 (E.P. Dutton & Co., Boston, 1864)
- Contributions to the study of the heart and lungs (E.B. Treat, New York, 1887)
