= Sparta First Presbyterian Church =

Historic church in New York, United States

- U.S. National Register of Historic Places
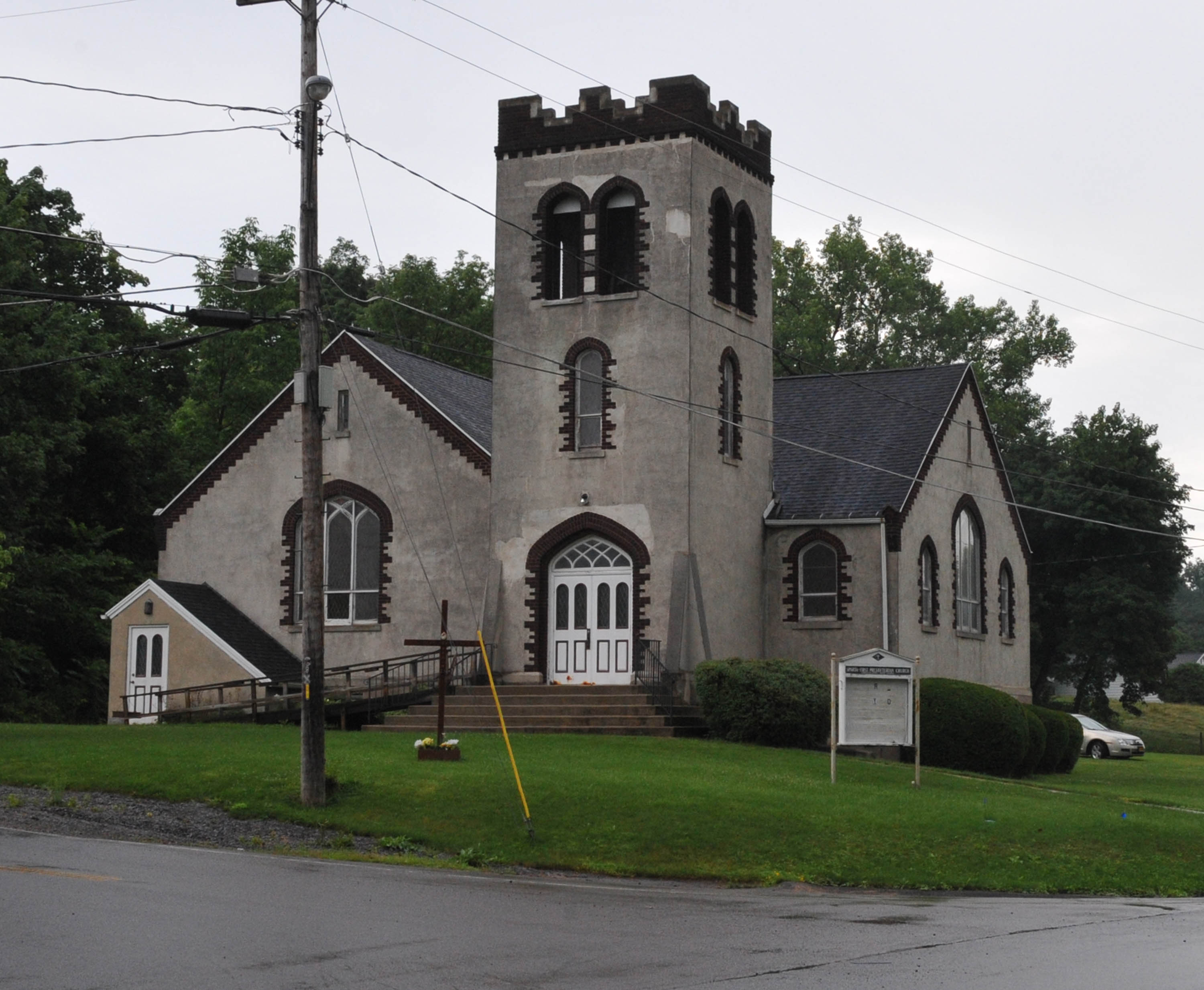
- Sparta First Presbyterian Church, January 2008

- Location within New York Location within the United States
- Location: 4687 Scottsburg Rd., Groveland Station, New York
- Coordinates: 42°39′53″N 77°45′59″W
- Area: 1 acre (0.40 ha)
- Built: 1915
- Architect: Otis W. Dryer
- Architectural style: Late Gothic Revival
- NRHP reference No.: 06001209
- Added to NRHP: January 23, 2007

Sparta First Presbyterian Church is a historic Presbyterian church located at Groveland Station in Livingston County, New York. The building is a simple but sophisticated combination of Arts and Crafts principals and freely styled Tudor Gothic detailing executed with modern building materials. It was constructed in 1915-1916 and is composed of a large principal gable block with a gabled wing. It features a crenellated tower rising a full story above the ridgeline of the roofs.

It was listed on the National Register of Historic Places in 2007.
