= New York State Route 63 =

State highway in the western part of New York in the United States

New York State Route 63
- Map of western New York with NY 63 highlighted in red

Route information
- Maintained by NYSDOT and the village of Medina
- Length: 82.11 mi (132.14 km)
- Existed: 1930–present

Major junctions
- South end: NY 15 / NY 21 in Wayland
- US 20A / NY 39 in Geneseo; US 20 in Pavilion; NY 5 / NY 33 in Batavia; NY 31 in Medina
- North end: NY 18 in Yates

Location
- Country: United States
- State: New York
- Counties: Steuben, Livingston, Wyoming, Genesee, Orleans

Highway system
- New York Highways; Interstate; US; State; Reference; Parkways
← NY 62A	→ NY 63A
← NY 36	NY 36A	→ NY 37

New York State Route 63 (NY 63) is a state highway in the western part of New York in the United States. It extends for 82.11 miles (132.14 km) in a generally southeast–northwest direction from an intersection with NY 15 and NY 21 in the village of Wayland in Steuben County to a junction with NY 18 in the town of Yates in Orleans County, 2 miles (3.2 km) south of the Lake Ontario shoreline. The route passes through the city of Batavia and enters or comes near several villages, including Dansville and Medina.

NY 63 was assigned as part of the 1930 renumbering of state highways in New York, but to a largely different routing than it follows today. The original alignment of NY 63 was identical to its current alignment between Mount Morris and Pavilion; however, the route deviated significantly from its modern routing past those points as it extended southwest from Mount Morris to Hinsdale and north from Pavilion to Hamlin. It was rerouted north of Pavilion c. 1939 and south of Mount Morris in the early 1940s. The latter realignment supplanted New York State Route 36A, a Dansville–Mount Morris highway assigned in 1930. For a brief period during the 1970s, NY 63 began in Dansville instead of Wayland.

== Route description ==
=== Wayland to Geneseo ===
NY 63 begins at a four-way intersection with NY 15 and NY 21 in the village of Wayland, located in northern Steuben County. It heads west through the village on the two-lane West Naples Street to a less developed part of the town of Wayland, where it parallels Interstate 390 (I-390) on the north side of a wide valley. The route soon enters Livingston County and the town of North Dansville, gaining the name Main Street as it bends northwestward into the village of Dansville. Here, it overlaps with NY 36 for one block through the village center, beginning at Clara Barton Street and ending at Ossian Street. After another block, NY 63 meets the south end of NY 256 at Perine Street. While NY 256 heads north toward Conesus Lake, NY 63 proceeds northwest past Dansville Municipal Airport and out of the village limits.

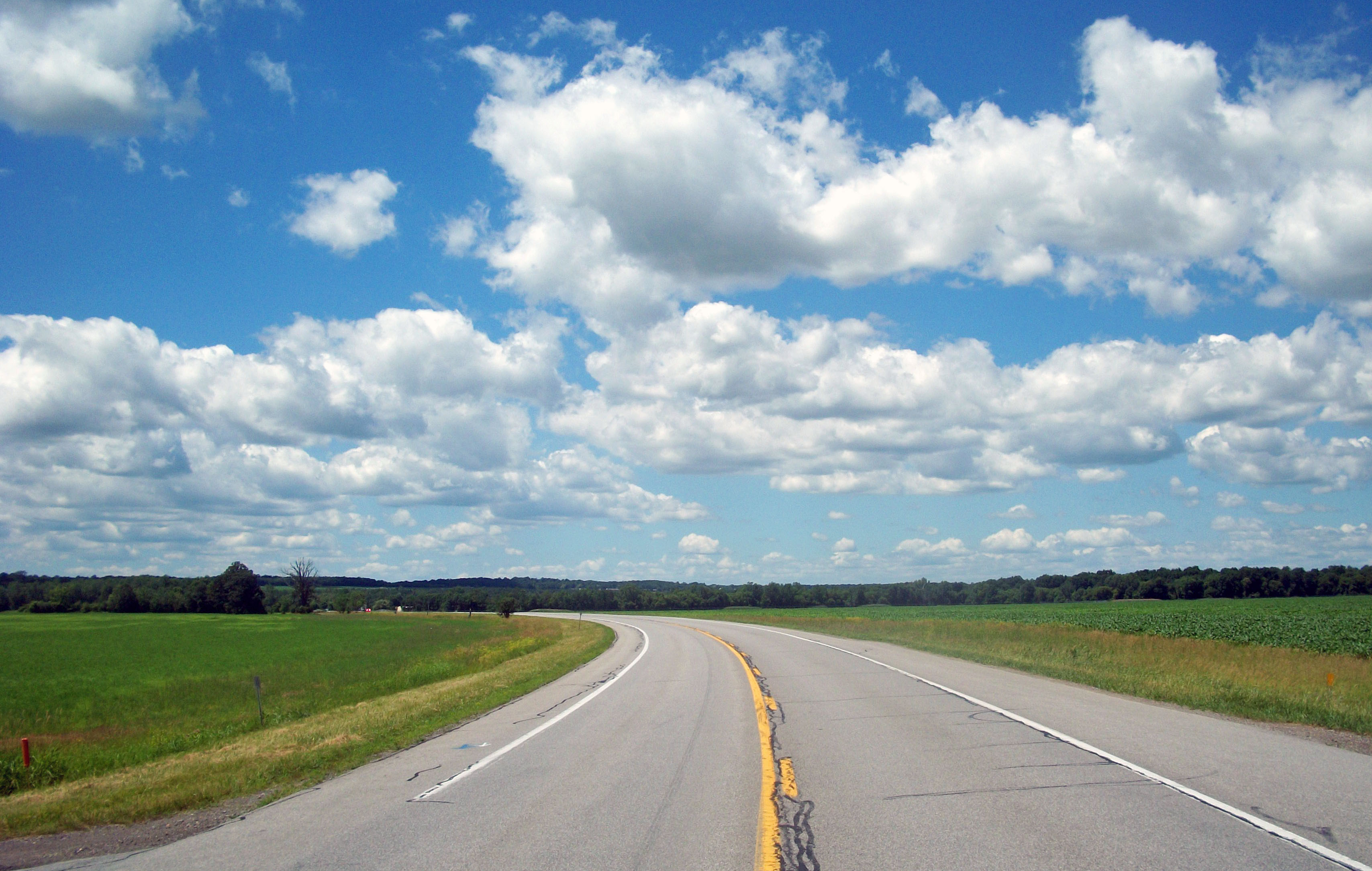
Flats along NY 63 north of Geneseo

Continuing north into the town of Sparta, NY 63 runs along the east side of a wide, rural valley surrounding Canaseraga Creek, with NY 36 and I-390 following the west side. The route eventually reaches the town of Groveland and hamlet of Groveland Station, where NY 258, a connector to NY 36, comes in from the west at the town line. Another long, open stretch brings the route to the vicinity of the village of Mount Morris, where it runs much closer to I-390 and indirectly connects to the expressway by way of NY 408 at Hampton Corners. From this point north, the road becomes busier as NY 63 is the primary route to the village of Geneseo for northbound traffic on I-390 itself, as there is no exit at the point where the expressway crosses under NY 63. I-390 ultimately bypasses Geneseo to the southeast while NY 63 heads north toward the village, briefly joining with U.S. Route 20A (US 20A) and NY 39 just outside the village limits.

=== Geneseo to Batavia ===
The highway enters Geneseo from the south, taking the name Genesee Street as it passes the western edge of the campus of SUNY Geneseo. At the edge of the campus, the route crosses the Genesee River and exits Geneseo. Past the river in the town of York, NY 63 begins to curve northwest up and out of the Genesee River valley until it runs east–west once again at the hamlet of Piffard. The major junction in York is the community of Greigsville, where NY 63 reconnects with NY 36. This next section of highway has become a major shortcut for traffic heading to the Buffalo area, despite remaining a two-lane road through open rural country, since it is both physically shorter than going all the way to the New York State Thruway as well as toll-free. Most of this Buffalo-bound traffic follows NY 36 north from Mount Morris and turns on to NY 63 here. Signage along this route reflects this use.

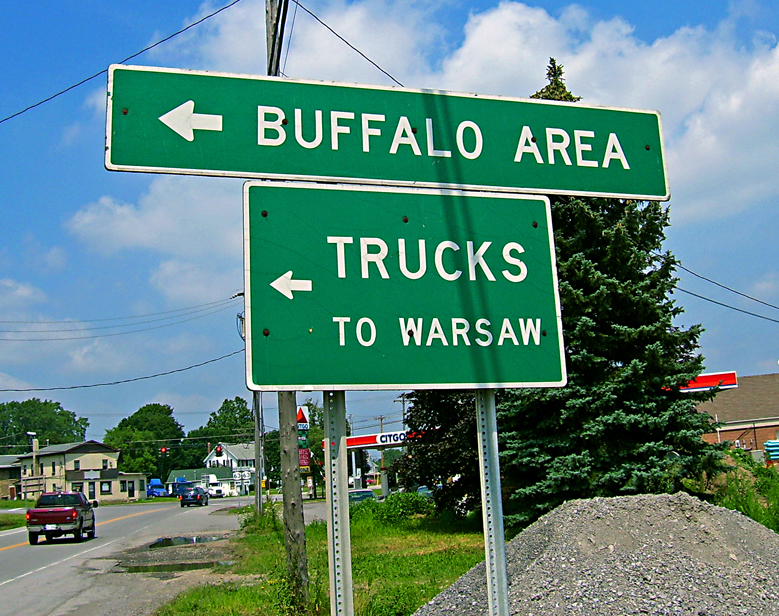
Sign at Greigsville directing Buffalo-bound traffic onto NY 63 from NY 36

From Greigsville, the route heads west through open land into the northeast corner of Wyoming County and the town of Covington. At Peoria, the highway turns to head due northwest, its direction for the next 30 miles (48 km). The bend at Peoria was once a sharp, accident-prone turn known as Peoria Curve; however, the route has been slightly realigned to the north to create a longer, more gradual curve. From Peoria, NY 63 runs across rolling, open terrain to the Genesee County line and the town of Pavilion. Just past the county line, the route connects to the northern end of NY 246. A mile (1.6 km) beyond, NY 63 drops down slightly to intersect with NY 19 at the hamlet of Pavilion. After the traffic light at the center of the hamlet, NY 63 crosses Oatka Creek and climbs back up out of the Wyoming Valley.

Once atop the hill, it continues due northwest to its next junction, the underdeveloped crossing of US 20. Here at least some Buffalo-bound traffic will turn west. Eventually acquiring the name Ellicott Street, NY 63 crosses sparsely populated parts of the towns of Bethany and Batavia on its way to the city of Batavia. The route passes under the Depew, Lancaster and Western Railroad and the CSX Transportation-owned Rochester Subdivision rail line on its way into downtown, where it intersects the two major east–west trunk routes in this corridor, NY 5 and NY 33. It overlaps with both roads for several blocks along Main Street, with NY 33 splitting off at Oak Street. This junction is also where NY 63 meets the north–south NY 98, which connects to the Thruway just north of the city.

=== Batavia to Yates ===
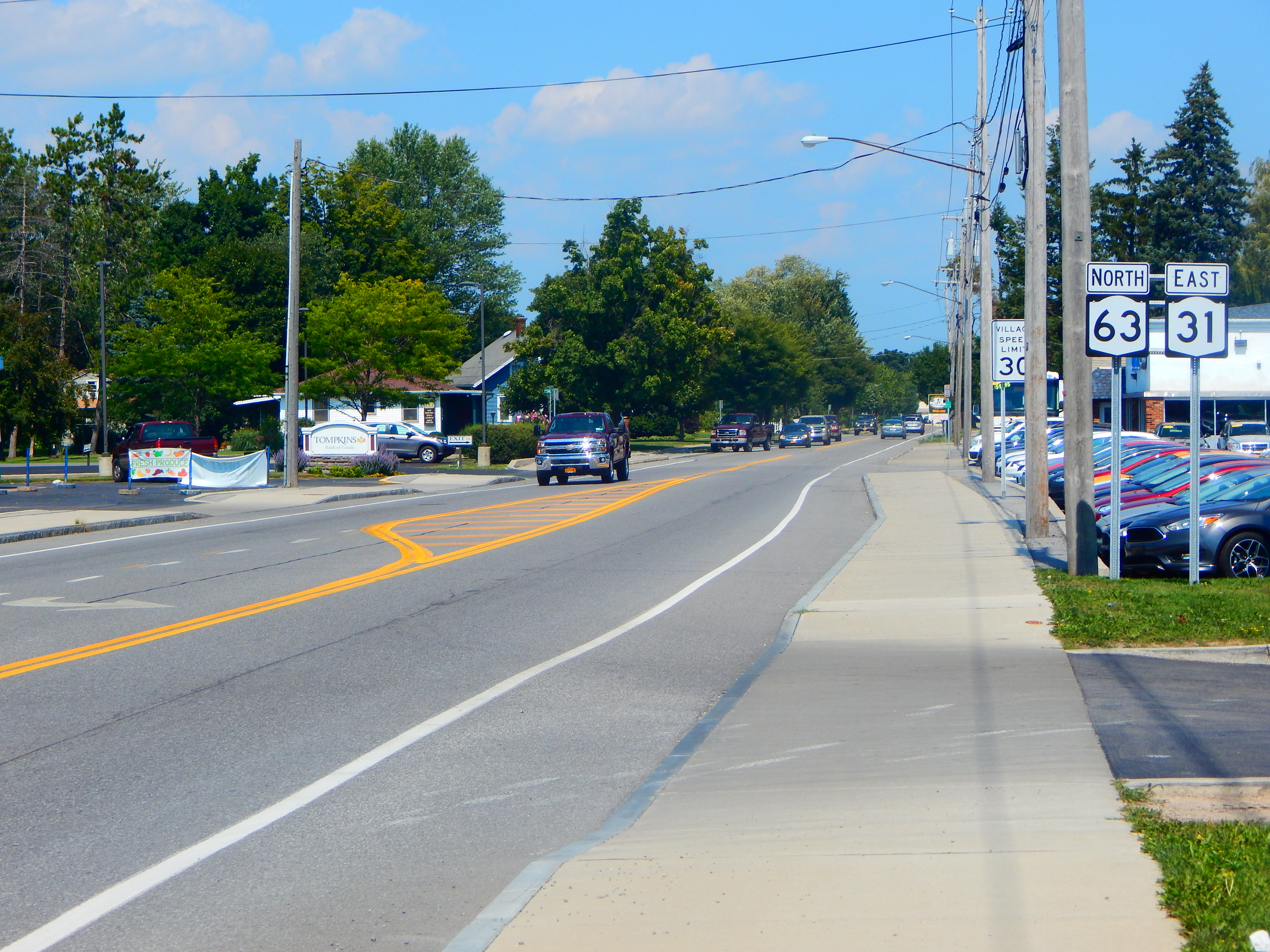
NY 63 and NY 31 north through Medina village

NY 63 forks from NY 5 at the western city line, returning to the town of Batavia, changing names to Lewiston Road as it passes by Batavia Downs and runs northwest from downtown. The highway crosses over the Thruway with no access to the highway on its way across another rural stretch leading to the village of Oakfield, located in the town of the same name, where NY 262 departs to the east. Just north of Oakfield, NY 63 turns due west on Judge Road, with Lewiston Road continuing northwest as County Route 12 (CR 12). NY 63 follows Judge Road into the town of Alabama, passing through the hamlet of South Alabama on its way to an undeveloped junction with NY 77 north of Basom. NY 63 turns north here, overlapping with NY 77 for 1.5 miles (2.4 km) to the hamlet of Alabama. In the center of the community, NY 63 reconnects to CR 12, and NY 77 turns west to follow the county road to the Niagara County line.

Past Alabama, NY 63 continues northward across the Iroquois National Wildlife Refuge and into Orleans County. It traverses open, undeveloped areas of the town of Shelby to reach the village of Medina. This village begins at a junction with NY 31 and NY 31A. The latter highway continues eastward while the former joins NY 63 through the village's historic central district on Main Street. At Center Street, NY 31E comes in from the west and NY 31 leaves NY 63 to continue east. NY 63 continues northwest on Main and Commercial streets to the edge of the village, where it turns northward onto Prospect Avenue and subsequently crosses over the Erie Canal. The northernmost two blocks of the overlap with NY 31 are maintained by the village of Medina, as are the two blocks of Main Street leading away from the north end of the concurrency. This is the only segment of NY 63 not maintained by the New York State Department of Transportation (NYSDOT).

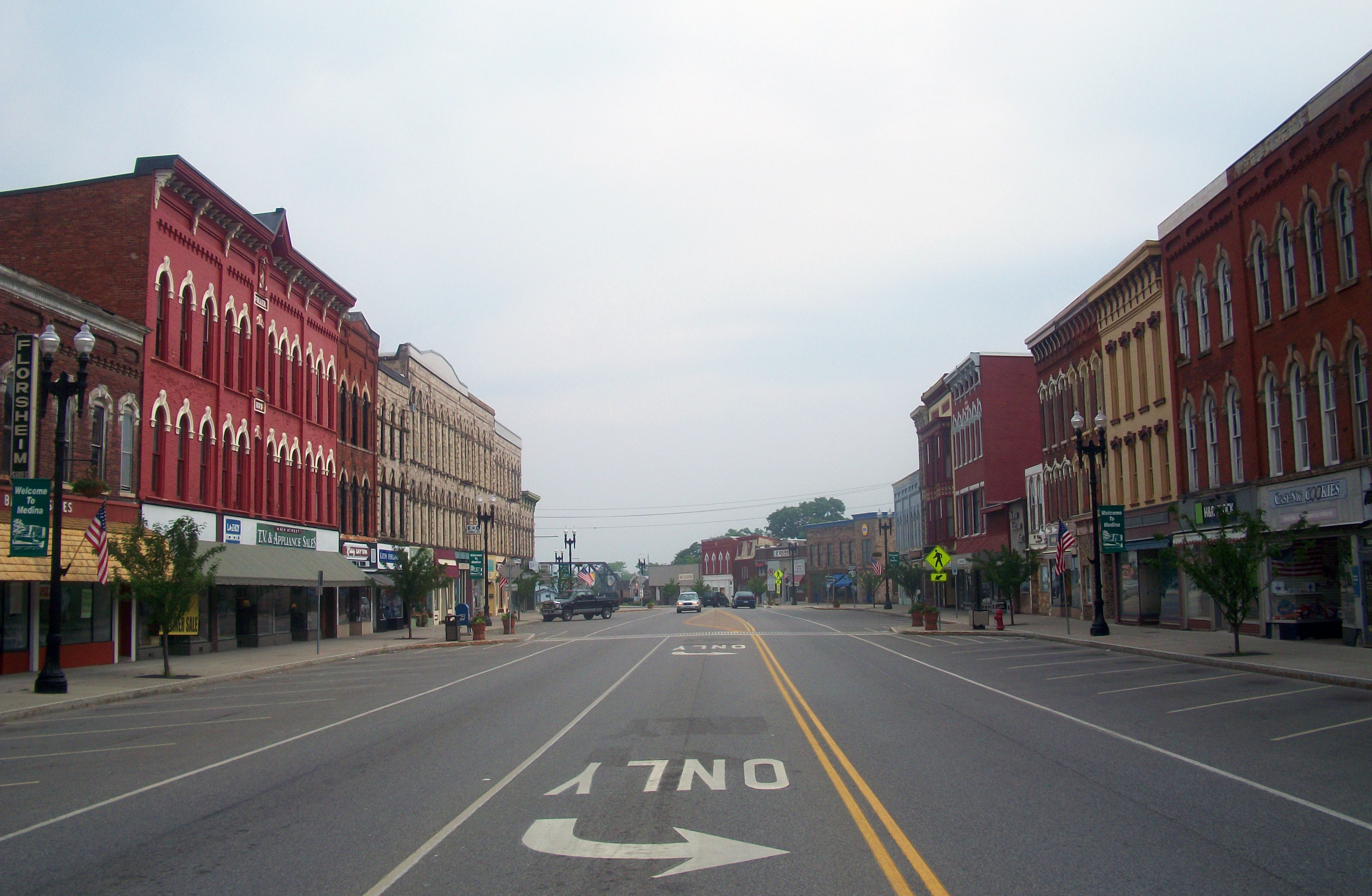
NY 63 northbound in Medina

For the next 3 miles (4.8 km), the highway serves a stretch of scattered homes along the western bank of Oak Orchard Creek. It traverses a mix of fields and forests to reach the town and hamlet of Ridgeway, the latter located at NY 63's junction with NY 104. NY 63 briefly overlaps the east–west trunk road before resuming a northerly, downhill alignment toward the town of Yates. The route passes through the village of Lyndonville as Main Street, crossing over Johnson Creek in the center of the community before intersecting NY 18 about 1.5 miles (2.4 km) north of the village limits in the hamlet of Yates Center. NY 63 ends here while the highway continues north toward Lake Ontario as Lyndonville Road.

== History ==
=== Origins and designation ===
The New York State Legislature created a statewide system of unsigned legislative routes in 1908, with two of the routes using parts of what is now NY 63. The stretch of NY 63 connecting Dansville to Hampton Corners in the town of Mount Morris became part of Route 15, a highway continuing south to Hornell and north through Mount Morris to Caledonia. Farther north, the piece between Medina and Ridgeway was designated as part of Route 30, a cross-state route running from Niagara Falls to Rouses Point. Route 30 originally followed current NY 31 to Rochester; however, it was realigned on March 1, 1921, to use Ridge Road instead, bypassing the Medina–Ridgeway highway.

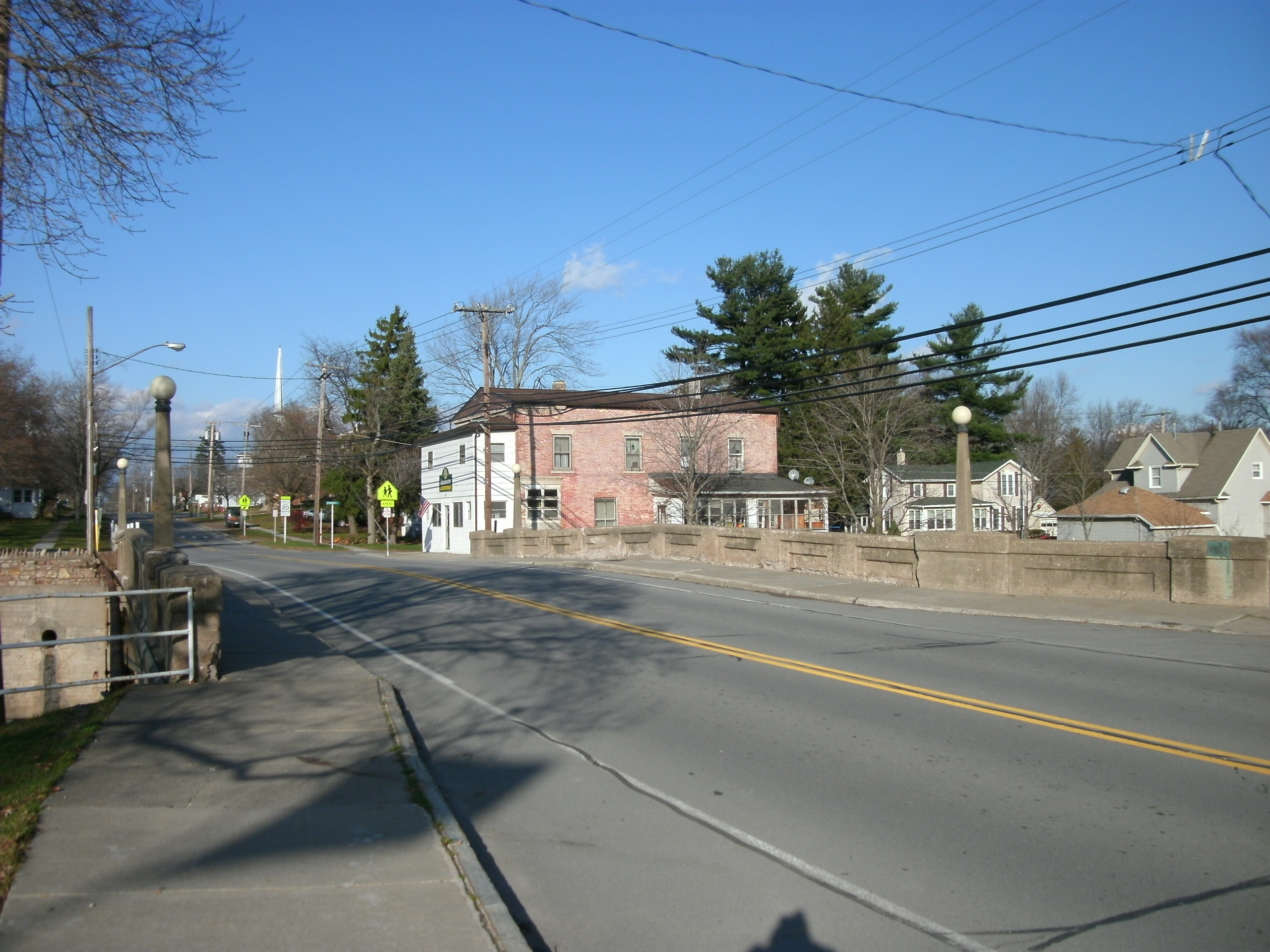
NY 63 northbound at Johnson Creek in Lyndonville

In the mid-1920s, three sections of modern NY 63 received posted route numbers for the first time. From Wayland to Dansville, the road was the westernmost part of NY 52. What is now NY 63 was unnumbered from Dansville northwest to Hampton Corners, where NY 36 entered from the west on current NY 408 and followed the path of NY 63 to Geneseo. The road was unnumbered again until Pavilion, at which point NY 62 joined from the south and utilized all of current NY 63 and CR 63-1 to reach the Lake Ontario shoreline in Yates. By 1926, all numbered portions of current NY 63 were state-maintained, as were the unnumbered parts from Geneseo to Piffard and from Groveland to Hampton Corners.

NY 63 was assigned as part of the 1930 renumbering of state highways in New York. The initial routing of NY 63 was significantly different from its modern alignment; in fact, the only portion of modern NY 63 that still follows its original alignment is the section between Hampton Corners and Pavilion. South of Mount Morris, the route followed what is now NY 408 to Dalton and continued south on Old State Road and west on Allegany County's CR 16 to NY 19 west of the village of Angelica. NY 63 overlapped NY 19 south to Belvidere, where NY 63 turned onto modern CR 20. It continued west on CR 20 and NY 446 through Cuba to a junction with NY 16 in Hinsdale, where it ended. North of Pavilion, NY 63 followed modern NY 19 to the Lake Ontario shoreline in Hamlin.

=== Alignment changes ===
The portion of what is now NY 63 north of Pavilion was designated as part of NY 19 in the 1930 renumbering. However, unlike current NY 63, NY 19 continued north for another 2 miles (3.2 km) on Lyndonville Road past NY 18 to the Lake Ontario shoreline. South of Mount Morris, modern NY 63 was designated as NY 36A from Mount Morris to Dansville. From Dansville to Wayland, the highway was part of NY 39 (later NY 245), a new route that replaced NY 52 in the 1930 renumbering. The first change to NY 63 came c. 1939 when the alignments of NY 19 and NY 63 were swapped, placing both routes on their modern alignments. NY 63 was altered again in December 1940 to follow the former routing of NY 36A south from Mount Morris to Dansville, from where it continued east to Wayland by way of an overlap with NY 245.

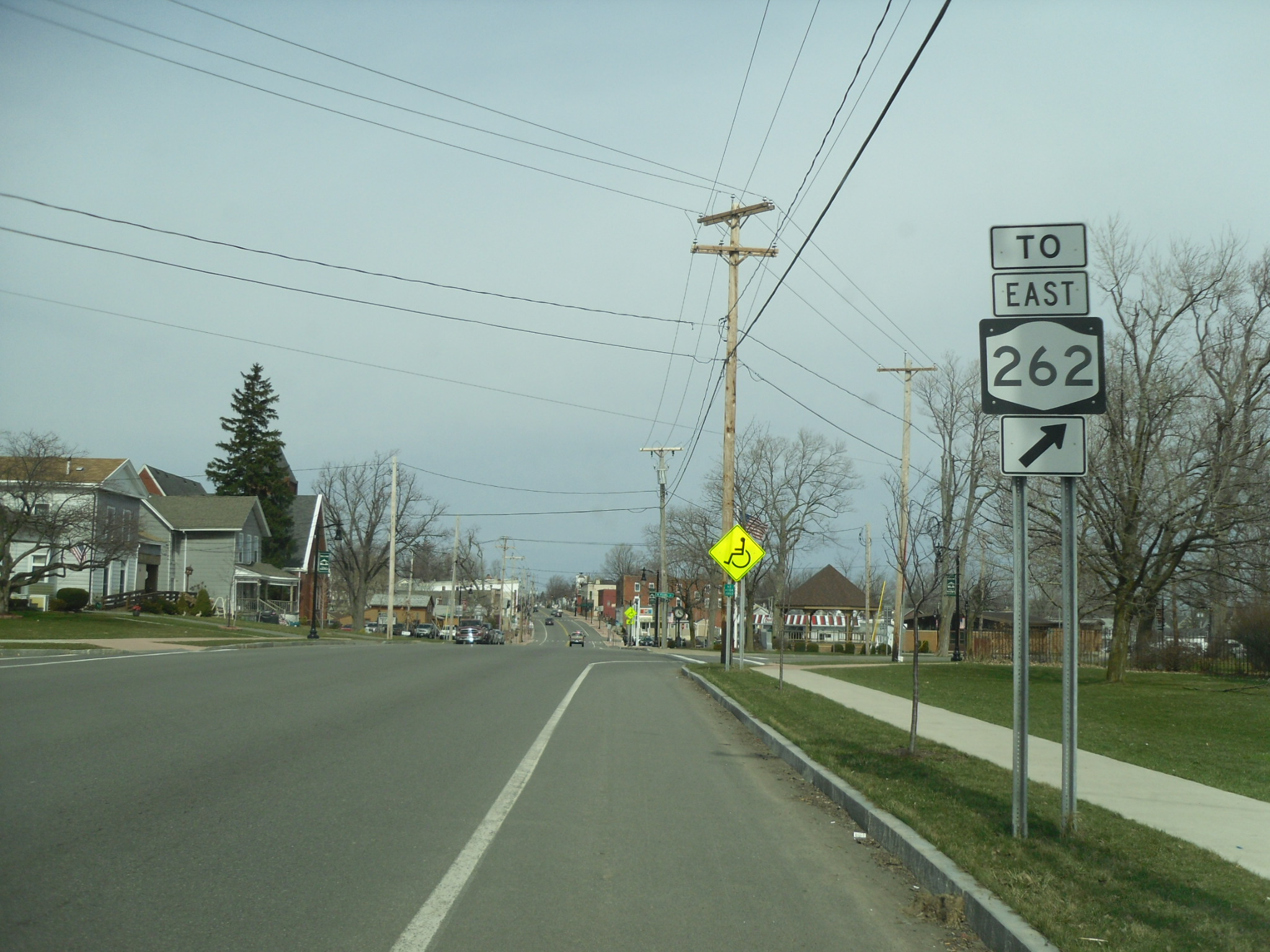
NY 63 north near NY 262 in Oakfield

NY 245 was truncated northeastward to Naples c. 1972 and NY 63 was cut back to NY 36 in Dansville around the same time, leaving the Dansville–Wayland highway as an unsigned reference route. This was partially reversed in the late 1970s or early 1980s when NY 63 was reextended to Wayland. On April 1, 1989, ownership and maintenance of Lyndonville Road north of NY 18 was transferred from the state of New York to Orleans County as part of a highway maintenance swap between the two levels of government. NY 63 was truncated to end at its junction with NY 18 while its former routing to the lake became CR 63-1.

In the mid-2000s, the route was reconfigured in the northern part of Medina to use Main and Commercial streets instead of Center Street and Prospect Avenue. The change was made as part of a village project known as the Pass Thru Project, and the realignment eliminated a three-block overlap with the easternmost part of NY 31E on Center Street. Ownership and maintenance of NY 63's former alignment was transferred from the state to the village on July 1, 2010, as part of a highway maintenance swap that gave Commercial Street and the northernmost block of Main Street to the state.

=== Proposed Mount Morris–Pavilion bypass ===
As part of a large scale study in the early 2000s, NYSDOT determined that NY 63 from Mount Morris to Pavilion, along with US 20 and NY 77—termed the "Route 63 Corridor"—were major trouble routes, primarily because of increased truck traffic using the corridor as a bypass between I-390 in Mount Morris and the New York State Thruway in Pembroke. The most publicized and perhaps most fought-over possibility mentioned was that of a new expressway from Mount Morris to Pembroke, bypassing these three routes. The Wyoming County Chamber of Commerce was a driving force behind this, hoping interchanges in Perry, Warsaw and Attica would promote business growth.

While residents along the NY 63 corridor are against the increased truck traffic along the corridor (spurred by the North American Free Trade Agreement), most of those same residents, along with other groups, also fought the proposed expressway. The general consensus of all of these groups is that NYSDOT should impose restrictions on the NY 63 corridor and force trucks to remain on I-390 and the Thruway to travel between Buffalo and Pennsylvania.

== NY 63A ==
New York State Route 63A
- Location: Angelica–Nunda
- Existed: 1930–early 1940s

NY 63A was an alternate route of NY 63 between Angelica, Allegany County, and Nunda, Livingston County. The route was assigned as part of the 1930 renumbering and redesignated as NY 408A in the early 1940s.

== Major intersections ==
County	Location	mi	km	Destinations	Notes
Steuben	Village of Wayland	0.00	0.00	NY 15 / NY 21 – Rochester, Hornell	Southern terminus
Livingston	Dansville	6.29	10.12	NY 36 south to I-390	Southern terminus of NY 36 / NY 63 overlap
Livingston	Dansville	6.42	10.33	NY 36 north	Northern terminus of NY 36 / NY 63 overlap
Livingston	Dansville	6.51	10.48	NY 256 north	Southern terminus of NY 256
Livingston	Town of Groveland	14.43	23.22	NY 258 west	Eastern terminus of NY 258; hamlet of Groveland Station
Livingston	Town of Groveland	21.05	33.88	NY 408 south to I-390 – Mount Morris	Northern terminus of NY 408; hamlet of Hampton Corners
Livingston	Town of Geneseo	24.05	38.70	US 20A west / NY 39 west – Leicester, Cuylerville, Letchworth, Warsaw	Southern terminus of US 20A / NY 63 and NY 39 / NY 63 overlaps
Livingston	Town of Geneseo	24.36	39.20	US 20A east / NY 39 east – Geneseo	Northern terminus of US 20A / NY 63 and NY 39 / NY 63 overlaps
Livingston	Village of Geneseo	24.96	40.17	To US 20A east – Geneseo via Mary Jemison Drive ( NY 942D)	Western terminus of unsigned NY 942D; to US 20A east only signed southbound
Livingston	Town of Geneseo	25.65	41.28	Court Street ( NY 941K)	Western terminus of unsigned NY 941K
Livingston	Town of York	30.26	48.70	NY 36	Hamlet of Greigsville
Genesee	Town of Pavilion	36.92	59.42	NY 246 south – Perry, Letchworth State Park	Northern terminus of NY 246
Genesee	Town of Pavilion	37.89	60.98	NY 19 – Warsaw, Leroy	Hamlet of Pavilion
Genesee	Town of Pavilion	40.90	65.82	US 20 – Darien Lake, Buffalo, Avon	Hamlet of Texaco Town
Genesee	Batavia	49.83	80.19	NY 5 east / NY 33 east	Eastern terminus of NY 5 / NY 63 and NY 33 / NY 63 overlaps
Genesee	Batavia	50.10	80.63	NY 33 west / NY 98 to I-90 / New York Thruway	Western terminus of NY 33 / NY 63 overlap
Genesee	Batavia	50.85	81.84	NY 5 west – Buffalo	Western terminus of NY 5 / NY 63 overlap
Genesee	Village of Oakfield	56.23	90.49	NY 262 east	Western terminus of NY 262
Genesee	Alabama	62.57	100.70	NY 77 south to I-90 – Corfu	Southern terminus of NY 63 / NY 77 overlap
Genesee	Alabama	64.06	103.09	NY 77 north – Lockport	Northern terminus of NY 63 / NY 77 overlap; hamlet of Alabama
Orleans	Medina	71.80	115.55	NY 31 west / NY 31A east	Southern terminus of NY 31 / NY 63 overlap; western terminus of NY 31A
Orleans	Medina	72.76	117.10	NY 31 east / NY 31E west	Northern terminus of NY 31/ NY 63 overlap; eastern terminus of NY 31E
Orleans	Ridgeway	76.34	122.86	NY 104 west – Niagara Falls	Western terminus of NY 63 / NY 104 overlap
Orleans	Ridgeway	76.50	123.11	NY 104 east – Rochester	Eastern terminus of NY 63 / NY 104 overlap
Orleans	Yates	82.11	132.14	NY 18	Northern terminus, Hamlet of Yates Center
1.000 mi = 1.609 km; 1.000 km = 0.621 mi: Concurrency terminus

== See also ==
- List of county routes in Orleans County, New York
