= New York State Route 256 =

State highway in Livingston County, New York, US

New York State Route 256
- Map of Livingston County in the Finger Lakes Region of New York with NY 256 highlighted in red

Route information
- Maintained by NYSDOT
- Length: 21.08 mi (33.92 km)
- Existed: 1930–present

Major junctions
- South end: NY 63 in Dansville
- US 20A on Geneseo–Livonia town line
- North end: NY 15 on Geneseo–Livonia town line

Location
- Country: United States
- State: New York
- Counties: Livingston

Highway system
- New York Highways; Interstate; US; State; Reference; Parkways
← NY 255	→ NY 257

New York State Route 256 (NY 256) is a north–south state highway located within Livingston County, New York, in the United States. It extends for 21.08 miles (33.92 km) across mostly rural terrain from an intersection with NY 63 in the village of Dansville to a junction with NY 15 on the Geneseo–Livonia town line. The northern half of NY 256, named West Lake Road, passes along the western shore of Conesus Lake. NY 256 was assigned as part of the 1930 renumbering of state highways in New York to an alignment extending from Groveland to modern U.S. Route 20A (US 20A) west of Lakeville. It was extended north to its current northern terminus c. 1940 and south to Dansville in stages during the 1930s and 1940s.

== Route description ==
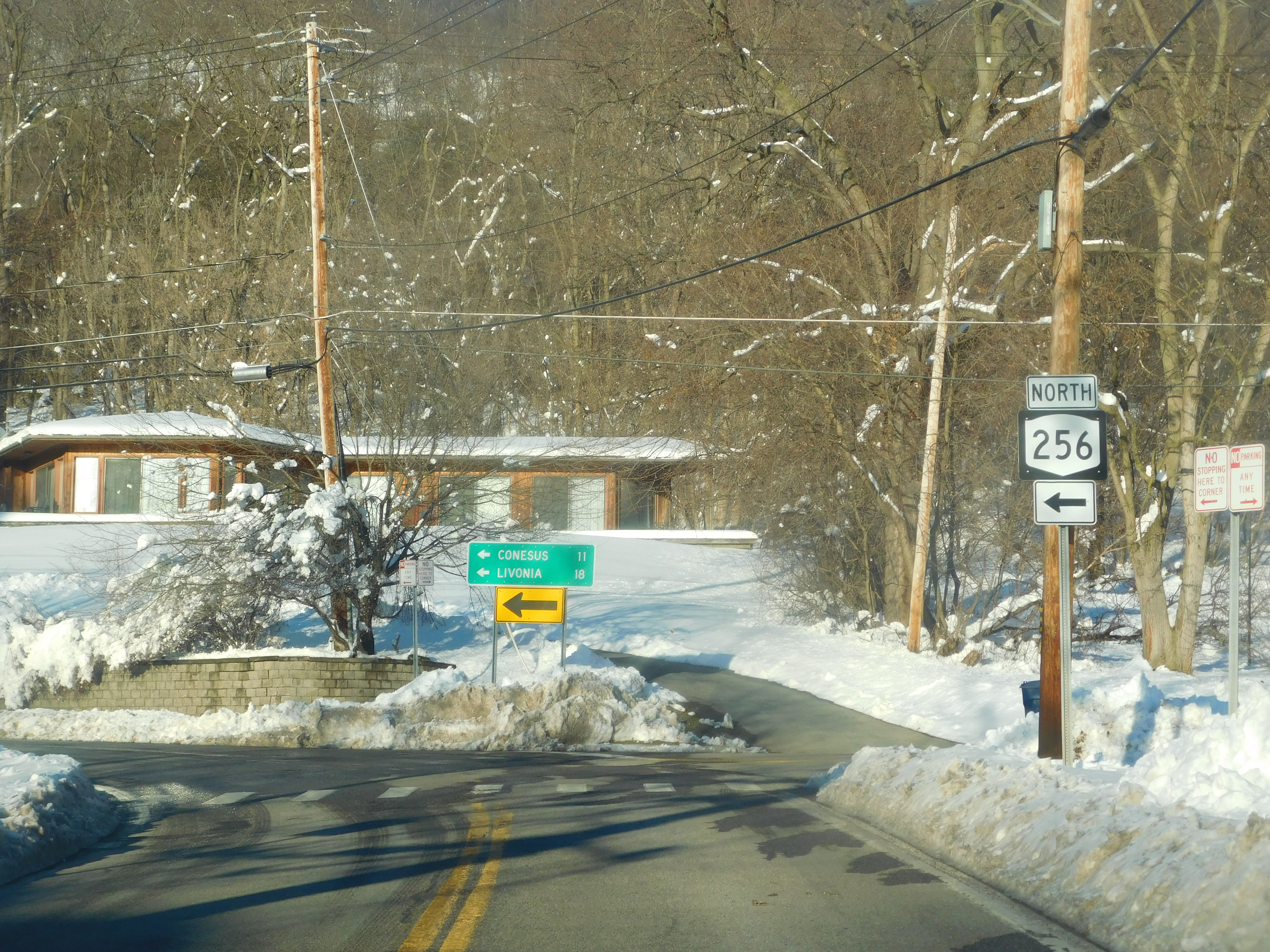
NY 256 through Dansville

NY 256 begins at an intersection with NY 63 in the village of Dansville. It initially heads northeastward on Perine Street, following it past five residential blocks to a junction with Health Street on the northeastern edge of the village. Perine Street ends here; however, NY 256 continues to the north on Health Street, following the street out of both Dansville and the Canaseraga Creek valley that contains the village. Outside of the valley, the route travels north through the rural towns of North Dansville and Sparta, passing by farmland on its way to a junction with County Route 71 (CR 71), once designated as NY 255. While CR 71 heads northeast toward the hamlet of Conesus, NY 256 continues northwest to serve Scottsburg, a small community in the far northwestern corner of the town of Sparta.

North of Scottsburg, NY 256 heads into the town of Conesus and enters the south end of the Conesus Lake valley. Here, it follows the west bank of Conesus Inlet past a marshy area that eventually leads to the southern end of Conesus Lake. The route continues on, following the western lakeshore through the towns of Groveland and Geneseo as West Lake Road. Along this stretch, NY 256 serves many lakeside homes and communities. At Graywood, a community 1.75 miles (2.82 km) south of the lake's north end, NY 256 joins the Geneseo–Livonia town line and follows it for the remainder of its routing. From this point north, the route traverses lightly populated areas dominated by farmland. NY 256 crosses US 20A west of Lakeville—a hamlet situated at the northern tip of Conesus Lake—before ending about 1.5 miles (2.4 km) later at a junction with NY 15.

== History ==
NY 256 was assigned as part of the 1930 renumbering of state highways in New York. It initially began at NY 36A (now NY 63) in the hamlet of Groveland and followed Scottsburg Road east to Scottsburg, where it turned north to follow West Lake Road to a terminus at NY 254 (now US 20A) west of Lakeville. NY 256 was rerouted c. 1936 to follow a new highway connecting Scottsburg to NY 255 southeast of the hamlet. The route was extended north to US 15 (modern NY 15) c. 1940 and south to Dansville by way of NY 255 in December 1940. NY 255 was then truncated to its junction with NY 256. On April 1, 1983, ownership and maintenance of NY 256 between NY 63 and Depot Road (three blocks north of Perine Street) in Dansville was transferred from Livingston County to the state of New York as part of a highway maintenance swap between the two levels of government.

== Major intersections ==
The entire route is in Livingston County.

Location	mi	km	Destinations	Notes
Dansville	0.00	0.00	NY 63 to NY 36	Southern terminus
Sparta	5.32	8.56	CR 71 – Conesus, Livonia	Former southern terminus of NY 255
Geneseo–Livonia town line	19.68	31.67	US 20A – Geneseo, Lakeville, Livonia	
Geneseo–Livonia town line	21.08	33.92	NY 15 – Lakeville, Livonia, Avon	Northern terminus
1.000 mi = 1.609 km; 1.000 km = 0.621 mi
