= Groveland, New York =

Town in New York, United States

- Town
- Location within the state of New York Groveland (the United States)
- Coordinates: 42°39′53″N 77°46′11″W
- Country: United States
- State: New York
- County: Livingston
- Settled: 1792
- Incorporated: 1789

Government
  - Type: Town Council
  - Town Supervisor: William G. Devine (R)

Area
  - Total: 39.86 sq mi (103.24 km^{2})
  - Land: 39.14 sq mi (101.36 km^{2})
  - Water: 0.73 sq mi (1.88 km^{2})
- Elevation: 1,053 ft (321 m)

Population (2020)
  - Total: 2,409
  - Estimate (2016): 3,361
  - Density: 85.9/sq mi (33.16/km^{2})
- Time zone: UTC-5 (EDT)
  - Summer (DST): UTC-4 (EDT)
- ZIP Codes: 14462 (Groveland); 14556 (Sonyea); 14435 (Conesus); 14437 (Dansville); 14454 (Geneseo); 14510 (Mount Morris)
- Area code: 585
- FIPS code: 36-051-31016
- GNIS feature ID: 0979029
- Website: grovelandny.gov

Groveland is a town in Livingston County, New York, United States. The population was 2,409 at the 2020 census. The town is centrally located in the county, south of Geneseo.

== History ==
The Sullivan Expedition (1779) reached its farthest extent here. Groveland was the site of the Boyd and Parker ambush.

In 1792, the first planned European American settlement in Livingston County was located in Groveland and was called "Willamsburgh" after Sir William Pulteney, a land speculator. The town was formed in 1789 as part of Ontario County, later becoming part of Livingston County when it was formed in 1821. Part of Groveland was used to form part of the town of Conesus (1819).

The Groveland Shaker Village settlement was established in 1836 on a 1,700-acre (690 ha) farm at the hamlet of Sonyea. Their peak in population was 148 members that year, when they moved from their former location at Sodus. The Shakers sold the Sonyea property in 1892 due to declining membership, and moved to Watervliet. Their former buildings and land became the Craig Colony for Epileptics in 1896 and are now part of the Groveland Correctional Facility.

The Claud No. 1 Archeological Site was added to the National Register of Historic Places in 1975. The Boyd & Parker Park and Groveland Ambuscade were also listed on the National Register in 2009.

== Notable people ==
- Josiah Begole (1815–1896), former governor of Michigan; born in Groveland
- Charles H. Carroll (1794–1865), Whig congressman for New York, 1843–47
- John Vance Cheney (1848–1922), poet, essayist and librarian; born in Groveland
- Charles A. Goheen (1843–1899), Medal of Honor recipient in the American Civil War
- Daniel Kelly (1841–1912), Medal of Honor recipient in the American Civil War
- James Rosebrugh Leaming (1820–1892), noted physician specializing in heart and lung diseases, author, and teacher
- Walter W. Magee (1861–1927), Republican congressman for New York, 1915–27
- Elizabeth Smith Miller (1822–1911), dress reformer and women's rights activist; native of Groveland

== Geography ==
According to the United States Census Bureau, the town has a total area of 39.8 square miles (103.2 km^{2}), of which 39.2 square miles (101.4 km^{2}) are land and 0.73 square miles (1.9 km^{2}), or 1.82%, are water. Conesus Lake, one of the Finger Lakes, forms part of the eastern boundary. Canaseraga Creek, a north-flowing tributary of the Genesee River, crosses the southwest part of the town through a broad valley.

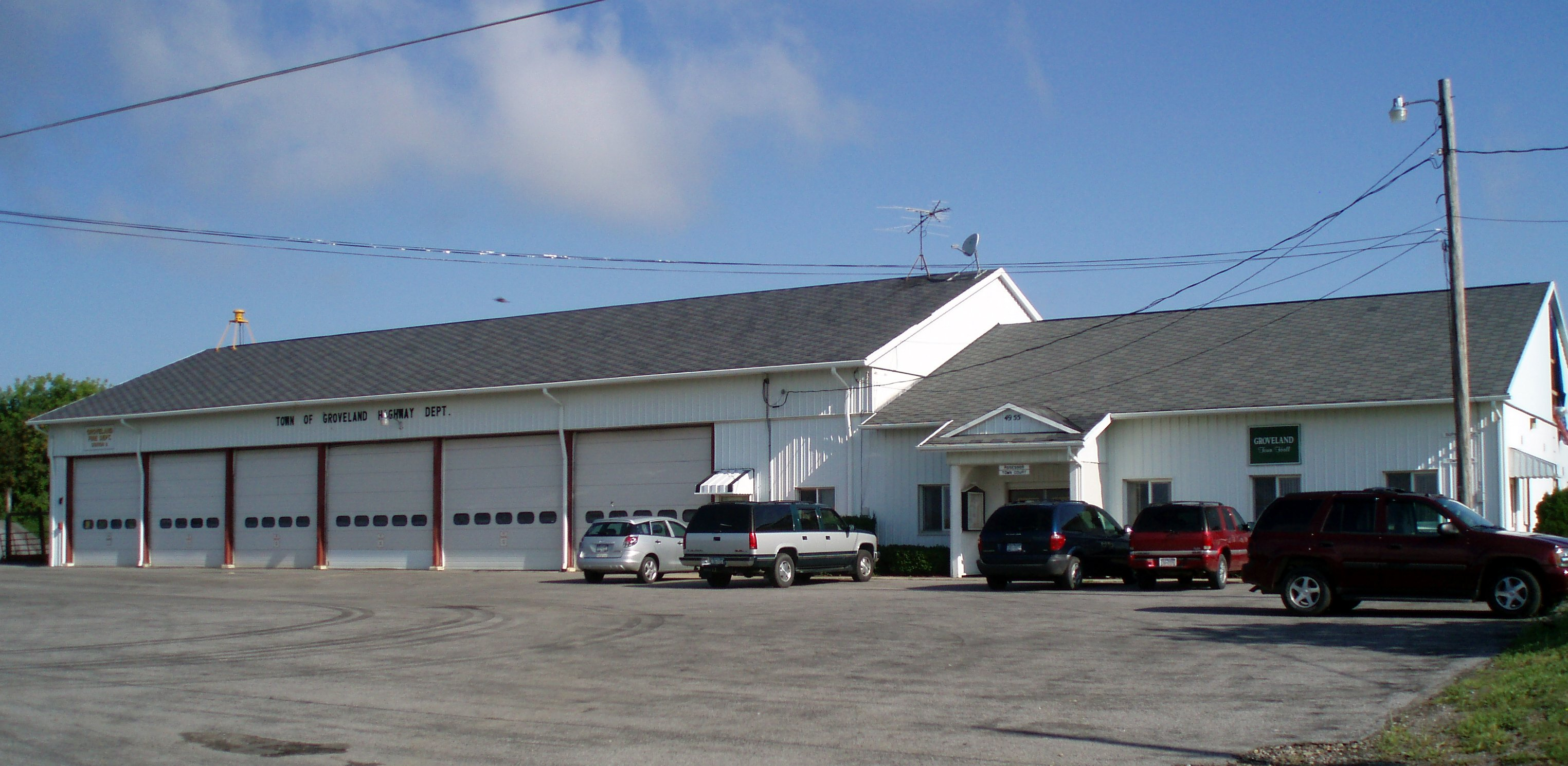
Groveland Town Hall

Interstate 390 passes north-to-south through the town. New York State Route 36, New York State Route 63, and New York State Route 256 are north-south highways through the town. New York State Route 408 is a highway terminating in the western part of the town at NY-63.

Groveland is on the Rochester-to-Dansville line of the Rochester & Southern Railroad. From 1882–1963, Groveland was on the Main Line of the Delaware, Lackawanna and Western Railroad (DL&W) and successor Erie Lackawanna Railroad. In 1963, the Main Line over Dansville Hill from Groveland to Wayland was abandoned by order of the Interstate Commerce Commission upon application by the Erie Lackawanna Railroad, which had secured much lesser grades on the former Erie Railroad via Hornell. The portion of today's R&S line west and north of Groveland was originally part of the DL&W, while the portion between Groveland and Dansville was part of the Dansville and Mount Morris Railroad and predecessors.

=== Adjacent towns and areas ===
(Clockwise)

- Geneseo
- Conesus
- Sparta; West Sparta
- Mount Morris

== Demographics ==
Historical population
Census	Pop.	Note	%±
1820	1,273		—
1830	1,703		33.8%
1840	2,000		17.4%
1850	1,724		−13.8%
1860	1,565		−9.2%
1870	1,455		−7.0%
1880	1,342		−7.8%
1890	1,307		−2.6%
1900	1,949		49.1%
1910	2,820		44.7%
1920	2,920		3.5%
1930	3,295		12.8%
1940	4,135		25.5%
1950	3,381		−18.2%
1960	3,373		−0.2%
1970	3,004		−10.9%
1980	2,140		−28.8%
1990	3,190		49.1%
2000	3,853		20.8%
2010	3,249		−15.7%
2020	2,409		−25.9%
U.S. Decennial Census

As of the census of 2000, there were 3,853 people, 555 households, and 396 families residing in the town. The population density was 98.4 inhabitants per square mile (38.0/km^{2}). There were 649 housing units at an average density of 16.6 per square mile (6.4/km^{2}). The racial makeup of the town was 60.06% White, 32.44% African American, 0.26% Native American, 0.18% Asian, 6.46% from other races, and 0.60% from two or more races. Hispanic or Latino of any race were 15.23% of the population.

There were 555 households, out of which 33.0% had children under the age of 18 living with them, 59.8% were married couples living together, 6.7% had a female householder, and 28.6% were non-families. 20.9% of all households were made up of individuals, and 7.0% had someone living alone who was 65 years of age or older. The average household size was 2.63 and the average family size was 3.04.

In the town, the population was spread out, with 9.9% under the age of 18, 10.4% from 18 to 24, 54.2% from 25 to 44, 20.4% from 45 to 64, and 5.1% who were 65 years of age or older. The median age was 36 years. For every 100 females, there were 411.0 males. For every 100 females age 18 and over, there were 529.9 males.

The median income for a household in the town was $46,797, and the median income for a family was $48,828. Males had a median income of $24,353 versus $26,477 for females. The per capita income for the town was $13,433. About 7.7% of families and 8.8% of the population were below the poverty line, including 12.8% of those under age 18 and 1.2% of those age 65 or over.

== Communities and locations in the Town of Groveland ==
- Cottonwood Point – A hamlet on the shore of Conesus Lake and on NY-256.
- East Groveland – A hamlet in the northeast part of the town.
- Gray Corners – A location south of Maple Beach.
- Groveland – The hamlet of Groveland is by the south town line on NY-63 and is part of the "Groveland Station" census-designated place. The Sparta First Presbyterian Church was added to the National Register of Historic Places in 2007.
- Groveland Corners – A hamlet in the central part of the town, north of Groveland village.
- Groveland Correctional Facility – A state prison by the west town line, near Sonyea.
- Hampton Corners – A location in the northwest part of the town on NY-63. The Black and White Farm Barn was added to the National Register of Historic Places in 1988.
- Hunts Corners – A former community in the northeast part of the town.
- Maple Beach – A location on Conesus Lake, south of Cottonwood Point on NY-256.
- Ross Corners – A location by the south town line.
- Scottsburg – A hamlet and census-designated place primarily located in Sparta that extends into the eastern edge of Groveland.
- Sonyea – A hamlet in the southwest part of the town on NY-36. The name could translate to “burning sun” or “hot valley," or comes from “Son-He," a Seneca name meaning Thou Art Living There) or from Seneca Captain Snow (Soyeawa). A persistent rumor began that the name was an acronym for the State Of New York Epileptic Asylum, but the name Sonyea was used in the early 1800s, long before Craig Colony for Epileptics opened in 1896.
- Tuscarora – The First Presbyterian Church of Tuscarora was added to the National Register of Historic Places in 2004.
- Williamsburgh – A former community in the town that was the site of the first planned European American settlement, although it was soon abandoned.

All of the hamlets listed on the shore of Conesus Lake are part of the Conesus Lake census-designated place.
