= Sparta, New York =

- Town
- Location within the state of New York Sparta (the United States)
- Coordinates: 42°37′40″N 077°41′50″W
- Country: United States
- State: New York
- County: Livingston

Government
  - Type: Town Council
  - Town Supervisor: Mark J. Schuster (R)
  - Town Council: Members' List: • Glenn Kreiley (R); • William T. Smith (R); • Debra J. Halpenny (R); • John L. Davis (R)

Area
  - Total: 27.78 sq mi (71.96 km^{2})
  - Land: 27.78 sq mi (71.96 km^{2})
  - Water: 0 sq mi (0.00 km^{2})
- Elevation: 1,320 ft (400 m)

Population (2010)
  - Total: 1,624
  - Estimate (2016): 1,584
  - Density: 57.0/sq mi (22.01/km^{2})
- Time zone: Eastern (EST)
- ZIP Codes: 14437 (Dansville); 14545 (Scottsburg); 14572 (Wayland); 14435 (Conesus); 14462 (Groveland)
- FIPS code: 36-051-70101
- Website: www.sparta-ny.gov

Sparta is a town in Livingston County, New York, United States. The population was 1,624 at the 2010 census. Sparta is in the southeast part of the county and is north of Dansville.

== History ==
The area was first settled circa 1794. Sparta was established in 1789 before the establishment of Livingston County. Eventually, Sparta was diminished by the removal of land for other towns, including Springwater (1816), West Sparta (1846), and Groveland (1856). Sparta also received territory from other towns: Dansville (in Steuben County) (1822) and Groveland (1856).

== Notable people ==
- Daniel Shays, leader of Shays' Rebellion, lived his later life here

== Geography ==
According to the United States Census Bureau, the town has a total of 27.7 square miles (72 km^{2}), all land.

A small part of the south town line is the border of Steuben County.

New York State Route 255 (now decommissioned) joined New York State Route 256 in Sparta. New York State Route 63 is a north-south highway in the western part of the town.

Conesus Inlet, flowing toward Conesus Lake, is in the northwest part of the town.

=== Adjacent towns and areas ===
(Clockwise)

- Groveland; Conesus
- Springwater
- Wayland; North Dansville
- West Sparta

== Demographics ==
Historical population
Census	Pop.	Note	%±
1820	1,475		—
1830	3,777		156.1%
1840	5,841		54.6%
1850	1,372		−76.5%
1860	1,248		−9.0%
1870	1,182		−5.3%
1880	1,201		1.6%
1890	1,136		−5.4%
1900	1,189		4.7%
1910	985		−17.2%
1920	833		−15.4%
1930	974		16.9%
1940	887		−8.9%
1950	971		9.5%
1960	1,019		4.9%
1970	1,157		13.5%
1980	1,458		26.0%
1990	1,578		8.2%
2000	1,627		3.1%
2010	1,624		−0.2%
2016 (est.)	1,584		−2.5%
U.S. Decennial Census

As of the census of 2000, there were 1,627 people, 595 households, and 462 families residing in the town. The population density was 58.6 inhabitants per square mile (22.6/km^{2}). There were 627 housing units at an average density of 22.6 per square mile (8.7/km^{2}). The racial makeup of the town was 96.62% White, 0.68% African American, 0.43% Native American, 0.86% Asian, 0.25% from other races, and 1.17% from two or more races. Hispanic or Latino of any race were 0.43% of the population.

There were 595 households, out of which 30.9% had children under the age of 18 living with them, 66.7% were married couples living together, 6.7% had a female householder with no husband present, and 22.2% were non-families. 15.8% of all households were made up of individuals, and 6.4% had someone living alone who was 65 years of age or older. The average household size was 2.73 and the average family size was 3.03.

In the town, the population was spread out, with 25.1% under the age of 18, 5.0% from 18 to 24, 29.2% from 25 to 44, 28.1% from 45 to 64, and 12.5% who were 65 years of age or older. The median age was 40 years. For every 100 females, there were 107.3 males. For every 100 females age 18 and over, there were 101.7 males.

The median income for a household in the town was $43,155, and the median income for a family was $48,333. Males had a median income of $35,938 versus $23,693 for females. The per capita income for the town was $17,947. About 8.0% of families and 10.2% of the population were below the poverty line, including 15.5% of those under age 18 and 3.6% of those age 65 or over.

== Communities and locations in the Town of Sparta ==
- Groveland Station – A hamlet and census-designated place partially located in the northwest corner of the town.
- Reed Corners – A hamlet in the south part of the town.
- Scottsburg – A hamlet and census-designated place in the northwest part of the town on NY-256. It was formerly named "Scottsburgh" after a family of early settlers, Matthew and William Scott. This community is near the first settlement in the town.
- Sparta Center – A location in the center of the town.
- White Bridge – A location in the southwest part of the town on NY-63, near Dansville.
