= Craig Colony for Epileptics =

Former residential facility for epileptics in New York

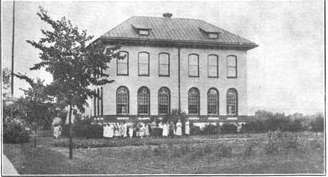
Craig Colony

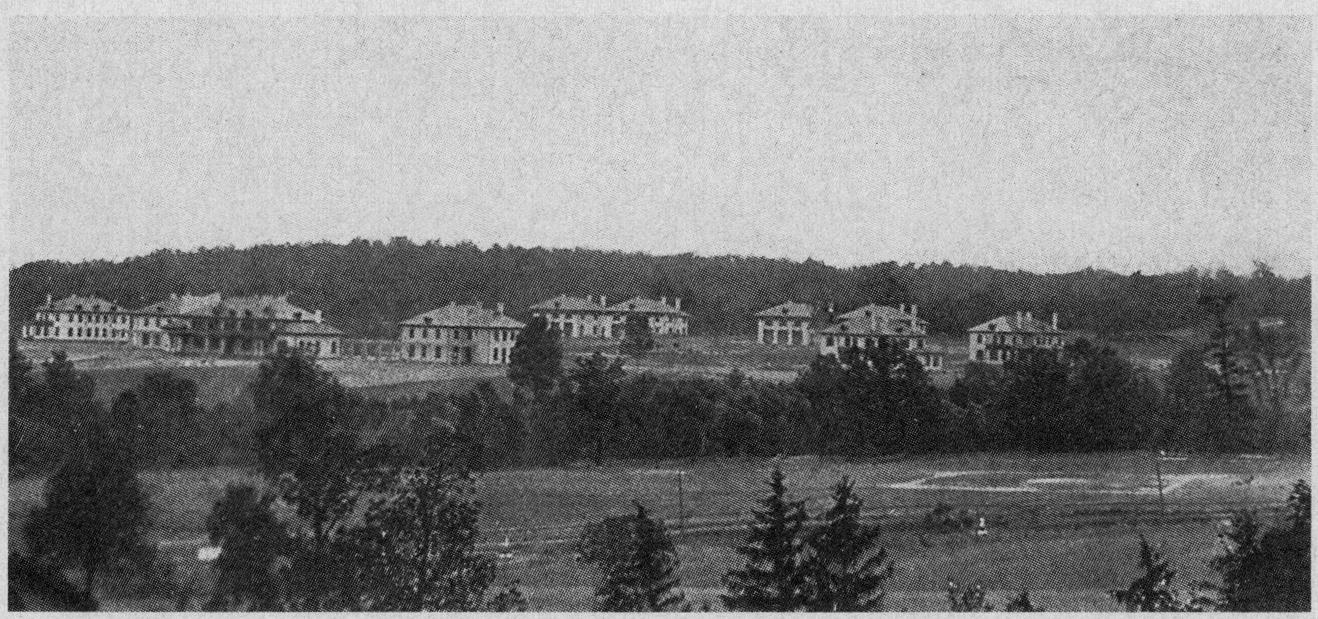
Panorama

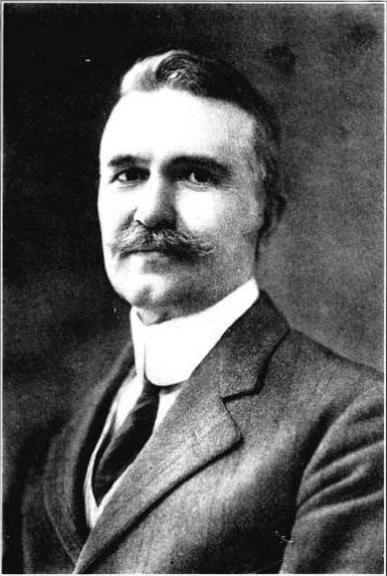
Superintendent, Dr. William P. Spratling

Craig Colony for Epileptics was a residential facility for epileptics in Sonyea, Livingston County, New York, US.

== History ==
Situated at a former Shaker colony, the facility was established in 1896 on 1,900 acres (770 ha). Its inspiration was the colony at Bielefeld, Westphalia, Germany. Craig Colony was situated 70 miles (110 km) southeast of Buffalo and 40 miles (64 km) south of Rochester. The facility was maintained by New York State appropriations. To be admitted to the Colony, the patient had to be a legal resident of New York State, and been declared epileptic by a physician. The Colony School, under the auspices of the Geneseo State Normal School, convened in 1921. The Peterson Hospital was on the premises, as were a farm, garden, and dairy. Before the facility opened, it was known as Sonyea Colony but the name was changed to Craig Colony after Oscar Craig who was serving as president of the State Board of Charities. Its name continued to change over the years: Craig Colony for Epileptics (1896), Craig Colony (1920), Craig Colony and Hospital (1951), Craig Colony School and Hospital (1966), Craig State School (1968), and Craig Developmental Center (1969). Even though there were approximately 2,000 patients at the colony in 1967, it closed its doors the following year. George Metzger of Buffalo was the architect in 1896.

== See also ==
- Asylum architecture

== Bibliography ==
- Managers and Officers of the Craig Colony (1922). Annual Report (Public domain ed.). Craig Colony Press. p. 48.
- New York (State). Dept. of Social Services (1919). Annual Report, Social Services in New York State (Public domain ed.).
- Palmer, George P.; Graham, Robert E. (1897). Michigan Law Journal. Vol. 6 (Public domain ed.). University of Michigan Libraries. UOM:39015069760976.
- Szasz, Thomas Stephen (1998). Cruel Compassion: Psychiatric Control of Society's Unwanted. Syracuse University Press. ISBN 978-0-8156-0510-2.
- Taylor, C. F. (1897). The Medical World (Public domain ed.). Roy Jackson.
