= First Presbyterian Church of Tuscarora =

Historic church in New York, United States

- U.S. National Register of Historic Places
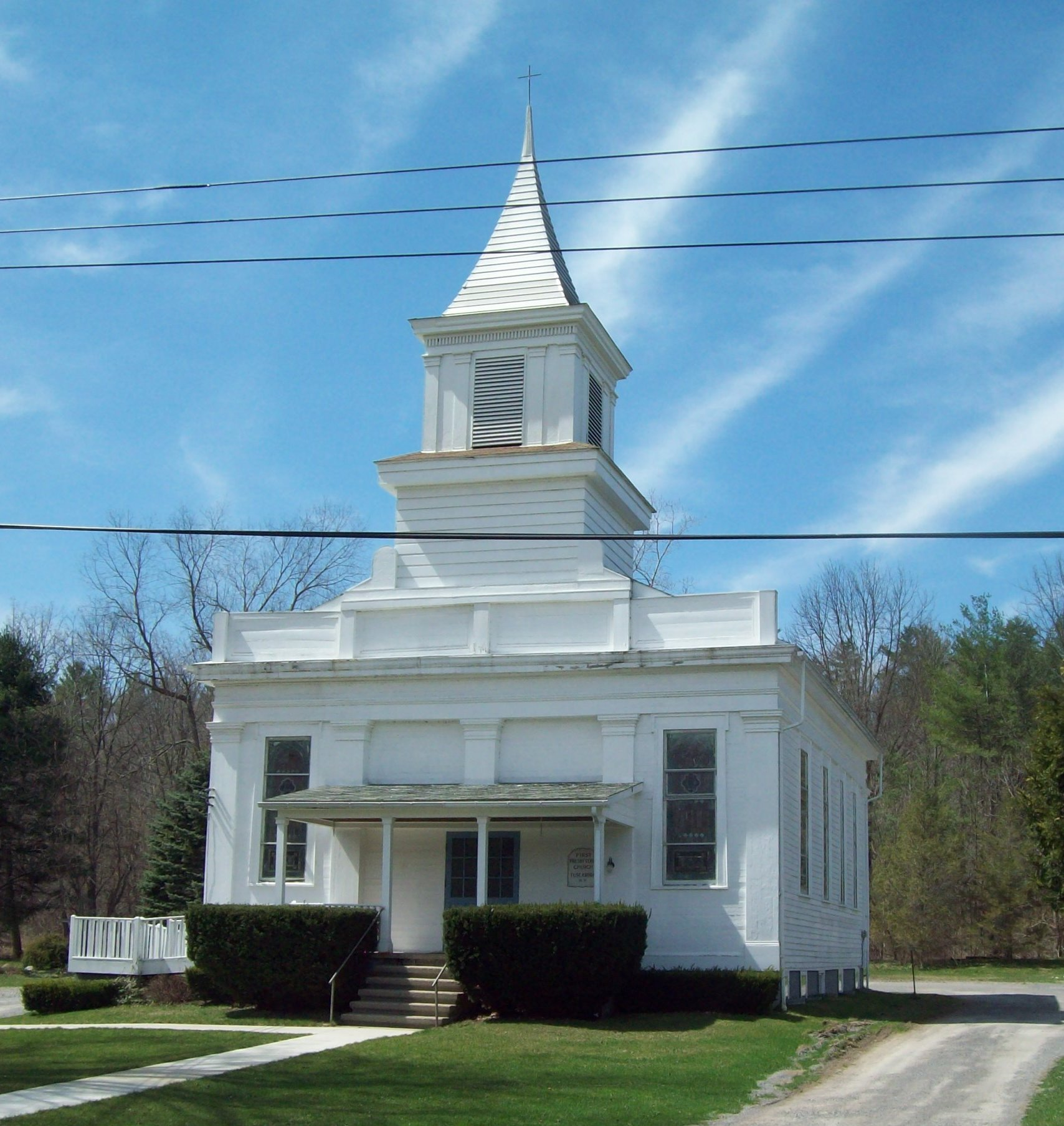
- First Presbyterian Church of Tuscarora, April 2011

- Location within New York Location within the United States
- Location: 8082 Main St., Tuscarora, New York
- Coordinates: 42°38′3″N 77°52′12″W
- Area: less than one acre
- Architectural style: Greek Revival
- NRHP reference No.: 03001400
- Added to NRHP: January 14, 2004

First Presbyterian Church of Tuscarora is a historic Presbyterian church located at Tuscarora in Livingston County, New York. It was built about 1844 and is a three- by five-bay Greek Revival style frame building. The gable roof is surmounted by a short, two stage tower topped by a pyramidal roof with a slight concave curve with a cross at its apex. The interior features an elaborate Eastlake style three tier oil chandelier suspended in the center of the sanctuary over the main aisle. It is last surviving public building from the hamlet's brief early to mid-19th century commercial prosperity related to its location on the Genesee Valley Canal.

It was listed on the National Register of Historic Places in 2004.
