= Oscar Craig =

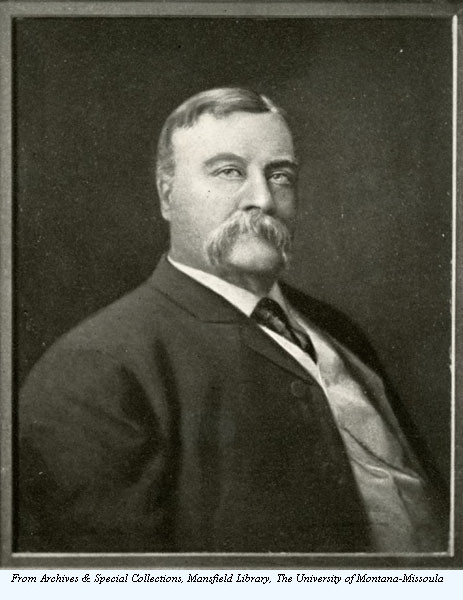
Oscar J. Craig, first president of the University of Montana.

Oscar J. Craig (1846–1911) was the first president of the University of Montana. Craig served as the president between July 1895 to October 1908, and he managed the university almost single-handedly for those thirteen years. Craig taught a few classes each semester, as well as helping to establish the campus itself. He also founded a significant amount of the programs at the university that still persist today. Prior to graduating from DePauw University in 1884, Craig served in the position of Superintendent of City Schools in Sullivan, Indiana for a few years. In 1883, he became a professor at Purdue University, teaching political economy and history before moving to Montana to found the university. Following his presidency, Craig retired from education in 1908 due to ill health.

== Early life and education ==
Craig was born in 1846 in Jefferson County, Indiana. He served in the 1st Regiment of the Indiana Heavy Artillery during the American Civil War as a private to Captain George W. Branson from August 13, 1864, to July 22, 1865. Craig was discharged from service at age 18 on July 22, 1865, a few months after the end of the Civil War. He was positioned in New Orleans, Louisiana when he received his discharge letter. Craig married Narcissa G. Craig (1848–1937) after serving in the war, and Narcissa would go on to inherit Craig's estate when he died in 1911.

Craig earned his undergraduate Bachelor of Arts degree in 1881 from Asbury University and later went on to earn his postgraduate master's degree in 1884 from DePauw University. Finally, he achieved his Ph.D. in History and Political Science from the University of Wooster in Ohio in 1887. Craig taught political science and history courses at Purdue University for roughly a decade before going to Montana in 1895.

== Founding of the University ==
Prior to the arrival of Oscar Craig, the University of Montana consisted of a single building that was built in 1881 and it remained that way until 1895. The number of faculty that were working in the university before 1895 was five people, but during Craig's time as president, that number grew to 27. Craig created a wide variety of programs, and many of them still persist today. He created the Schools of Engineering and Pharmacy, the departments of History, Education, English, Literature, Vocal Expression, Chemistry, Mathematics, Latin and Greek, Modern Languages, Physics and Geology, Biology, Music, and Drawing.

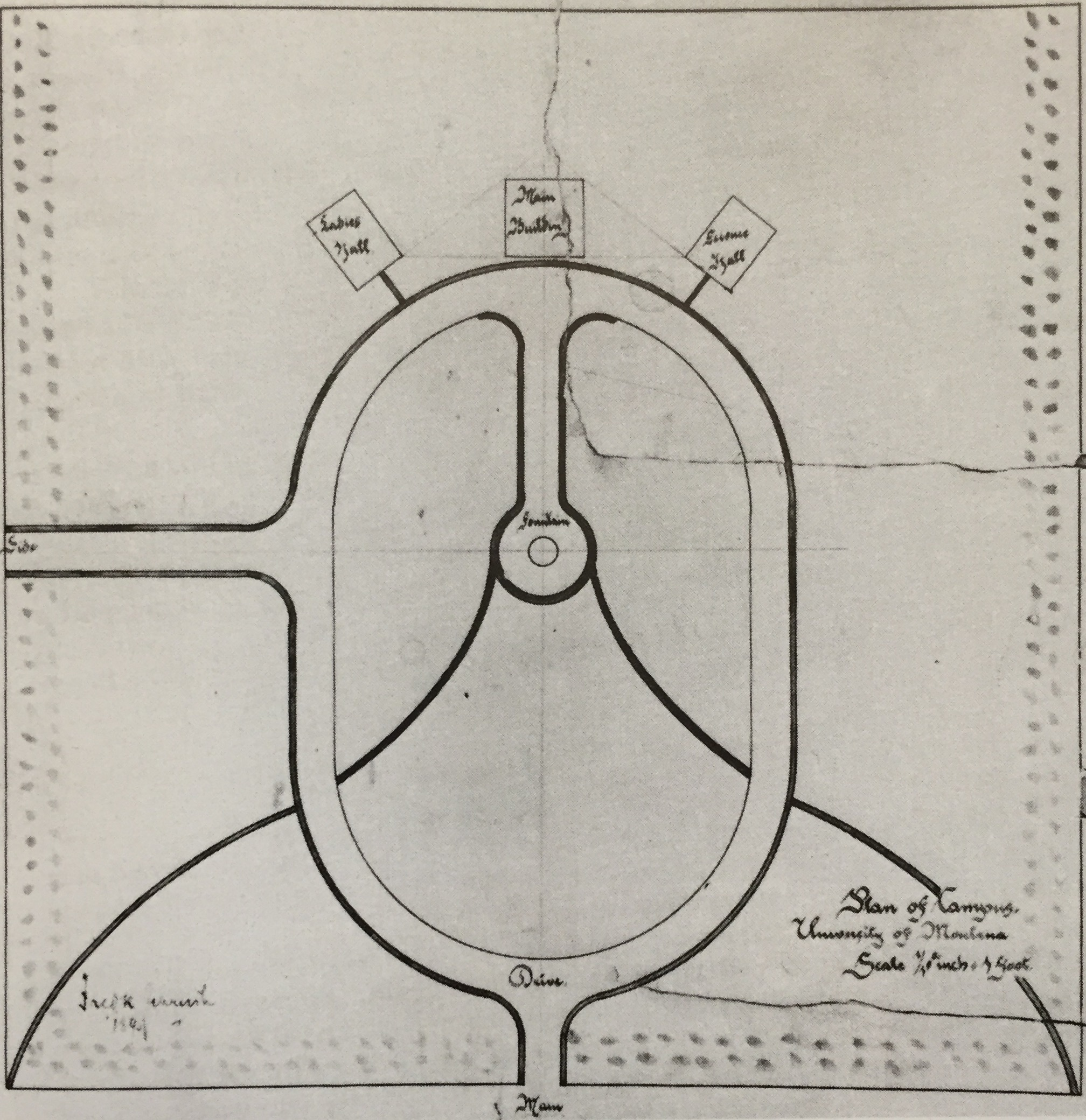
This is Frederick Scheuch and Oscar Craig's original plan for the Oval, a focal point of the university campus today.

Craig did a majority of the work in the early years of managing the university, not only through hiring more faculty but also by teaching courses in history, philosophy, literature, political science, and psychology. Not only did he create many new academic programs for the university, but he also created multiple extracurricular programs. He helped found The Kaimin student newspaper, the Associated Students at The University of Montana, the Shakespeare Club, the Associated Mechanical Engineers, the Silver Cornet Band, two glee clubs, and several Greek organizations, particularly the Sigma Chi fraternity.

He also had a large influence on the multiple buildings that were constructed during his presidency. The most well-known structure on campus that Craig helped construct was The Oval. Craig and a Professor Frederick Scheuch created a map of their intended design for The Oval in 1895, hoping that all of the future buildings on campus would face their entrances towards The Oval. In 1896, the staff of the university helped plant a double row of trees around The Oval in honor of Arbor Day. The Venture Center, the science building of the university, was erected in 1898 along with the University Hall, the main hall. In 1902, the Women's Hall was built and the gymnasium soon followed in 1903. Finally, the University Library was built in 1908 in the Jeannette Rankin Hall, named in honor of Jeannette Rankin, a prominent suffragist who graduated from the University of Montana in 1902.

Craig had a large influence in the growth of the university, with the income increasing from $13,551.71 in 1895 to $59,658.10 in 1907. The enrollment of students tripled over these years, and the income grew more than four times. Craig was also able to raise the salary of the professors of the university from $1200 to $2100 at its highest. In the later years of his presidency, Craig hired some of his first faculty, the most notable being J. M. Hamilton, the superintendent of Missoula schools. This allowed Craig to relax from his numerous duties of running most of the school. Not only did Craig work with the university, but he also became the chairman of committees intended to prepare curricula for grade and high schools. By his retirement in 1908, Craig had assisted 26 public secondary school to prepare their students for college.

== Legacy ==
Almost all of the academic programs that Craig started have remained to the present, and many of the extracurricular programs such as The Kaimin newspaper are still active today. Craig also had a dormitory named in his honor, and today, Craig Hall is the university's mathematics building. Craig's famous quote in the early years of the school, "The University - it shall prosper," was a driving source of motivation for his successive presidents to maintain the expansion of the university. Most of the buildings that Craig helped found in the early years of the university are also still present, although a few of the original buildings such as the gymnasium were demolished in the 1900s. Perhaps the most lasting landmark that Craig created during his time as president was The Oval, as it is seen as a common symbol of the university today. It is near the center of the university and many building surround it, making it a very popular place for students.
