= National Register of Historic Places listings in Monroe County, New York =

Location of Monroe County in New York

This is a description of the National Register of Historic Places listings in Monroe County, New York. The locations of properties and districts listed on the National Register of Historic Places in Monroe County, New York may be seen on a map by clicking on "Map all coordinates" to the right.

There are 231 properties and districts listed on the National Register in the county, including three National Historic Landmarks. The city of Rochester includes 124 of these properties and districts, including all National Historic Landmarks; the Rochester properties and districts are listed separately, while the remaining properties and districts in Monroe County are listed here. One property, the New York State Barge Canal, a National Historic Landmark District, spans both the city and the remainder of the county.

== Current listings ==
This National Park Service list is complete through NPS recent listings posted May 1, 2026.

=== Outside Rochester ===
	Name on the Register	Image	Date listed	Location	City or town	Description
1	Adams-Ryan House	Adams-Ryan House	September 5, 1985 (#85001957)	425 Washington St. 43°11′46″N 77°51′17″W	Adams Basin	
2	Adsit Cobblestone Farmhouse	Adsit Cobblestone Farmhouse	November 29, 1996 (#96001393)	3871 Clover St. 43°00′51″N 77°35′05″W	Mendon	Federal style cobblestone farmhouse from c.1832. Operated as an inn during the mid-19th century, it was used by farmers delivering grain on the road from Canandaigua to Rochester.
3	Alcoa Care-free Home	Alcoa Care-free Home	June 18, 2010 (#10000358)	1589 Clover St. 43°07′39″N 77°32′49″W	Brighton	
4	Antoinette Louisa Brown Blackwell Childhood Home	Antoinette Louisa Brown Blackwell Childhood Home	November 16, 1989 (#89002003)	1099 Pinnacle Rd. 43°03′05″N 77°36′00″W	Henrietta	
5	Brockport Cemetery	Brockport Cemetery	March 8, 2016 (#16000061)	56-98 High St. 43°12′39″N 77°56′02″W	Brockport	Community's primary burial ground for most of the 19th century
6	Brockport Central Rural High School	Brockport Central Rural High School	November 10, 2011 (#11000805)	40 Allen St. 43°12′26″N 77°56′51″W	Brockport	
7	Brockport West Side Historic District		February 12, 2021 (#100006145)	Portions of Main, Holley, Utica, College, Maxon, Adams, Mercer, Allen, Chappell Sts., Centennial Ave., Brockway Pl., and Monroe Ave. 43°12′43″N 77°56′30″W	Brockport	
8	Horace and Grace Bush House	Horace and Grace Bush House	June 10, 1994 (#94000590)	1932 Five Mile Line Rd. 43°08′33″N 77°28′36″W	Penfield	
9	Chase Cobblestone Farmhouse	Chase Cobblestone Farmhouse	November 7, 1995 (#95001279)	1191 Manitou Rd., Town of Parma; 43°15′21″N 77°45′21″W	Hilton	
10	Chili Mills Conservation Area		March 12, 1975 (#75001198)	1 mi. SW of West Chili off Stuart Rd. along Black Creek; 43°04′56″N 77°49′10″W	West Chili	
11	Clarkson Corners Historic District	Clarkson Corners Historic District	September 2, 1994 (#94001076)	Jct. of Ridge and Lake Rds. and E and W along Ridge and S along Lake; 43°13′57″N 77°55′44″W	Clarkson Corners	
12	Cole Cobblestone Farmhouse	Cole Cobblestone Farmhouse	November 29, 1996 (#96001394)	933 Mile Square Rd. 43°00′52″N 77°29′47″W	Mendon	
13	Austin R. Conant House	Austin R. Conant House	August 23, 2016 (#16000554)	30 West St. 43°06′00″N 77°26′48″W	Fairport	1876 Gothic Revival house was home to a number of important early residents of Fairport as it boomed around the Erie Canal
14	William Covert Cobblestone Farmhouse	William Covert Cobblestone Farmhouse	November 7, 1995 (#95001280)	978 N. Greece Rd. 43°13′48″N 77°43′51″W	Greece	
15	Isaac Cox Cobblestone Farmstead	Isaac Cox Cobblestone Farmstead	March 7, 2003 (#03000092)	5015 River Rd. 42°59′42″N 77°44′43″W	Scottsville	
16	Cox–Budlong House	Cox–Budlong House	February 12, 2015 (#15000007)	4396 River Rd. 43°00′50″N 77°44′48″W	Scottsville	1820 Federal style house by early settler of Wheatland later renovated in Greek Revival and Italianate styles
17	Curtis-Crumb Farm	Curtis-Crumb Farm	January 3, 1997 (#96001509)	307 Curtis Rd. 43°18′24″N 77°46′53″W	Hilton	
18	Daisy Flour Mill, Inc.	Daisy Flour Mill, Inc.	June 26, 1972 (#72000855)	1880 Blossom Rd. 43°08′49″N 77°30′45″W	Penfield	A former flour mill, now a restaurant and party house.
19	Dayton's Corners School	Dayton's Corners School	July 5, 2001 (#01000716)	1363 Creek St. 43°10′56″N 77°30′09″W	Penfield	A one-room schoolhouse, Penfield District #9. Now used for fourth-grade local history studies.
20	Henry DeLand House	Henry DeLand House	April 17, 1980 (#80004610)	99 S. Main St. 43°05′55″N 77°26′31″W	Fairport	Home of Henry Addison DeLand, it later became an inn, restaurant, speakeasy, bar and a catering hall.
21	Minerva and Daniel DeLand House	Minerva and Daniel DeLand House	January 30, 2020 (#100004913)	185 N. Main St. 43°06′29″N 77°26′32″W	Fairport	1852 farmhouse renovated in Italian villa style 15 years later for founders of local chemical company; also includes nearby barn
22	Fairport Public Library	Fairport Public Library	December 8, 2017 (#100001886)	18 Perrin St. 43°06′01″N 77°26′38″W	Fairport	
23	First Baptist Church	First Baptist Church	October 20, 2011 (#11000752)	124 Main St. 43°12′50″N 77°56′22″W	Brockport	
24	First Baptist Church of Fairport	First Baptist Church of Fairport	September 28, 2006 (#06000892)	94 S. Main St. 43°06′02″N 77°26′32″W	Fairport	A church undergoing restoration
25	First Baptist Church of Mumford	First Baptist Church of Mumford	March 23, 2010 (#10000100)	5 Dakin St. 42°59′25″N 77°51′35″W	Mumford	
26	First Congregational Church of Fairport	First Congregational Church of Fairport	August 28, 2018 (#100002835)	26 E Church St. 43°05′55″N 77°26′25″W	Fairport	Well-preserved 1868 Romanesque Revival church by John Rochester Thomas
27	First Presbyterian Church	First Presbyterian Church	June 25, 1999 (#99000752)	35 State St. 43°12′52″N 77°56′14″W	Brockport	
28	First Presbyterian Church of Mumford	First Presbyterian Church of Mumford	April 1, 2002 (#02000299)	George and William Sts. 42°59′32″N 77°51′42″W	Mumford	
29	Garbuttsville Cemetery	Garbuttsville Cemetery	November 29, 2006 (#06001077)	Union St. 43°00′54″N 77°47′29″W	Garbutt	
30	Gates-Livermore Cobblestone Farmhouse	Gates-Livermore Cobblestone Farmhouse	November 29, 1996 (#96001390)	4389 Clover St. 42°59′29″N 77°34′51″W	Mendon	
31	Grace Church	Grace Church	July 30, 2010 (#10000514)	9 Browns Ave. 43°01′22″N 77°45′05″W	Scottsville	
32	Greece Memorial Hall	Greece Memorial Hall	April 23, 1998 (#98000395)	2595 Ridge Rd. W 43°12′34″N 77°41′43″W	Greece	
33	Edward Harrison House	Edward Harrison House	October 22, 2010 (#10000854)	75 College St. 43°12′42″N 77°56′42″W	Brockport	
34	Hildreth-Lord-Hawley Farm	Hildreth-Lord-Hawley Farm	October 29, 1996 (#96001169)	44 N. Main St. 43°05′37″N 77°30′48″W	Pittsford	
35	Franklin Hinchey House	Franklin Hinchey House	November 10, 1983 (#83004045)	634 Hinchey Rd. 43°08′12″N 77°41′27″W	Gates	
36	Hipp-Kennedy House	Hipp-Kennedy House	February 4, 1994 (#94000003)	1931 Five Mile Line Rd. 43°08′34″N 77°28′35″W	Penfield	
37	Honeoye Falls Village Historic District	Honeoye Falls Village Historic District	November 24, 1993 (#93001225)	Roughly, jct. of Main, Monroe and Ontario Sts. and adjacent areas 42°56′54″N 77°35′32″W	Honeoye Falls	
38	Hopkins Farm	Hopkins Farm	October 6, 2000 (#00001153)	3151 Clover St. 43°03′40″N 77°33′28″W	Pittsford	
39	House at 288 Wimbledon Road	House at 288 Wimbledon Road	November 24, 2015 (#15000822)	288 Wimbledon Rd. 43°12′18″N 77°36′36″W	Irondequoit	Demonstration house built in 1928 by Fred P. Tosch Inc. and co-sponsored by the Democrat & Chronicle and Home Owners Service Institute to promote high quality design and cutting edge construction for middle income families.
40	Thomas L. Hulburt House	Thomas L. Hulburt House	February 16, 2016 (#16000019)	106 Hulburt Rd; 43°05′36″N 77°27′11″W	Fairport	1853 Greek Revival house of lawyer and developer instrumental to Fairport's growth
41	Jayne and Mason Bank Building	Jayne and Mason Bank Building	November 1, 2006 (#06000970)	11 E. Main St. 43°12′50″N 77°25′47″W	Webster	Currently a secondhand shop called "Nest Things"
42	William C. Jayne House	William C. Jayne House	September 28, 2006 (#06000891)	183 E. Main St. 43°12′53″N 77°25′23″W	Webster	
43	James H. and Sarah Johnson House	James H. and Sarah Johnson House	February 2, 2022 (#100007386)	86 Mountain Rd. 43°08′25″N 77°29′22″W	Penfield vicinity	
44	Koda-Vista Historic District	Koda-Vista Historic District	August 16, 2019 (#100004270)	Hoover & Vista Drs., Merrick, Allerton, Hammond, Maiden, Acton, Ayer & Elmguard Sts., portion of West Ridge Rd. 43°12′10″N 77°40′05″W	Greece	
45	Lake View Cemetery	Lake View Cemetery	July 24, 2009 (#09000559)	NY 19; 43°12′38″N 77°56′02″W	Brockport	
46	Adolph Lomb House	Adolph Lomb House	January 24, 1995 (#94001597)	Jct. of Sutherland St. and W. Jefferson Rd. 43°05′20″N 77°31′26″W	Pittsford	
47	Lower Mill	Lower Mill	May 17, 1973 (#73001200)	N. Main St. 42°57′22″N 77°35′20″W	Honeoye Falls	
48	Main Street Historic District	Main Street Historic District	April 2, 2004 (#04000227)	Main, Market and King Sts. 43°13′00″N 77°56′18″W	Brockport	
49	Donald Mann House	Donald Mann House	June 25, 2013 (#13000449)	327 Stewart Rd. 43°00′02″N 77°48′24″W	Scottsville	
50	George G. Mason House	George G. Mason House	October 27, 2004 (#04001206)	39 Dunning Ave. 43°12′49″N 77°25′34″W	Webster	
51	David McVean House	David McVean House	January 18, 2006 (#05001531)	805 North Rd. 43°01′41″N 77°45′38″W	Scottsville	
52	Mendon Cobblestone Academy	Mendon Cobblestone Academy	November 29, 1996 (#96001395)	16 Mendon-Ionia Rd. 42°59′48″N 77°30′18″W	Mendon	
53	Mendon Presbyterian Church	Mendon Presbyterian Church	December 23, 2005 (#05001455)	3886 Rush-Mendon Rd. 43°00′00″N 77°30′25″W	Mendon	
54	Romanta T. Miller House	Romanta T. Miller House	April 11, 2014 (#14000144)	1089 Bowerman Rd. 42°59′25″N 77°46′11″W	Wheatland	
55	Miller–Horton–Barben Farm	Miller–Horton–Barben Farm	January 14, 2015 (#14001161)	983 W. Bloomfield Rd. 42°59′34″N 77°31′42″W	Mendon	Established in 1808, this 90-acre (36 ha) farm is one of the oldest in town
56	Morgan-Manning House	Morgan-Manning House	April 25, 1991 (#91000443)	151 Main St. 43°12′45″N 77°56′22″W	Brockport	
57	Mud House	Mud House	October 11, 1978 (#78001862)	1000 Whalen Rd. 43°08′31″N 77°27′36″W	Penfield	
58	New York State Barge Canal	New York State Barge Canal	October 15, 2014 (#14000860)	Linear across county 43°05′30″N 77°32′48″W	Brighton, Brockport, Chili, Clarkson, Fairport, Gates, Greece, Henrietta, Ogden, Perinton, Pittsford, Spencerport, Sweden	Successor to Erie Canal approved by state voters in early 20th century to compete with railroads.
59	North Star School District No. 11	North Star School District No. 11	September 10, 2014 (#14000579)	660 Walker Lake Ontario Rd. 43°19′08″N 77°51′36″W	Hamlin	Late 19th-century one-room schoolhouse now serves as local history museum
60	Oak Hill Country Club	Oak Hill Country Club	April 24, 2023 (#100008862)	145 Kilbourn Rd. 43°06′47″N 77°31′59″W	Pittsford vicinity	
61	Oatka Cemetery	Oatka Cemetery	February 24, 2014 (#14000025)	411 Scottsville-Mumford Rd. 43°00′51″N 77°46′32″W	Wheatland	
62	Our Mother of Sorrows Roman Catholic Church Complex	Our Mother of Sorrows Roman Catholic Church Complex	November 30, 1989 (#89002001)	1785 Latta Rd. 43°15′10″N 77°39′33″W	Greece	
63	Park Avenue and State Street Historic District	Park Avenue and State Street Historic District	August 24, 2015 (#15000538)	15–121 Park Ave., 15-118 State, 36–54 South, 6 & 12 High & 14 & 20 Spring Sts. 43°12′47″N 77°56′16″W	Brockport	Residential core of village with intact houses in various 19th-century styles
64	William Payne House	William Payne House	June 20, 2012 (#12000343)	505 Elmgrove Rd. 43°10′46″N 77°44′00″W	Greece	
65	Penfield Road Historic District	Penfield Road Historic District	December 7, 2005 (#05001381)	1862-1895 Penfield Rd. 43°07′49″N 77°28′04″W	Penfield	
66	Stephen Phelps House	Stephen Phelps House	February 2, 1995 (#94001635)	2701 Penfield Rd. 43°07′39″N 77°23′32″W	Penfield	
67	Phoenix Building	Phoenix Building	August 7, 1974 (#74001257)	S. Main and State Sts. 43°05′26″N 77°30′56″W	Pittsford	
68	Pines of Perinton Apartments	Pines of Perinton Apartments	January 24, 2023 (#100008606)	1 White Pine Cir. 43°06′34″N 77°26′50″W	Perinton vicinity	
69	Pittsford Village Historic District	Pittsford Village Historic District	September 7, 1984; April 12, 2016 (#84002736)16000163	High, Church, Grove, Line, Locust, Maple, N. & S. Main, State, Sutherland, Wood, Boughton, E. Jefferson, Golf, Rand, 43°05′21″N 77°31′05″W	Pittsford	Collection of sophisticated houses reflecting styles from 1810s to 1930s
70	Potter Historic District	Potter Historic District	August 18, 2017 (#100001485)	1-60 Potter Place, 53, 73 & 69 W. Church St. 43°05′48″N 77°26′50″W	Fairport	
71	Samuel Rich House	Samuel Rich House	December 30, 1987 (#87002199)	2204 Five Mile Line Rd. 43°07′26″N 77°28′34″W	Penfield	
72	Richardson's Tavern	Richardson's Tavern	May 6, 1980 (#80002652)	1474 Marsh Rd. 43°03′43″N 77°28′38″W	Perinton	
73	Riga Academy	Riga Academy	November 21, 1980 (#80002653)	3 Riga-Mumford Rd. 43°04′09″N 77°52′47″W	Riga	
74	Rochester Street Historic District	Rochester Street Historic District	October 25, 1973 (#73001205)	Both sides of Rochester St. 43°01′25″N 77°44′49″W	Scottsville	
75	Simeon Sage House	Simeon Sage House	January 29, 2010 (#09001285)	69 Main St. 43°01′09″N 77°45′24″W	Scottsville	
76	Sheldon Cobblestone House	Sheldon Cobblestone House	November 29, 1996 (#96001392)	21 Mendon-Ionia Rd., S of jct. with NY 251; 42°59′49″N 77°30′16″W	Mendon	
77	William Shirts House	William Shirts House	April 16, 2004 (#04000286)	196 Harmon Rd. 43°01′30″N 77°51′16″W	Scottsville	
78	Andrew Short House	Andrew Short House	February 14, 2014 (#14000005)	1294 Lehigh Station Rd. 43°03′34″N 77°37′54″W	Henrietta	
79	Hiram Sibley Homestead		September 12, 1985 (#85002291)	29 Sibley Rd. 42°58′06″N 77°36′56″W	Sibleyville	
80	Soldiers' Memorial Tower	Soldiers' Memorial Tower	April 8, 1994 (#94000332)	Owens Rd. N of Conrail RR tracks 43°12′28″N 77°55′07″W	Brockport	
81	Spencerport Methodist Church	Spencerport Methodist Church	April 11, 2008 (#08000274)	32 Amity St. 43°11′34″N 77°48′08″W	Spencerport	
82	Martin & Andrew Sperbeck House	Martin & Andrew Sperbeck House	November 4, 2022 (#100008336)	200 South Main St. 43°05′37″N 77°26′32″W	Fairport	
83	Spring House	Spring House	November 20, 1975 (#75001199)	3001 Monroe Ave. 43°06′33″N 77°32′47″W	Pittsford	An inn along the original Erie Canal, now a restaurant
84	St. John's Episcopal Church	St. John's Episcopal Church	July 7, 1988 (#88001014)	11 Episcopal Ave. 42°57′12″N 77°35′35″W	Honeoye Falls	
85	St. Luke's Episcopal Church	St. Luke's Episcopal Church	April 26, 1990 (#90000686)	14 State St. 43°12′51″N 77°56′18″W	Brockport	
86	Stewart Cobblestone Farmhouse	Stewart Cobblestone Farmhouse	March 4, 1997 (#96001391)	Douglas Rd., S of jct. with Canfield Rd. 43°01′57″N 77°33′23″W	Mendon	
87	Stone-Tolan House	Stone-Tolan House	July 21, 1983 (#83001710)	2370 East Ave. 43°08′23″N 77°32′32″W	Brighton	
88	Tall Maples Miniature Golf Course	Tall Maples Miniature Golf Course	December 31, 2002 (#02001653)	4083 Culver Rd. 43°13′42″N 77°32′50″W	Sea Breeze	Now known as Parkside Whispering Pines
89	Tinker Cobblestone Farmstead	Tinker Cobblestone Farmstead	April 27, 1995 (#95000502)	1585 Calkins Rd. 43°04′08″N 77°34′30″W	Henrietta	
90	Totiakton Site	Totiakton Site	September 21, 1978 (#78001861)	Address Restricted	Honeoye Falls	
91	Union Presbyterian Church	Union Presbyterian Church	December 13, 2004 (#04001439)	Church St. 43°01′18″N 77°45′07″W	Scottsville	
92	United Congregational Church of Irondequoit	United Congregational Church of Irondequoit	August 2, 2002 (#02000822)	644 Titus Ave. 43°12′39″N 77°35′59″W	Irondequoit	
93	US Post Office-East Rochester	US Post Office-East Rochester	November 17, 1988 (#88002495)	206 W. Commercial St. 43°06′49″N 77°29′19″W	East Rochester	Named the Officer Daryl R. Pierson Memorial Post Office Building in 2015.
94	US Post Office-Honeoye Falls	US Post Office-Honeoye Falls	May 11, 1989 (#88002505)	39 W. Main St. 42°57′08″N 77°35′33″W	Honeoye Falls	
95	Walker-Warren House	Walker-Warren House	April 22, 2021 (#100006485)	5628 West Henrietta Rd. 43°02′29″N 77°39′41″W	West Henrietta	
96	Webster Baptist Church	Webster Baptist Church	November 7, 1991 (#91001672)	59 South Ave. 43°12′38″N 77°25′52″W	Webster	
97	Webster Grange No. 436	Webster Grange No. 436	August 22, 2016 (#16000555)	58 E. Main St., 43°12′46″N 77°25′42″W	Webster	1900 meeting place for what was at one time largest Grange chapter in the country; now shared with local singing group.
98	Harvey Whalen House	Harvey Whalen House	November 21, 1994 (#94001342)	140 Whalen Rd. 43°08′29″N 77°26′45″W	Penfield	
99	Wheatland Baptist Cemetery	Wheatland Baptist Cemetery	January 18, 2006 (#05001536)	McGinnis, Belcoda and Harmon Rds. 43°01′33″N 77°50′49″W	Belcoda	
100	Whitcomb Cobblestone Farmhouse	Whitcomb Cobblestone Farmhouse	November 29, 1996 (#96001396)	437 Pond Rd. 43°00′24″N 77°31′58″W	Mendon	
101	John and Chauncey White House	John and Chauncey White House	January 15, 2014 (#13001091)	854 White Rd. 43°10′38″N 77°59′13″W	West Sweden	
102	Whiteside, Barnett and Co. Agricultural Works	Whiteside, Barnett and Co. Agricultural Works	February 22, 2001 (#00001157)	60 Clinton St. 43°12′59″N 77°56′29″W	Brockport	
103	Wilbur House	Wilbur House	May 6, 1980 (#80002651)	187 S. Main St. 43°05′40″N 77°26′30″W	Fairport	
104	Wilkinson-Lent House	Wilkinson-Lent House	September 22, 2025 (#100012250)	270 Wilkinson Road; 43°02′45″N 77°23′01″W	Perinton	
105	Wimbledon Road Historic District		August 9, 2024 (#100010617)	201-300 Wimbledon Road; 43°12′17″N 77°36′40″W	Irondequoit	
106	Windom Hall	Windom Hall	August 5, 1994 (#94000803)	28 Main St. 43°01′11″N 77°45′01″W	Scottsville	
107	Wrayholm	Wrayholm	February 21, 2025 (#100011465)	14 Meadowood; 42°57′19″N 77°43′31″W	Rush	
108	Thomas Youngs House	Thomas Youngs House	June 24, 1993 (#93000546)	50 Mitchell Rd. 43°05′00″N 77°30′17″W	Pittsford	

== See also ==
- National Register of Historic Places listings in New York
