= List of cobblestone buildings =

This is a list of cobblestone buildings, mostly houses and mostly but not all in the United States, that are notable and that reflect cobblestone architecture. Cobblestone architecture had some popularity for substantial homes and other buildings for a period, but is limited in scope of employment.

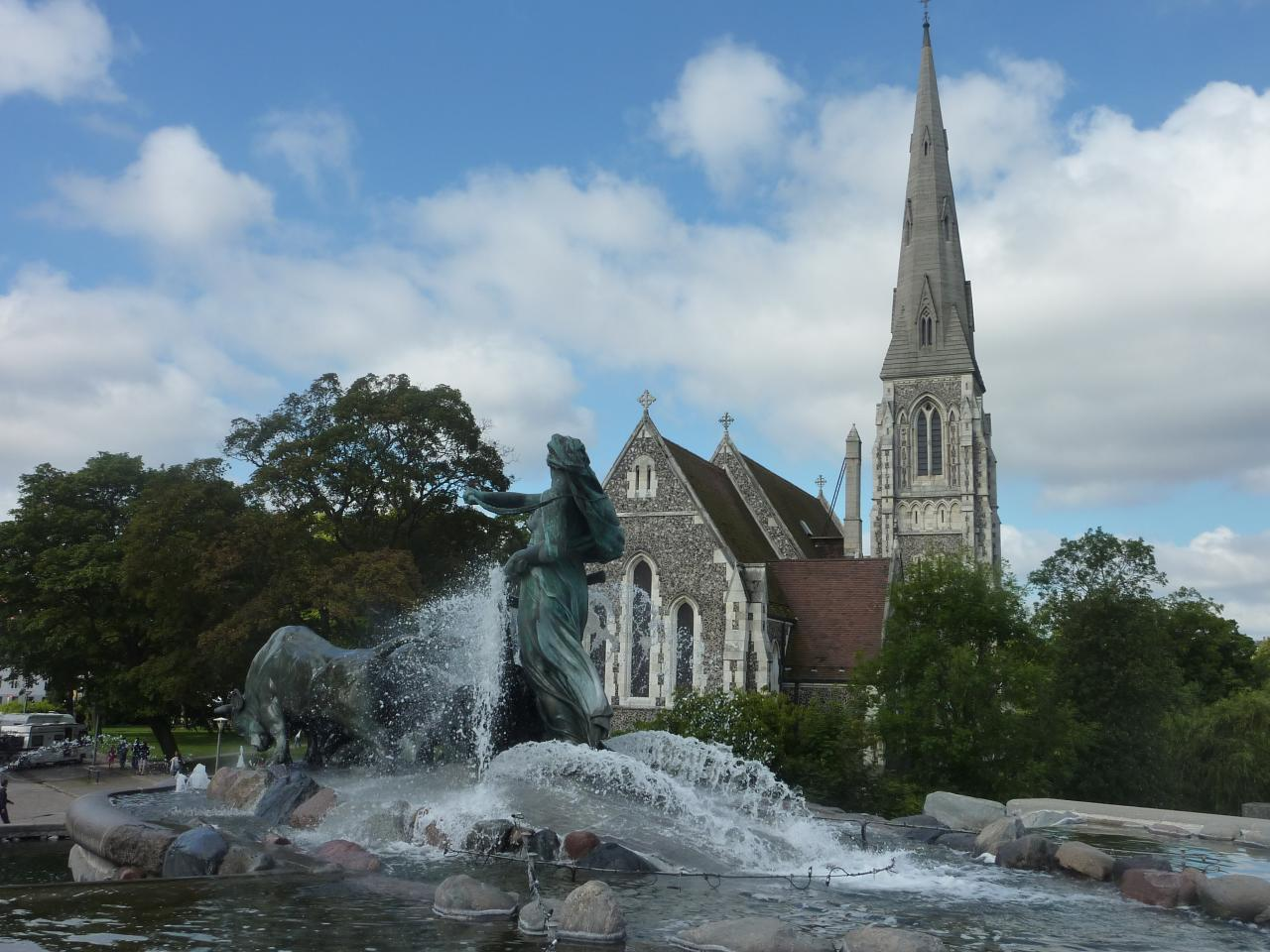
St. Alban's Church, Copenhagen

In Europe, cobblestone architecture includes the use of flint cobbles. St. Alban's Church, Copenhagen, in Denmark, was designed as a traditional English church by architect Arthur Blomfield. Gothic Revival in style, it is built in limestone from the Faxe south of Copenhagen, knapped flint from Stevns, Åland stone for the spire, and roof tiles from Broseley in Shropshire. The conspicuous use of flint as a building material, unusual in Denmark, is another typical trait from England where it is commonly seen in church buildings in the south of the country, particularly East Anglia.

In the United States, cobblestone architecture appears most significantly in New York State, and within the state generally along the Erie Canal, following from the economic prosperity brought by the canal and from the ease of transportation by barges of this heavy building material. There are numerous examples in other states as well. A number of cobblestone houses and other buildings are listed on the U.S. National Register of Historic Places.

== List ==
Notable cobblestone buildings include:

=== in the United States ===
(by state then city)

==== Colorado ====
Building	Image	Dates	Location	City, State	Description
Colorado National Guard Armory		1916 built		Golden, Colorado	

==== Illinois ====
The area around the Illinois-Wisconsin border once had the largest population of cobblestone houses outside of New York City. However, very few remain—the Illinois Historic Sites Survey in 1978 identified only two remaining. Cobblestone houses were popular among individuals who worked on the Erie Canal, and the style came to the border region from New York migrants.

Building	Image	Dates	Location	City, State	Description
Gifford-Davidson House		1850 built 1980 NRHP-listed	363-365 Prairie St. 42°2′3″N 88°16′39″W	Elgin, Illinois	Built by James Talcott Gifford, a native of central New York who became wealthy in Wisconsin, then returned in 1849 to Elgin, which he had helped found, and completed this in 1850. Cobblestone first floor; frame above. House was expanded in 1871.
Herrick Cobblestone		1847 built 1989 NRHP-listed	2127 Broadway; 42°15′8″N 89°3′44″W	Rockford, Illinois	Greek Revival in style. Built by Elijah L. Herrick, who may have been a cobblestone mason. The stones are from the nearby Rock River. Herrick came from Massachusetts to Rockford in the mid-1830s, though he probably stopped in New York on the way and came to learn of the style. One of the oldest houses in Rockford.

==== Montana ====
Building	Image	Dates	Location	City, State	Description
Sandstone and Cobblestone Schools		1910-21 built 1987 NRHP-listed	Main St. 45°30′37″N 109°26′45″W	Absarokee, Montana	

==== New Mexico ====
Building	Image	Dates	Location	City, State	Description
Moore-Ward Cobblestone House		1905 built 1985 NRHP-listed		Artesia, New Mexico	

==== New York ====
Building	Image	Dates	Location	City, State	Description
Adsit Cobblestone Farmhouse		1832 built NRHP-listed	3871 Clover St. 43°0′51″N 77°35′5″W	Mendon, New York	Federal
Angus Cobblestone Farmhouse and Barn Complex		1831 built 1992 NRHP-listed	612 NY 14; 42°44′3″N 76°58′29″W	Benton, New York	Greek Revival
J. and E. Baker Cobblestone Farmstead		1850 built 1995 NRHP-listed	815 Canandaigua Rd. 43°2′4″N 77°18′50″W	Macedon, New York	Gothic Revival
Barden Cobblestone Farmhouse		1843 built 1992 NRHP-listed	42°45′16″N 77°4′26″W	Benton, New York	Greek Revival
Levi Barden Cobblestone Farmhouse		1836 built 2003 NRHP-listed	5300 Wabash Rd. 42°46′16″N 77°2′18″W	Seneca, New York	Greek Revival
Barnard Cobblestone House		built 1989 NRHP-listed	7192 W. Main St. 42°54′12″N 77°37′3″W	Lima, New York	Greek Revival, Federal
First Baptist Church of Phelps		1845 built 1992 NRHP-listed	40 Church St., Phelps, New York; 42°57′18″N 77°3′31″W	Phelps, New York	Greek Revival
School No. 6		built NRHP-listed	6679 Jenks Rd.	Lima, New York	
Bates Cobblestone Farmhouse		1836 built 1992 NRHP-listed	5521 NY 364; 42°45′34″N 77°16′25″W	Middlesex, New York	Mid 19th Century Revival
Jackson Blood Cobblestone House		1846 built 2005 NRHP-listed	43°19′0″N 78°23′20″W	Lyndonville, New York	Greek Revival
Butterfield Cobblestone House		1849 built 2010 NRHP-listed	43°11′9″N 78°1′2″W	Holley, New York	Greek Revival
Chase Cobblestone Farmhouse		built 1995 NRHP-listed		Hilton, New York	
Cobblestone Farmhouse at 1027 Stone Church Rd.		c.1840 built 2007 NRHP-listed		Junius, New York	
Cobblestone Farmhouse at 1111 Stone Church Road		c.1830 built 2007 NRHP-listed	1111 Stone Church Rd.	Junius, New York	Federal
Cobblestone Farmhouse at 1229 Birdsey Road		1840 built 2008 NRHP-listed	1229 Birdsey Road; 42°58′1.34″N 76°51′51.02″W--->	Junius, New York	
Cobblestone Historic District		1834-1839 built 1993 NRHP-listed	43°17′13″N 78°11′27″W	Childs, New York	
Cobblestone House (Bath, New York)		1851 built 1983 NRHP-listed	120 W. Washington St. 42°20′15″N 77°19′28″W	Bath, New York	Greek Revival
Cobblestone House (Cazenovia, New York)		1840 built 1987 NRHP-listed	42°56′35″N 75°52′59″W	Cazenovia, New York	Greek Revival
Cobblestone Inn		built 2007 NRHP-listed	43°16′28″N 78°19′59″W	Oak Orchard, New York	Greek Revival
Cobblestone Manor		1835 built 1984 NRHP-listed	495 N. Main St. 42°54′8″N 77°17′30″W	Canandaigua, New York	Greek Revival
Cobblestone Railroad Pumphouse		1845 built 1992 NRHP-listed		Victor, New York	
Cole Cobblestone Farmhouse		1832 built 1996 NRHP-listed		Mendon, New York	
Coolidge Stores Building		1851 built 2001 NRHP-listed	US 20; 42°53′21″N 75°33′7″W	Bouckville, New York	Greek Revival
Coverdale Cobblestone House		1837 built 2005 NRHP-listed		Leicester, New York	
William Covert Cobblestone Farmhouse		1835 built 1995 NRHP-listed		Greece, New York	
Isaac Cox Cobblestone Farmstead		1838 built 2003 NRHP-listed		Scottsville, New York	
Jephtha Earl Cobblestone Farmhouse		c.1855 built 1992 NRHP-listed		Benton, New York	
Felt Cobblestone General Store		1835 built 1992 NRHP-listed		Victor, New York	
Ganoung Cobblestone Farmhouse		built NRHP-listed		Lima, New York	
Gates-Livermore Cobblestone Farmhouse		1833 built 1996 NRHP-listed	4389 Clover St. 42°59′29″N 77°34′51″W	Mendon, New York	Federal
John Graves Cobblestone Farmhouse		1837 built 2008 NRHP-listed		Junius, New York	
Harmon Cobblestone Farmhouse and Cobblestone Smokehouse		1842 built 1992 NRHP-listed		Phelps, New York	
Howland Cobblestone Store		built 1994 NRHP-listed		Scipio, New York	
William Huffman Cobblestone House		1845 built 2002 NRHP-listed		Phelps, New York	
Hiram Lay Cobblestone Farmhouse		built 2009 NRHP-listed		Tyre, New York	
Markham Cobblestone Farmhouse and Barn Complex		built NRHP-listed		Lima, New York	
Mendon Cobblestone Academy		built NRHP-listed		Mendon, New York	
Morgan Cobblestone Farmhouse		built NRHP-listed		Lima, New York	
Philo Newton Cobblestone House		built NRHP-listed		Hartland, New York	
William Nichols Cobblestone Farmhouse		built NRHP-listed		Benton, New York	
Payne Cobblestone House		built NRHP-listed		Conesus, New York	
Preston-Gaylord Cobblestone Farmhouse		built NRHP-listed		Sodus, New York	
Rippey Cobblestone Farmhouse		built NRHP-listed		Seneca, New York	
Simon Ritter Cobblestone Farmhouse		built NRHP-listed		Varick, New York	
Roe Cobblestone Schoolhouse		built NRHP-listed		Butler, New York	
Sheldon Cobblestone House		built NRHP-listed		Mendon, New York	
John Shelp Cobblestone House		built NRHP-listed		Middleport, New York	
Sliker Cobblestone House		built NRHP-listed		Conesus, New York	
Dr. Henry Spence Cobblestone Farmhouse and Barn Complex		1840s built 1992 NRHP-listed		Starkey, New York	
Stewart Cobblestone Farmhouse		built NRHP-listed		Mendon, New York	
Daniel Supplee Cobblestone Farmhouse		built NRHP-listed		Starkey, New York	
Tinker Cobblestone Farmstead		built NRHP-listed		Henrietta, New York	
Walling Cobblestone Tavern		built NRHP-listed		Sodus, New York	
Wallington Cobblestone Schoolhouse District No. 8		built NRHP-listed		Sodus, New York	
Whitcomb Cobblestone Farmhouse		built NRHP-listed		Mendon, New York	
Young-Leach Cobblestone Farmhouse and Barn Complex		c.1836 built 1992 NRHP-listed	2601 NY 14; 42°38′16″N 76°56′21″W	Torrey, New York	Greek Revival, Federal, Vernacular Greek Revival
James Coolidge Octagon House			7271 Main St. 42°53′52.82″N 75°31′1.6″W	Madison, New York	A rare example of a cobblestone house that is also an octagon house. Has a Greek Revival-style entrance with Doric columns.
Charles Bullis House		1838-42 built 19xx NRHP	1727 Canandaigua Rd., Macedon, New York; 43°4′10″N 77°19′14″W	Wayne	

==== Ohio ====
Building	Image	Dates	Location	City, State	Description
C.R. Howard House		1853 built 1974 NRHP-listed	411 E. Garfield St. 41°19′04″N 81°19′51″W	Aurora, Ohio	Two-story house with a steep gable, with eaves decorated by scroll-sawn vergeboard, topped by an octagonal pinnacle and pendant. Believed to be the only one of two cobblestone homes within the Western Reserve area.
Cobble-Cote	[]	1834 built	2060 White Pond Drive. 41°19′04″N 81°19′51″W	Akron, Ohio	Two-story house with sun porch addition. Refurbished and remodeled in the 1920s. Floors are reclaimed wood from houses of a similar age that were demolished. Believed to be one of two cobblestone houses within the Western Reserve area. The rear walkway is constructed of 92 millstones of unknown origin.

==== Washington ====
The Basalt Cobblestone Quarries District contains seven historic quarries which provided cobblestones for Portland streets.

==== Wisconsin ====
Building	Image	Dates	Location	City, State	Description
Cobblestone House (Eau Claire, Wisconsin)		1866 built 1974 NRHP-listed	1011 State St. 44°48′18″N 91°29′38″W	Eau Claire, Wisconsin	Gothic
Haseltine Cobblestone House		1842 built 1980 NRHP-listed	W230 S8235 Big Bend Dr. 42°53′38″N 88°12′34″W	Big Bend, Wisconsin	Greek Revival
Samuel S. Jones Cobblestone House		1847 built 1978 NRHP-listed		Clinton, Wisconsin	Greek Revival
Daniel and Catherine Ketchum Cobblestone House		1851 built 2001 NRHP-listed	147 E. 2nd St.	Marquette, Wisconsin	Greek Revival
Lathrop-Munn Cobblestone House		ca. 1848 built 1977 NRHP-listed	524 Bluff St.	Beloit, Wisconsin	Greek Revival
Meyerhofer Cobblestone House		ca. 1850 built 1980 NRHP-listed	Townline Rd.	Lake Geneva, Wisconsin	Colonial, Greek Revival
Richardson-Brinkman Cobblestone House		1843 built 1977 NRHP-listed	607 W. Milwaukee Rd. 42°33′27″N 88°51′58″W	Clinton, Wisconsin	Greek Revival
Justin Weed House		1848 built 1974 NRHP-listed	3509 Washington Rd.	Kenosha, Wisconsin	Greek Revival

== See also ==
- Cobblestone
- List of cobblestone streets
