= Park Avenue Summer Art Festival =

- Genre: Art festival, street festival
- Frequency: Annual
- Locations: Park Avenue, Rochester, New York
- Established: 1976
- Attendance: ~250,000
- Website: park-avenue.org

The Park Avenue Summer Art Festival, commonly known as the Park Ave Fest, is an annual street art and craft festival held on Park Avenue in Rochester, New York, United States. Established in 1976, the festival spans approximately 1.25 miles (2.01 km) of Park Avenue from Alexander Street to Culver Road and features more than 350 artists, craftspeople, and exhibitors from across the United States and Canada. At its peak, the two-day event in August drew approximately 250,000 visitors, making it one of the largest street festivals in Western New York.

The festival is organized by the Park Avenue Merchants Association and the Park Avenue Revitalization Committee (PARC).

== History ==
The Park Avenue Summer Art Festival was first held in 1976 as a neighborhood celebration of the arts along Rochester's Park Avenue commercial corridor. Over the following decades, the festival grew into one of the region's signature summer events, featuring juried fine art and craft vendors, live music on multiple stages, dance performances, street performers, and more than 40 food vendors.

== Festival features ==
The festival showcases a juried selection of visual arts including painting, sculpture, photography, ceramics, jewelry, and mixed media. Multiple stages host live music and dance performances throughout the weekend. Over 40 food vendors line the avenue, offering a range of local and regional cuisine.

== COVID-19 disruptions and aftermath ==
The festival was canceled in 2020 due to the COVID-19 pandemic. It was again canceled in 2021 due to ongoing sponsorship and public health challenges. In 2022, organizers announced a third consecutive cancellation, citing the loss of corporate sponsorship revenue during the pandemic period. Local lawmakers expressed concern over the festival's future and the broader economic impact on the Park Avenue business district.

In 2023, the event returned in a scaled-down format as the "Park Avenue Summer Stroll," a smaller and more intimate community gathering rather than the full-scale festival. A change in organizational leadership was also reported during this period.

== Park Avenue neighborhood ==
Park Avenue is located in southeast Rochester in the Park Central neighborhood. The surrounding residential area features intact early 20th-century housing stock, including many architect-designed homes. On February 20, 2020, the Park Avenue Historic District was listed on the National Register of Historic Places, following a three-year nomination effort that cost approximately $55,000.

== See also ==
- Rochester, New York
- List of festivals in New York
- National Register of Historic Places listings in Monroe County, New York
