= Hiram Sibley Homestead =

Historic house in New York, United States

- U.S. National Register of Historic Places
- Location within New York Location within the United States
- Location: 29 Sibley Road, Mendon, New York
- Coordinates: 42°58′6″N 77°36′56″W
- Area: 26 acres (11 ha)
- Built: 1827
- Architectural style: Federal
- NRHP reference No.: 85002291
- Added to NRHP: September 12, 1985

Hiram Sibley Homestead is a historic home located in the town of Mendon in Monroe County, New York. More specifically, the homestead is in the hamlet of Sibleyville, named in honor of Hiram Sibley.

== History ==
The wood frame Federal-style house was built about 1827 and consists of five sections. The original house includes the 2 1/2-story rectangular main section and the attached 2-story north and west wings. In 1928, the structure was moved from the roadside to a nearby bank of the Honeoye Creek. It was built by Sibley and was the site of his initial business ventures in milling and manufacturing.

It was listed on the National Register of Historic Places in 1985.

== Gallery ==
Images of Hiram Sibley home in Rochester, NY

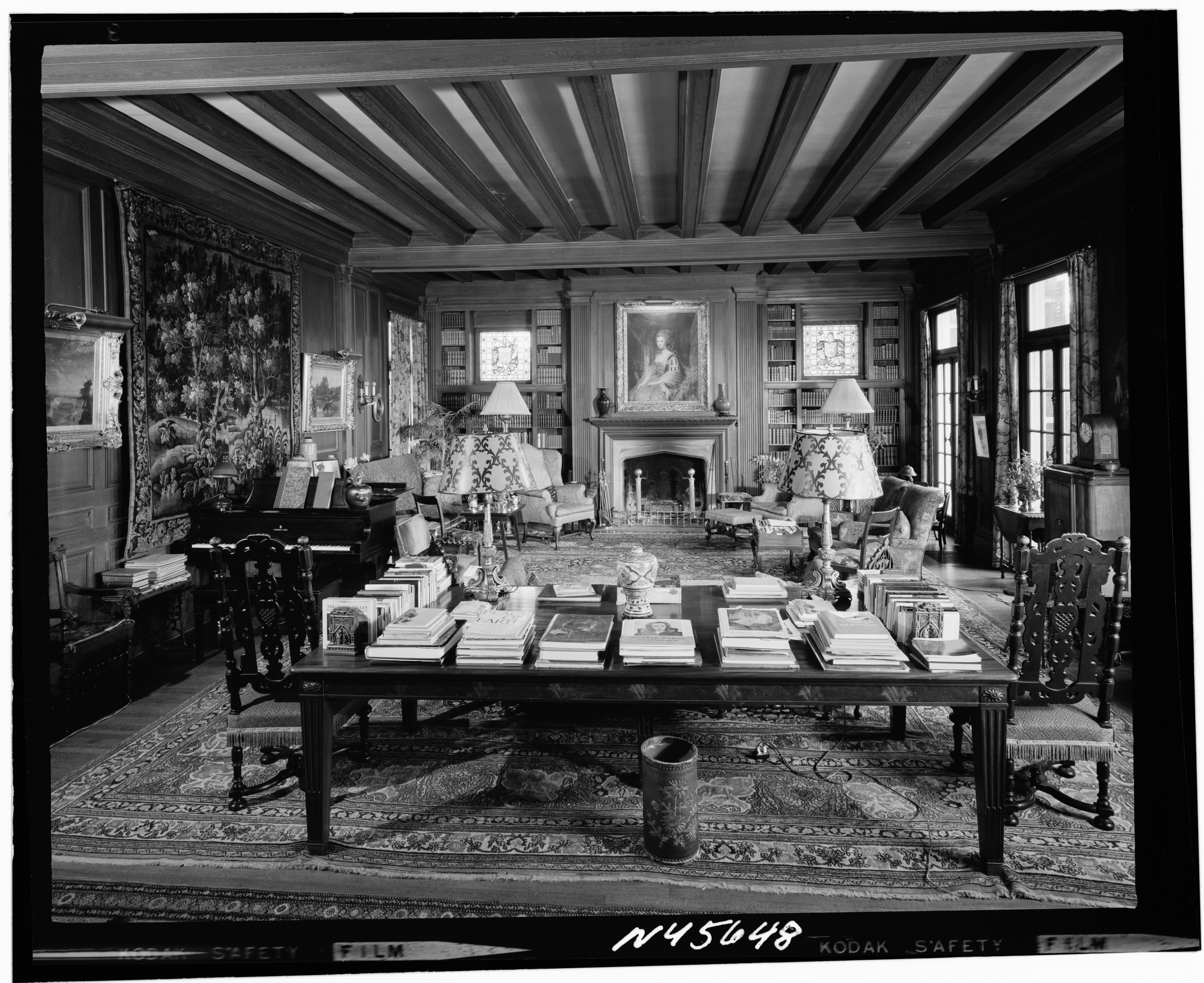
Hiram Sibley House, 400 East Avenue, Rochester, New York. First floor library, winter 1968

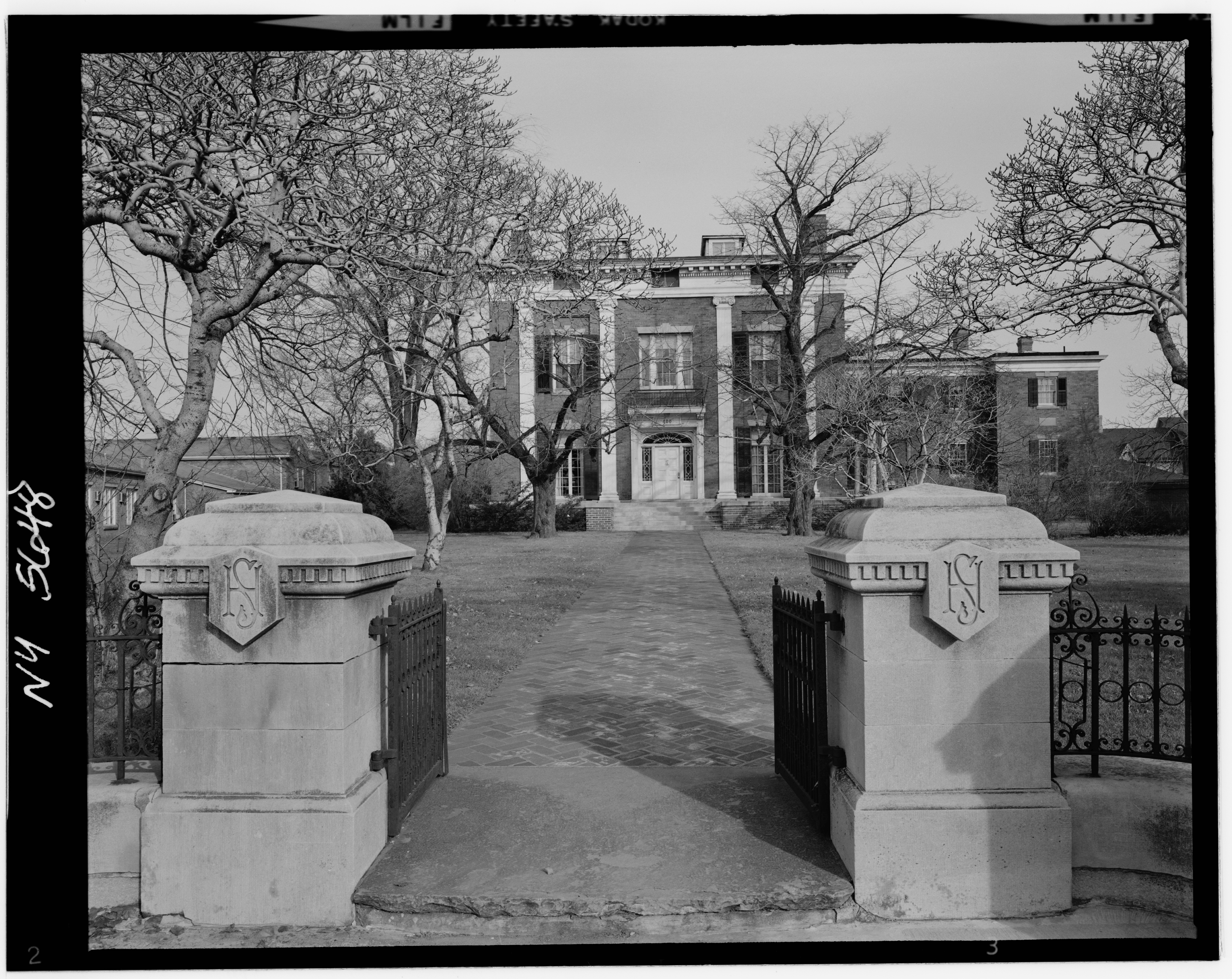
Hiram Sibley House, 400 East Avenue, Rochester, New York. View of south façade, winter 1968

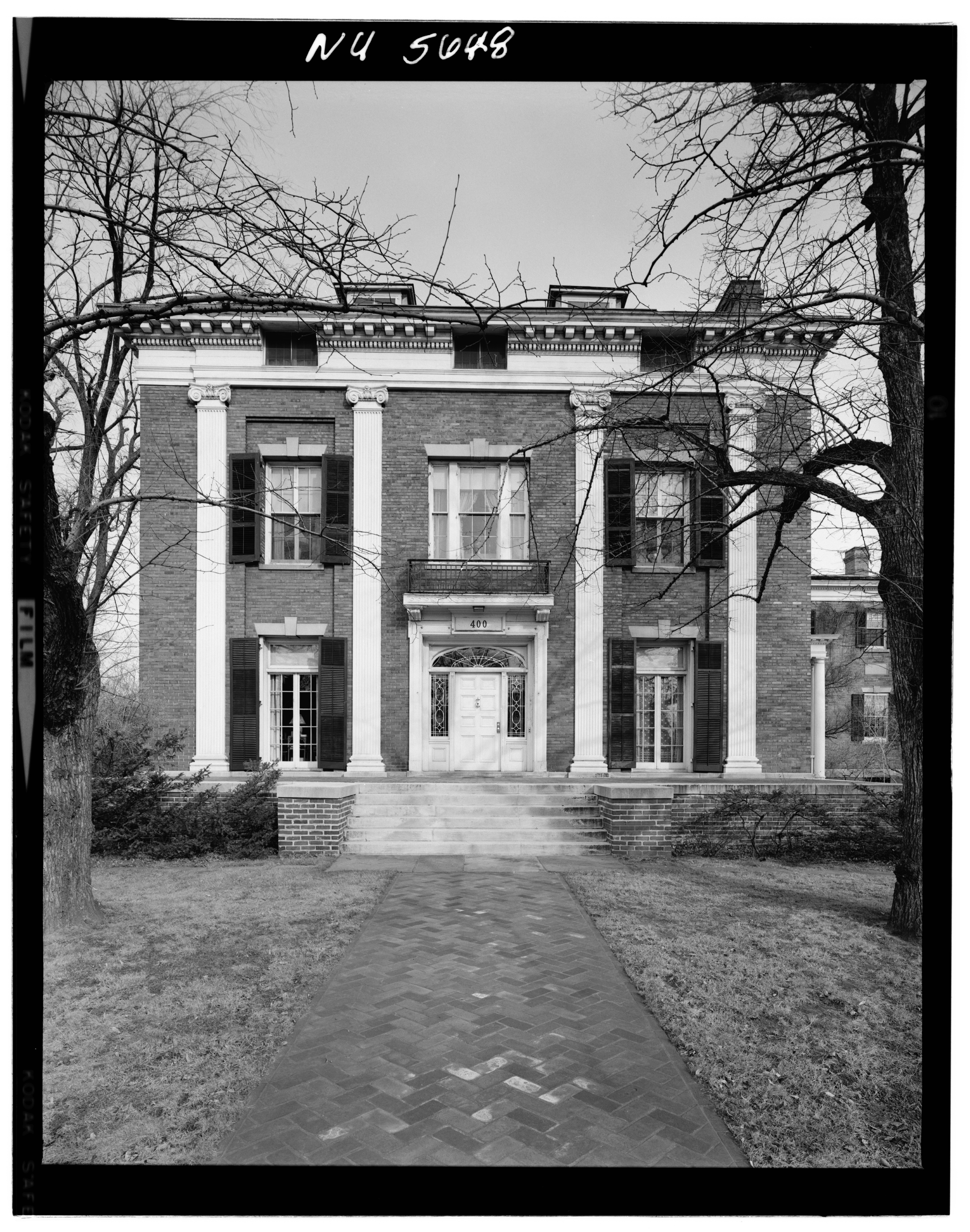
Hiram Sibley House, 400 East Avenue, Rochester, New York. South façade, winter 1968

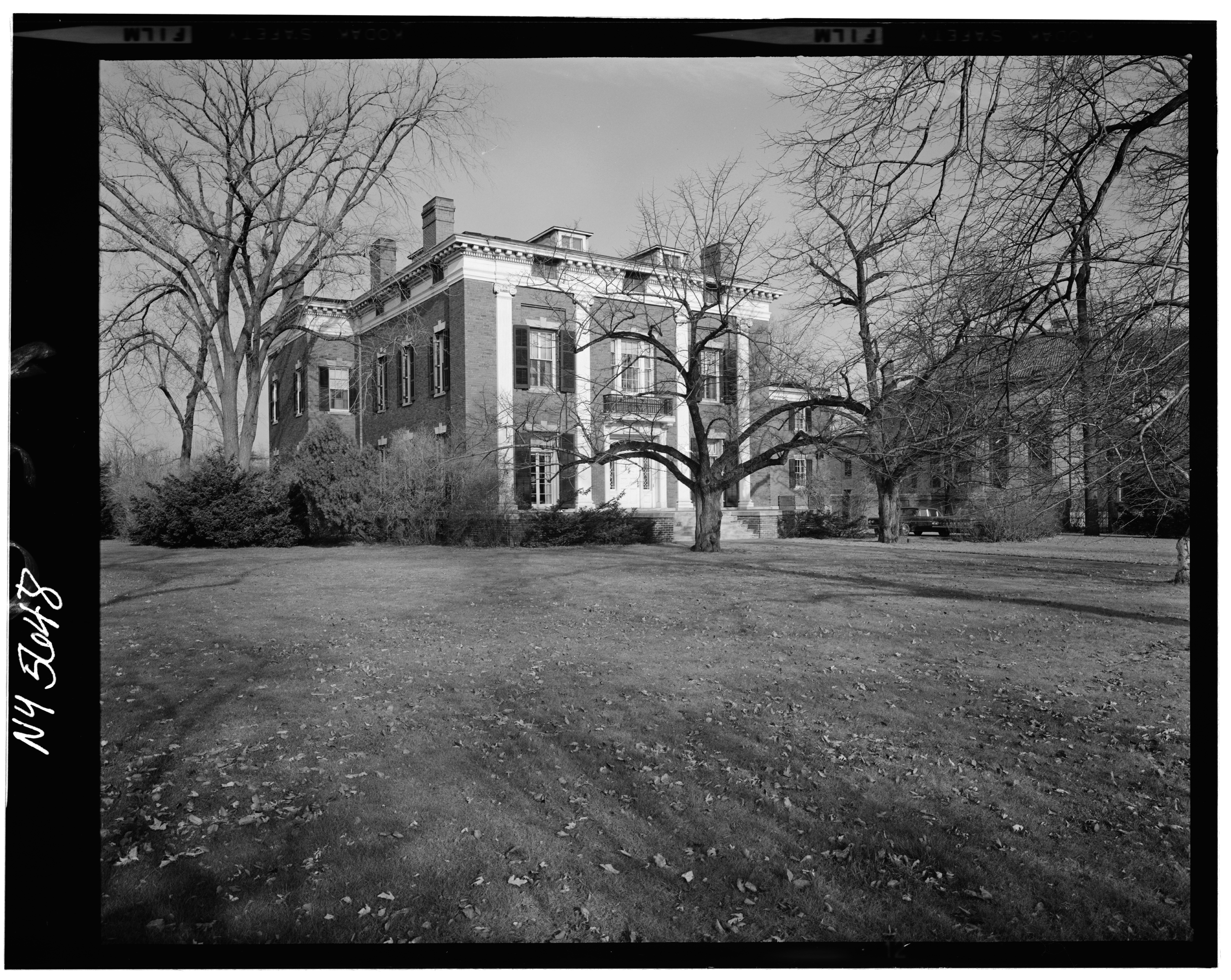
Hiram Sibley House, 400 East Avenue, Rochester, New York. View of façade from southwest, winter 1968

== See also ==
- National Register of Historic Places listings in Monroe County, New York
