= Mendon Ponds Park =

Park in Monroe County, New York

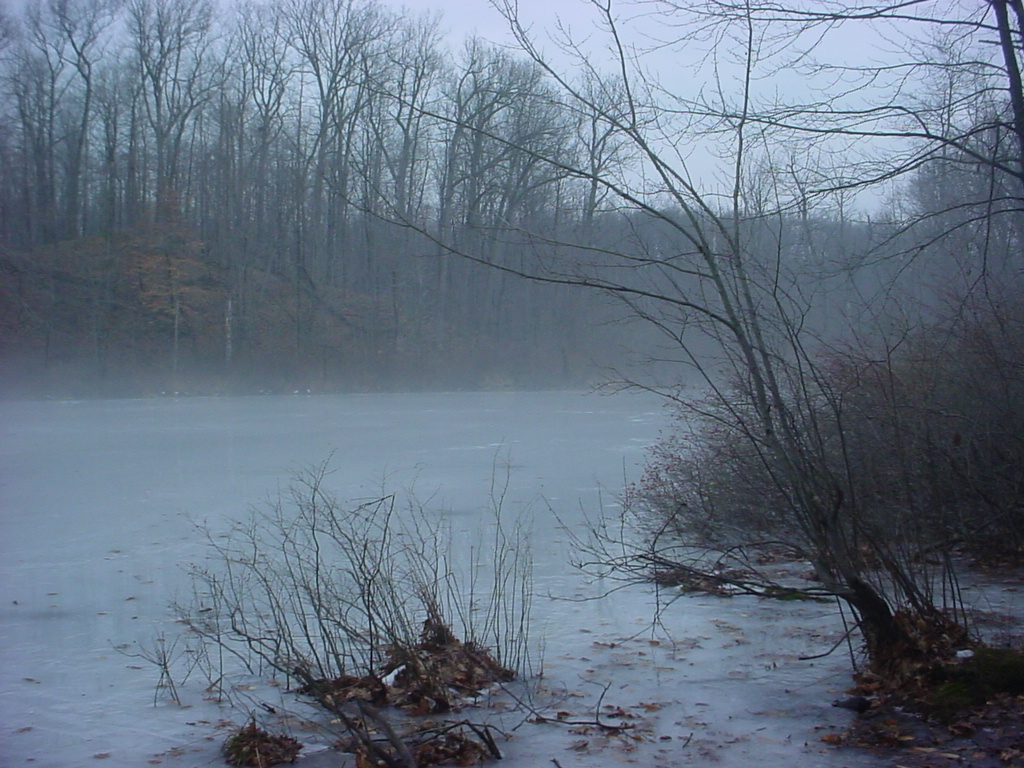
- Devil's Bathtub, Mendon Ponds Park.

- Location within New York
- Type: Regional park
- Location: Towns of Pittsford and Mendon, Monroe County, New York
- Nearest city: Rochester
- Coordinates: 43°00′56″N 77°33′50″W
- Area: 2,500 acres (10 km^{2})
- Operator: Monroe County Parks Department
- Open: All year

U.S. National Natural Landmark
- Designated: 1967

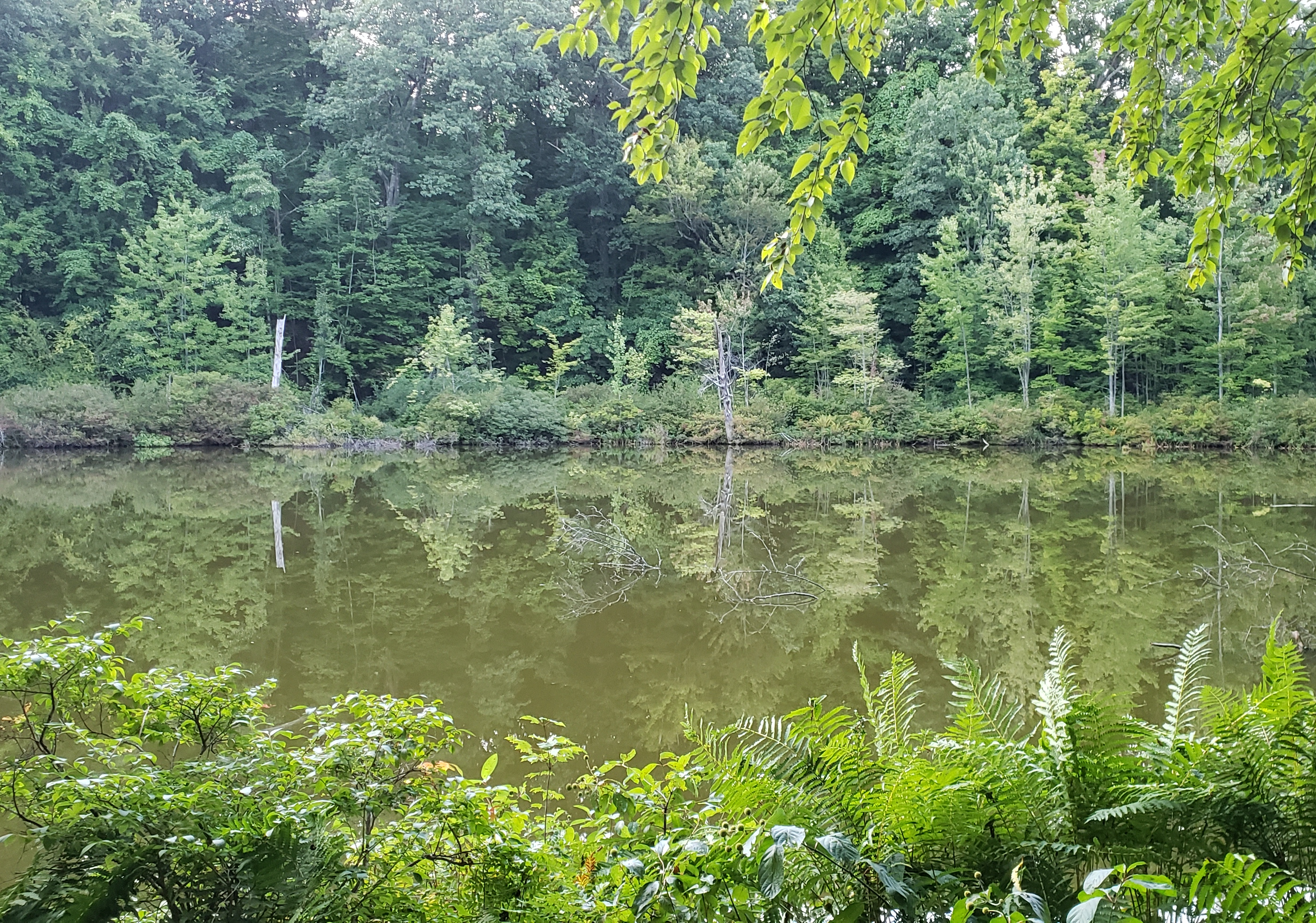
The Devil's Bathtub.

Mendon Ponds Park is a county park located southeast of Rochester, New York within the suburban towns of Mendon and Pittsford. At over 2,500 acres (10 km^{2}), it is the largest park in Monroe County. It was designated a National Natural Landmark in 1967 in recognition of its unique glacial geology. Monroe County acquired the first 1,400 acres of the park in 1928 for $185,000 (USD).

== Geography ==
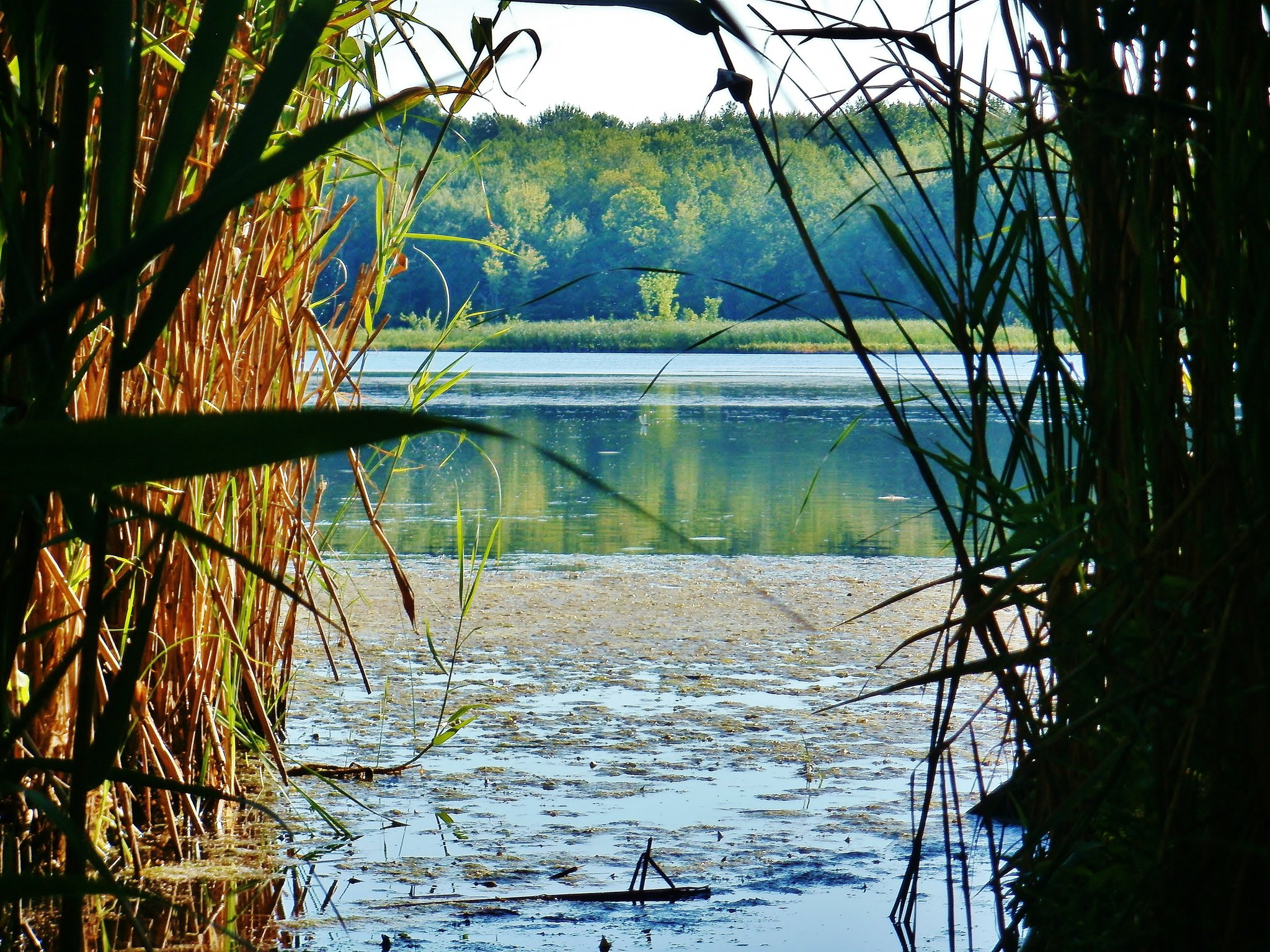
A view over the pond through the reeds at Mendon Ponds Park in Mendon, taken in 2012.

Mendon Ponds contains a number of unique glacially created land structures, including a kettle hole known as the "Devil's Bathtub", eskers, a floating sphagnum moss peat bog, and kames.

At the northwestern end of the line of other glacial ponds and lakes near the meromictic "Devil's Bathtub", there is a sphagnum moss peat bog, where the build-up of moss has created a floating island in the middle of the lake. Due to the acidity buildup and lack of decay caused by the sphagnum moss, the bog is home to a number of carnivorous plants, including sundew and pitcher plants.

== Wildlife ==
Mendon Ponds is known locally as a birdwatching destination. Birds present in the wetland areas include wood duck, red-winged blackbird, blue heron, Canada goose, Virginia rail, sora, least and American bittern, and American coot. Passerine birds of the park are typified by eastern bluebird, scarlet tanager, tyrant flycatchers, vireo, chickadees, and nuthatches. In winter, the park's chickadees take seed from patient visitors' hands.

The park's Quaker Pond is home to a long-standing population of beavers. Muskrats, foxes, deer, and mink are also frequently observed within the park's borders.

Wild Wings, a nonprofit organization that houses and cares for injured birds of prey, is headquartered near the park's southwestern edge.

== Recreation ==
Mendon Ponds Park provides many recreational facilities, including 21 miles (34 km) of hiking and sightseeing trails, shelters and lodges, fishing. A sensory garden is also present within the park catering to disabled patrons. The park is a popular destination for equestrians with its many miles of riding trails and unique scenery. During the winter months, several trails are groomed for cross-country skiing.

== See also ==
- List of National Natural Landmarks in New York
