= Mendon Presbyterian Church =

Historic church in New York, United States

- U.S. National Register of Historic Places
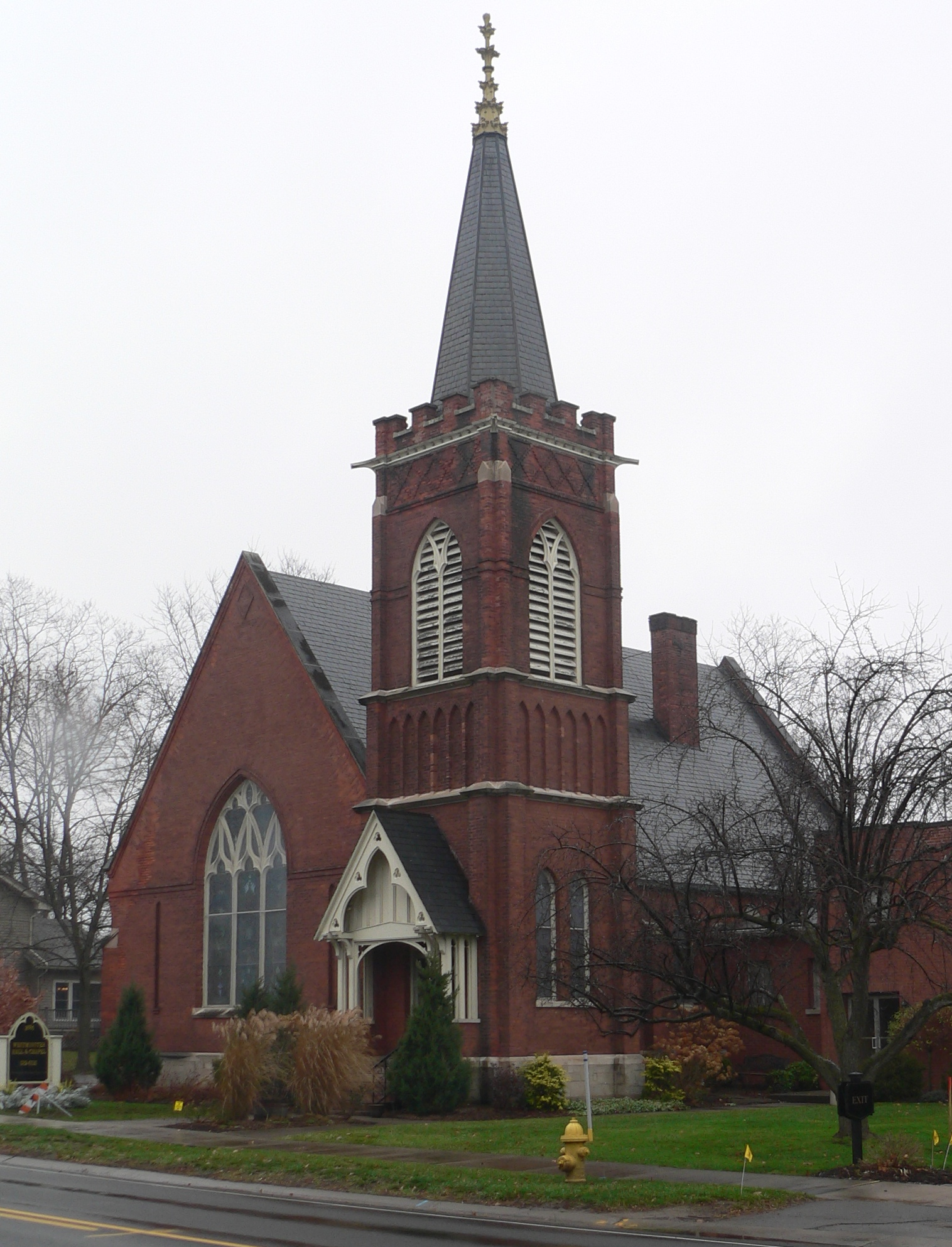
- View from the southeast

- Location within New York Location within the United States
- Location: 3886 Rush-Mendon Rd., Mendon, New York
- Coordinates: 43°0′0″N 77°30′25″W
- Area: 1 acre (0.40 ha)
- Architectural style: Gothic
- NRHP reference No.: 05001455
- Added to NRHP: December 23, 2005

Mendon Presbyterian Church is a historic Presbyterian church located at Mendon in Monroe County, New York.

The building is an eclectic Gothic Revival style building constructed in 1900. Its interior features a "Combination Church Plan" incorporating a meeting room with the main auditorium separated by a set of large folding doors.

The building was listed on the National Register of Historic Places in 2005.

The congregation moved to a new building on Cheese Factory Road in the Town of Mendon in 2006, and merged with Centerway Church in 2023.
