= Adsit Cobblestone Farmhouse =

Historic house in New York, United States

- U.S. National Register of Historic Places
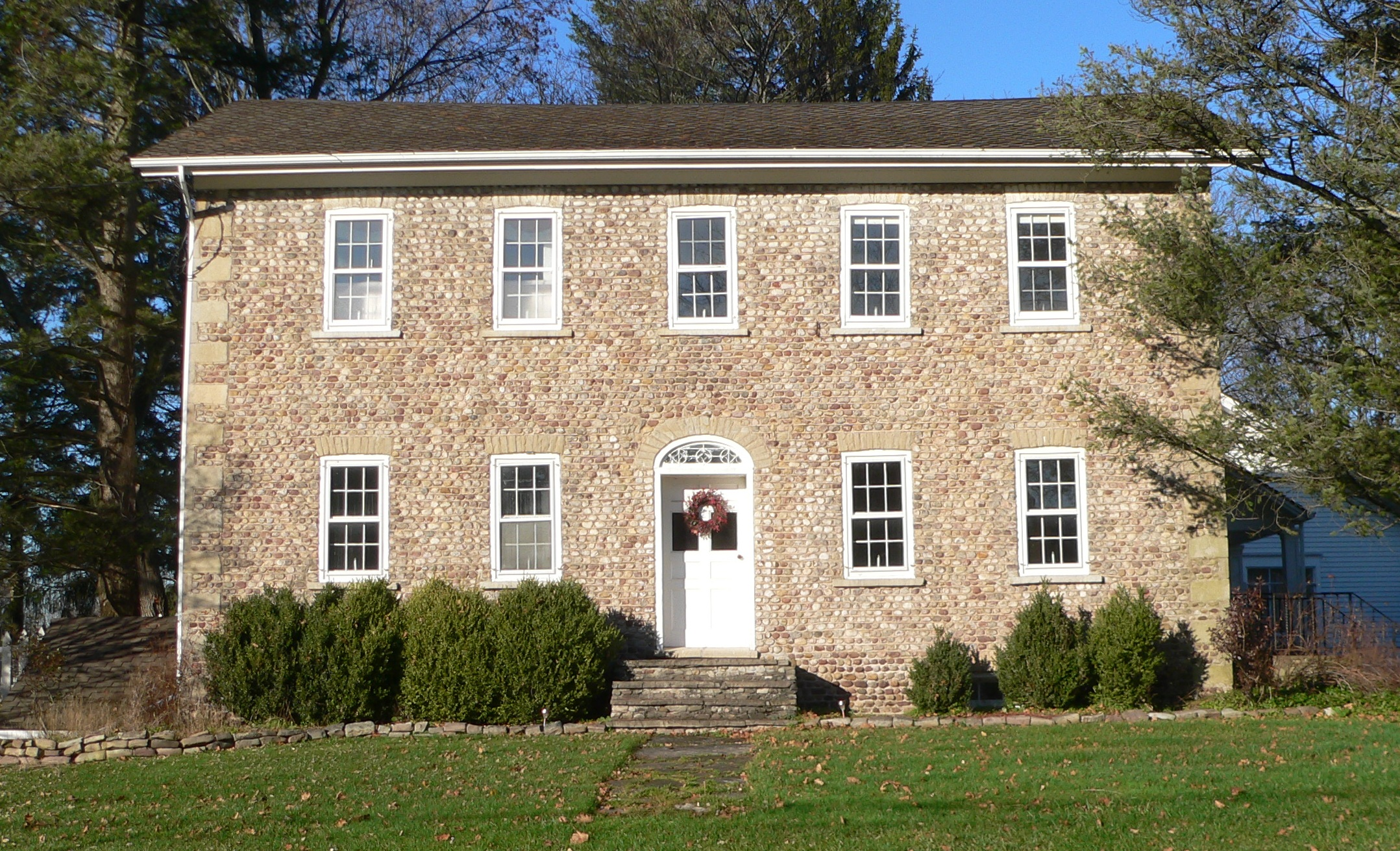

- Location within New York Location within the United States
- Location: 3871 Clover St., Mendon, New York
- Coordinates: 43°0′51″N 77°35′5″W
- Area: 2 acres (0.81 ha)
- Built: 1832
- Architectural style: Federal
- MPS: Cobblestone Architecture of New York State MPS
- NRHP reference No.: 96001393
- Added to NRHP: November 29, 1996

Adsit Cobblestone Farmhouse is a historic home located at Mendon in Monroe County, New York. It is a Federal style cobblestone farmhouse built about 1832. It served as an inn during the mid-19th century and was a popular stopover for farmers delivering grain on the road from Canandaigua to Rochester. It is constructed of medium-sized field cobbles and is one of only 10 surviving cobblestone buildings in Mendon.

It was listed on the National Register of Historic Places in 1996.
