= Miller–Horton–Barben Farm =

- U.S. National Register of Historic Places
- U.S. Historic district
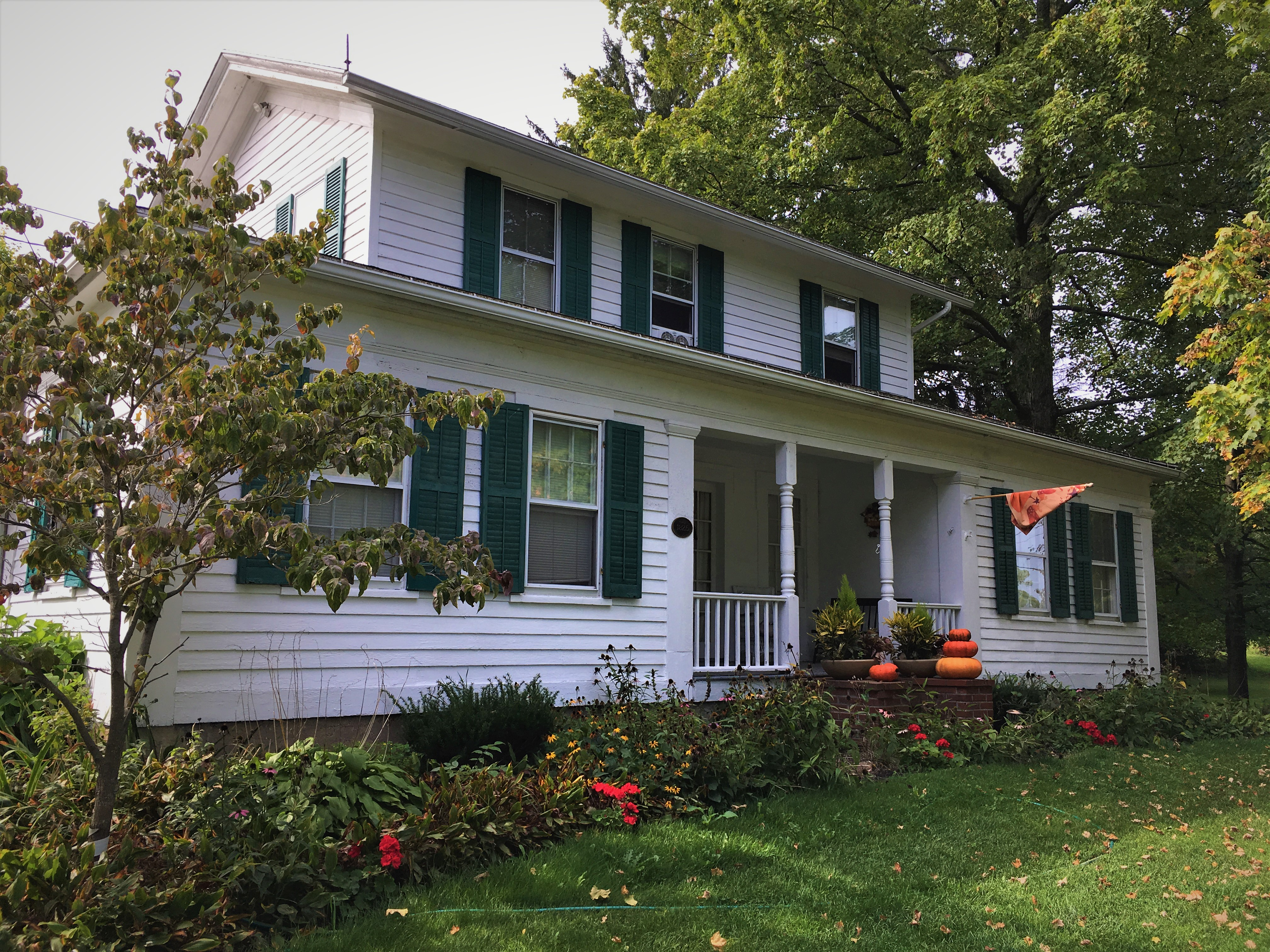

- Location within New York Location within the United States
- Location: 983 W. Bloomfield Rd., Mendon, New York
- Coordinates: 42°59′34″N 77°31′42″W
- Area: 73.57 acres (29.77 ha)
- Built: 1808, 1811, c. 1825, c. 1850
- Architectural style: Greek Revival
- NRHP reference No.: 14001161
- Added to NRHP: January 14, 2015

Miller–Horton–Barben Farm is a historic home and farm and national historic district located at Mendon in Monroe County, New York. The farm was established about 1808, and is one of the oldest in town. It includes a Greek Revival style homestead built between about 1822 and 1825, a Greek Revival barn (c. 1850), a gambrel roofed barn (c. 1920), an English barn (c. 1825), and a brick smokehouse (c. 1850). The house is seven bays wide and has a three-story recessed entrance and setback second story. It is of post and beam construction and sheathed in clapboard. Also on the property is the Miller-Barben Cemetery, with burials dating between 1811 and 1858.

It was listed on the National Register of Historic Places in 2015.
