= Parkside Whispering Pines =

- Tall Maples Miniature Golf Course
- U.S. National Register of Historic Places
- U.S. Historic district
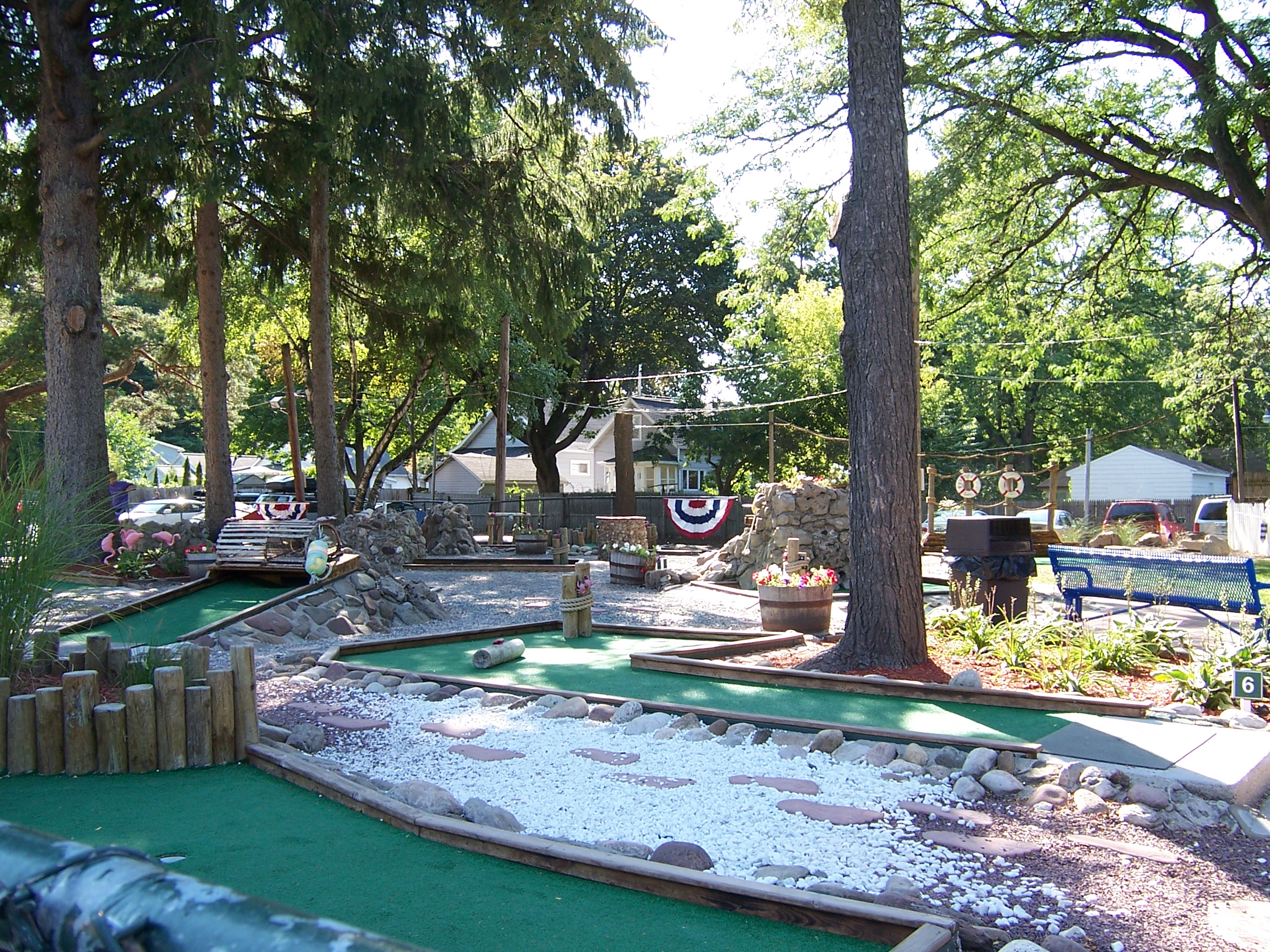
- Parkside Whispering Pines, August 2012

- Location within New York Location within the United States
- Location: 4383 Culver Rd., Sea Breeze, New York
- Coordinates: 43°13′42″N 77°32′50″W
- Area: 0.3 acres (0.12 ha)
- Built: 1930
- Architect: Ocorr, Robert; et al.
- NRHP reference No.: 02001653
- Added to NRHP: December 31, 2002

Parkside Whispering Pines, once known as Tall Maples Miniature Golf Course, is a miniature golf course and national historic district located at the hamlet of Sea Breeze in the Town of Irondequoit in Monroe County, New York. It was built in 1930 and is a rare surviving example of a miniature golf course that dates from the sport's first period of broad based popularity.

It was listed, under its former name, on the National Register of Historic Places in 2002.
