= Donald Mann House =

Historic house in New York, United States

- U.S. National Register of Historic Places
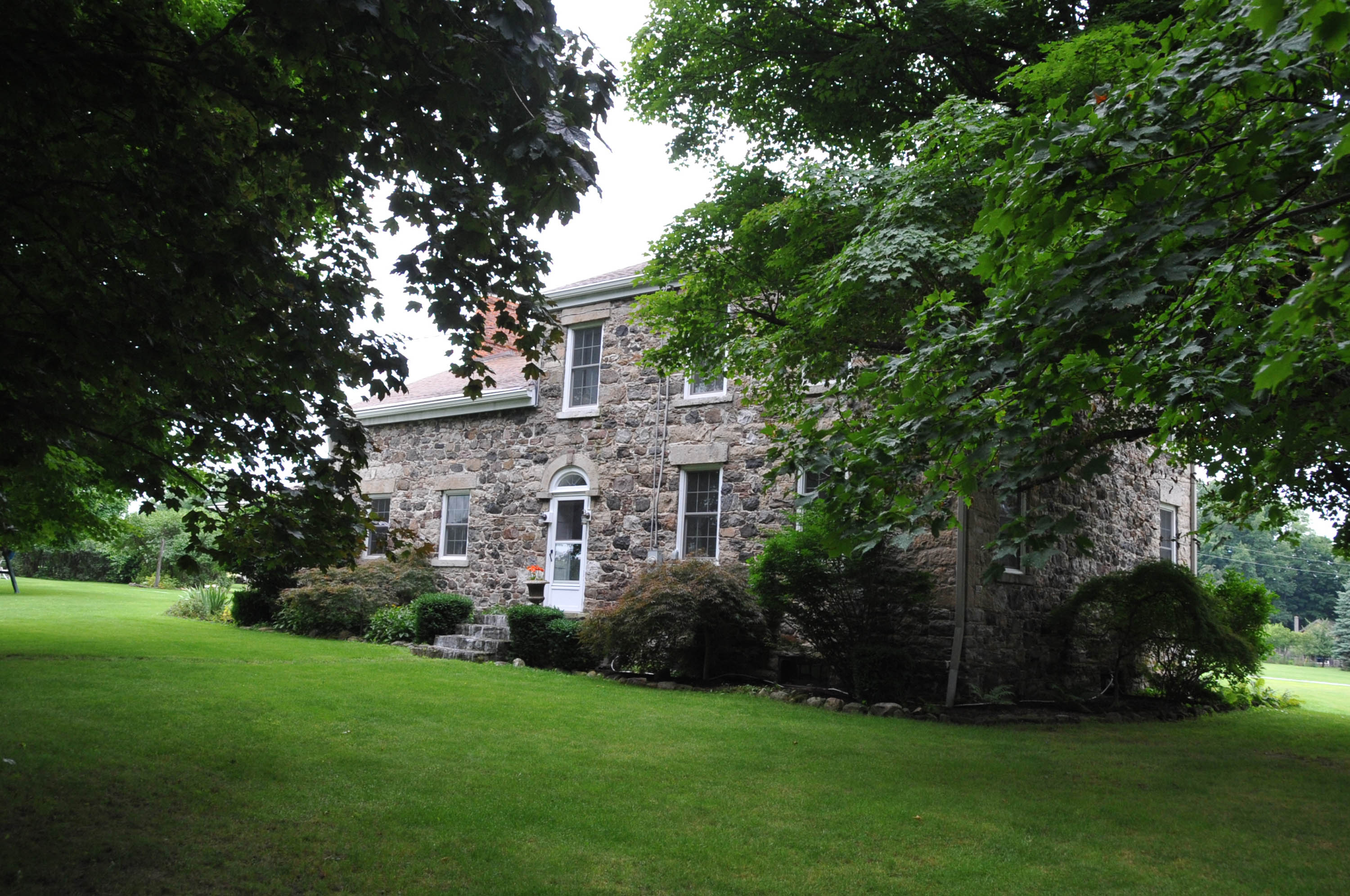
- Donald Mann House, January 2008

- Location within New York Location within the United States
- Location: 327 Stewart Rd., Scottsville, New York
- Coordinates: 43°00′03″N 77°48′17″W
- Area: 2.8 acres (1.1 ha)
- Built: c. 1830
- Architectural style: Late Federal
- NRHP reference No.: 13000449
- Added to NRHP: June 25, 2013

Donald Mann House is a historic home located at Scottsville, Monroe County, New York. It was built about 1830, and is a two-story, Late Federal stone farmhouse with a 1 1/2-story side wing. It has a garage addition and stone porch (now enclosed) added about 1900. Also on the property is a contributing stone outbuilding.

It was listed on the National Register of Historic Places in 2013.
