= Gates-Livermore Cobblestone Farmhouse =

Historic house in New York, United States

- U.S. National Register of Historic Places
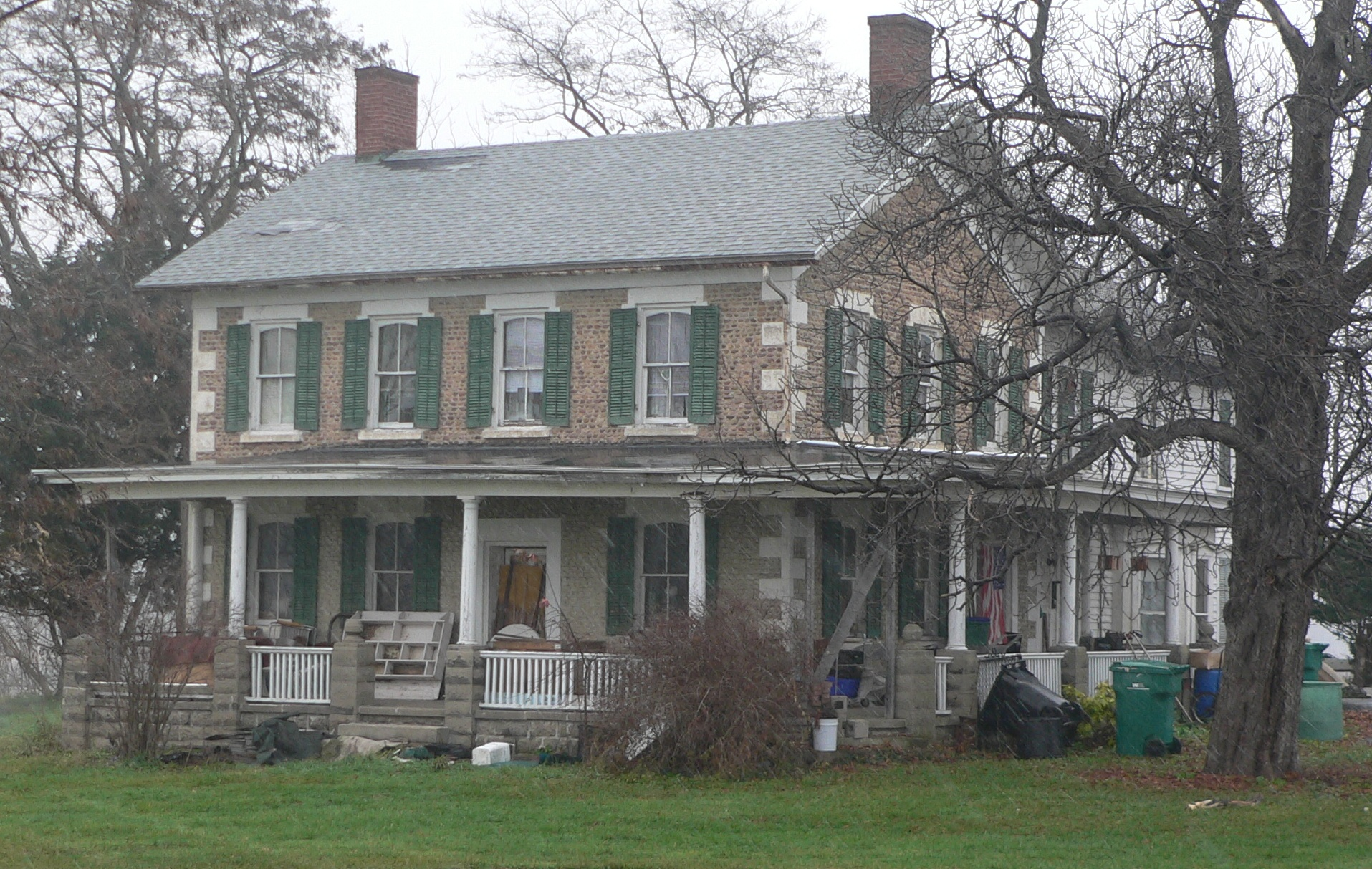
- View from the southeast

- Location within New York Location within the United States
- Location: 4389 Clover St., Mendon, New York
- Coordinates: 42°59′29″N 77°34′51″W
- Area: 95.4 acres (38.6 ha)
- Built: 1833
- Architectural style: Federal
- MPS: Cobblestone Architecture of New York State MPS
- NRHP reference No.: 96001390
- Added to NRHP: November 29, 1996

Gates-Livermore Cobblestone Farmhouse is a historic home located at Mendon in Monroe County, New York. It is a Federal style cobblestone farmhouse built about 1833. It is constructed of medium-sized field cobbles and is one of only 10 surviving cobblestone buildings in Mendon. Also on the property are an extensive collection of agricultural support structures.

It was listed on the National Register of Historic Places in 1996.
