= Sheldon Cobblestone House =

Historic house in New York, United States

- U.S. National Register of Historic Places
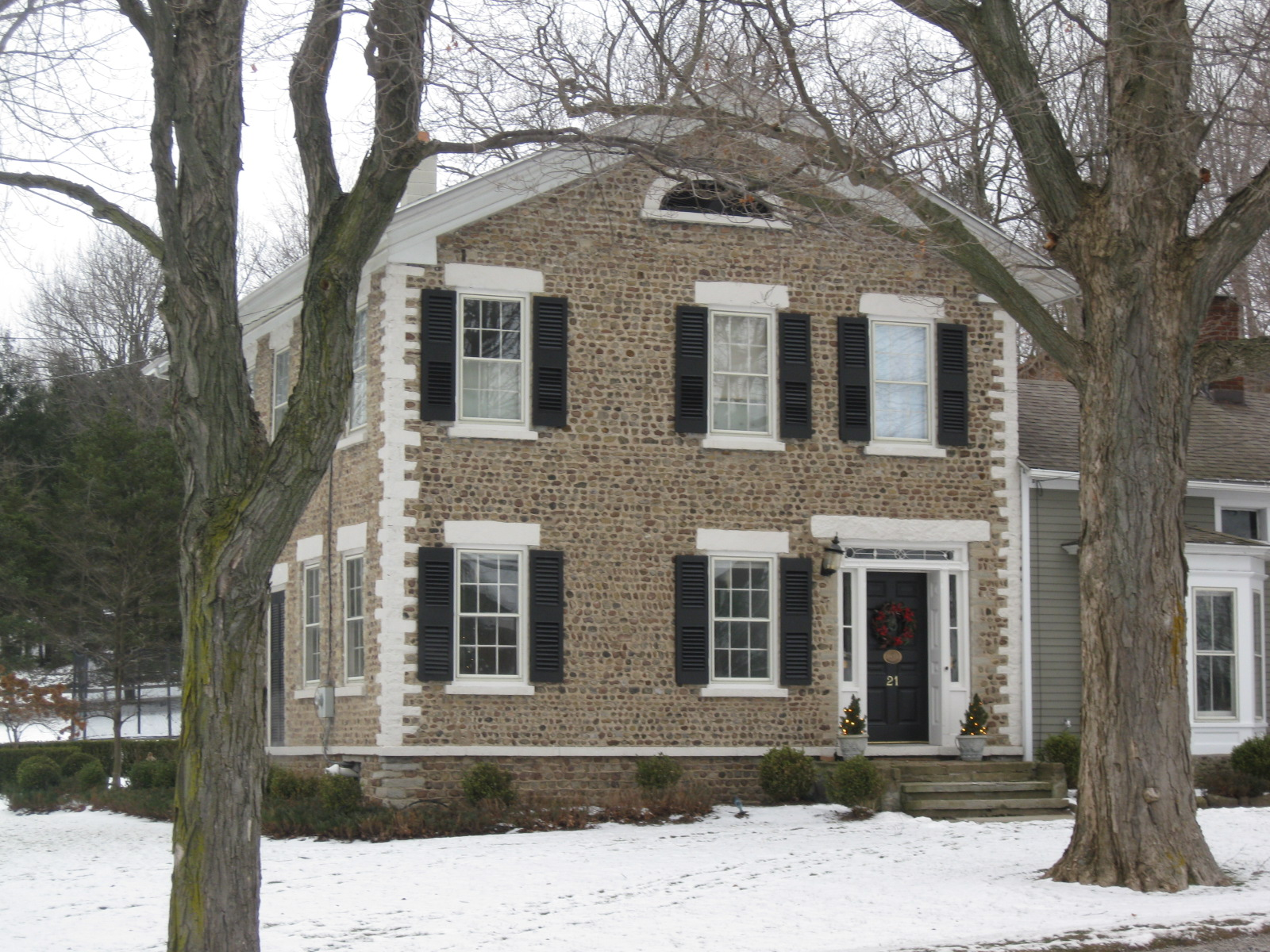
- Sheldon Cobblestone House, December 2009

- Location within New York Location within the United States
- Location: 21 Mendon-Ionia Rd., NY 251, Mendon, New York
- Coordinates: 42°59′49″N 77°30′16″W
- Area: 1.9 acres (0.77 ha)
- Built: 1833
- Architectural style: Federal
- MPS: Cobblestone Architecture of New York State MPS
- NRHP reference No.: 96001392
- Added to NRHP: November 29, 1996

Sheldon Cobblestone House is a historic home located at Mendon in Monroe County, New York. It is a Federal style cobblestone farmhouse built about 1833. It is constructed of medium-sized field cobbles and is one of only 10 surviving cobblestone buildings in Mendon.

It was listed on the National Register of Historic Places in 1996.
