= Cole Cobblestone Farmhouse =

Historic building in New York, United States

- U.S. National Register of Historic Places
- New York State Register of Historic Places
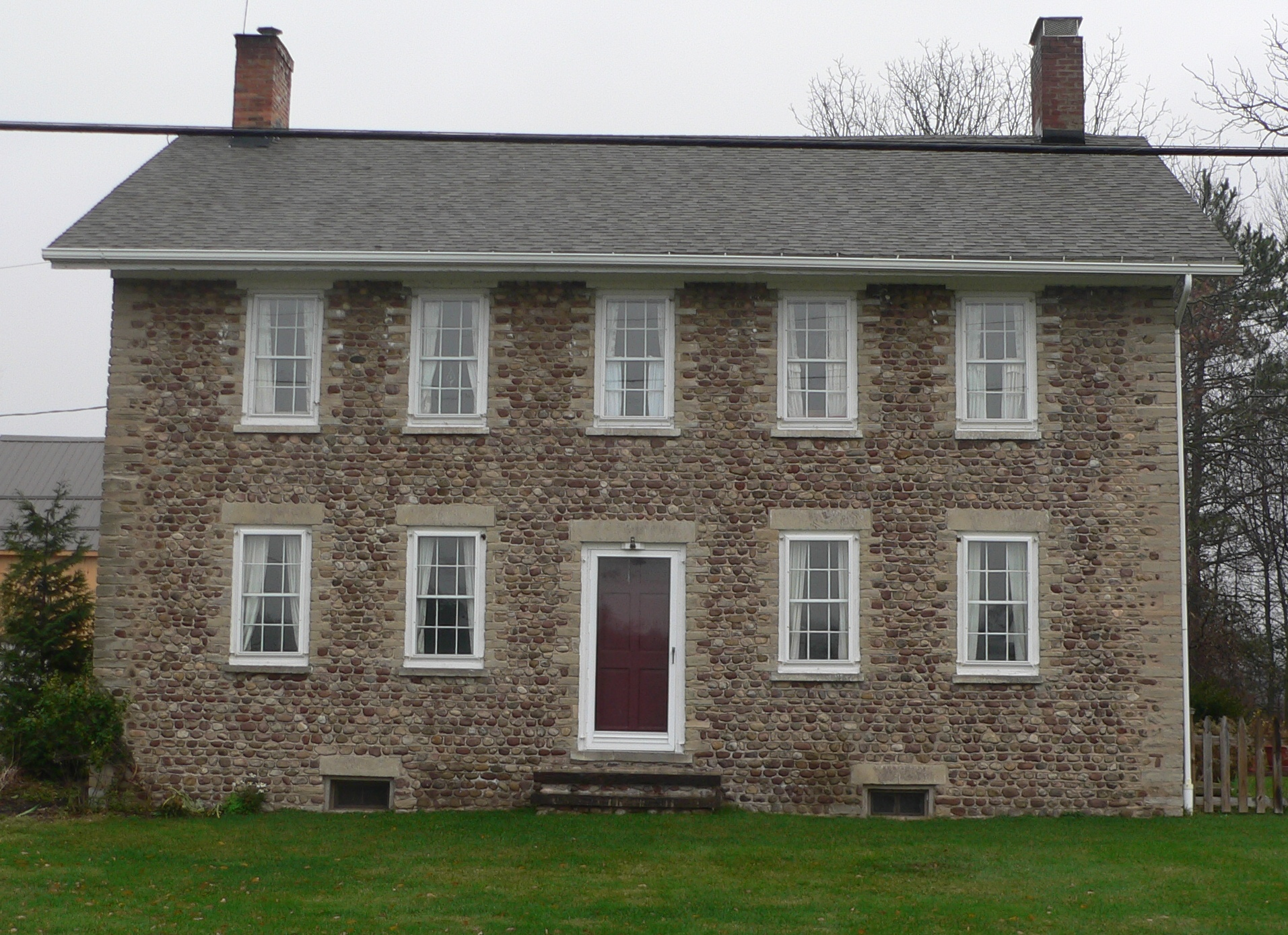
- Cole Cobblestone Farmhouse, seen from across Mile Square Road

- Location within New York Location within the United States
- Location: 933 Mile Square Rd., Mendon, New York
- Coordinates: 43°0′52″N 77°29′47″W
- Area: 2.6 acres (1.1 ha)
- Built: 1832
- Architectural style: Federal
- MPS: Cobblestone Architecture of New York State MPS
- NRHP reference No.: 96001394
- NYSRHP No.: 05509.000033

Significant dates
- Added to NRHP: November 29, 1996
- Designated NYSRHP: October 16, 1996

Cole Cobblestone Farmhouse is a historic home located at Mendon in Monroe County, New York. It is a Federal style cobblestone farmhouse built about 1832. It is constructed of medium-sized field cobbles and is one of only 10 surviving cobblestone buildings in Mendon.

It was listed on the National Register of Historic Places in 1996.
