= Stewart Cobblestone Farmhouse =

Historic house in New York, United States

- U.S. National Register of Historic Places
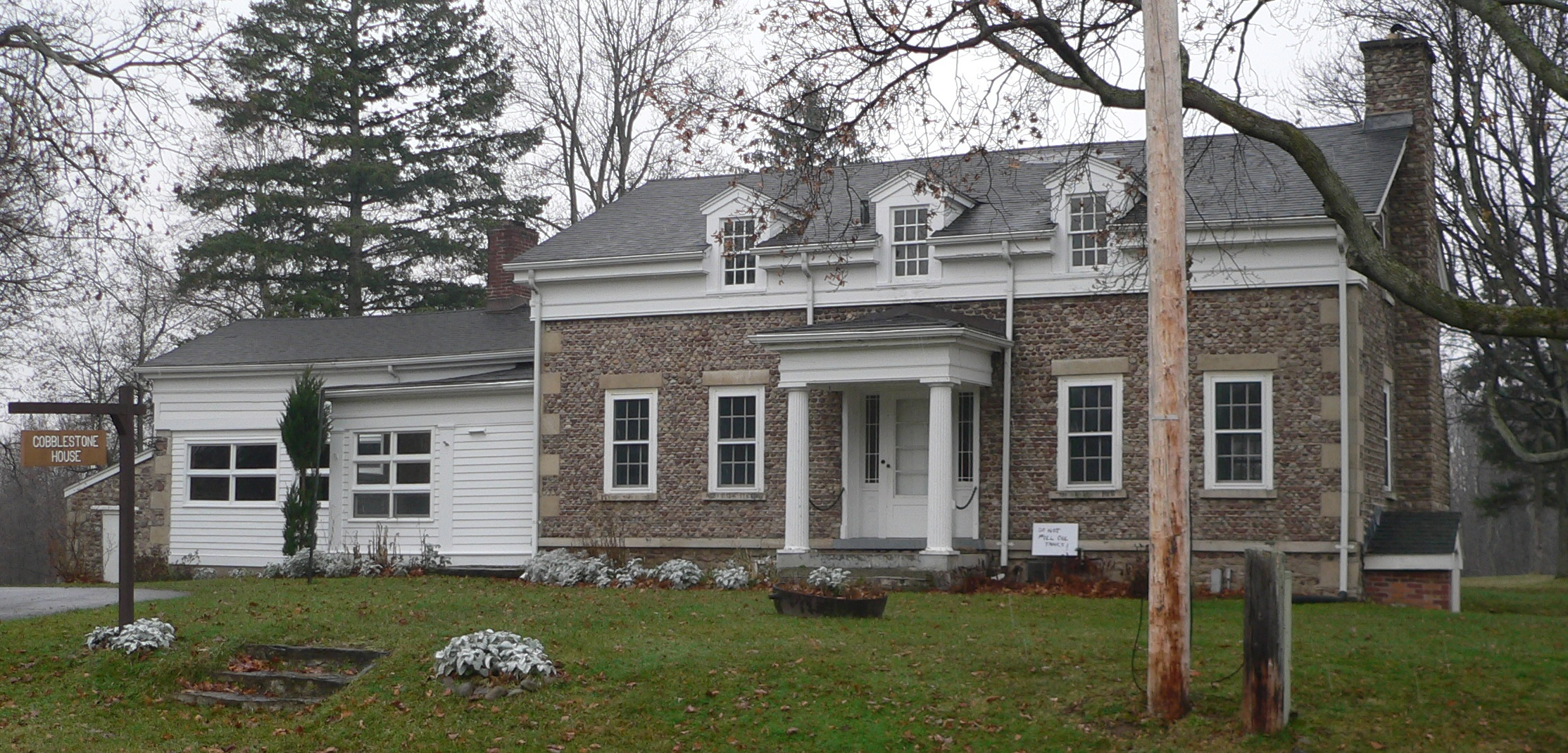
- View from the east, across Douglas Road

- Location within New York Location within the United States
- Location: Douglas Rd., S of jct. with Canfield Rd., Mendon, New York
- Coordinates: 43°1′57″N 77°33′23″W
- Area: less than one acre
- Built: 1835
- Architectural style: Greek Revival
- MPS: Cobblestone Architecture of New York State MPS
- NRHP reference No.: 96001391
- Added to NRHP: March 4, 1997

Stewart Cobblestone Farmhouse is a historic home located at Mendon in Monroe County, New York. It is a vernacular Greek Revival style cobblestone farmhouse built about 1835. It is constructed of medium-sized field cobbles and is one of only 10 surviving cobblestone buildings in Mendon. The house features a Colonial Revival style portico added in the 20th century.

It was listed on the National Register of Historic Places in 1997.
