= Whitcomb Cobblestone Farmhouse =

Historic house in New York, United States

- U.S. National Register of Historic Places
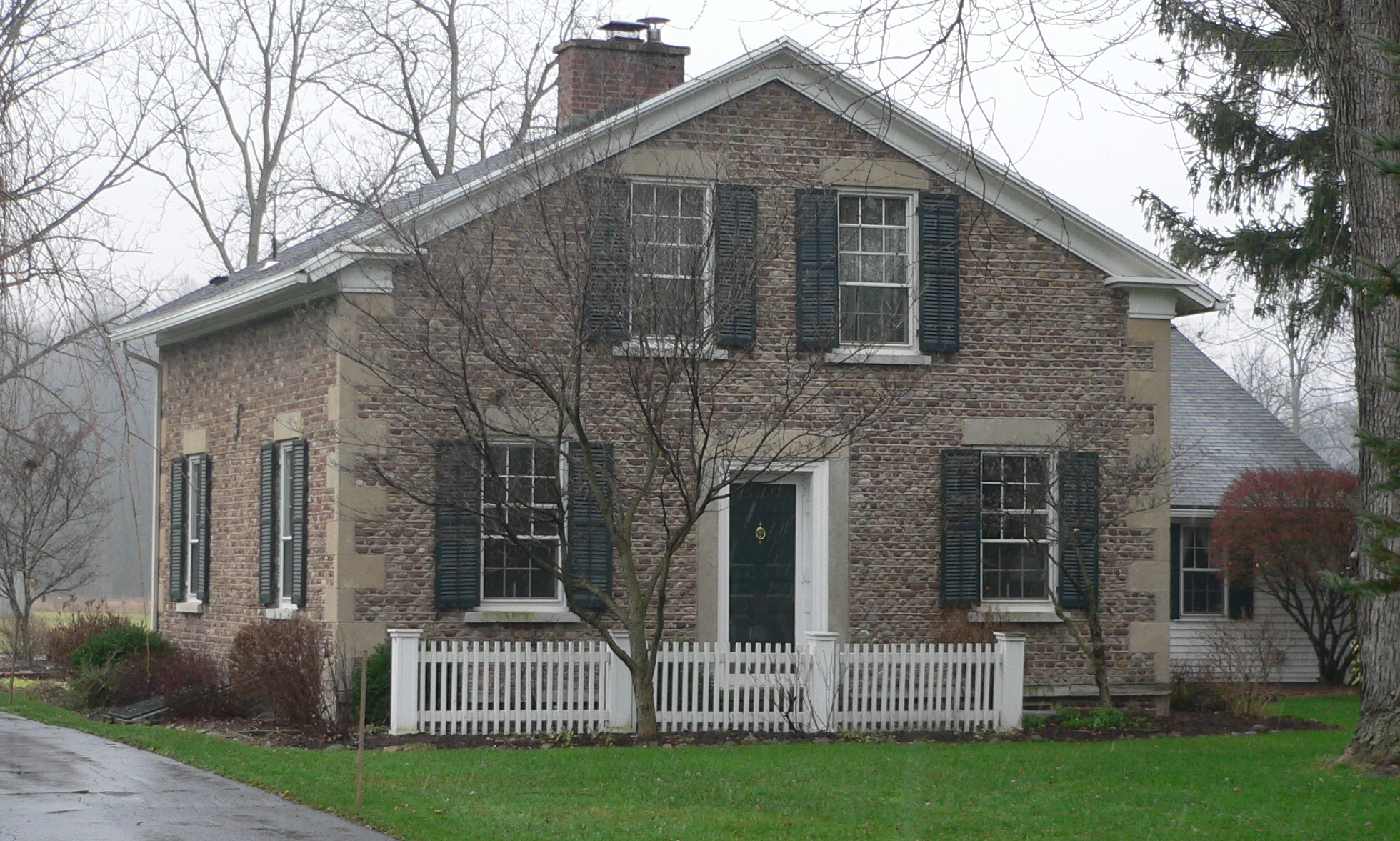
- View from the northeast

- Location within New York Location within the United States
- Interactive map showing the location of Whitcomb Cobblestone Farmhouse
- Location: 437 Pond Rd., Mendon, New York
- Coordinates: 43°0′24″N 77°31′58″W
- Area: 19 acres (7.7 ha)
- Built: 1847
- Architectural style: Greek Revival
- MPS: Cobblestone Architecture of New York State MPS
- NRHP reference No.: 96001396
- Added to NRHP: November 29, 1996

Whitcomb Cobblestone Farmhouse is a historic home located at Mendon in Monroe County, New York. It is a vernacular Greek Revival style cobblestone farmhouse built about 1847. It is constructed of medium-sized field cobbles and is one of only 10 surviving cobblestone buildings in Mendon.

It was listed on the National Register of Historic Places in 1996.
