= Mendon Cobblestone Academy =

- U.S. National Register of Historic Places
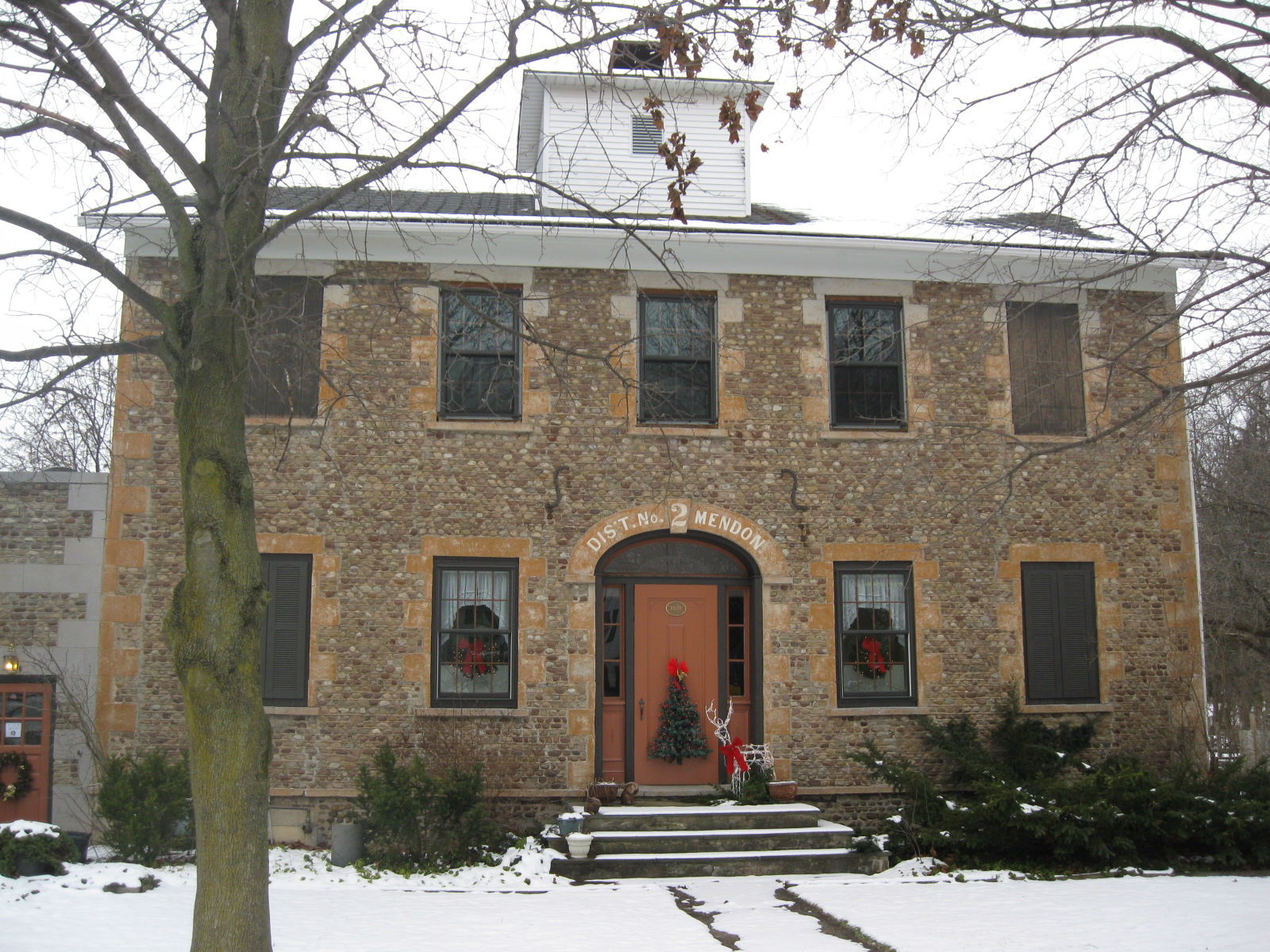
- Mendon Cobblestone Academy, December 2009

- Location within New York Location within the United States
- Location: 16 Mendon--Ionia Rd., Mendon, New York
- Coordinates: 42°59′48″N 77°30′18″W
- Area: 0.6 acres (0.24 ha)
- Built: 1835
- Architectural style: Federal
- MPS: Cobblestone Architecture of New York State MPS
- NRHP reference No.: 96001395
- Added to NRHP: November 29, 1996

Mendon Cobblestone Academy is a historic school located at Mendon in Monroe County, New York. It is a Federal style cobblestone structure built about 1835. It is constructed of medium-sized field cobbles and is one of only 10 surviving cobblestone buildings in Mendon. The building was used as a school for about a century. It was acquired in 1950 by the Mendon Fire Department and remodelled for use as a firehouse.

It was listed on the National Register of Historic Places in 1996.
