= Mendon, New York =

- Town
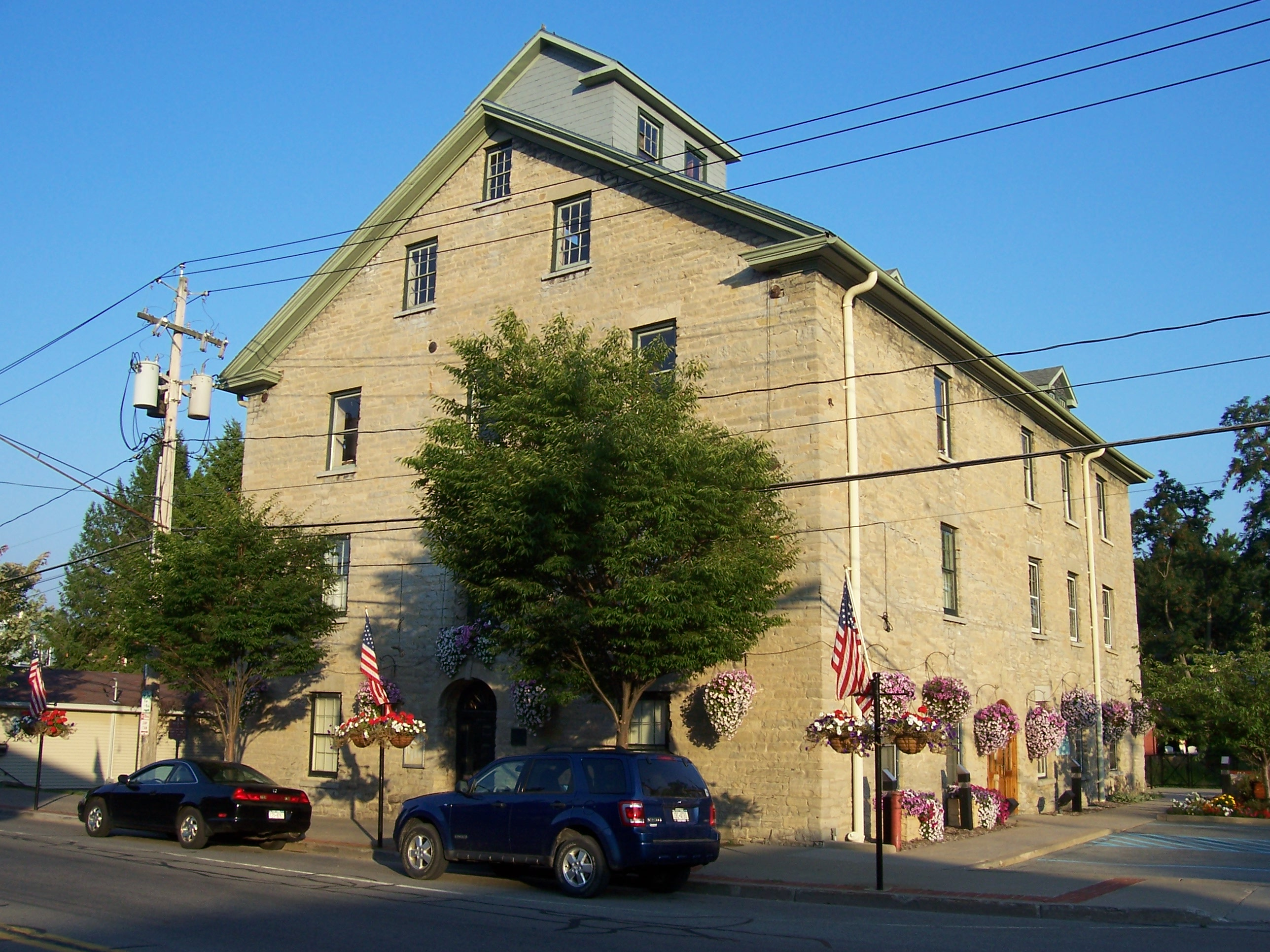
- Mendon Town Hall
- Motto(s): "Preserving, protecting, promoting"
- Location in Monroe County and the state of New York

- Location of New York in the United States
- Coordinates: 42°59′52″N 77°30′16″W
- Country: United States
- State: New York
- County: Monroe
- Established: May 26, 1812; 214 years ago

Government
  - Town supervisor: John D. Moffitt (R) First elected 2009 Town council: Cynthia M. Carroll (R); Thomas G. Dubois (R); Karen R. Jenkins (R); Brent Rosiek (R)

Area
  - Total: 39.98 sq mi (103.56 km^{2})
  - Land: 39.47 sq mi (102.23 km^{2})
  - Water: 0.51 sq mi (1.33 km^{2})
- Elevation: 561 ft (171 m)

Population (2020)
  - Total: 9,095
  - Density: 230.4/sq mi (89.0/km^{2})
- Time zone: UTC-5 (EST)
  - Summer (DST): UTC-4 (EDT)
- ZIP Codes: 14472 (Honeoye Falls); 14506 (Mendon); 14467 (Henrietta); 14534 (Pittsford)
- Area code: 585
- FIPS code: 36-055-46558
- Website: townofmendonny.gov

Mendon is a town in Monroe County, New York, United States. It has been ranked as the most affluent suburb of the city of Rochester. As of the 2020 census, the population was 9,095. The town is on the southern border of the county.

== History ==
The earliest known inhabitants of the land where the town of Mendon is located were the Seneca people of the Iroquois Confederacy. Totiakton, the native settlement in present-day Mendon, was home to about 4,000 people. In 1687, the town was destroyed by the Marquis de Denonville, the governor of New France, during his expedition against the Seneca. Shortly after the destruction, the surviving natives moved elsewhere. The rest of the Seneca suffered a similar fate when, in 1779, Major General John Sullivan was ordered by George Washington to wage war against Loyalists and four nations of the Iroquois Confederacy who had sided with the British in the Revolutionary War. The Sullivan Expedition pushed the tribes to the British-controlled Niagara Frontier, the western edge of New York.

Following the Revolutionary War, in 1788 Oliver Phelps and Nathaniel Gorham bought 6,000,000 acres (24,000 km^{2}) of land in what is now western New York from the Commonwealth of Massachusetts. Included in the Phelps and Gorham Purchase was the land that would later become the town of Mendon (known as Township Number 11, Range 5 in the purchase's 1788 survey).

For a short period, the area that is now Mendon was ostensibly part of New York's Montgomery County until January 27, 1789, when Ontario County was formed. From 1789 to 1812, the area was within the town of Bloomfield. On May 26, 1812, the town of Mendon separated from Bloomfield, holding its first town meeting and elections on April 6, 1813. In 1821, Mendon was annexed by Monroe County when the county was created.

According to a local historian, Mendon most likely got its name from Caleb Taft, an early settler, who came from Mendon, Massachusetts.

On June 7, 1825, the Marquis de Lafayette was escorted from the village of Rochesterville to the hamlet of Mendon where he was met by representatives from the village of Canandaigua during his tour of all 24 states of the union.

The first train travelled through Mendon on January 1, 1853, when a railroad was built between Canandaigua and Batavia. The "Peanut Line", as it would later be referred to after it was acquired by the New York Central Railroad, was opened and had a station in the village of Honeoye Falls. In 1891, the Lehigh Valley Railroad (LVRR) completed its mainline from Manchester to Buffalo, which travelled right through the heart of Mendon. At the height of the LVRR, there were three stations located in the town; one in the hamlet of Mendon, the second at Rochester Junction (a major hub where track split off the mainline to downtown Rochester), and the third in the village of Honeoye Falls.

In 1954, the New York State Thruway was built on the northern border of Mendon, which became Interstate 90 when the Interstate Highway System was created in 1957.

The Adsit Cobblestone Farmhouse, Cole Cobblestone Farmhouse, Gates-Livermore Cobblestone Farmhouse, Mendon Cobblestone Academy, Mendon Presbyterian Church, Miller–Horton–Barben Farm, Sheldon Cobblestone House, Stewart Cobblestone Farmhouse, and Whitcomb Cobblestone Farmhouse are listed on the National Register of Historic Places.

== Geography ==
Mendon is in southeastern Monroe County at 42°59′52″N 77°30′16″W. Mendon Center is about 13 miles (21 km) south of Rochester.

The town is bordered on the north by the town of Pittsford, on the west by the towns of Henrietta and Rush, on the south by the town of Lima in Livingston County and the town of West Bloomfield in Ontario County, and on the east by the town of Victor in Ontario County. The town is made up mostly of horse farms and family homes.

According to the U.S. Census Bureau, the town has a total area of 40.0 square miles (104 km^{2}), of which 39.5 square miles (102 km^{2}) are land and 0.5 square miles (1.3 km^{2}), or 1.29%, are water. Honeoye Creek flows through the southwestern part of the town, including through the village of Honeoye Falls. The creek is a part of the Genesee River watershed. Irondequoit Creek flows through the southeastern part of the town, and the majority of the town is part of its watershed. The highest elevation in Monroe County is just inside the southeast corner of Mendon, at 1,028 feet (313 m) above sea level, within the Hopper Hills.

Mendon Ponds Park, the largest in Monroe County, is a 2,462-acre (996 ha) property in the northwest part of the town, containing woodlands, ponds, wetlands. The park became a National Natural Landmark in November 1967 for its unique glacial features.

In the southern part of the town, hills and a meandering creek were used to create the Mendon Golf Club. The first nine holes were designed by Peter Craig in 1961, and the back nine, added in 1967, were designed by Joe DeMino. The 2016 NCAA Division III men's golf championship was played at the club and was hosted by St. John Fisher College.

== Demographics ==
Historical population
Census	Pop.	Note	%±
1820	2,012		—
1830	3,057		51.9%
1840	3,435		12.4%
1850	3,353		−2.4%
1860	2,936		−12.4%
1870	2,900		−1.2%
1880	3,193		10.1%
1890	2,991		−6.3%
1900	2,769		−7.4%
1910	2,754		−0.5%
1920	2,509		−8.9%
1930	2,636		5.1%
1940	2,700		2.4%
1950	2,903		7.5%
1960	3,902		34.4%
1970	4,541		16.4%
1980	5,434		19.7%
1990	6,845		26.0%
2000	8,370		22.3%
2010	9,152		9.3%
2020	9,095		−0.6%
U.S. Decennial Census

As of the 2010 United States census, there were 9,152 people, 3,457 households, and 2,590 families residing in the town. The population density was 236.3 inhabitants per square mile (91.2/km^{2}). There were 3,138 housing units at an average density of 78.8 per square mile (30.4/km^{2}). The racial makeup of the town was 96.5% White, 0.5% African American, 0.2% Native American, 1.5% Asian, 0.3% from other races, and 1.0% from two or more races. Hispanic or Latino of any race were 1.7% of the population.

There were 3,457 households, out of which 36.8% had children under the age of 18 living with them, 64.9% were married couples living together, 7.0% had a female householder with no husband present, and 25.1% were non-families. 21.0% of all households were made up of individuals, and 24.1% had someone living alone who was 65 years of age or older. The average household size was 2.64 and the average family size was 3.10.

In the town, the population was spread out, with 27.5% under the age of 18, 5.5% from 18 to 24, 19.4% from 25 to 44, 34.9% from 45 to 64, and 12.7% who were 65 years of age or older. The median age was 43.6 years. For every 100 females, there were 96.9 males. For every 100 females age 18 and over, there were 93.3 males.

The 2017 American Community Survey estimated the median income for a household in the town to be $97,902, and the median income for a family to be $114,063. The per capita income estimate for the town was $53,046. An estimated 6.0% of families and 7.9% of the population were below the poverty line, including 11.4% of those under age 18 and 7.8% of those age 65 or over.

== Communities and locations in the town of Mendon ==
- Dann Corner – Located at the junction of Route 15A and Honeoye Falls No 6 Road just west of the village of Honeoye Falls
- Ford Corner – Located at the junction of West Bloomfield Road and Cheese Factory Road
- Honeoye Falls – A village in the southwest part of the town on Honeoye Creek.
- Mendon – A hamlet in the eastern part of the town at the junction of Routes 64 and 251.
- Mendon Center – Located at the junction of Route 251 and Mendon Center Road, near the southeast corner of Mendon Ponds Park
- Mendon Ponds Park – A large county park and National Natural Landmark
- Moran Corner – Located at the junction of Route 15A and Monroe Street just northwest of the village of Honeoye Falls
- Rochester Junction – Located at the junction of routes 251 and 65
- Sibleyville – Located at the junction of Route 15A and Sibley Road. The Hiram Sibley Homestead was listed on the National Register of Historic Places in 1985.
- Tomlinson Corners – Located near the junction of Route 64 and Boughton Hill Road

== Government ==
In New York state, towns are organized with an elective legislative body known as a town board. Town government is run by the town board, members of which act as the executive, administrative and legislative body of the town. A town board, as a group, is the executive head of the town, there being no true executive in town government comparable with a mayor of a city or village, or with the governor of the state. While the supervisor presides at town board meetings and may be assigned certain powers of administration and supervision, the additional duties and responsibilities of the supervisor are only those which result from that position's statutory role as town treasurer.

Prior to 1964, authority for town board action had to be in specific state legislation or in the constitution. Since that date, however, towns have had constitutional home rule powers. Towns are able to enact local laws regarding subjects within the realm of "property, affairs and government" of the town, provided the laws are not inconsistent with the constitution or a law of general statewide applicability enacted by the State Legislature. In addition, towns may adopt local laws concerning a number of other subjects specified in the constitution and the Municipal Home Rule Law, so long as they are not inconsistent with general law applicable to all towns, and provided there is no statutory restriction against such local law. Since 1974, with certain exceptions, towns may even supersede some provisions of town law regardless of their general applicability. Besides the above-described legislative powers, town law and other state statutes contain authority for town boards to act in a variety of specific areas. These have been amended over the years such that town boards have the authority to supply almost every public function or service that any other municipality may provide, subject to the functions specific rules and procedures.

In Mendon, the town board consists of a supervisor and four town board members (often referred to in statutes as councilpersons). Town board members, as elected officials of the town, must be "electors" of the town at the time of election and throughout their terms of office. An elector is someone who could register as a voter in the town, whether they actually have or not. Registration has three components: residency, age and citizenship. Residency equates to the legal term "domicile" and is defined in law. The age qualification is 18 and United States citizenship is also required. Mendon town board members have a term of four years. The Mendon town supervisor has a term of two years. Town elections are held in odd-numbered years, with new terms starting the following January 1.

The town board, as the executive body of the town, acts as a unit and must function as a body. An individual board member may not unilaterally act on behalf of the town board. No town board member has more or less authority than any other board member. Therefore, no board member can legally act independently for the others or outside the board. No single member of the town board can act for or commit the noard as a body to any particular program or policy.

The town board may, by resolution, delegate to the supervisor the powers and duties of administration and supervision of town special improvement district functions to be performed on behalf of the town board. The purpose of this provision is to allow the town to function between town board meetings. This delegation does not allow the town board to abdicate to the supervisor or surrender to him or her the board's basic statutory responsibilities.

The paper of record for the town of Mendon is the Mendon-Honeoye Falls-Lima Sentinel.

== Emergency response ==
Access to emergency services is obtained by dialing 911, which connects the caller to the city of Rochester's emergency communications department (911 center). The Monroe County sheriff's department provides primary law enforcement for the town.

The Mendon Volunteer Fire Department provides fire protection, rescue, and non-transport emergency medical services for the town. The Honeoye Falls Volunteer Fire Department provides additional services in the areas in and surrounding the village of Honeoye Falls.

The Honeoye Falls Mendon Volunteer Ambulance provides both basic and advanced life support with trained emergency medical technicians.

== Education ==
Mendon is served primarily by the Honeoye Falls-Lima Central School District, while the northernmost portion of the town is part of the Pittsford Central School District.

== Notable people ==
- David Francis Barry, 19th-century photographer of the American West
- Adolphus W. Burtt, attorney and politician
- Truddi Chase, author of When Rabbit Howls; childhood sexual abuse survivor
- Bill English, actor
- R. Thomas Flynn, former president of Monroe Community College
- Mary Therese Friel, Miss New York USA 1979 and Miss USA 1979
- Quinn Gleason, tennis player
- Charles A. Goheen, Medal of Honor recipient for the American Civil War; buried in Honeoye Falls
- Tom Golisano, founder of Paychex
- Heber C. Kimball, early LDS Church leader
- Helen Mar Kimball, one of Joseph Smith's wives
- William Henry Kimball, early LDS Church leader
- Warren Parrish, early LDS Church Leader
- Andrew Rea, YouTuber and author known for the YouTube channel Babish Culinary Universe
- Marty Reasoner, NHL hockey player
- Hiram Sibley, co-founder and president of Western Union
- John Williams, equestrian
- Brigham Young, early LDS Church leader whose first wife, Miriam Works Young, died and is buried at Tomlinson's Corners Cemetery in Mendon
