= Cobblestone architecture =

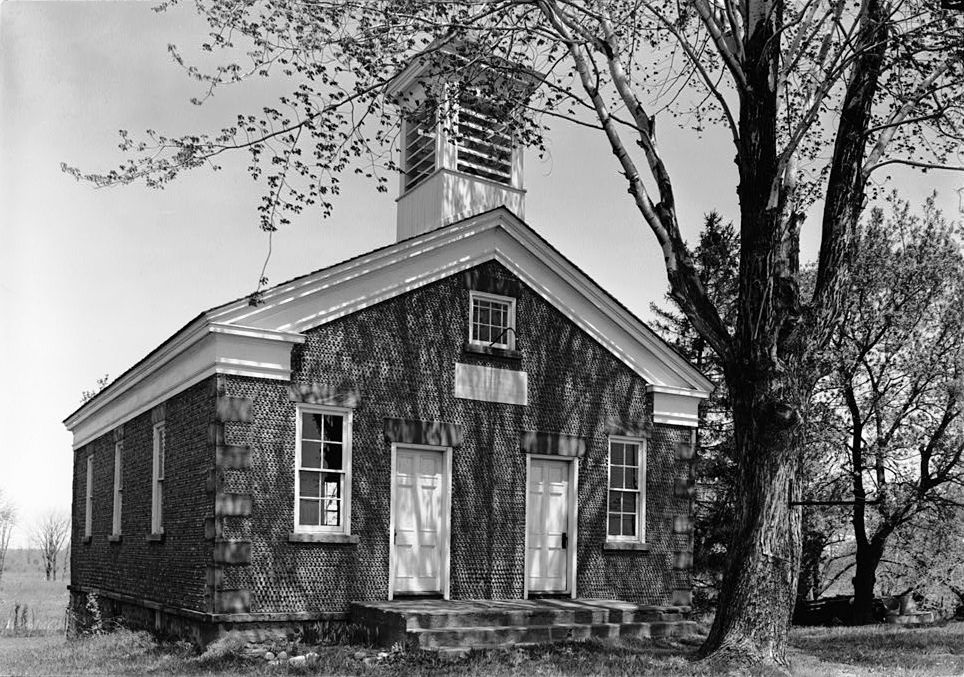
The Cobblestone Schoolhouse is part of the Cobblestone Historic District, in the hamlet of Childs, New York.

Cobblestone architecture refers to the use of cobblestones embedded in mortar as method for erecting walls on houses and commercial buildings. It was frequently used in the northeastern United States and upper Midwest in the early 19th century; the greatest concentration of surviving cobblestone buildings is in New York State, generally near the historic Erie Canal or connecting canals.

== History ==
Evidence of the use of cobblestones in building has been found in the ruins of Hierakonpolis in Egypt. Houses were built of mud brick set on cobblestone foundations. Cobblestone architecture may have been used on a monumental scale to erect public administrative centers or palaces. Those structures have since collapsed into mounds of stone.

Cobbles, mostly flint, became a common building material from the Middle Ages onwards in England and a few parts of Northern Europe where they are easily found; this is usually known as "flint architecture" in England. Flushwork is a term for decorative patterns in flint and stone, usually including split stones for contrasting colour on the outer surface of the wall, while the unseen core consists of unsplit cobbles. Other areas have unsplit cobbles on the outside of the wall, sometimes carefully graded and arranged for a decorative effect.

Cobblestone architecture was used in the northeastern United States, especially antebellum Western New York, Central New York, and the northern Finger Lakes. Masons who built the Erie Canal during 1817-1825 started building cobblestone structures about the time the canal was finished. The stones used in the construction were typically of a rounded shape; they had been deposited in the area by glaciers, and cleared from the fields by early farmers, or brought from the shores of Lake Ontario. Migrants from New York carried the style west to Ohio, Illinois, Michigan and Wisconsin. Historians estimate that at least 75 percent, and possibly more than 90 percent, of American cobblestone buildings can be found within 70–75 miles of Rochester, New York. The style was prominent between 1835 and about 1860; around 900 cobblestone buildings were constructed in New York state before the American Civil War. After the war, construction slowed; there were only two post-Civil War cobblestone structures known by author Noble. About 700 cobblestone homes remain in the Rochester area.

The Town Hall in Westport, Connecticut, built in 1908, is unusual for including a cobblestone exterior surface within a Classical Revival style design.

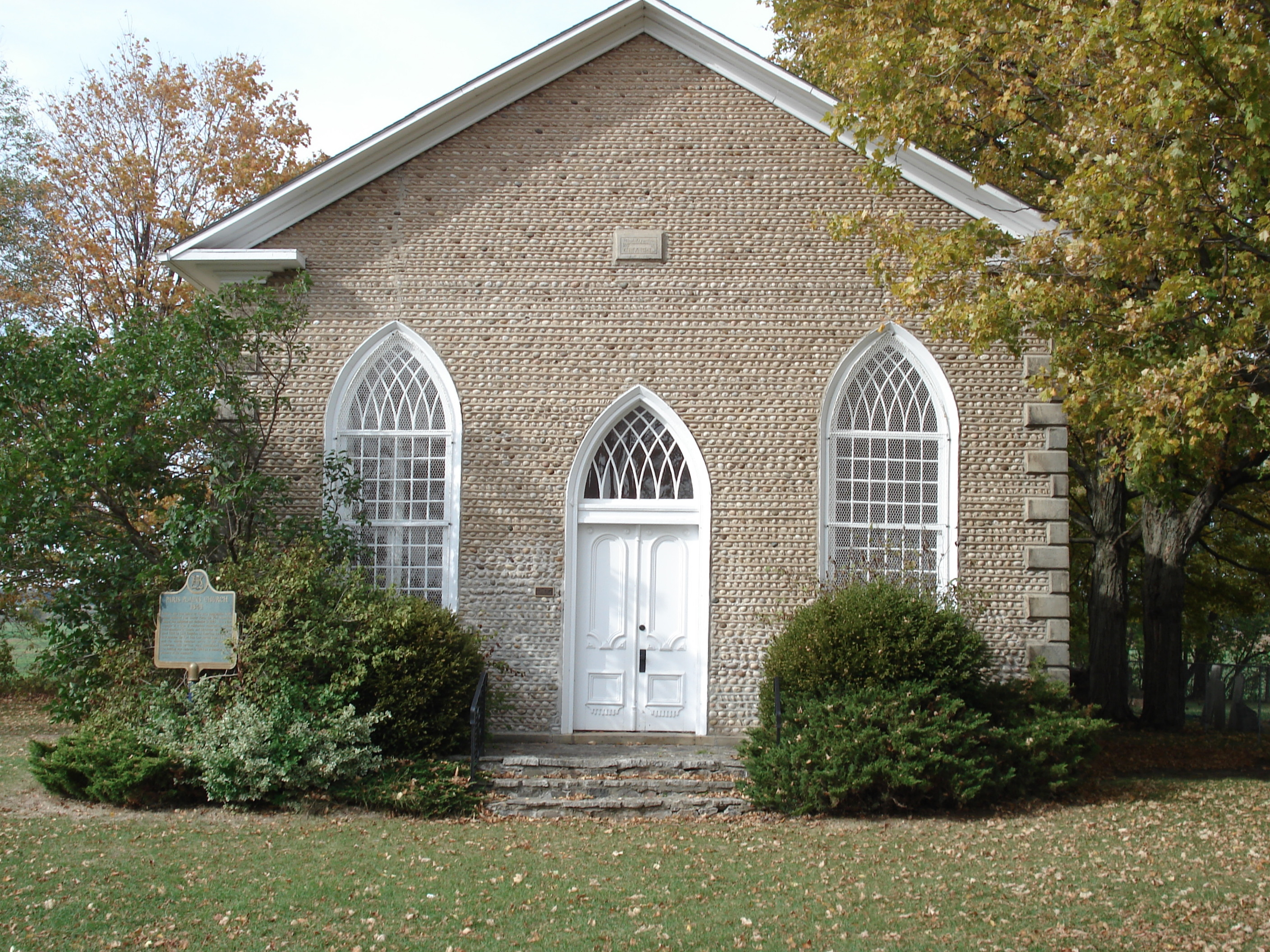
Paris Plains Church, Paris, Ontario, 1845, cobblestone architecture

Paris, Ontario is referred to as "the cobblestone capital of Canada" due to a significant number of cobblestone buildings. This mode of construction was introduced to the community when Levi Boughton (d.1895), a New York mason, arrived in 1838.

== Construction method and style ==
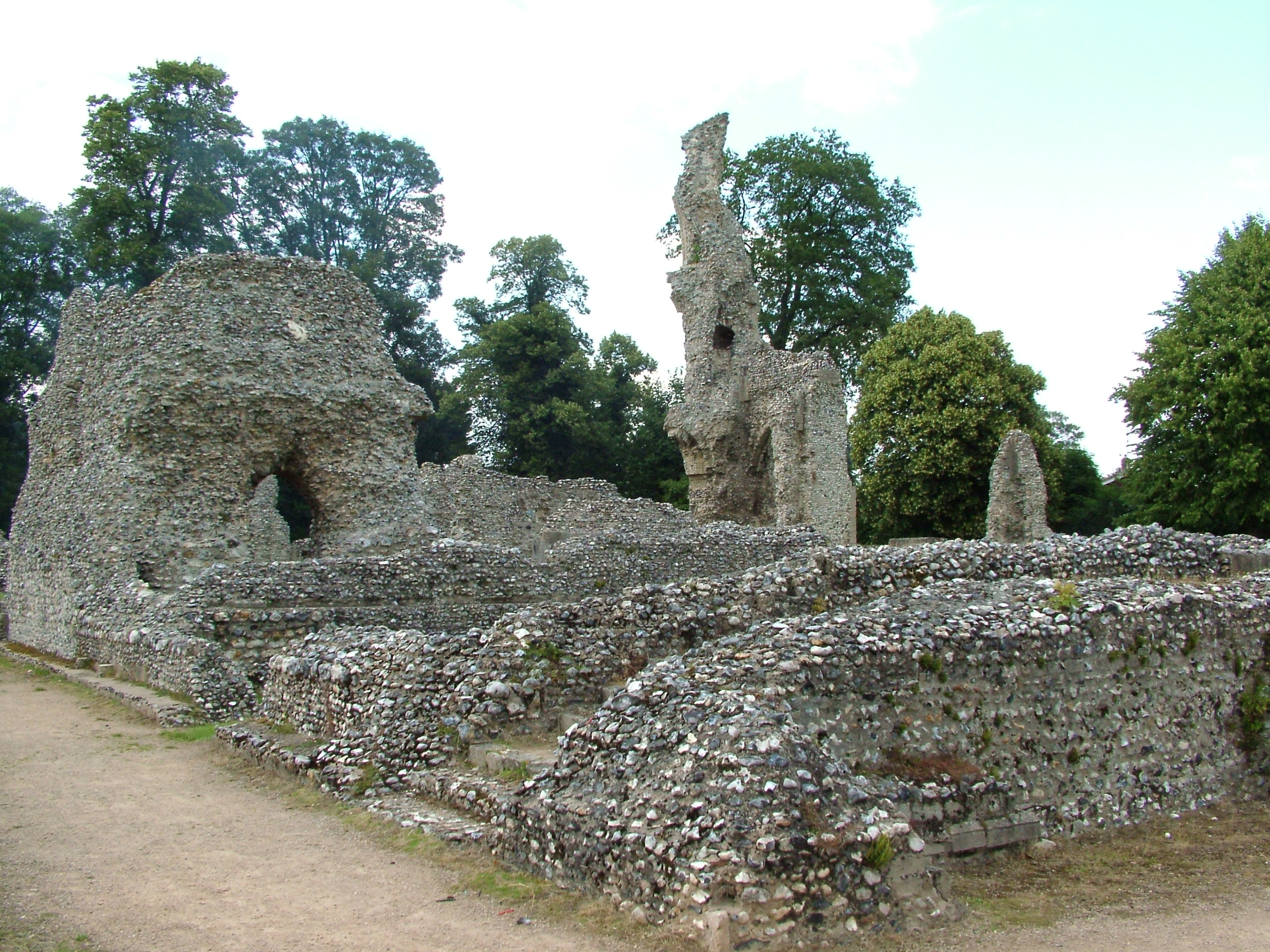
The ruins of the medieval Thetford Priory in England show flint cobbles and mortar through the whole depth of the wall

In true cobblestone architecture, the whole wall consists of rows of cobblestones embedded in a lime mortar. The exterior surface may be carefully constructed for decorative effect, with cobbles matched in size and color. In Wisconsin most cobblestone buildings seem to have only the exterior surfaces made of cobblestone, as a decorative finish over a rubble core.

English medieval walls often contain a mixture of cobbles, rubble and re-used brick, though the picture from Thetford shows almost exclusively cobbles. Some cobblestone architecture shows consistent matching in the size of the stones used, shape, and color. This method of construction has been referred to as a form of folk art. Cobblestone architecture is featured in many houses and farmhouses but also in churches, stores and town halls.

== See also ==
- List of cobblestone buildings
- List of cobblestone streets
