= Newman-Cotter House =

Historic site in Monroe County, New York, USA

Coordinates: 43.101768°N 77.447996°W

The Newman-Cotter House is located in Monroe County, New York at 112 West Avenue, Fairport, New York.

== History ==
The Newman-Cotter House was built sometime in the 1870s by William M. Newman when "A boom in the economy during the time this style was popular resulted in many structures built in the Queen Anne style" (Garvin 2002). In 2013, the Perinton Historic Preservation Commission designated the home a landmark. It was thought to be constructed as a Stick style home, but later (sometime after 1887), remodelled to a Queen Anne architectural style. James H. Cotter purchased the home in 1906, moving his family into the 2,345 Sq Ft house.

== The Newman-Cotter House Caretaker ==
The Cotter-Phillips family lived in the house until the death of Marie C. Phillips, the 96-year-old daughter of James H. Cotter. The Cotters were the longest running owners due in part to Frederick J. Phillips (Ted), (Marie C. Phillips Son) whom attended to the business and personal matters of his Mother and the Newman-Cotter House. Ted graduated from Fairport High School and attended The Rochester Business Institute (RBI) lettering in Football, Basketball, and Baseball. Soon after graduation, Ted began working for the U.S. Postal Service as a letter carrier, however, in 1942, he volunteered and enlisted into the United States Army as an Infantryman. He was deployed to the European Theatre of Operation. Due to the shortage of military postal personnel and his prior experience, he was transferred to the Adjutant Generals Corp. During his 22-month tour in Europe, Ted was decorated in the Ardennes and Rhineland Campaigns. His exemplary performance resulted in the U.S. Army awarding him a Battle Field Commission to Second Lieutenant. After the war, Ted reunited with his wife Lillian Phillips("Lill") and his two-year-old daughter Sharon ("Shari") at the Newman-Cotter House. Ted returned to his position at the U.S. Postal Service, and at a young age, was appointed Postmaster of Perinton and Fairport N.Y. on April 1, 1946.

== Other Fairport NY Landmarks in 2013 ==
In 2013, there were 3 other structures besides the Newman-Cotter House that were designated as historic landmarks by the Fairport Historic Preservation Commission (FHPC). The following are the names, locations, and dates that the structures were recognized and designated:

1. The Pure Oil Building - 99 South Main Street, Fairport, NY (1/3/2013).
2. The Kellogg House - 126 West Avenue, Fairport, NY (1/3/2013).
3. Rochester Telephone Building - 56 West Avenue, Fairport, NY (11/7/2013).

During the Great Depression, the owners of the Green Lantern Inn (The Henry DeLand House), who ran a speakeasy loft During the Prohibition of alcohol, leased their land to the Pure Oil Company which built a small white building that functioned as a gas station until 1961.

The design of the building resembled an English cottage which was the company's standard design style starting in 1927. It featured details such as white brick, a rounded doorway, and a gloss blue Ludowici tile roof. After 1961, the building was utilized for many other business types. If you spoke to the residents of Fairport that grew up in that era, they would likely say the Slocum Insurance Agency was the most well-known business that occupied the Pure Oil Building.

In close proximity to the Newman-Cotter House was The Kellogg House located at 126 West Avenue, Fairport, NY. The house was built in 1911 in the Georgian Revival style and resembled a cross between a residence and a commercial building with its long frontal pillars and trade mark architecture. The house was built by an American Can Company executive, Gordon H. Kellogg, who grew up in Fairport, attended Fairport Schools, and subsequently studied at Colgate University. He had a long history with the American Can Company, retiring in 1950. Of notable importance, the American Can Company held government contracts during WWII to manufacture tin products that were used for the troops and the war effort.

The Rochester Telephone Exchange Building is located on 56 West Avenue, Fairport, NY. It was built in 1929 due to the modern economic growth that was occurring in Fairport at that time. The Rochester Telephone Exchange Building was constructed of red brick and was characterized by a flat roof and simple lines that were indicative of the commercial Prairie Style structures. The building was equipped with new switchboards and a central power system that utilized batteries. Operations began on March 5, 1930, with 12 operators. As with many small towns in upstate New York, many residents living in the community would work locally, such was the case at The Rochester Telephone Company in Fairport. One of the operators, Lillian Phillips, can be linked to the Newman-Cotter House as she was the devoted wife of Ted Phillips.

== Notes ==
- Garvin, A., & Garvin, A. (2002). The American city: What works, what doesn't. New York, New York;: McGraw-Hill.
