= Fairport High School =

High school in New York, USA

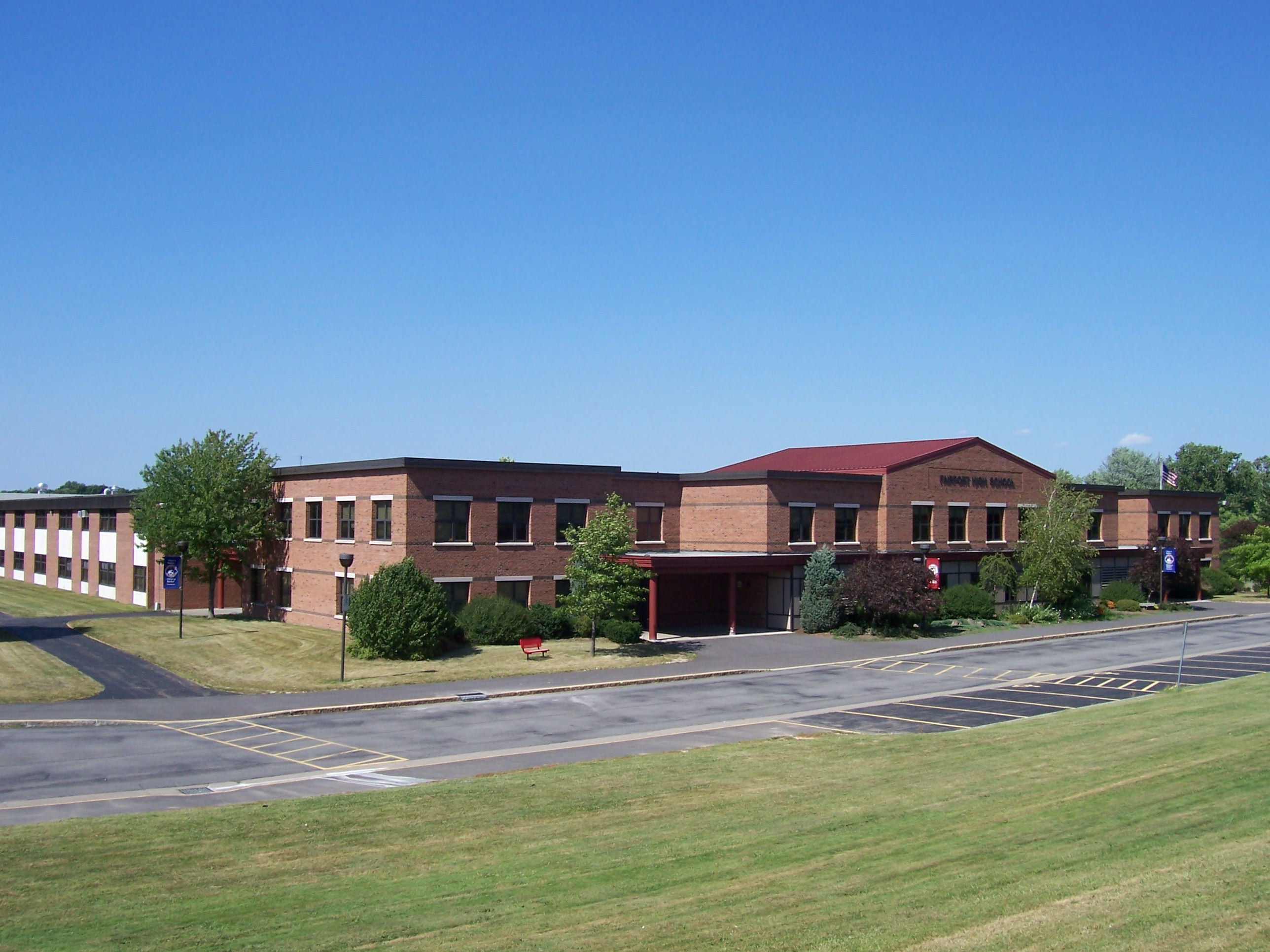

Location
- 1 Dave Paddock Way; Fairport, New York 14450; United States; 43.0798°N 77.4150°W

Information
- Type: Public
- Established: 1874; 152 years ago
- School district: Fairport Central School District
- NCES School ID: 361089000860
- Principal: Patrick Grow
- Teaching staff: 109.76 (on an FTE basis)
- Grades: 9-12
- Gender: Co-ed
- Enrollment: 1,245 (2024-2025)
- Student to teacher ratio: 11.34
- Campus: Suburban: Large
- Houses: Blue, Red, White
- Colors: Red, White and Blue
- Fight song: On Old Fairport
- Athletics conference: Section V (NYSPHSAA); Monroe County Public School Athletic Conference
- Sports: 37 varsity sports
- Mascot: Red Raiders
- Rival: Rush-Henrietta Senior High School; Pittsford Mendon High School; Pittsford Sutherland High School; McQuaid Jesuit High School; East Rochester Junior-Senior High School
- Accreditation: New York State Education Department
- Newspaper: The Lampion
- Yearbook: The Hourglass
- Feeder schools: Minerva DeLand High School
- Website: www.fairport.org/highschool
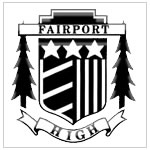

Fairport High School (FHS) is a public high school serving the ninth through twelfth grades in the Village of Fairport and most of the Town of Perinton, New York. It is part of the Fairport Central School District. The Principal, as of July 2026, is Patrick Grow following his time as principal of Johanna Perrin Middle School.

Current enrollment estimates place the student population around 1,700. The Class of 2009 was the largest class to pass through FHS in approximately 15 years, totaling just over 600 students. FHS takes part in numerous international exchange programs, including trips to Ireland, France, Spain, Germany and Italy.

In 2009, Fairport became the first high school in New York State to offer a course in Game Design and Development. On a similar note, after district residents approved a technology funding measure, the Fairport Central School District made plans for a complete technological overhaul of FHS which began during the summer of 2010.

== History ==
Prior to the introduction of high school classes to Fairport, families with the means could send their teenage children to academies or seminaries in nearby towns. (Note: For example, The History of Macedon Academy lists dozens of alumni from Fairport and Perinton.)

In 1874, the State Board of Regents accredited the former Fairport Classical and Union Free School on West Church Street in the Village of Fairport as a high school. (Note: As a union school, it continued to educate students in grades 1–8 after the high school course was introduced.) Originally it offered a three-year high school course, but this was expanded to four in 1895.

In September 1924, after the village population increased half again in size over the preceding decade and a state law was passed raising the age of compulsory education to 18, the first dedicated high school opened on West Avenue in the village. In September 1959, the Minerva DeLand School on Hulburt Road became the district's high school. July 10, 1968 marked the groundbreaking of the current Fairport High School on Ayrault Road, which opened to students on December 7, 1970.

=== FHS FACT 12 ===
In 1996 FHS was given permission to broadcast educational programs on FACT 12, programs included the FHS Morning Show, Homecoming events, Concerts, Award Ceremonies, and Sporting Events.

== Campus/school site ==
=== Pre-1970 campus ===
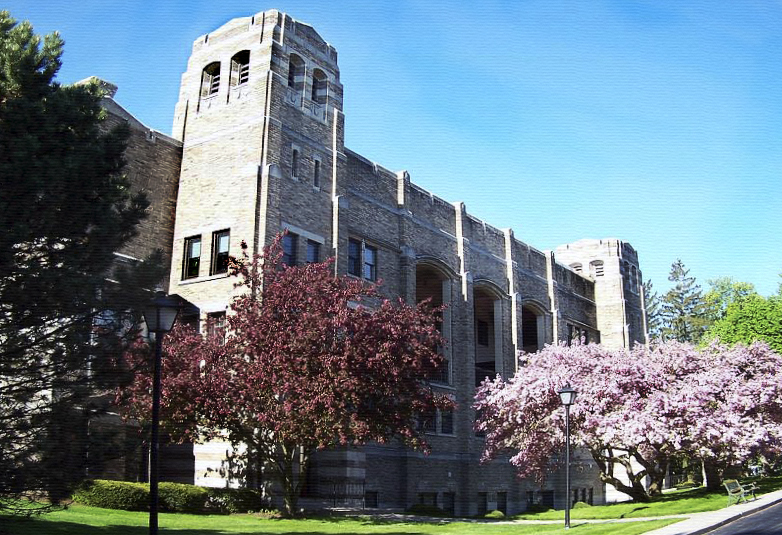
The original Fairport High School, in the Village of Fairport, has been converted to condominiums.

From 1924 to 1959, the Fairport High School campus was located at 71 West Avenue, only two blocks from Main Street in the village. The building was originally 166 feet front by 135 feet deep and included an auditorium with a 32 by 20 foot stage, a 40 by 70 foot gymnasium, a laboratory for chemistry and physics, and a laboratory for biology. Classes for the seventh and eighth grades were conducted on the first floor alongside offices for the superintendent and principal. Classes for the higher grades were held on the second floor. The basement contained the school cafeteria and kitchens as well as rooms for manual training, home economics, and business classes.

From 1965 until the early 1980s, the old campus served as the West Avenue School, with grades 4–6. As the school district's needs changed, the old campus was sold in 1984 and developed into condominiums. Likewise, after the high school moved out of the Classical and Union Free School building in 1924, that building served as the South Side Elementary School until its demolition in 1955. As of 2016, the Minerva DeLand School continues to serve ninth grade high school students.

=== Post-1970 campus ===
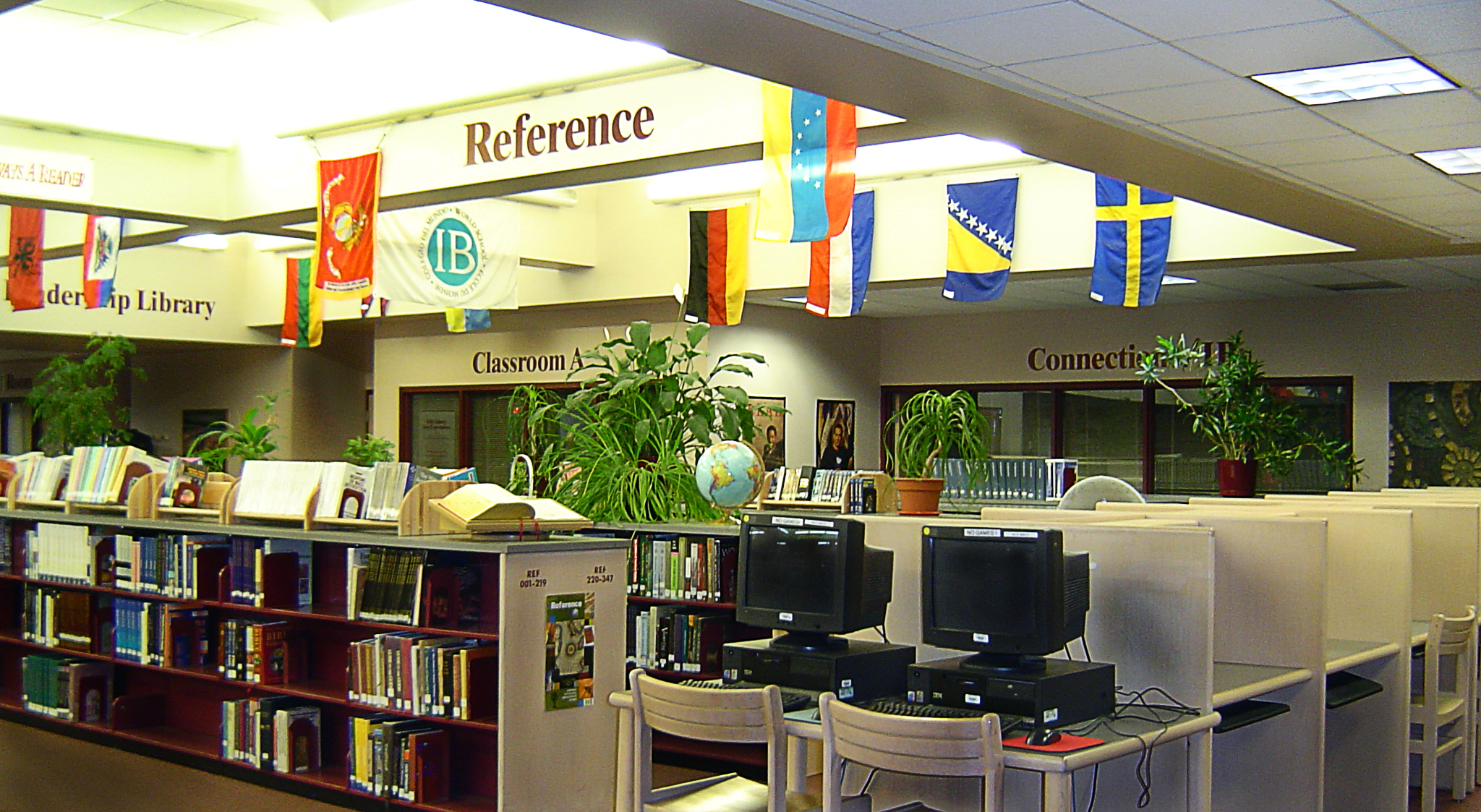
Fairport High School library includes a large selection of books and computers for research

As the population of the town increased the town saw the need to build a much larger high school. The campus was relocated to 1358 Ayrault Road to accommodates a much larger campus. In 1968 land was broken for the new Fairport High School Campus.

==== Fields ====
The new campus was much larger than its predecessor which included a much larger surface area for athletic events to be held on. The athletic fields include:

- Track and field Approved in 2000
- Football Turf Field with 1,000 Seat Bleacher named after former coach Joe Cummings
- 5 Tennis courts
- Discus/hammer Throw field
- 2 Softball fields
- 2 Baseball fields
- 4 General purpose fields

In addition, there is a concession stand as well as an admissions booth used for FHS Sporting Events. In 2019, the residents within Fairport approved an expansion onto these fields. Construction is set to begin in 2020.

==== Indoor facilities ====
- Athletics
  - Competition swimming/diving pool
  - 1 Gym divided Into 4 sections
- General
  - 3 cafeterias
  - 1 Small auditorium
  - 1 Large auditorium
  - Autoshop
  - Woodshop
  - 3 art/crafts rooms
  - 3 music rooms
  - 4 Computer labs
  - Library
  - Staff offices

==== Construction projects/other ====
In the 1990s an East and West Wing was added to the school which held additional class space. In 2006 there were plans for a 50,000-square-foot (4,600 m^{2}) field house and the installation of lights on the football field. The fall 2011 sports season is the first time the new field lights are in use. In 2007 a multi-use turf field was approved. The Fairport Forward Capital Improvement Project commenced in 2020 and oversees the improvement of athletic fields as well as reconstruction of science labs and main cafeteria.

== Academics ==
The high school is divided into three houses (Red, White, Blue) each with its own assistant principal. Several course areas are offered to students:

- Art, business, English, family and consumer science, foreign languages (Spanish, French, German), health, mathematics, music, physical education, science, social studies, and technology

There are services to students with disabilities, and a curriculum leading to the International Baccalaureate – Fairport HS was the first High School in Monroe County to offer this program.

However, the IB programs were cut at FHS after the 2011–12 school year due to budget constraints.

=== Music ===
Day Jazz, Afternoon Jazz, Sophomore Band, Symphonic Band, Concert Band, Full Orchestra, Chamber Orchestra, Polyphonic Women's Choir, Polyphonic Mixed Choir, and Sophomore Choir are all credit-bearing ensembles. The groups usually obtain gold or gold with distinction ratings at NYSSMA festivals. Students from the three bands are also members of the Pep Band, which plays at home games, at pep rallies, and in parades. A Pit Orchestra is also selected from the top students every year to perform during the spring musical.

The Prisms Concert, which takes place every spring, is a concert featuring many of these groups, as well as students performing solos or small group pieces. This concert is unique because the groups play in different areas of the auditorium. A spotlight focuses on the group or student performing as they play one three-minute piece. When they finish, the spotlight moves to another performer.

=== Higher level courses ===
- Advanced Placement courses are offered at Fairport High School to allow students planning to attend college to get a head start on courses. Advanced Placement courses that are offered include Language & Composition, English Humanities, Spanish, Statistics, AB Calculus, BC Calculus, Computer Science, Biology, Chemistry, Physics B, Physics C, Music Theory, U.S. History, American History: Humanities, European History and World History.
- The Project Advance program offers courses that allow students to earn transferable college credit early through a special program at Syracuse University. Courses include Information Technology, Economics, Policy Analysis, Psychology, Forensic Science, and Sociology.
- Cisco Networking courses at Fairport High School reward passing students with entry-level Cisco Career Certifications for networking.

== Extracurricular activities ==
=== Athletics ===
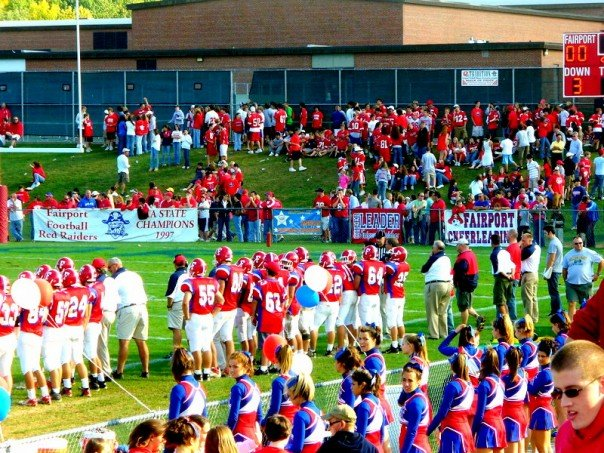
FHS Homecoming Football Game

The Fairport High School athletic nickname is the Red Raiders. The school's colors are red, white and blue. FHS has a strong athletic tradition in many of its varsity sports such as baseball, basketball, cheerleading, football, field hockey, ice hockey, lacrosse, tennis, volleyball, soccer, softball, swimming, gymnastics, and cross country. Fairport offers 35 varsity sports as well as offerings at the junior varsity and modified levels.

In 2006 and 2007, Fairport won the Class AAA basketball championship in Section 5. In both years the team played against its archrival Rush Henrietta. In 2017, the Red Raiders won the Class AA championship and advanced to the NYSPHSAA Championship, losing to Mount Vernon. The cheerleading squad has won three national titles as well as numerous other sectional and regional titles. The baseball team won three consecutive Section 5 Class AAA titles in 2005, 2006 and 2007. As well as being ranked No. 1 in the state 16 times since 1982, the men's swimming program at Fairport High School has won 20 Section V Class A titles, including 17 in a row from 1981 to 1997.

Along with winning the Class A Section 5 championship 10 times, the cross country team also had a state champion, Pat Dupont, in 2007.

=== Student organizations/clubs ===
==== FHS FIRST Robotics team ====
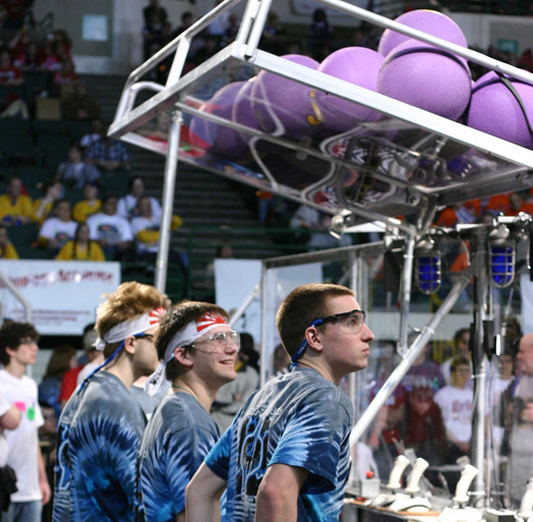
FHS FRC 578

Fairport High School's FIRST Robotics team has been a participant in the FIRST Robotics Competition program since they were founded. When the team was founded in 1997 they were sponsored by Eastman Kodak and was known as Team 36 Kod-Red and, was the first suburban FIRST team in the Rochester, NY region. In 1999 Kodak discontinued its sponsorship and the Gleason Works became the sponsor for the team known as Team 578 Blue Lightning. The team is no longer sponsored by the Gleason Works, but Xerox Corporation has agreed to become the team's new major sponsor. They are supported mainly by the Fairport High School. During the 2010–2011 school year, the team changed its name to Red Raider Robotics (R^3) so it would be more closely linked with the school. In 2000 they became the FIRST Philadelphia Regional Winners and the year after they became the FIRST Nasa VCU Regional Winners. In 2004 the team became the FRC Pittsburgh Finalist. In 2007 They won the Woodie Flowers award at the Finger Lakes Regional. In 2011 they won the Engineering Inspiration Award at the Finger Lakes Regional. A few years later in 2016 in the FRC game STRONGHOLD at the New York City Regional they placed as a Regional Finalist as well as won the Team Spirit Award.

== Notable alumni/faculty ==
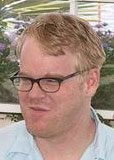
Philip Seymour Hoffman

- Rick Beato, YouTube personality, music educator
- Philip Seymour Hoffman, Academy Award-winning actor, Capote
- Gordy Hoffman, Waldo Salt Screenwriting Award Winner (Sundance Film Festival), Founder of The BlueCat Screenplay Competition
- Vijay Iyer, Grammy Award-nominated jazz musician
- Julia Nunes, YouTube music artist
- Kim Pegula, Businesswoman and co-owner of Pegula Sports and Entertainment, Buffalo Bills and Buffalo Sabres
- Sian Proctor, geology professor, science communicator, and commercial astronaut
- Nicholas Ranjan, District Judge for the United States District Court for the Western District of Pennsylvania
- Joel C. Rosenberg, Novelist, Political strategist, Philanthropist
- Tim Soudan, professional lacrosse player and coach (Rochester Knighthawks, Rochester Rattlers, Chrome Lacrosse Club)
- Robert E. Wright, Nef Family Chair of Political Economy, Augustana College SD
- David G. Perkins, Four Star General (retired) from the United States Military

== Principals ==
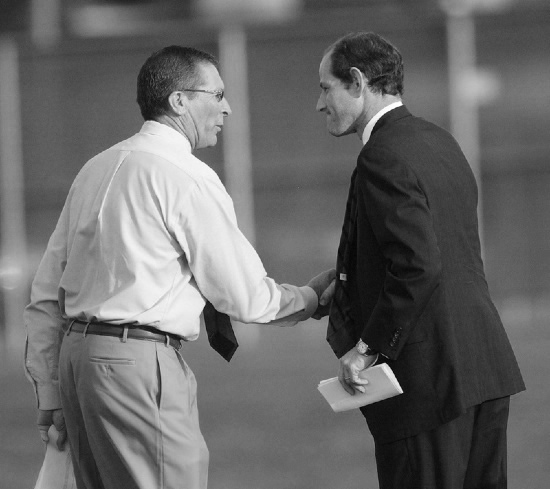
Former FHS Principal David Paddock (left) shakes hands with Former New York Governor Spitzer

Principals
Name	Tenure
John R. Gordon	August 1873 – 1883
Augustus S. Downing	July 1883 – 1886
Floyd J. Bartlett	September 1886 – 1891
William D. Manro	1891 – 1893
Elmer G. Frail	July 1893 – 1896
Arthur C. Simmons	December 1896 – June 1901
Thomas C. Wilbur	August 1901 – June 1903
Arthur Cain Nute	July 1903 – June 1906
Ira M. Gast	July 1906 – April 1908
Albert H. Watkins	April 1908 – 1908
Frederick A. Woodward	September 1908 – June 1912
George A. Burton	July 1912 – 1915
John Lee Hopkins	January 1916 – September 1917
Albert T. Bouck	October 1917 – 1920
H. Claude Hardy	August 1920 – December 1920
Minerva L. DeLand	January 1921 – June 1935
Andrew C. Lynch	July 1935 – 1948
Nelson R. Burton	1948 – August 1954
Leon Warner	August 1954 – January 1955 (interim)
Charles E. Witty	January 1955 – August 1970
Lyman C. Cook	September 1970 – 1991
Robert L. Reiter	1991 – 1995
David M. Paddock	1995 – 2008
Pamula F. Ciranni	2008 – 2009 (interim)
Christopher Salinas	July 2009 – May 2012
Gerald E. Bucklin	May 2012 – August 2012 (interim)
Joseph D. Fantigrossi	September 2012 – October 2014
Robert Clark	October 2014 – December 2014 (interim); December 2014 – July 2026
Patrick Grow	July 2026 - Present

== Major school events ==
=== Brotherhood/sisterhood week ===
Every spring, Fairport students celebrate Brotherhood/Sisterhood Week. The week is focused around Civility, Awareness, Respect, and Embrace (CARE). The event is most prominent at FHS, where a different activity takes place each day of the week. Monday is Family Talk Day, during which a student and an adult are selected to speak to the students. Tuesday consists of a presentation during which student voices writings are read. The writings anonymously tell students' feelings about CARE. On Wednesday, a community member is asked to speak. On Wednesday of the 2007 celebration, Rachel's Challenge visited the school. The program encouraged students to improve the atmosphere of their school. The program impacted the students in a large way, partly because they had lost a beloved member of the student body the night before. Wednesday is also the annual Junior-4th Grade walk. The district's 4th and 11th graders walk the village streets together to build relationships with each other. Thursday's program is known as Unplugged, and is a non-stop musical performance available to students with free periods or lunch. Friday concludes the eventful week with Outreach Day. On this day, the entire school is bused to the three elementary schools. Students meet with their new little brothers and sisters for an hour. They play games and teach them about CARE. A song written about this week by former students Sean Lyness, John Cieply, Pat Dupont, and David Lachance is played yearly.

== Graduation ==
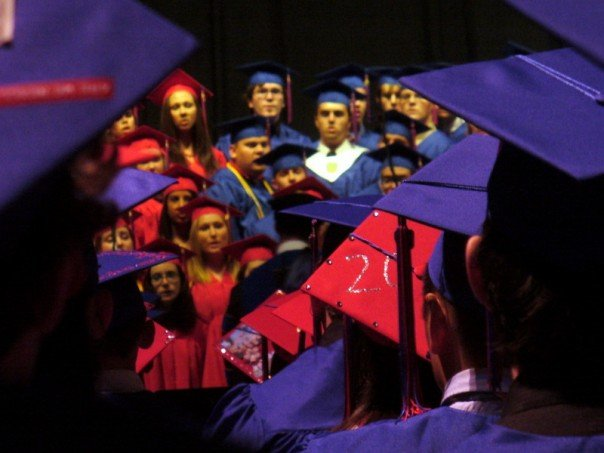
Fairport High School Students Sing the Graduation Song at the 2007 Fairport HS Graduation

Fairport High School holds its high school graduation at the Blue Cross Arena in downtown Rochester, NY. However, no graduation was held in June 2020, and students graduated at Innovative Field in June 2021. Both changes were due to concerns involving the COVID-19 pandemic.

== See also ==
- Fairport Central School District
- Fairport, New York
- Rochester, New York
