= Minerva and Daniel DeLand House =

Historic house in New York, United States

- U.S. National Register of Historic Places
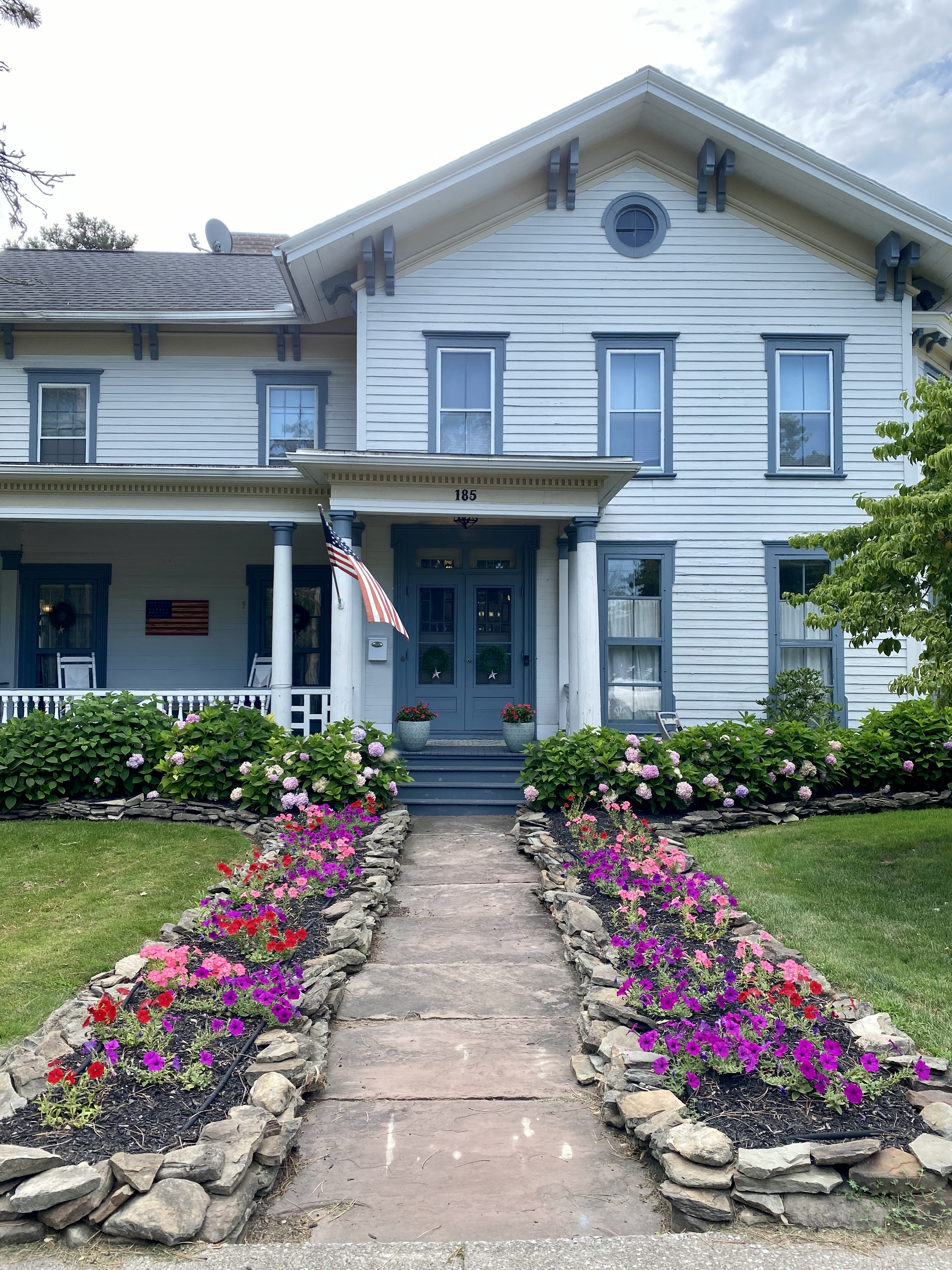
- Minerva and Daniel DeLand House, July 2020

- Location within New York Location within the United States
- Location: Fairport, New York
- Built: 1856
- Architectural style: Italianate
- NRHP reference No.: 100004913
- Added to NRHP: January 30, 2020

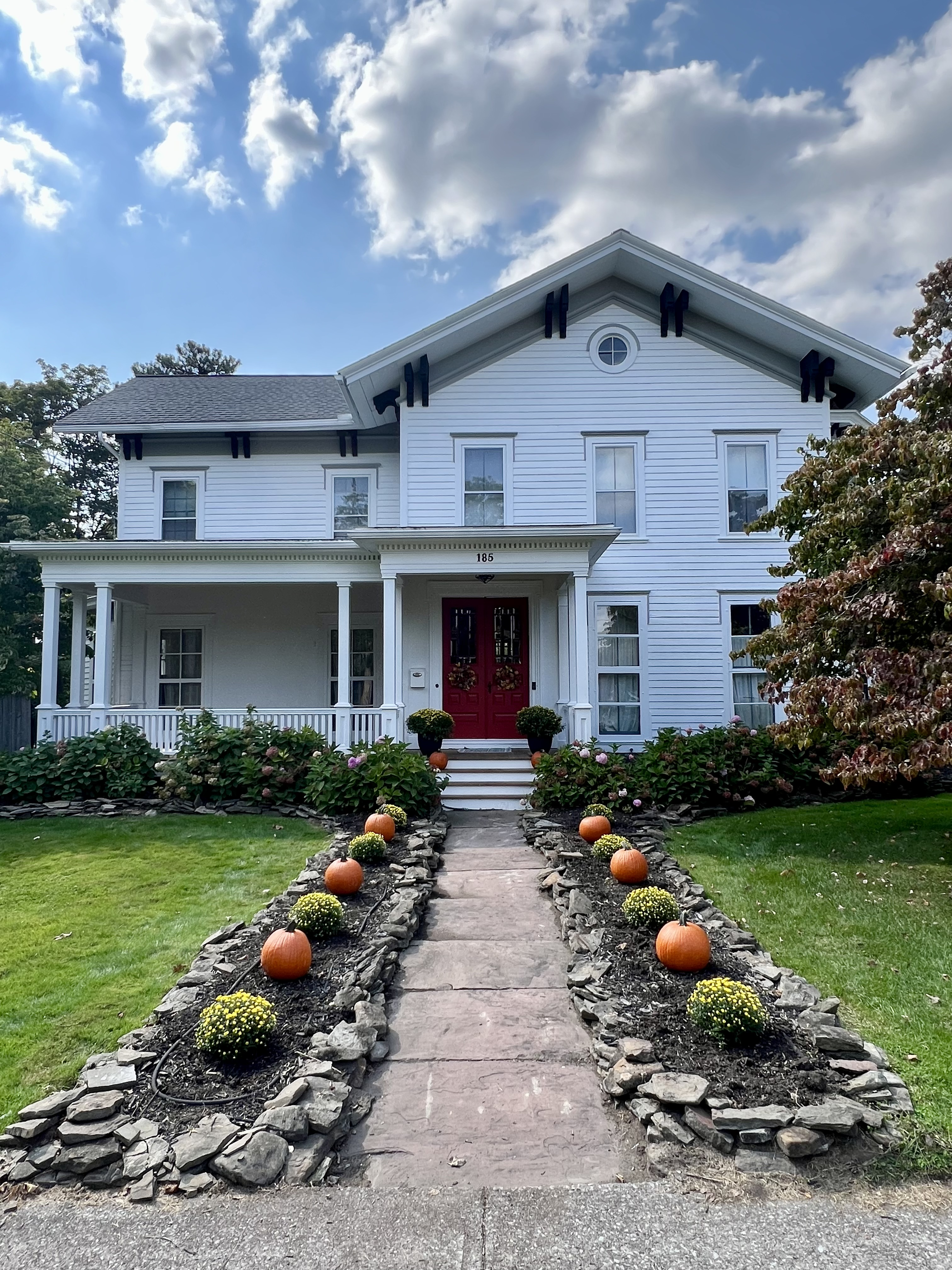

Minerva and Daniel DeLand House was built in 1856 in the village of Fairport, New York, as a home for Minerva and Daniel DeLand. DeLand was a baking soda manufacturer. It is located at 185 North Main Street at the intersection of North Main street and Whitney Road.

The wood shingled Italianate building has a wood front porch, three chimneys, decorative corbels, and original doors and windows.
