= First Baptist Church of Fairport =

Historic church in New York, United States

- U.S. National Register of Historic Places
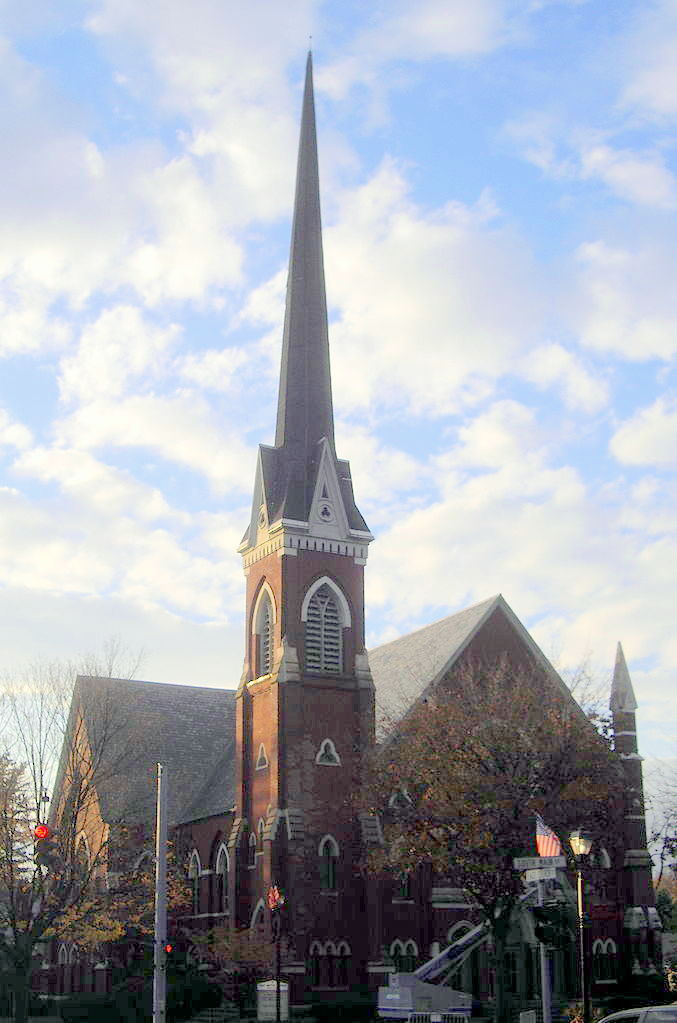

- Location within New York Location within the United States
- Location: 94 S. Main St., Fairport, New York
- Coordinates: 43°6′2″N 77°26′32″W
- Area: 0.8 acres (0.32 ha)
- Built: 1876
- Architect: Thomas, J.R.
- Architectural style: Late Victorian, Gothic
- NRHP reference No.: 06000892
- Added to NRHP: September 28, 2006

The First Baptist Church of Fairport is a historic Baptist church located at 94 South Main Street at Church Street in Fairport, Monroe County, New York. It was built in 1876, and is a 2 1/2-story, cruciform plan, High Victorian Gothic church. It is constructed of brick and rests on a Medina sandstone foundation. It has a large square corner tower topped by a tall narrow spire. It features ornamental stone trim, a steeply pitched gray slate roof, and 72 original stained, leaded glass windows. In 2006 a national drugstore tried to buy the land but, in response to adverse local reactions including a concert held by local youth musicians, money was raised to help repair the church instead.

It was listed on the National Register of Historic Places in 2006.
