= Wilbur House =

Historic house in New York, United States

- U.S. National Register of Historic Places
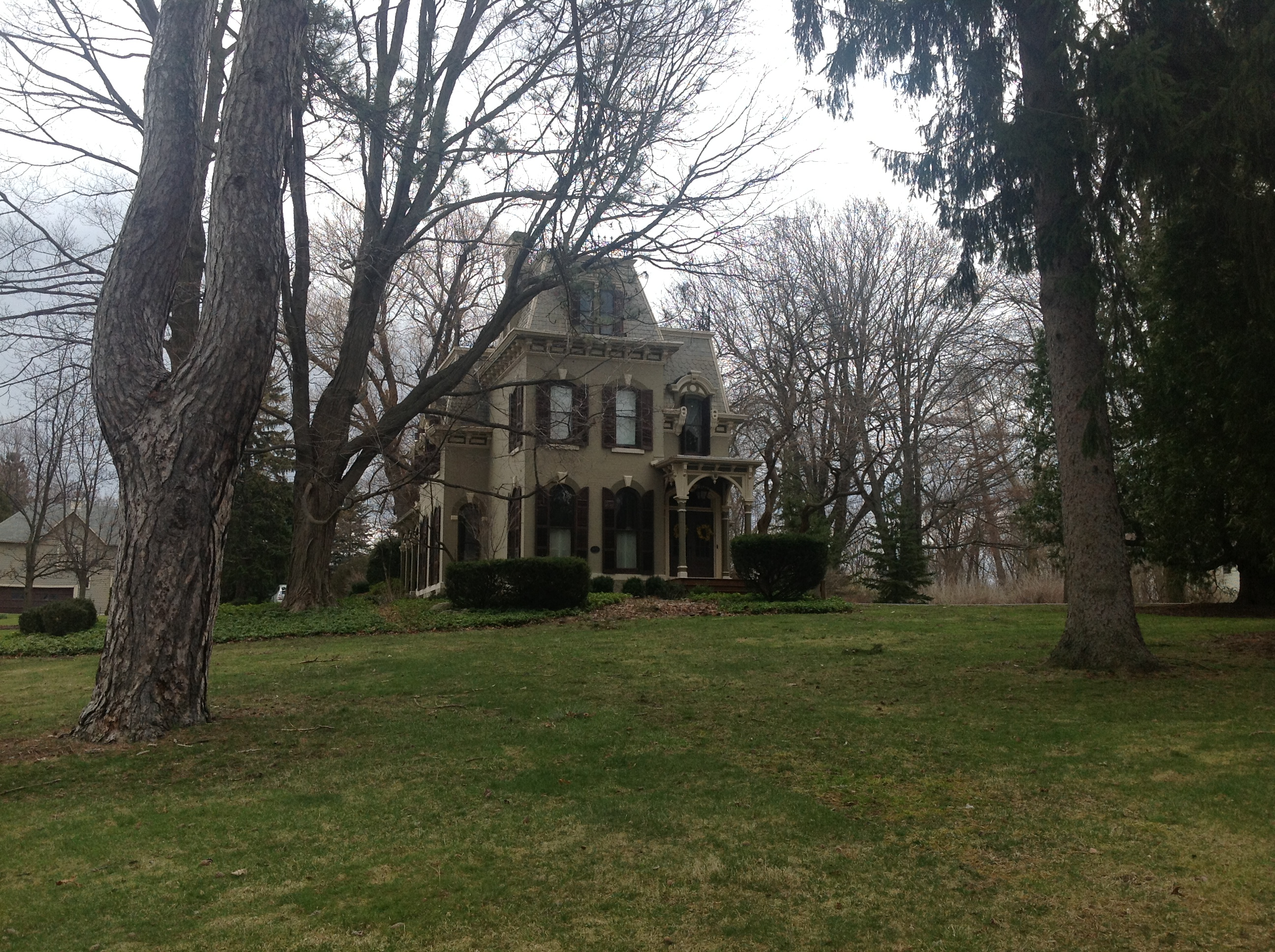

- Location within New York Location within the United States
- Location: 187 S. Main St., Fairport, New York
- Coordinates: 43°5′40″N 77°26′30″W
- Area: 7 acres (2.8 ha)
- Built: 1873
- Architectural style: Second Empire
- NRHP reference No.: 80002651
- Added to NRHP: May 06, 1980

Wilbur House is a historic home located on Main Street in Fairport, Monroe County, New York. It is a Second Empire–style structure built around 1873 that features a two-bay, two-story tower that projects from the northeast corner of the 1 1/2-story front section. The tower, as well as the rest of the front section, is covered by a decorative fish-scale and octagonal slate mansard roof. Also on the property is a contributing carriage house.

It was listed on the National Register of Historic Places in 1980.

Hiram P. Wilbur was the superintendent (some say the first such) of the westernmost section of the Erie Canal, and also the postmaster for the town of Perinton. The home he built in 1873 later served as a boarding school before reverting to a private residence. The house is currently 3,792 square feet (352.3 m^{2}) with five bedrooms. Many of the historic details have been retained, including speaking tubes for intra-house communication.
