= Ferguson Gas Station =

- U.S. National Register of Historic Places
- Location within Arkansas Location within the United States
- Location: Jct. of Center and US 65, SE corner, Marshall, Arkansas
- Coordinates: 35°54′37″N 92°37′52″W
- Area: less than one acre
- Built by: Zeb Ferguson, Doc Treat
- Architectural style: Plain Traditional
- MPS: Searcy County MPS
- NRHP reference No.: 93000967
- Added to NRHP: October 4, 1993

The Ferguson Gas Station is a historic automotive service station at Center Street and United States Route 65 in Marshall, Arkansas. It is a small single-story structure, with sandstone walls and brick quoining at the corners and openings. It has a steeply pitched gable roof, with a slightly projecting cross gable above the entrance. The station was built about 1927 by Zeb Ferguson, in a style first popularized by the Pure Oil Company.

The building was listed on the National Register of Historic Places in 1993.

== See also ==
- National Register of Historic Places listings in Searcy County, Arkansas
