= Joe Manhertz =

American sports director

Biographical details
- Education: Colgate University, Ohio State University

Playing career
- 1992–1996: Colgate
- 1992–1995: Colgate
- Positions: Basketball, Football

Administrative career (AD unless noted)
- 1996–1997: Colgate (Intern)
- 1997–1998: Ohio State (GA)
- 1999–2006: Syracuse (Associate AD)
- 2006–2007: Hamilton (Associate AD)
- 2007–2010: Ohio State (Director of Development)
- 2010–2021: Duke (Associate AD)
- 2021–2024: St. Bonaventure

Joe Manhertz is an American sports professional who formerly served as the director of athletics for St. Bonaventure University. He previously served as associate athletic director at Duke University from 2010 to 2021, and in various administrative roles at the Ohio State University, Hamilton College, Syracuse University, and Colgate University. Manhertz grew up in Fairport, New York.

He attended college at Colgate University, where he played college football and college basketball on the school's football and basketball teams. Manhertz was named athletic director at St. Bonaventure University on August 19, 2021.

Manhertz resigned his role as athletic director at St. Bonaventure on March 22, 2024, following controversy surrounding his decision for the men's basketball team to decline an invite to the 2024 National Invitation Tournament.
