= Fairport Central School District =

School district in New York, United States

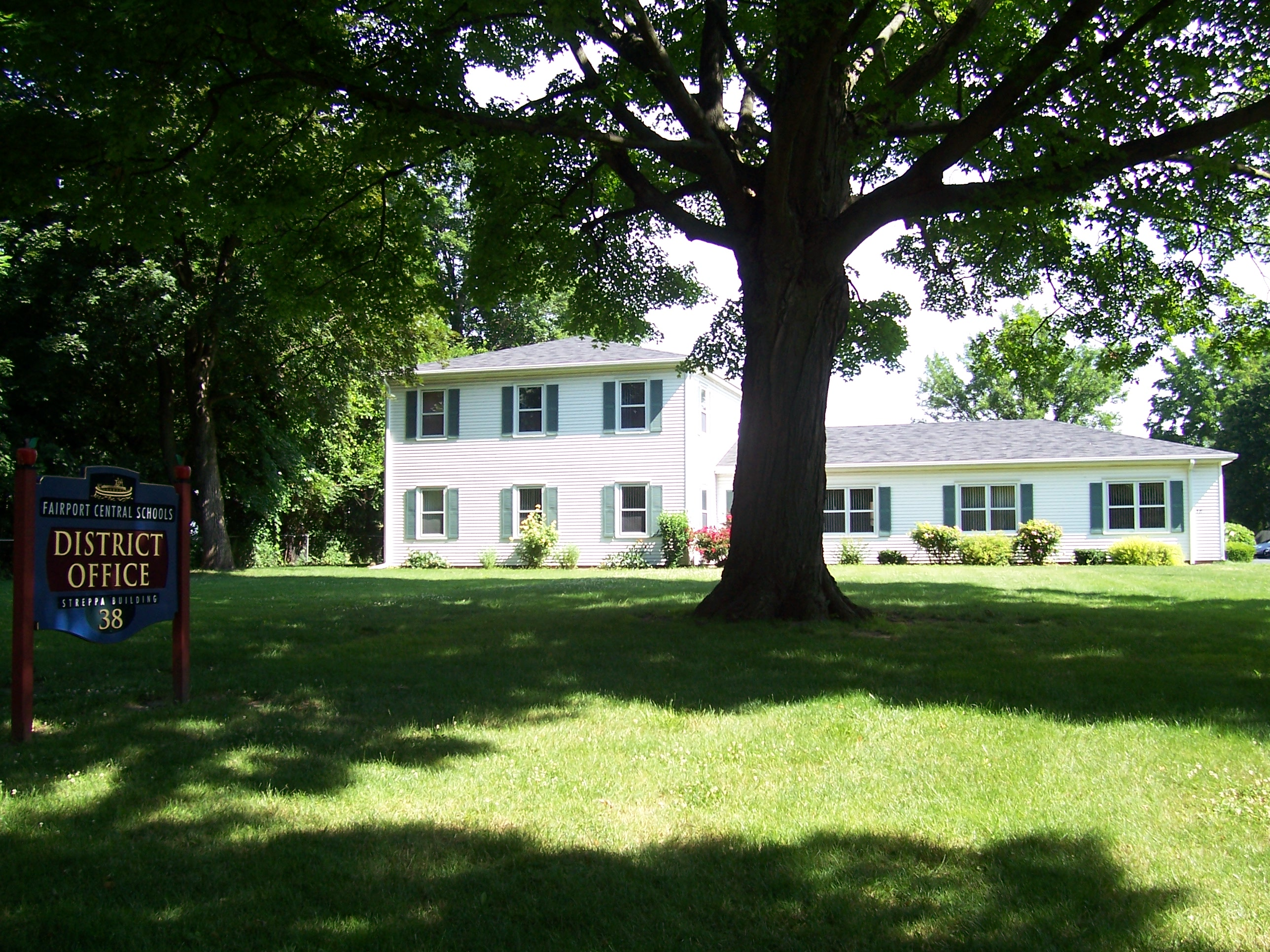
- Main office in the Streppa building in the village of Fairport. The Streppa building was built on the site of the former Fairport Classical and Union Free School in 1971.

Location
- 38 West Church Street; Fairport, New York 14450-2130 Monroe County
- Coordinates: 43.0991°N 77.4448°W

District information
- Type: Public
- Motto: A great place to teach and learn
- Grades: Pre-K–12
- Established: September 1951; 75 years ago
- President: Vacant
- Vice-president: Erica Belois-Pacer
- Superintendent: Brett C. Provenzano
- Asst. superintendent(s): Douglass Lauf- Human Resources and Labor Relations Matthew Stevens- Business
- School board: Peter Forsgren Joyce Kostyk Erica Belois-Pacer Margaret Cardona Janice Fortuna Dr. Brian Moritz Dr. Mary Caitlin Wight
- Governing agency: New York State Education Department
- Accreditation: New York State Education Department
- Schools: Four elementary schools (K–5, K–2, 3–5); Two middle schools (6–8); One high school (9-12)
- Budget: ▲US$127.0 million (2017-2018)
- NCES District ID: 3610890

Students and staff
- Students: ▼5802 (2017–2018)
- Faculty: ▼615 (2017–2018)
- Staff: ▲568 (2017–2018)
- Student–teacher ratio: K–2: 18:1, 3–5: 22:1, 6–8: 24:1, 9–12: 24:1 (2017–2018)
- Athletic conference: NYSPHSAA Section V Monroe County Public School Athletic Conference
- District mascot: Red Raiders
- Colors: Red, white and blue

Other information
- Unions: NYSUT; Fairport Educators' Association
- PTSA: Fairport Parent Teacher Student Associations
- State ranking: 78 of 675 (2019)
- Schedule: drive.google.com/file/d/1WPldgP6MmIpcxW_zY9LPnB3ybiJrAbLM/view
- Website: www.fairport.org

The Fairport Central School District is a public school district in New York State that serves approximately 5,800 students in most of the town of Perinton and the village of Fairport in Monroe County, with about 1,200 employees and an operating budget of $127.0 million ($21,895 per student).

The student-teacher ratios are 18:1 for grades K–2, 22:1 for grades 3–5, 24:1 for grades 6–8, and 24:1 for grades 9–12. The median teacher experience is 14 years and the median teacher salary is $63,339.

As of 2016, Brett Provenzano is the superintendent.

== History ==
The predecessor for the district was a series of eleven district schools opened in the Town of Perinton in the 1810s through the 1830s. From 1826 until 1872, the village was served by the district 9 school which was situated in two different buildings on East Church Street. In 1872, the Fairport Classical and Union School opened on West Church Street. Along with the Northside School (1886) on East Avenue and Fairport High School (1924) on West Avenue, it became part of system of schools that served the town population increasingly concentrated in the village. In 1920, the board of education for the village schools hired its first superintendent.

Voters approved centralization of Perinton school districts 2 through 9 on April 30, 1951 and the centralized district began operating the following September. At that point most of the district schools had closed and students attended one of the village schools (the Northside School on East Avenue, the Southside School on West Church Street, or Fairport High School on West Avenue). The district opened the Johanna Perrin School on Potter Place in the Village in 1954, razing the Southside School (the former Fairport Classical and Union Free School) the following year. In 1957, the district renamed the high school on West Avenue in honor of Martha A. Brown, and constructed a new high school, Minerva DeLand, in 1959. The Brooks Hill Primary School followed in 1962 and the Jefferson Avenue Elementary School in 1966. In 1965, the Martha Brown School moved to a new building on Ayrault Road. In 1970, the district opened Dudley and Northside elementary schools as well as the current high school on Ayrault Road. In the early 2000s the district briefly considered opening an additional elementary school in the hamlet of Egypt (to be named "White Brook" after the former district school 12), but could not secure enough funding from the state. In 1999 the village of Fairport, the FCSD and Monroe #1 BOCES announced a collaboration to have public ch 12 used for more than government meetings and programs. A full-time staff was put together to accomplish this goal. As of 2013, this channel is no longer in use. Board of Education meetings may be viewed online at fairport.org

Village school district superintendents
Name	Tenure
H. Claude Hardy	January 1921 – June 1925
Thomas G. Coffee	July 1925 – August 1951

Central school district superintendents
Name	Tenure
Frank A. Brokaw	September 1951 – June 1964
William McGregor Deller	July 1964 – June 1973
William J. McPhee	July 1973 – October 1977
Robert W. Mason	October 1977 – June 1978 (interim)
Anthony J. Teresa	July 1978 – June 1987
Myles M. Bigenwald	June 1987 – June 1988 (acting)
Paul R. Doyle	July 1988 – February 1995
Timothy J. McElheran	February 1995 – June 1998 (interim)
William C. Cala	July 1998 – June 2006
Barbara J. Gregory	July 2006 – September 2006 (interim)
Scott R. Covell	September 2006 – November 2006 (interim)
Jon G. Hunter	November 2006 – December 2013
William C. Cala	January 2014 – June 2015 (interim)
Brett C. Provenzano	July 1, 2015 – present

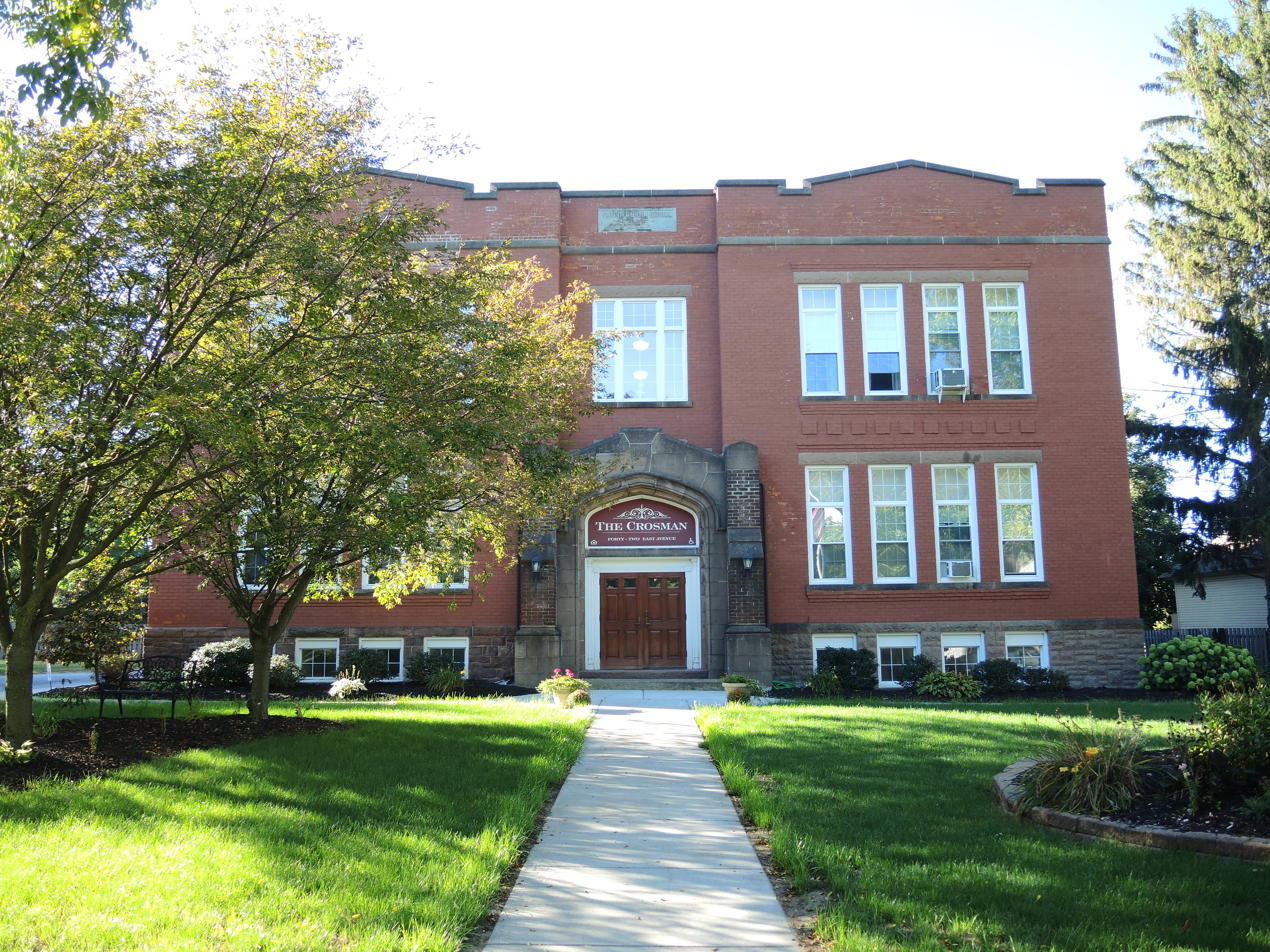
The former Northside School (also known as the East Avenue School) in the village functioned as an elementary school for students north of the Erie Canal from 1886 until the 1950s.

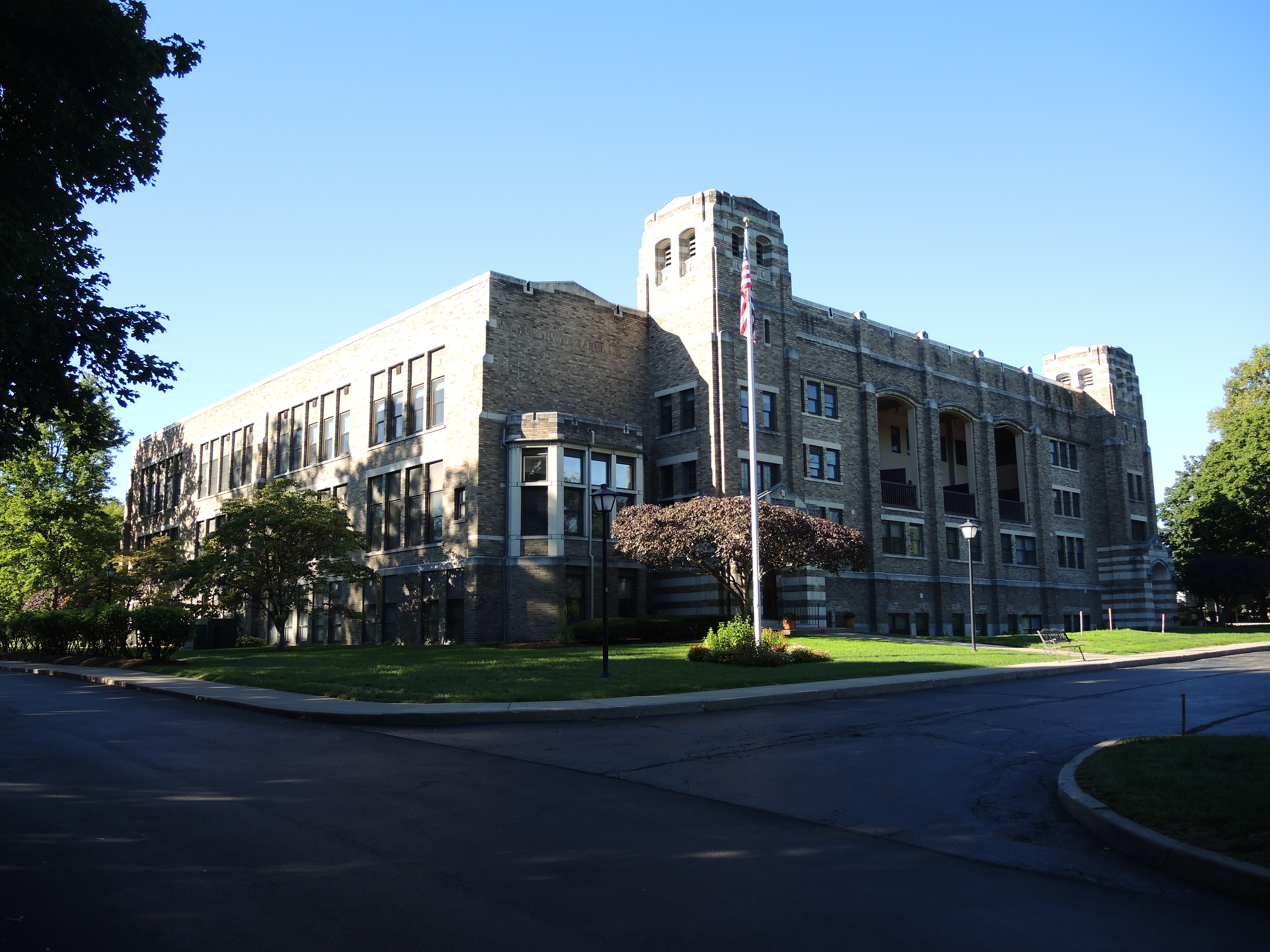
The former Fairport High School (also known as the West Avenue School) in the village served as the high school from 1924 until 1959, then as Martha Brown Junior High School until 1965, and then as an elementary school until 1983.

== General information ==
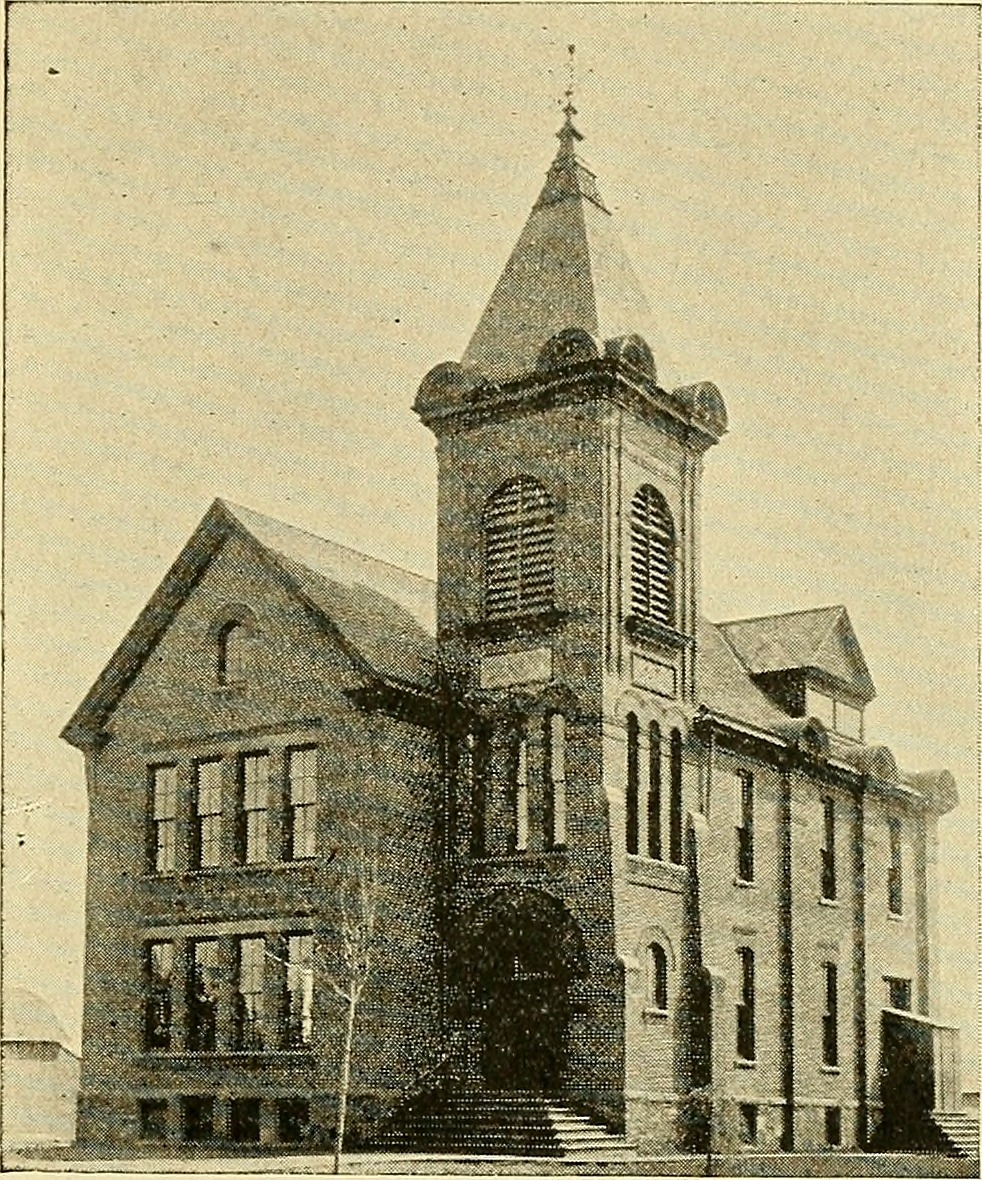
The Northside School as it appeared in the early 20th century

The Fairport Central School District consists mostly of students from the Perinton/Fairport region, and is an avid participant in the Urban-Suburban program.

== Student statistics ==
Number of students per grade
Grade	Number of Students	Percent
Kindergarten	372	
Grades 1 - 5	2589	
Grades 6 - 8	1629	
Grades 9 - 12	2233	

Student distribution by ethnicity
Ethnicity	Number of Students	Percent
African American		4%
Hispanic		2%
White		91%
Native American		0%
Asian/Pacific Islander		4%

== Board of education ==
The Board of Education (BOE) consists of seven members who serve rotating three-year terms. Elections, when necessary, are held each May to fill the seats of members whose terms have expired. These elections occur alongside voting on the School District's annual budget.

Name	Position	Committees
	President/Board Member	MCSBA Presidents Committee, MCSBA Labor Relations Committee, MCSBA Executive Committee, Audit & Finance Committee, Wall of Distinction Committee
Erica Belois-Pacer	Board Member/Vice-President	MCSBA Information Exchange Committee, Audit & Finance Committee, Safety Committee
Damon W. Buffum	Board Member	MCSBA Labor Relations Committee, Technology Committee, District Planning Team, Facilities Committee, Safety Committee
Margaret S. Cardona	Board Member	Board Policy Committee, MCSBA Information Exchange Committee, District Planning Team, Facilities Committee, Instructional Council Committee
Joyce Kostyk	Board Member	Board Policy Committee, MCSBA Legislative Committee, Technology Committee, Instructional Council Committee
Mary Caitlin Wight	Board Member	Board Policy Committee, Wellness Committee, MCSBA Information Exchange Committee, Code of Conduct Committee

== Schools ==
=== Elementary schools ===
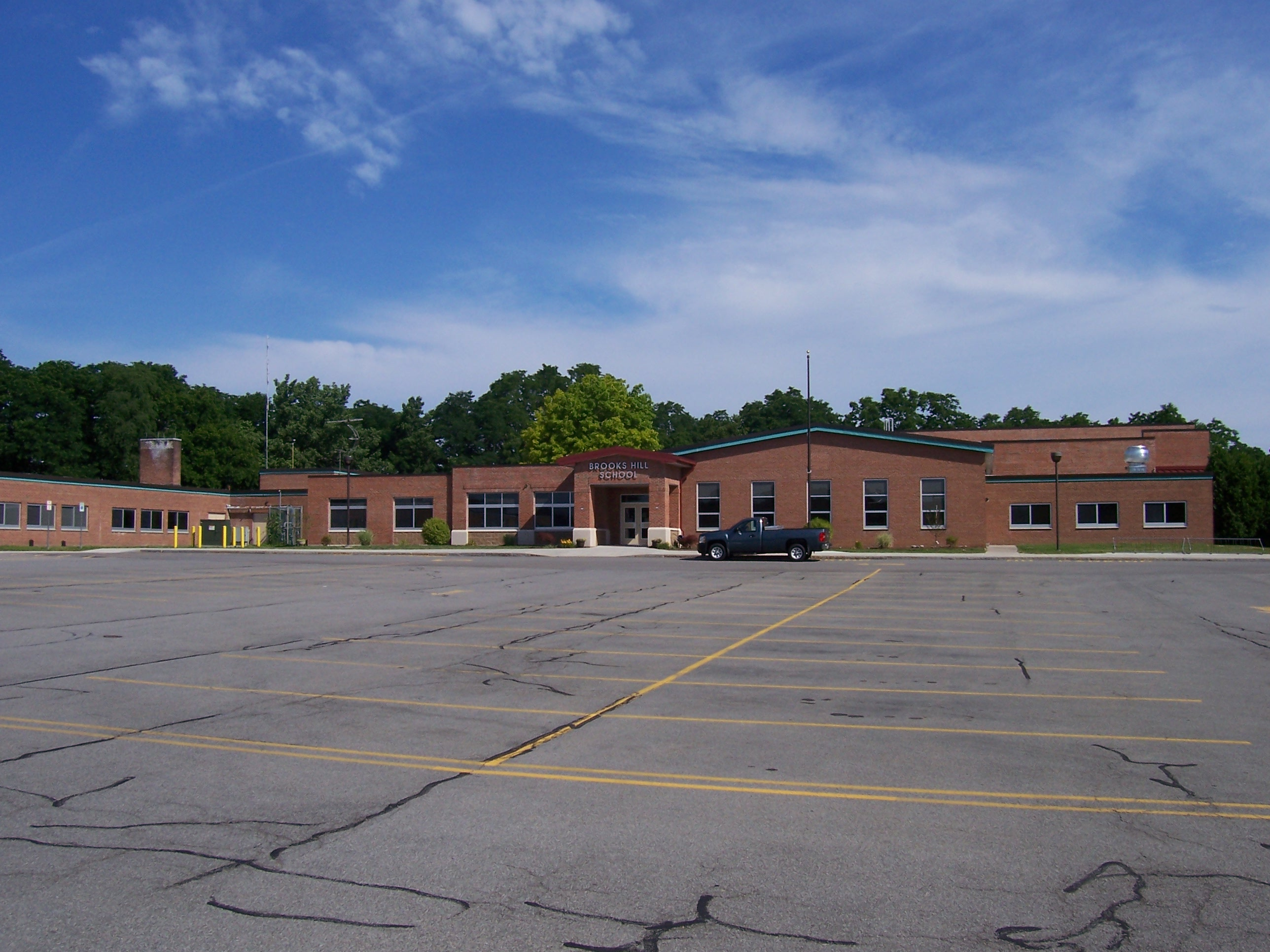
Brooks Hill Elementary School

- Brooks Hill Elementary School (K-5)

Principal: Meredith A. Klus

Asst. Principal: Caitlin Mack-Elliot

Lead Teacher: Heather Strack
Brooks Hill School opened in 1962 as a primary school and is named after Lewis Brooks who once farmed the land on which it stands.

- Dudley Elementary School (K-2)

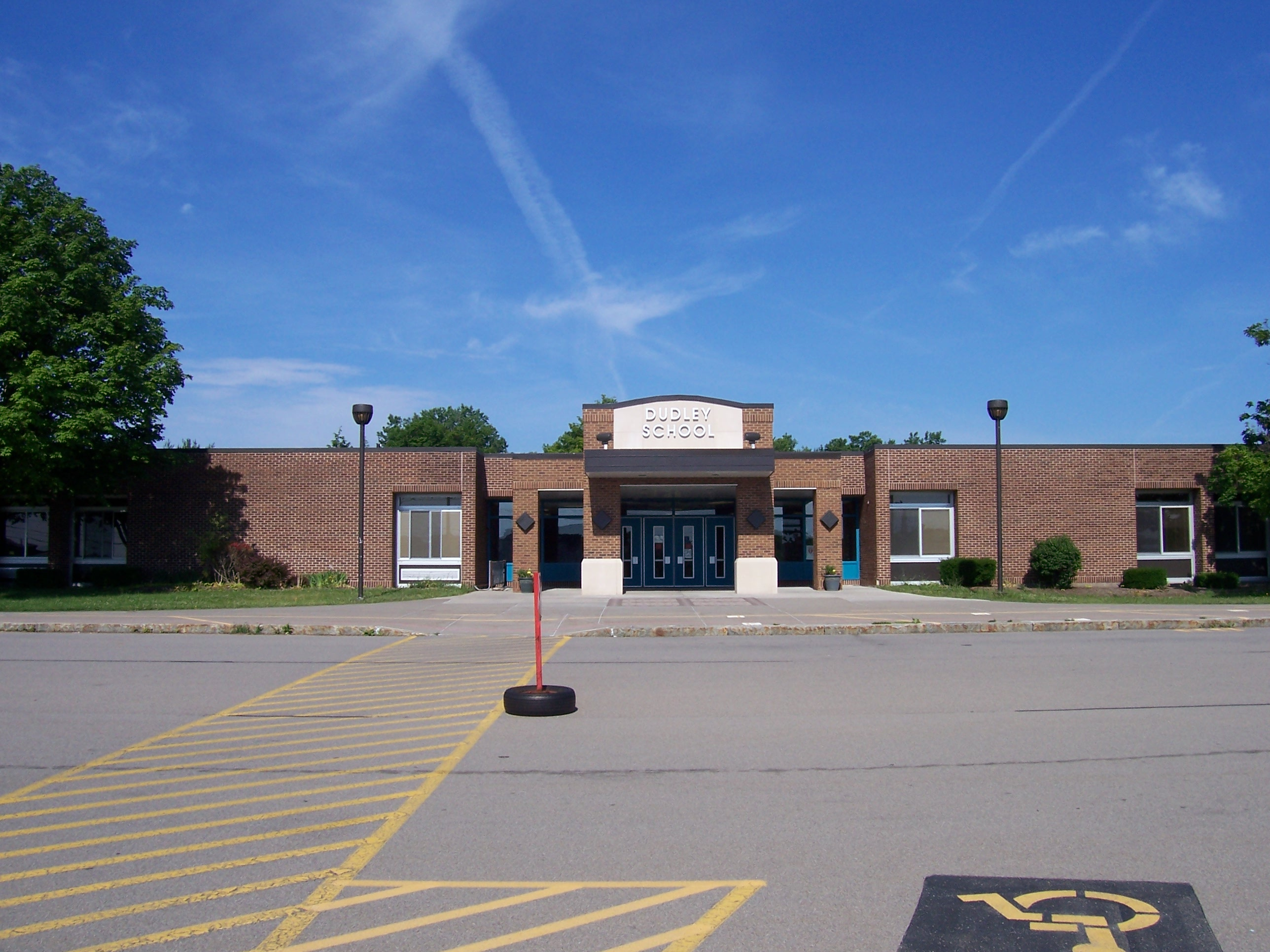
Dudley Elementary School

Principal: Sarah Welsh (2023-)

Asst. Principal: Caitlin Law (2022-)

Dudley Elementary School opened in 1970 alongside Northside Elementary School. It is named after longtime schoolboard member Robert A. Dudley.

- Jefferson Avenue Elementary School (K-5)

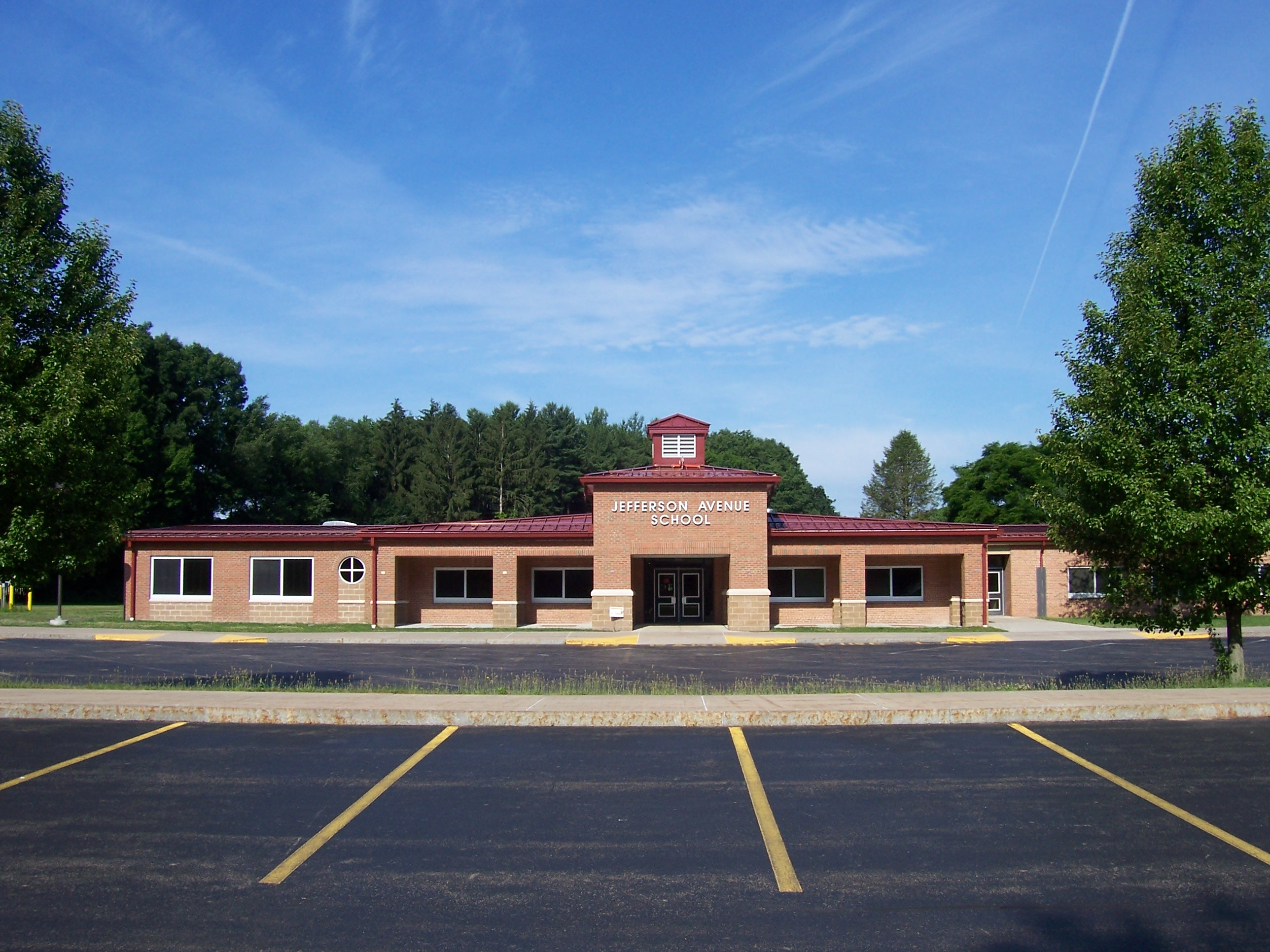
Jefferson Avenue Elementary School

Principal: Ryan Charno

Asst. Principal: Amy Busby

Lead Teacher: Jeannette Maloy
Jefferson Avenue Elementary School opened in 1966.

- Northside Elementary School (3-5)

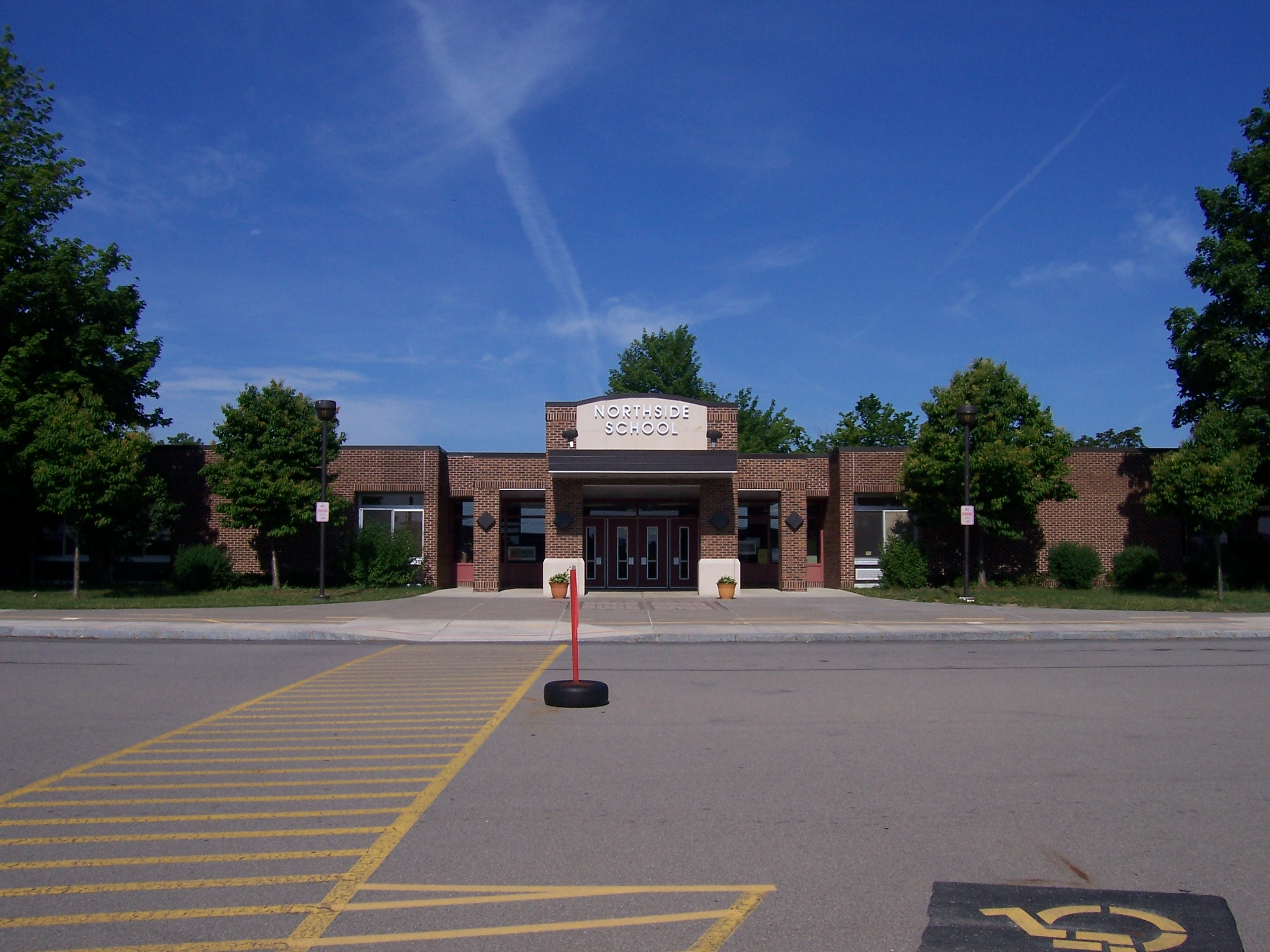
Northside Elementary School

Principal: Erin Moretter

Asst. Principal: Jeremy Slack

Northside Elementary School opened in 1970 alongside Dudley Elementary School. It is named after the original Northside School which was located on East Avenue in the village of Fairport.

=== Middle school ===
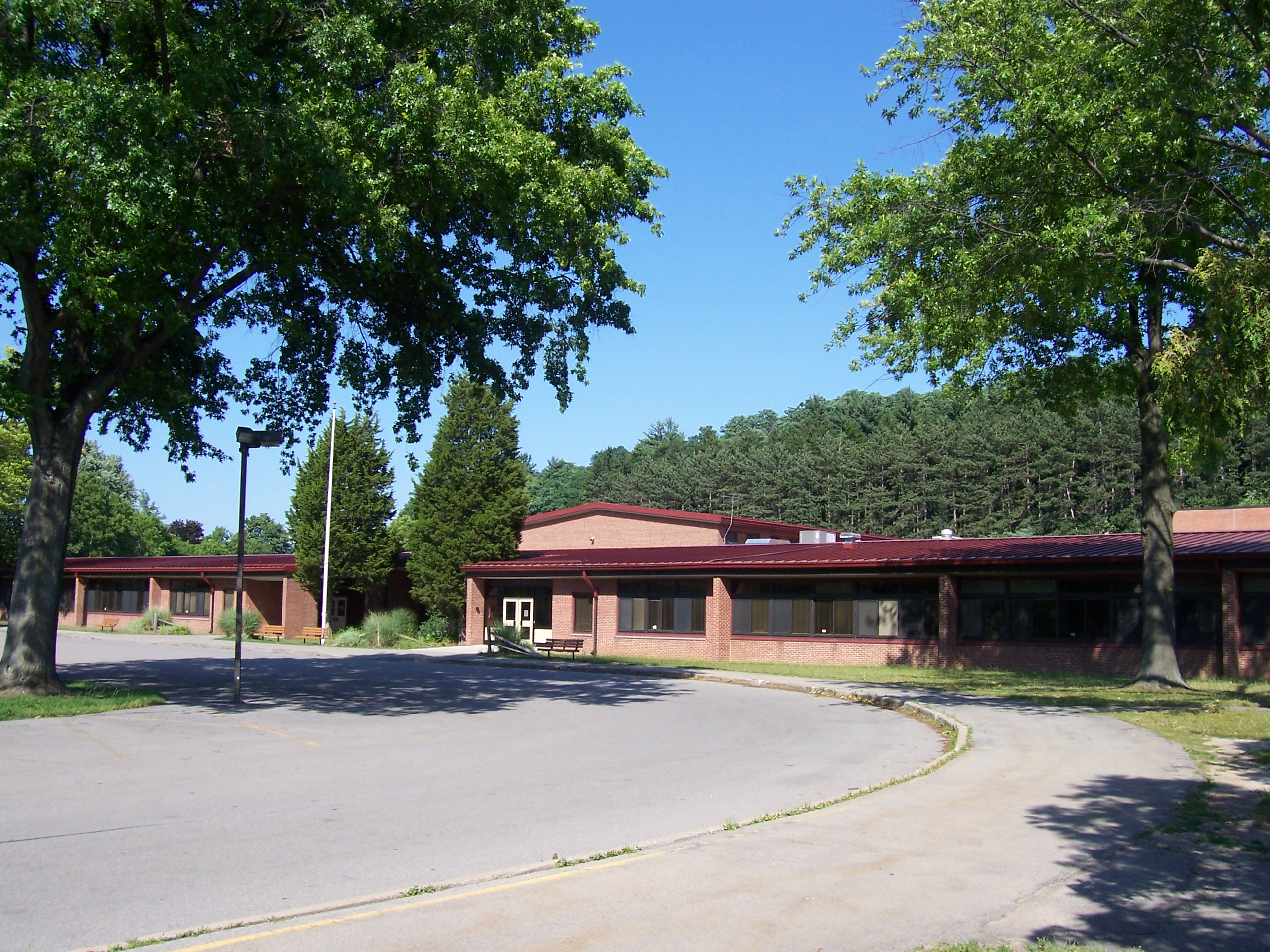
Johanna Perrin Middle School

- Johanna Perrin Middle School (6-8)

Principal: Patrick Grow

Asst. Principal: Rebecca Short
Perrin Middle School opened in 1954 as an elementary school and is named after the first white woman to settle in Perinton.

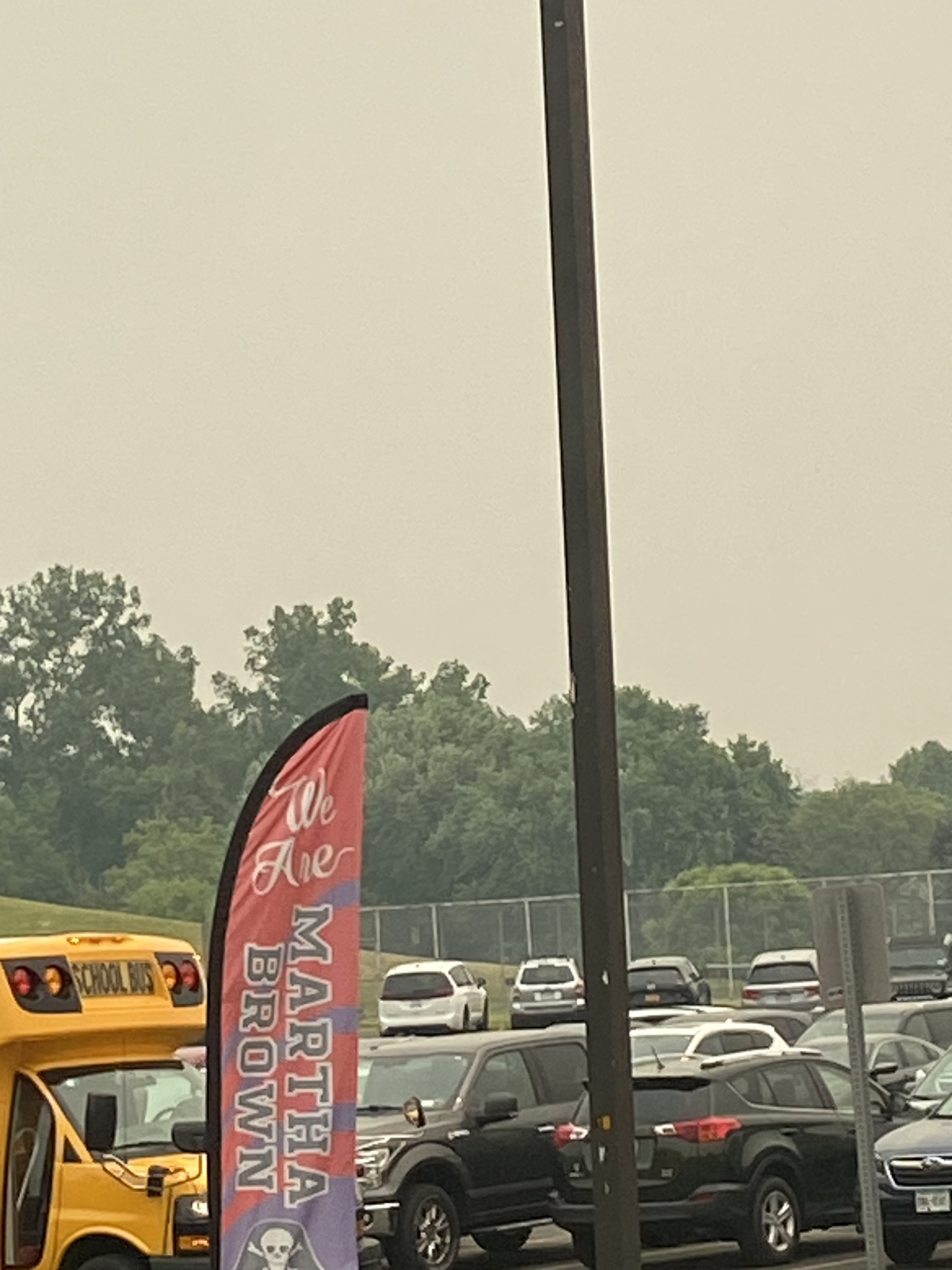
The parking lot of Martha Brown with the overblowing Canadian Wildfire smog.

- Martha Brown Middle School (6-8)

Principal: Rebecca Short(2022-)

Asst. Principal: George Barberi(2022-)
The Ayrault Road Martha Brown School opened in 1965 as a junior high school and is named after longtime Fairport teacher Martha A. Brown. The original Martha Brown School was located in the former West Avenue School, which was renamed in her honor in 1959.

=== High schools ===
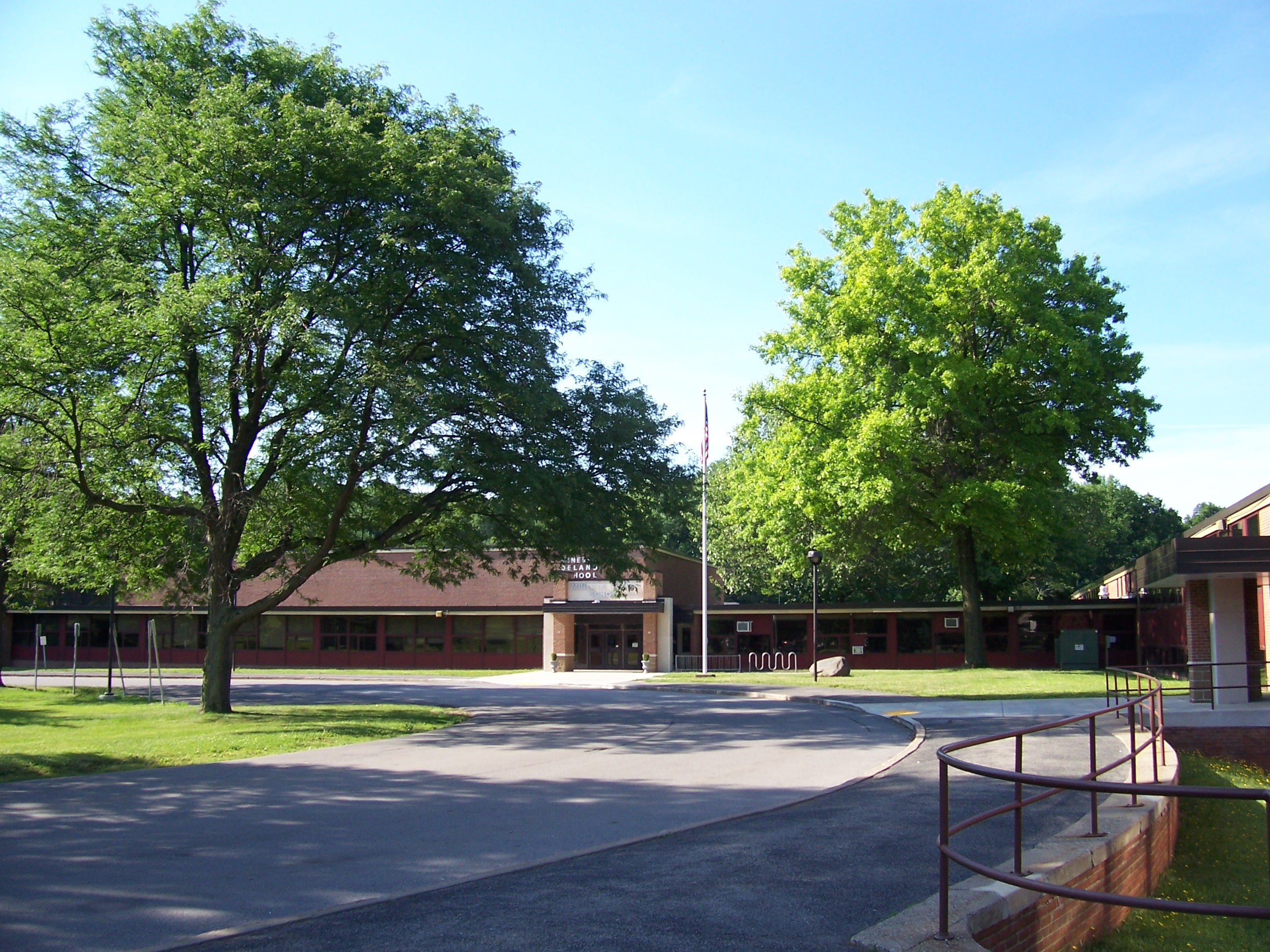
Minerva DeLand High School

- Minerva DeLand School (9)

Principal: Dominic Monacelli

Assistant Principal: Madison Shepard

DeLand High School opened in 1959 as the district's high school and is named after the longtime principal of the former Fairport High School on West Avenue.

- Fairport High School (10-12)

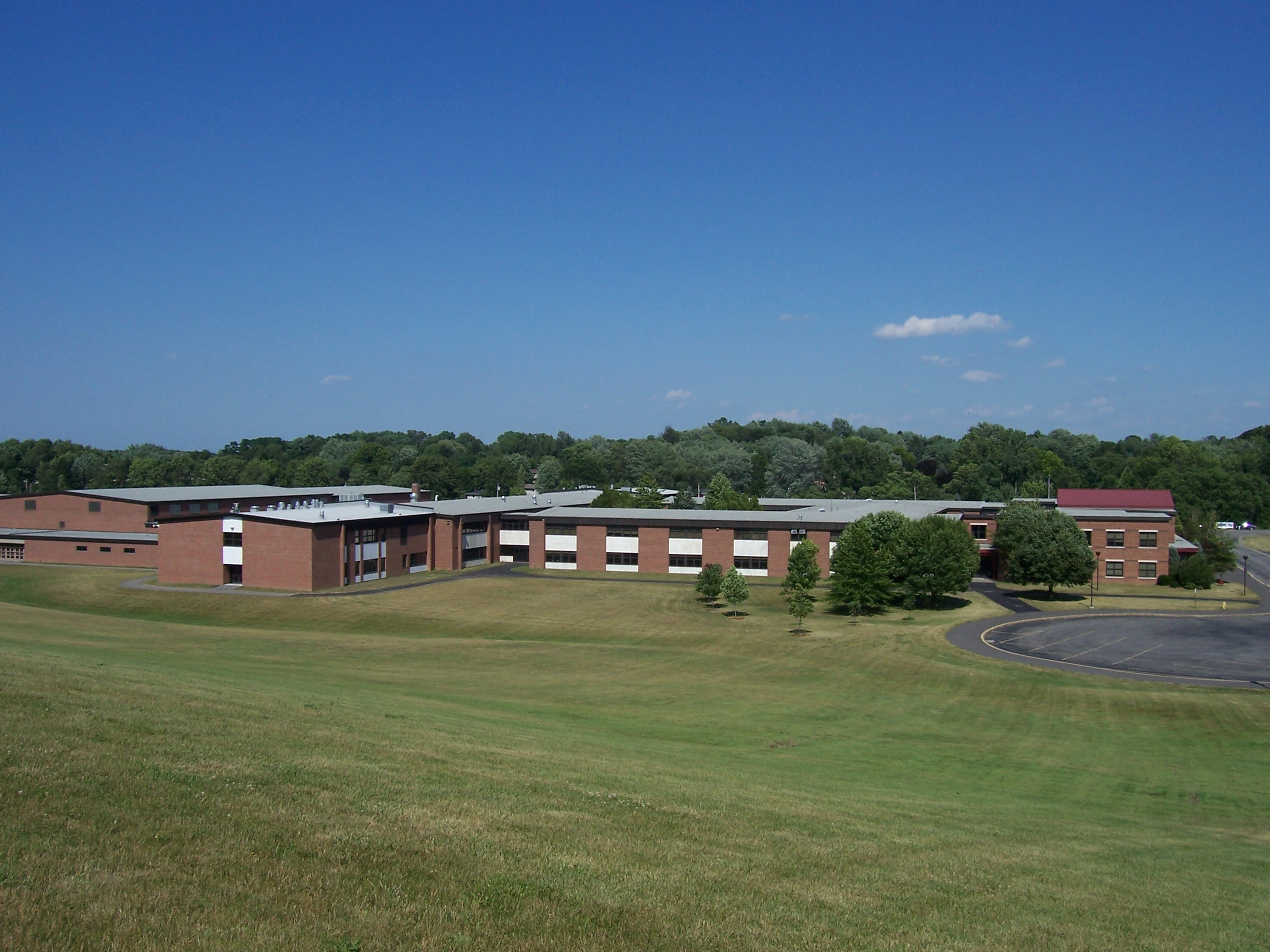
Fairport High School looking east

Principal: Robert Clark

Assistant Principals:

Assistant Principal: Madison Shepard

Red House: Ryan Kuhn

White House: Lyndsey Keil

Blue House: Ashley Edwards

Fairport High School opened in 1970, partially replacing Minerva DeLand, which educates the district's ninth grade students.

=== School photographs ===
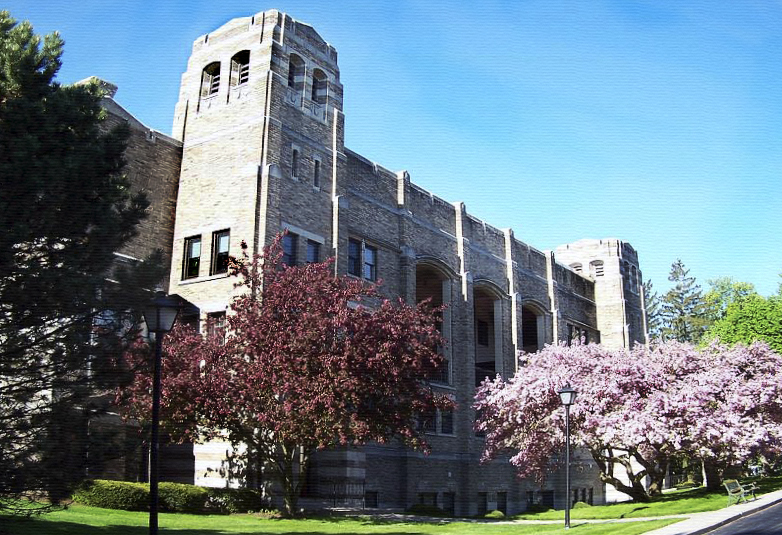
Old Fairport High School

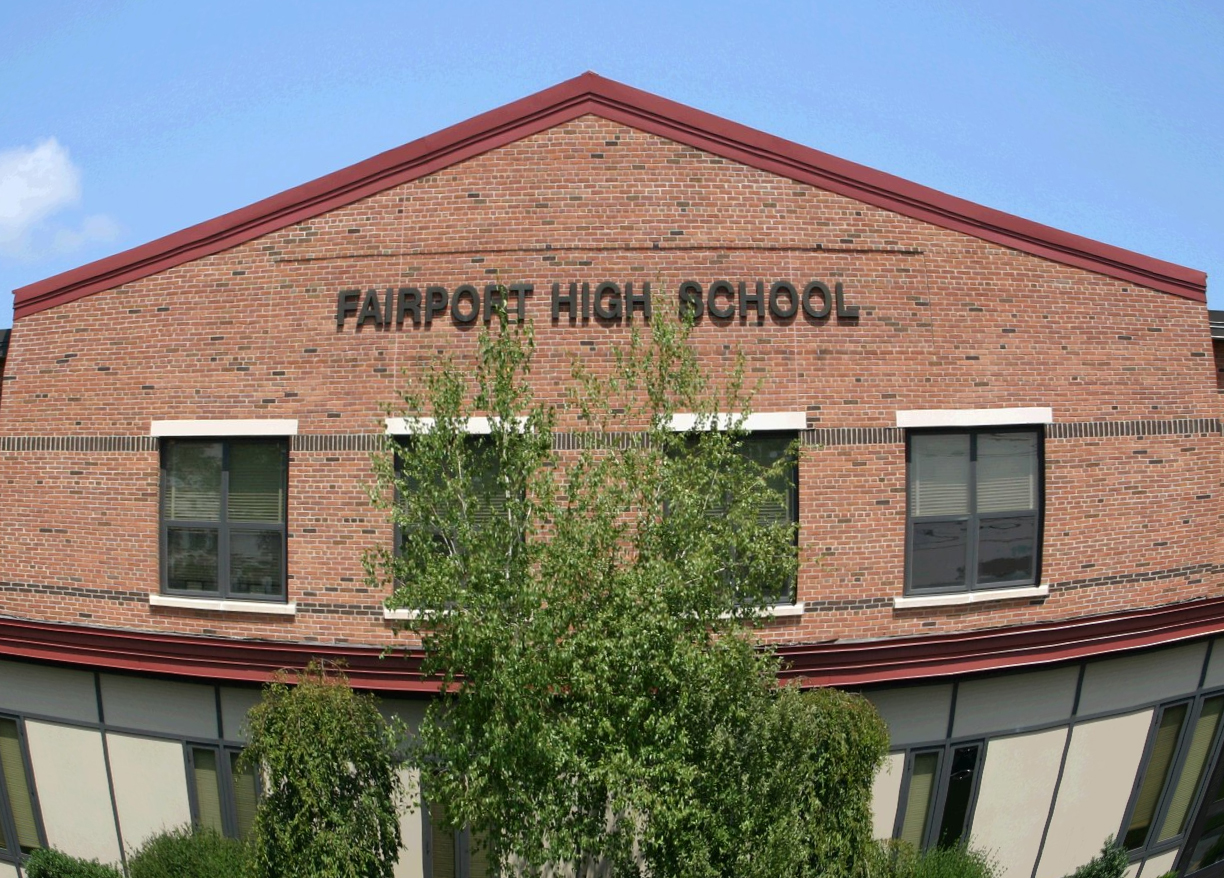
Fairport High School

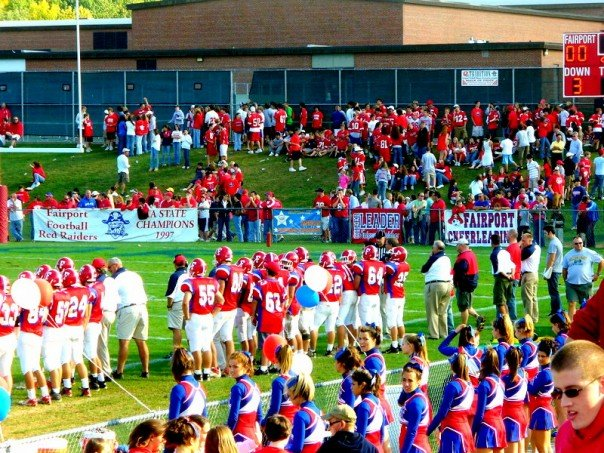
Fairport Homecoming
