= Joseph Fornieri =

American historian

Joseph R. Fornieri (born June 27, 1965) is an American political historian and Professor of Political Science at the Rochester Institute of Technology. He is an expert on the political ideology of Abraham Lincoln.

Although Fornieri is primarily professionally focused on Lincoln, his works often contain echoes of ancient Greek society, Christian values, and allusions to significant Rochester figures (such as Susan B. Anthony and Frederick Douglass).

== Life and career ==
=== Education ===
He is a 1987 graduate of SUNY Geneseo.

=== Academic career ===
He is the author/editor of numerous articles and four books on the 16th President, including "Abraham Lincoln, Philosopher Statseman" (2014), "The Language of Liberty: The Political Speeches and Writings of Abraham Lincoln" (2008), and "Abraham Lincoln’s Political Faith" (2005). He has also co-edited, with Dr. Kenneth Deutsch, "An Invitation to Political Thought" (2007), an introductory college text on western political thought.

In 2004, he was awarded the Eisenhart Award for Outstanding Teaching for Junior Faculty In 2005, he was presented the Eisenhart Provost's Award for Excellence in Teaching. In 2009, he was awarded a Fulbright Fellowship to teach "First Amendment and American Political Thought" in Prague, Czech Republic In 2010, he was presented the Eisenhart Award for Outstanding Teaching for Tenured Faculty.

=== 1619 Project Criticism ===
Fornieri is a critic of the New New York Times 1619 Project, described by the National Association of Scholars as part of "the brigade of historical luminaries who have rallied the opposition to The 1619 Project."

=== Personal life ===
He resides in Fairport, New York. Fornieri is a member of the classic rock and blues band, "The Fornieri Brother's."

== Books ==
- Fornieri, J. R. (2014). Abraham Lincoln: Philosopher Statesman. 248 pages. Southern Illinois University Press. {https://quod.lib.umich.edu/j/jala/2629860.0036.106/--abraham-lincoln-philosopher-statesman?rgn=main;view=fulltext]
- Fornieri, J. R. (2003). Abraham Lincoln's Political Faith. 218 pages. Northern Illinois University Press.
- Deutsch, K. L. and Fornieri, J. R. (2005). Lincoln's American Dream: Clashing Political Perspectives. Potomac Books.
- Fornieri, J.R. (2003). The Language of Liberty: the Political Speeches and Writings of Abraham Lincoln / Edited by Joseph R. Fornieri. 824 pages. Regnery Publishing, Inc.
