= Henry DeLand House =

Historic house in New York, United States

- U.S. National Register of Historic Places
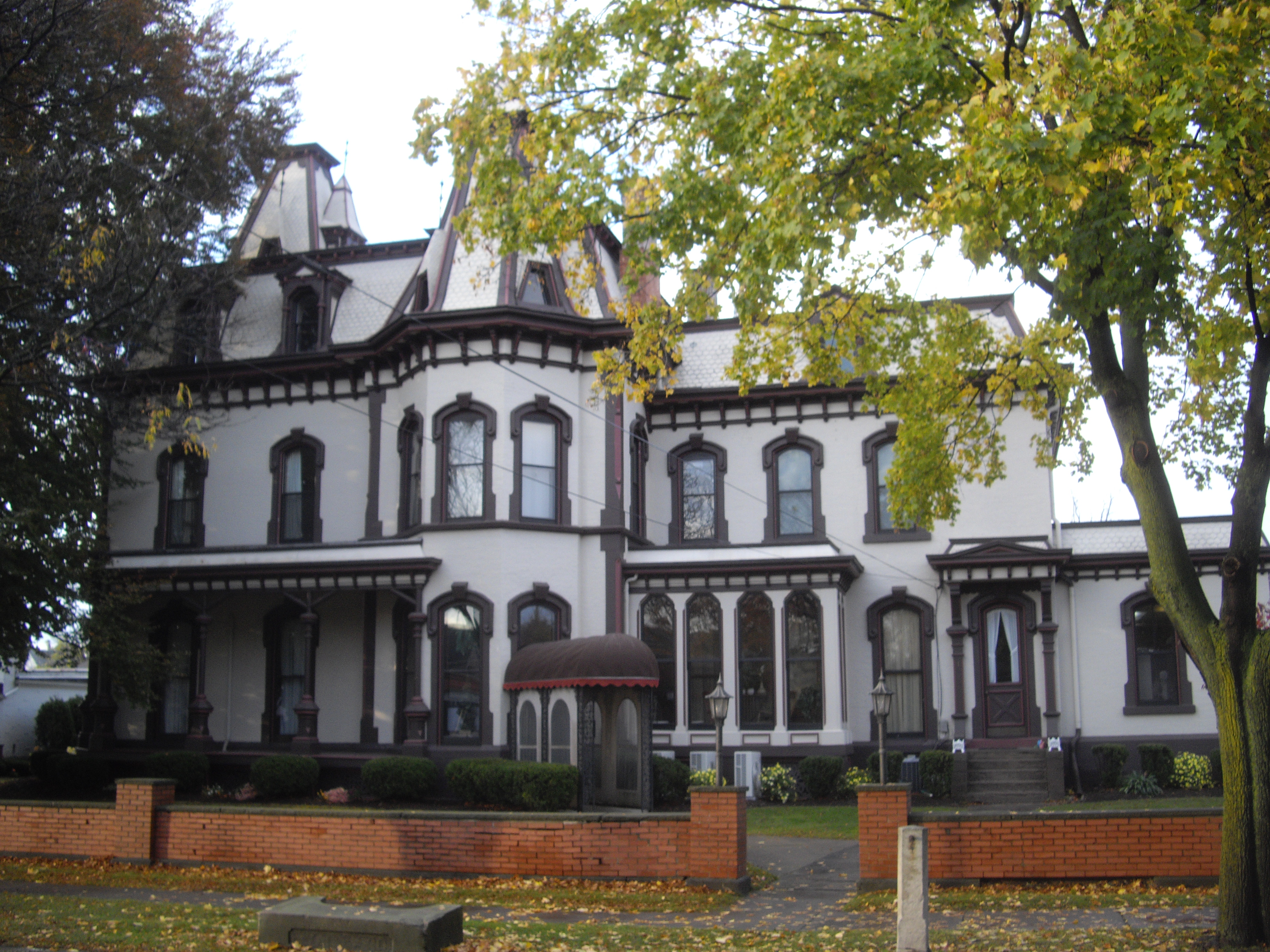

- Location within New York Location within the United States
- Location: Fairport, New York
- Coordinates: 43°5′55″N 77°26′31″W
- Built: 1874-76
- Architect: John Thomas
- Architectural style: Second Empire
- NRHP reference No.: 80004610
- Added to NRHP: April 17, 1980

The Henry DeLand House also known as the Green Lantern Inn was built from 1874 to 1876 in the village of Fairport, New York as a home for Henry Addison DeLand. DeLand was a member of an influential local family and was a baking soda manufacturer. It is located at 1 East Church Street, at the intersection of South Main street.

== Description ==
The painted brick Second Empire building has wood porches and a tin plated steel roof. It contains 4 Italian marble fireplaces and 2 slate fireplaces, painted to look like marble. It was one of the first houses in the region to have indoor plumbing, including a rainwater cistern.

== History ==
DeLand lost his fortune and the house covering orange crop losses for his Florida farmers. In 1905, the new owners installed stained glass windows, electric chandeliers and glass lanterns at the four doors. After 1920, it became known for a while as Villa Rosenborg due to its Danish owners. In 1920, it was slated to be torn down to provide space for a new trolley station, but the trolley line was rerouted saving the house. It became the Green Lantern Inn in 1925 under new owners who eventually added a restaurant. During Prohibition, alcohol was available in a hidden speakeasy loft. After the repeal of Prohibition, they opened an official taproom.

Henry DeLand House in Fairport, New York, 1900

A decade long restoration project began in 1976. From 1980 to 2005, it was owned by Terrence O'Neil, Vice Chairman of the Fairport Savings Bank. In 2006, it hosted a fundraiser for the Rochester Philharmonic Orchestra which had 30 different designers improving the house.

Mr. Dominic's Italian restaurant currently operates in the building.
