= Henry Addison DeLand =

American businessman

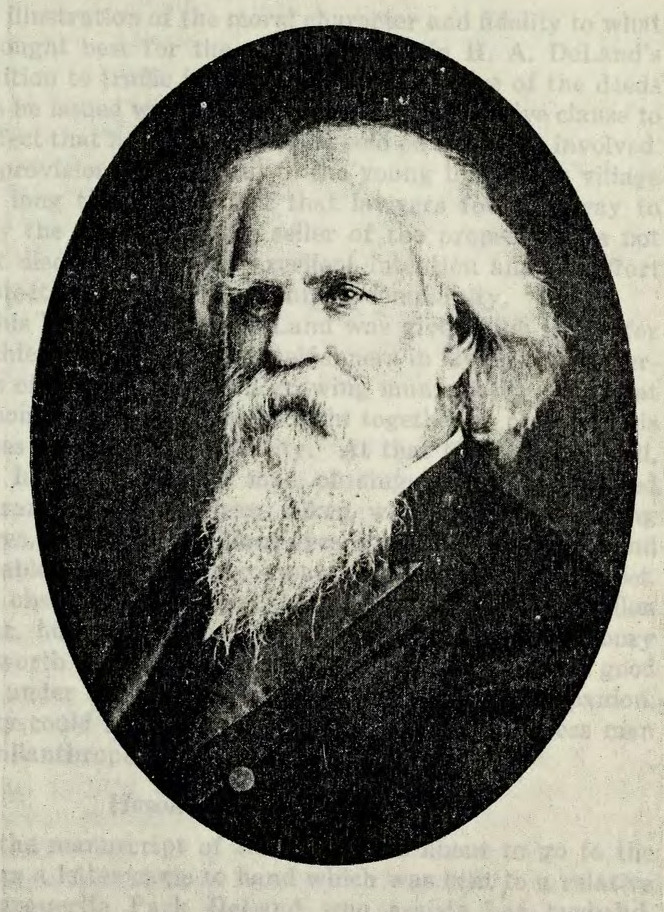
- Born: October 25, 1834; Newark Valley
- Died: March 13, 1908 (aged 73); Fairport

Henry Addison DeLand (October 25, 1834 — March 13, 1908) was an American baking soda manufacturer from Fairport, New York, US and founder of DeLand, Florida and Stetson University.

Henry Addison DeLand was born in Newark Valley, Tioga, New York, to parents Electra Tracy and Levi DeLand.

DeLand first visited Persimmon Hollow, Florida, in March 1876. The community where his brother-in-law, O.P. Terry had purchased property to raise oranges intrigued him. So did the name chosen thus for the persimmon trees abundant in the area. On DeLand's first visit to the hollow, he and his brother-in-law traveled from the north by rail to Jacksonville, then took a steamboat south on the St. Johns River to Enterprise. As their rig headed to the hollow, DeLand was unenthusiastic during his bumpy ride from Enterprise. As the flat terrain transitioned from swamp to rolling acreage it was reported that DeLand exclaimed, "This looks like the West. Here is snap and push. I am willing to go on." And he did.

High noon, February 8, 1882, the town known as Persimmon Hollow, Florida, was incorporated by a unanimous vote of its 23 townspeople. Persimmon Hollow's name change took place after the generous donation of acreage for a school, church, and main thoroughfare by DeLand. DeLand took great interest and pride in his new Florida enterprise and intended to make it the Athens of Florida as he dubbed it. DeLand founded the DeLand Academy which soon became known as John B. Stetson University, after he persuaded a friend, the millionaire hat maker John B. Stetson, to come to DeLand and invest in the institution.

During the "big freeze" of 1894-95, Henry DeLand lost nearly US$250,000 due to the cold. Additionally, he had promised that he would cover anyone who moved to the area and planted oranges against loss of their crop to a freeze. But as time passed, the city he founded continued to develop and thrive. It has remained the county seat of Volusia County since 1887, and in 2020 had an estimated population of around 37,000.

Henry Addison DeLand married Sarah Parce and had 3 children. He died on 13 March 1908 in Fairport, New York.
