= Fairport, New York =

Village in Perinton, New York, US

- Village
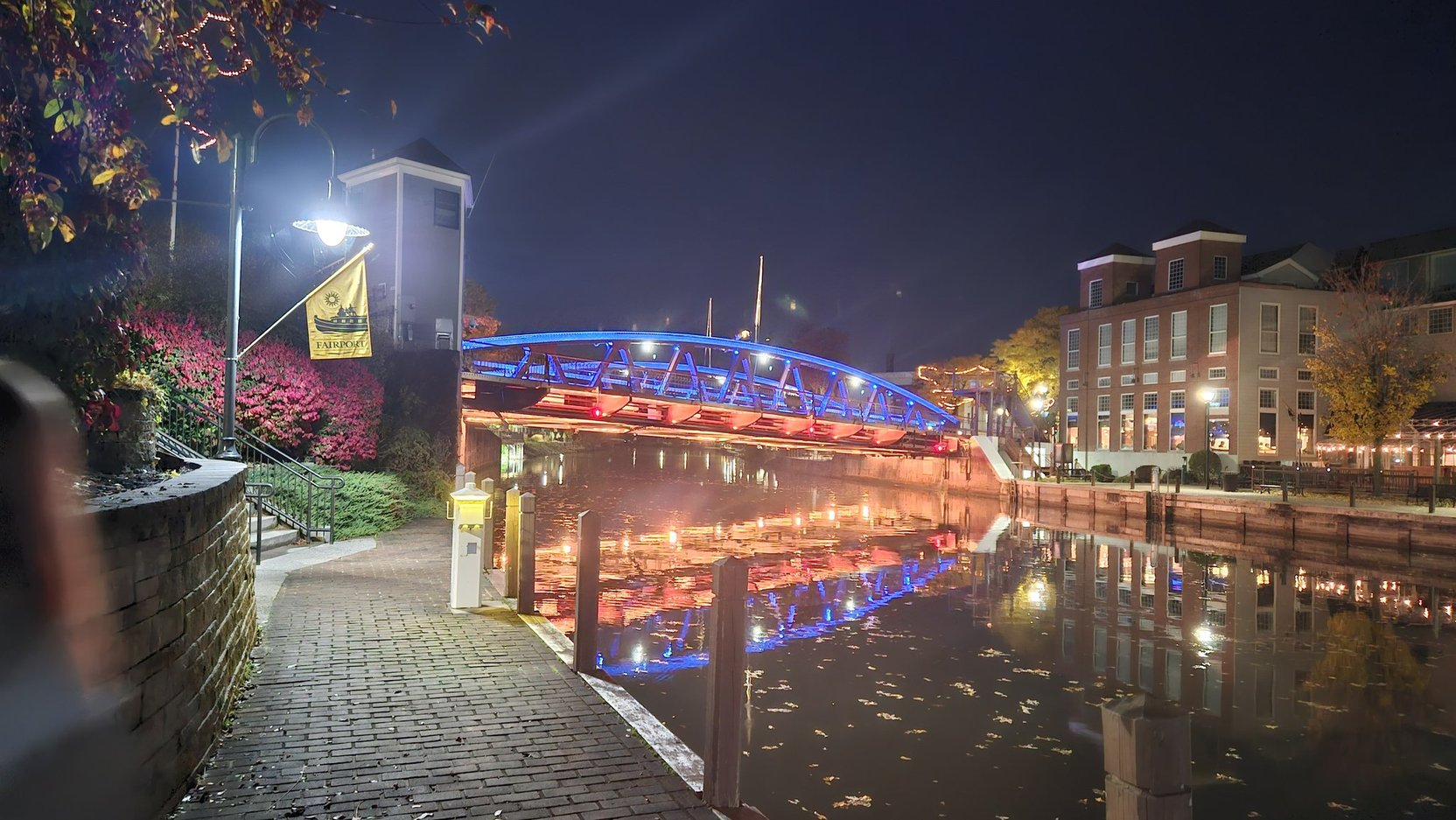
- Fairport at night

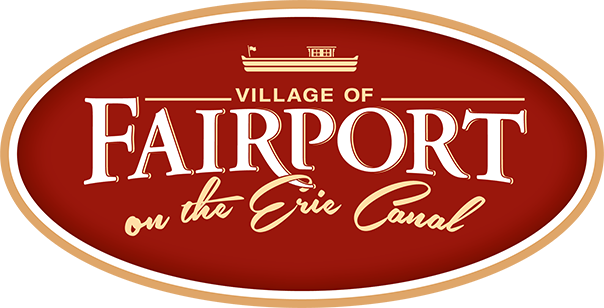
- Logo

- Location in Monroe County and the state of New York

- Location of New York in the United States
- Coordinates: 43°05′58″N 77°26′35″W
- Country: United States
- State: New York
- County: Monroe
- Town: Perinton
- Incorporated: 1867; 159 years ago

Government
  - Mayor: Julie Domaratz

Area
  - Total: 1.62 sq mi (4.19 km^{2})
  - Land: 1.58 sq mi (4.09 km^{2})
  - Water: 0.039 sq mi (0.10 km^{2})
- Elevation: 474 ft (144 m)

Population (2020)
  - Total: 5,501
  - Density: 3,481.9/sq mi (1,344.36/km^{2})
- Time zone: UTC-5 (EST)
  - Summer (DST): UTC-4 (EDT)
- ZIP Code: 14450
- Area code: 585
- FIPS code: 36-25076
- Website: www.village.fairport.ny.us

Fairport is a village in the town of Perinton, part of Monroe County, New York, United States. Fairport is a suburb of Rochester and is known as the "crown jewel of the Erie Canal". The population of the village was 5,501 at the 2020 census.

== History ==
The town of Perinton was first settled in the two flat areas of Perinton Center (Turk Hill and Ayrault Roads) and Egypt. What was developed as the village of Fairport was a swampy area in the northern part of the town that was drained in the 1820s by construction of the new Erie Canal. With the opening of the canal, what was then known as Perrinsville quickly became a busy canal port with a reputation for being a "fair port".

A further boon to the area's reputation as an industry and transportation center came with the construction of railroads in 1853. This now booming section of Perrinsville was incorporated as a village on April 30, 1867, and eventually became the center of activity for the town of Perinton.

In the 19th century, industry moved into Fairport, including Deland Chemical (baking soda), Cobb Preserving (the predecessor to American Can), and the Trescott Company (fruit grading and packing systems). Deland Chemical later became Fairport Vinegar Works, makers of Certo brand pectin used to gel and preserve foodstuffs.

In the early 20th century, the Erie Canal was expanded and renamed the Barge Canal. (It reverted to its original name in 1992). Barge transportation rapidly declined as automobiles and trucks became popular. The town began to expand away from the canal. The Erie Canal is now used mainly for recreation.

Fairport acquired its name in the mid-19th century from a traveler on the Erie Canal who was overheard at Mallett's Tavern referring to the village as a fair port. Local legend has it that the same visitor vociferously complained the next morning that Millstone Block Hotel had bedbugs, and he stormed out of Fairport, never to be seen again. The name, however, stuck.

The First Baptist Church of Fairport, Wilbur House, Minerva and Daniel DeLand House, and Henry DeLand House are listed on the National Register of Historic Places.

== Geography ==
Fairport is in eastern Monroe County, in the northern part of the town of Perinton. It is 10 miles (16 km) southeast of downtown Rochester. New York State Route 31F passes through the village, leading west 2.5 miles (4.0 km) to East Rochester and east 9 miles (14 km) to Macedon. New York State Route 250 is Fairport's Main Street, continuing north 8 miles (13 km) to Webster and south 4 miles (6 km) to State Route 96 near the Victor town line.

According to the U.S. Census Bureau, the village of Fairport has a total area of 1.6 square miles (4.1 km^{2}), of which 0.04 square miles (0.10 km^{2}), or 2.29%, are water. The water area is largely contained in the Erie Canal.

Although officially the name of only the village, "Fairport" is often used to refer to a large portion of the encompassing town of Perinton as well. Both the Fairport Central School District and Fairport ZIP code area overlap closely with the borders of Perinton.

== Demographics ==
Historical population
Census	Pop.	Note	%±
1880	1,920		—
1890	2,552		32.9%
1900	2,489		−2.5%
1910	3,112		25.0%
1920	4,626		48.7%
1930	4,604		−0.5%
1940	4,644		0.9%
1950	5,267		13.4%
1960	5,507		4.6%
1970	6,474		17.6%
1980	5,970		−7.8%
1990	5,943		−0.5%
2000	5,740		−3.4%
2010	5,353		−6.7%
2020	5,501		2.8%
U.S. Decennial Census

=== 2020 census ===
As of the 2020 census, Fairport had a population of 5,501. The median age was 45.4 years. 18.2% of residents were under the age of 18 and 22.4% of residents were 65 years of age or older. For every 100 females there were 92.9 males, and for every 100 females age 18 and over there were 90.1 males age 18 and over.

All of its residents lived in urban areas, while none lived in rural areas.

There were 2,501 households in Fairport, of which 24.2% had children under the age of 18 living in them. Of all households, 46.4% were married-couple households, 17.7% were households with a male householder and no spouse or partner present, and 29.0% were households with a female householder and no spouse or partner present. About 33.6% of all households were made up of individuals and 14.0% had someone living alone who was 65 years of age or older.

There were 2,637 housing units, of which 5.2% were vacant. The homeowner vacancy rate was 0.7% and the rental vacancy rate was 5.1%.

Racial composition as of the 2020 census
Race	Number	Percent
White	4,864	88.4%
Black or African American	131	2.4%
American Indian and Alaska Native	7	0.1%
Asian	96	1.7%
Native Hawaiian and Other Pacific Islander	2	0.0%
Some other race	47	0.9%
Two or more races	354	6.4%
Hispanic or Latino (of any race)	178	3.2%

=== 2000 census ===
As of the census of 2000, there were 5,740 people, 2,369 households, and 1,594 families residing in the village. The population density was 3,645.0 inhabitants per square mile (1,407.3/km^{2}). There were 2,431 housing units at an average density of 1,543.7 per square mile (596.0/km^{2}). The racial makeup of the village was 96.99% White, 0.73% African American, 0.12% Native American, 1.03% Asian, 0.00% Pacific Islander, 0.21% from other races, and 0.92% from two or more races. 1.38% of the population were Hispanic or Latino of any race.

There were 2,369 households, of which 33.2% had children under the age of 18, 53.4% were married couples living together, 10.7% had a female householder with no husband present, and 32.7% were non-families. 27.0% of all households were made up of individuals, and 7.9% had someone living alone who was 65 years of age or older. The average household size was 2.42 and the average family size was 2.96.

In the village, the population was diverse, with 25.2% under the age of 18, 6.1% from 18 to 24, 31.8% from 25 to 44, 25.1% from 45 to 64, and 11.8% who were 65 years of age or older. The median age was 38 years. For every 100 females, there were 92.4 males. For every 100 females age 18 and over, there were 91.1 males.

The median income for a household in the village was $53,375 and the median income for a family was $65,980. Males had a median income of $50,094 v. $30,431 for females. The per capita income for the village was $29,390. 3.3% of the population and 1.7% of families were below the poverty line. 2.2% of those under the age of 18 and 5.1% of those 65 and older were living below the poverty line.

== Arts and culture ==
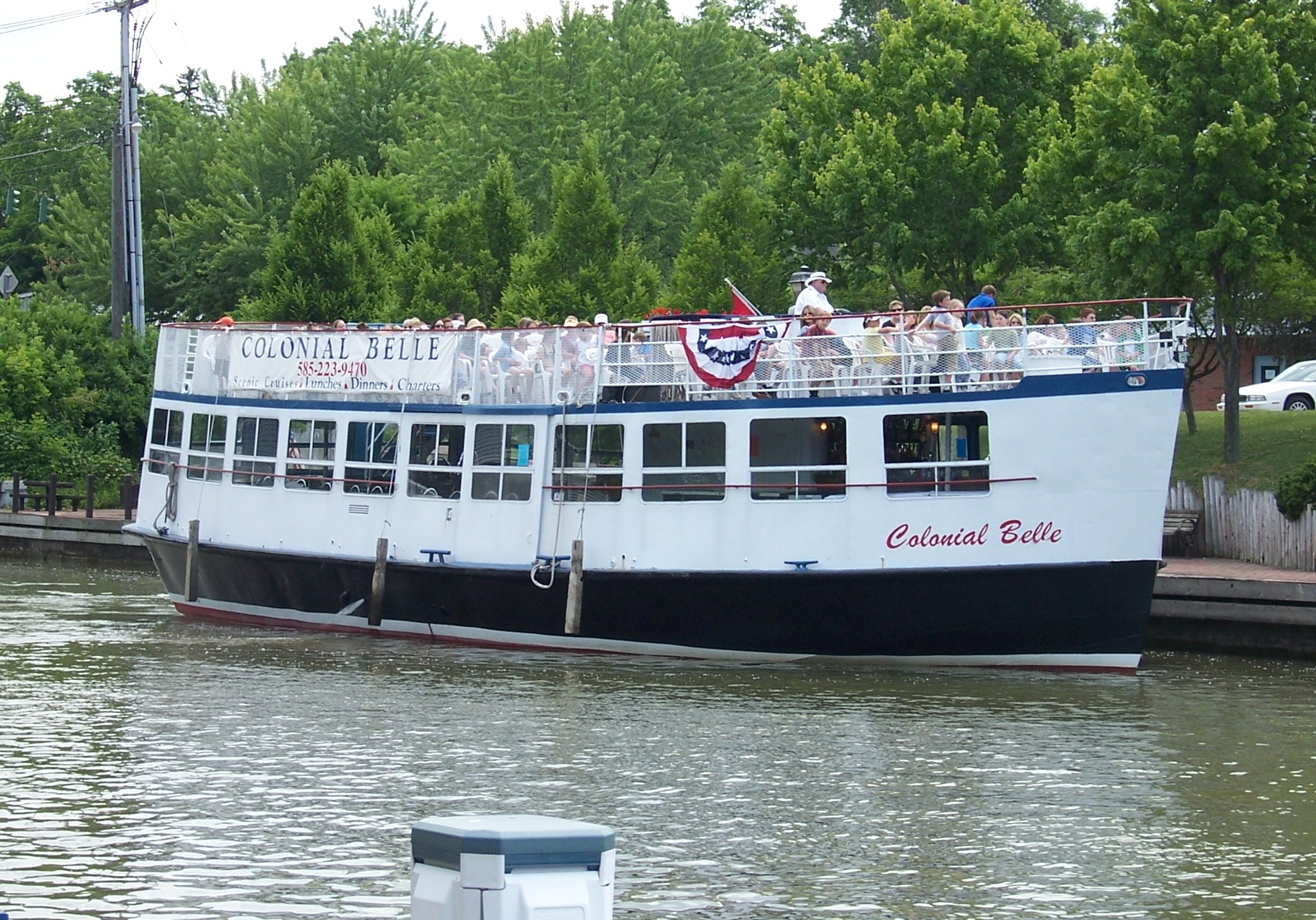
The Colonial Belle, a canal tour boat

- The Fairport Village Landing, opened in 1977, and Packett's Landing, built in the early 1980s, are two of the main shopping, dining and gathering spots in the village.
- The Colonial Belle is a popular tour boat that offers canal cruises from Packett's Wharf on the Erie Canal in downtown Fairport.
- Fairport Canal Days is an annual event featuring artists and performers.
- Each Tuesday during the summer the village hosts live entertainment.
- The Fairport Music and Food Festival occurs annually.

== Parks and recreation ==
- Kennelley Park
- Perinton Park
- Packett's Landing Wharf
- Potter Park
- Indian Hill Trail
- Perinton Park is located on the banks of Erie Canal. There is a rowing boathouse nearby, which holds a "Lift Bridge Regatta".
- The Erie Canal towpath is a walking/biking path.

== Government ==
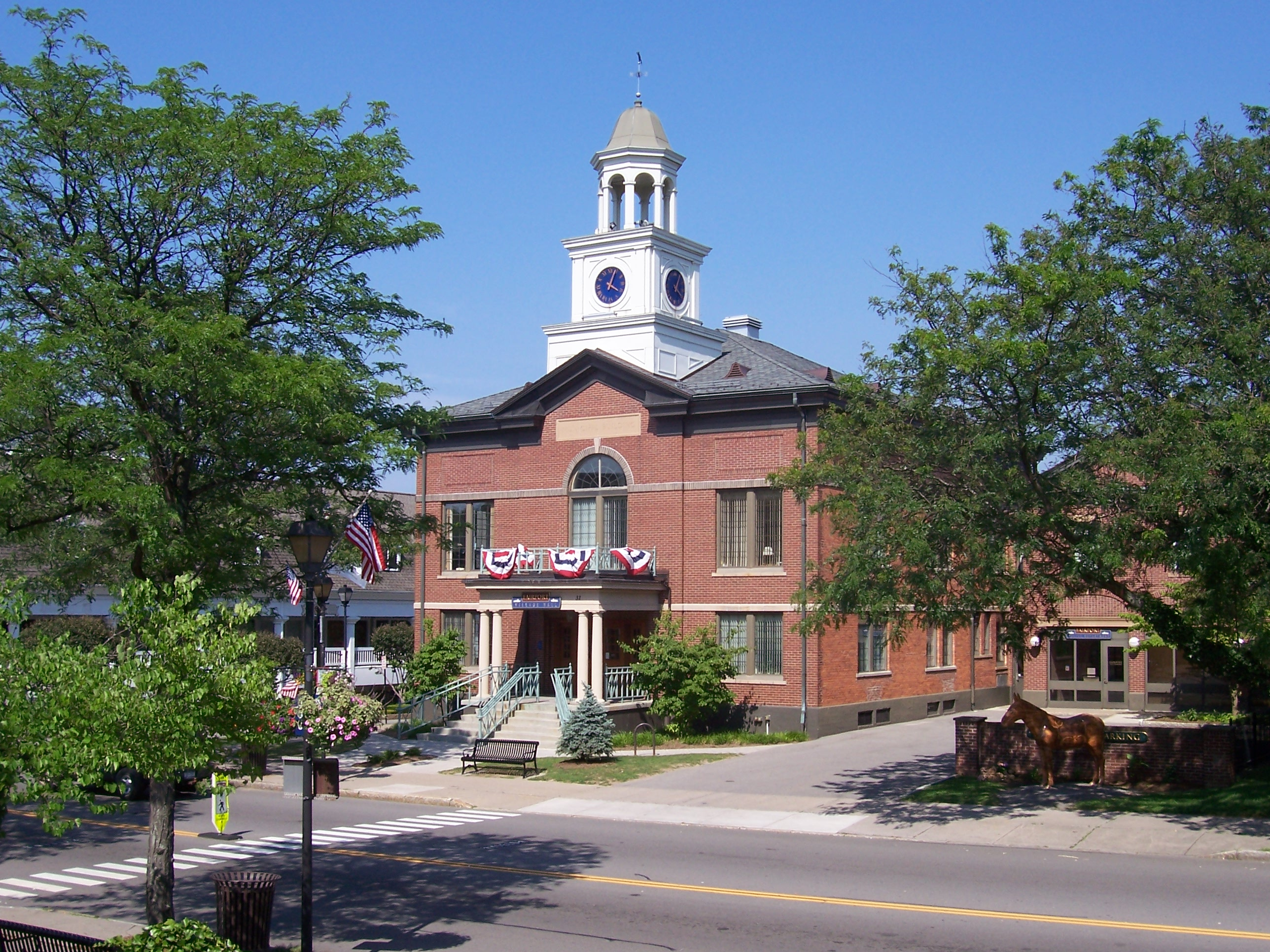
Fairport village hall

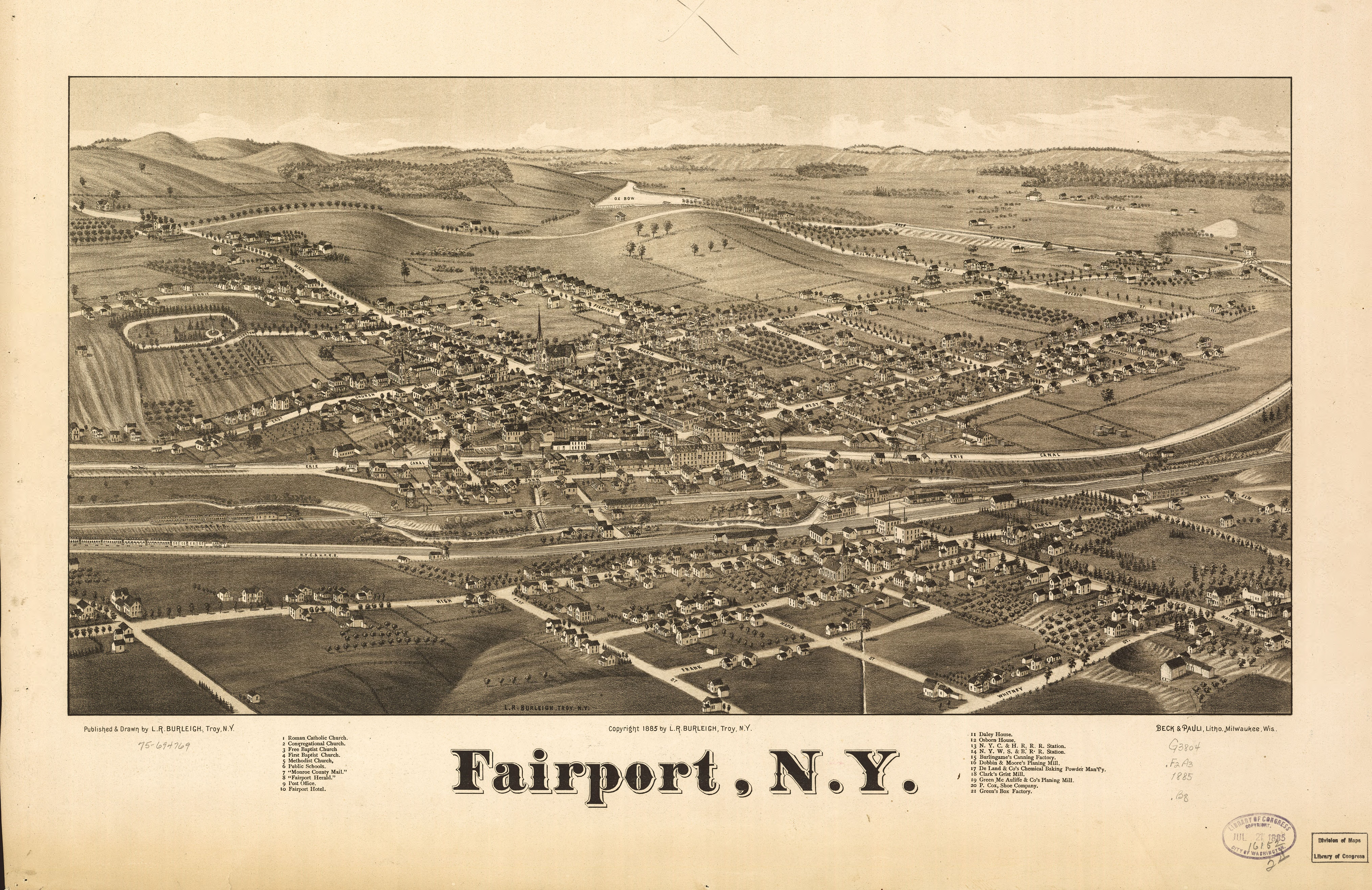
Perspective map of Fairport with list of landmarks from 1885 by L.R. Burleigh

The Village Board is the local legislative body, consisting of the Mayor and four Trustees. Board members are elected in the November general elections and serve a term of four years.

The Village Board selects a Village Administrator with responsibility for directing Village operations, including those of the Fairport Municipal Commission and for serving as budget director, zoning officer and public safety officer.

Serving under the Village Administrator and appointed by the mayor with Board of Trustees approval, are the clerk/treasurer, deputy clerk, deputy treasurer and building inspector/fire marshal.

== Education ==
Fairport Central School District oversee public education. Schools in Fairport include elementary schools Brooks Hill, Jefferson Avenue and Northside Dudley, middle schools Johanna Perrin and Martha Brown, and high schools Minerva Deland and Fairport High School.

== Infrastructure ==
Fairport owns and operates a municipal power corporation, Fairport Electric. Incorporated in 1901, Fairport Electric provides electric power to its customers at lower rates than those charged by neighboring utilities. Fairport Electric has purchased power from the New York Power Authority since 1961.

== Notable people ==
- Cole Bardreau, NHL hockey player, New York Islanders
- Rick Beato, musician, producer and YouTube personality
- Brian Michael Bendis, comic book writer; spent summers in Fairport
- Ralph Bown, radio pioneer
- Natalie Buchbinder, PWHL hockey player, Minnesota Frost
- Paul Foster Case, occultist
- Don Davey, NFL football player, Green Bay Packers (1991–94), Jacksonville Jaguars (1995–97)
- Henry A. DeLand, founder of Stetson University in DeLand, Florida
- Andrea Nix Fine, documentary film maker; 2013 Academy Award winner (Inocente)
- Joseph Fornieri, historian and author
- Philip Seymour Hoffman, actor; 2006 Academy Award winner (Capote)
- Vijay Iyer, jazz pianist
- Noah Z. Jones, animator and creator of Fish Hooks
- Leo Lyons, owner-manager of the Rochester Jeffersons founding NFL team (1920–25)
- Joe Manhertz, former St. Bonaventure University athletic director
- Julia Nunes, singer-songwriter
- Lauren O'Connell, singer-songwriter, guitarist
- Kim Pegula, businesswoman and co-owner of the Buffalo Bills
- Sian Proctor, scientist, astronaut and TV personality; 1988 graduate of FHS
- Louise Slaughter, former U.S. congresswoman
- Tim Soudan, professional lacrosse player
- Kiara Zanon, PWHL hockey player, Toronto Scepters
