= Hopkins House =

Hopkins House may refer to:

== United Kingdom ==
- Hopkins House (Hampstead), a Hi-tech house created in 1976 by Michael Hopkins and Partners

== United States ==
- Hopkins House (Milton, Delaware), listed on the NRHP in Sussex County, Delaware
- John M. Hopkins Cabin, Folkston, Georgia, listed on the NRHP in Charlton County, Georgia
- William Hopkins House, Soda Springs, Idaho, listed on the NRHP in Caribou County, Idaho
- Hopkins House (Tecumseh, Kansas), NRHP-listed
- Hopkins House (North Middletown, Kentucky), listed on the National Register of Historic Places in Bourbon County, Kentucky
- Hopkins House (Marion, Louisiana), listed on the NRHP in Union Parish, Louisiana
- Elisha Hopkins House, Somerville, Massachusetts, NRHP-listed
- Hopkins House (Lockport, New York), NRHP-listed
- Hopkins Cottage, Saranac Lake, New York, NRHP-listed
- Roswell Hopkins Residence, Ghent, Ohio, listed on the NRHP in Summit County, Ohio
- Hopkins Sandstone House and Farmstead, Ripley, Oklahoma, listed on the NRHP in Payne County, Oklahoma
- Esek Hopkins House, Providence, Rhode Island, NRHP-listed
- Gov. Stephen Hopkins House, Providence, Rhode Island, NRHP-listed
- Lander-Hopkins House, Victoria, Texas, listed on the NRHP in Victoria County, Texas
- Willis Hopkins House, Wauwatosa, Wisconsin, listed on the NRHP in Milwaukee County, Wisconsin
- Hopkins House (Boston College)

== See also ==
- Hopkins Farm (disambiguation)
