= National Register of Historic Places listings in Union Parish, Louisiana =

Location of Union Parish in Louisiana

This is a list of the National Register of Historic Places listings in Union Parish, Louisiana.

This is intended to be a complete list of the properties on the National Register of Historic Places in Union Parish, Louisiana, United States. The locations of National Register properties for which the latitude and longitude coordinates are included below, may be seen in a map.

There are 12 properties listed on the National Register in the parish.

This National Park Service list is complete through NPS recent listings posted October 30, 2026.

== Current listings ==
	Name on the Register	Image	Date listed	Location	City or town	Description
1	Alabama Methodist Church	Alabama Methodist Church	March 30, 1995 (#95000298)	Alternate Louisiana Highway 2; 32°51′35″N 92°43′31″W	Bernice vicinity	
2	Bernice Civic Clubhouse	Bernice Civic Clubhouse	April 21, 1994 (#94000374)	Louisiana Highway 2; 32°49′17″N 92°39′05″W	Bernice	
3	Dual State Monument	Dual State Monument	September 11, 2000 (#99001354)	Union County Road 86; 33°00′39″N 92°22′05″W	Marion vicinity	Extends into Union County, Arkansas
4	Edgewood	Edgewood	October 8, 1980 (#80001765)	1 mile west of Farmerville on the Bernice Highway; 32°47′12″N 92°25′30″W	Farmerville vicinity	
5	Garland House	Garland House	January 7, 1994 (#93001495)	701 Cherry St. 32°49′03″N 92°39′27″W	Bernice	
6	J.W. Heard House	J.W. Heard House	January 7, 1994 (#93001494)	605 Cherry St. 32°49′05″N 92°39′28″W	Bernice	
7	Hopkins House	Hopkins House	March 14, 1983 (#83000549)	Hopkins Lane; 32°54′10″N 92°14′25″W	Marion	
8	Lindsey Bonded Warehouses	Lindsey Bonded Warehouses	July 15, 1999 (#99000836)	Holly and 2nd Sts. 32°49′28″N 92°39′18″W	Bernice	
9	Marion Rosenwald School		November 5, 2026 (#100013579)	3062 Taylor Street; 32°54′16″N 92°14′32″W	Marion	
10	R.T. Moore House	R.T. Moore House	May 19, 1994 (#94000478)	Northern side of Alternate Louisiana Highway 2, about 2 miles west of U.S. Route 167; 32°50′40″N 92°40′52″W	Bernice vicinity	
11	Daniel Stein House	Daniel Stein House	June 23, 1988 (#88000899)	208 W. Bayou; 32°46′31″N 92°24′29″W	Farmerville	
12	Dr. Terral Clinic	Dr. Terral Clinic	August 20, 1999 (#99001015)	107 N. Washington St. 32°46′27″N 92°24′16″W	Farmerville	

== See also ==
- List of National Historic Landmarks in Louisiana
- National Register of Historic Places listings in Louisiana
