= National Register of Historic Places listings in Charlton County, Georgia =

This is a list of properties and districts in Charlton County, Georgia that are listed on the United States National Register of Historic Places (NRHP).

This National Park Service list is complete through NPS recent listings posted March 21, 2025.

== Current listings ==
	Name on the Register	Image	Date listed	Location	City or town	Description
1	Charlton County Courthouse	Charlton County Courthouse	September 18, 1980 (#80000987)	Off GA 40; 30°49′55″N 82°00′17″W	Folkston	
2	Floyds Island Hammock		April 21, 2000 (#00000389)	Okefenokee National Wildlife Refuge; 30°51′25″N 82°16′01″W	Folkston	Deep inside the swamp. Also called Hebard Cabin and Floyd's cabin.
3	John M. Hopkins Cabin	John M. Hopkins Cabin	March 4, 1983 (#83000186)	SW of Folkston, off GA 121/23; 30°44′19″N 82°07′41″W	Folkston	Inside the Okefenokee National Wildlife Refuge
4	William Mizell Sr. House	William Mizell Sr. House	September 4, 1997 (#97001089)	101 Palm St. (now named Garden St.); 30°50′02″N 82°00′28″W	Folkston	
