= Hopkins Farm =

Hopkins Farm may refer to:

- Hopkins Farm (Cherry Hills Village, Colorado)
- Hopkins Farm (Pittsford, New York)
- Hopkins Farm (Simpsonville, South Carolina), a National Register of Historic Places listingin Greenville County, South Carolina

== See also ==
- Hopkins Covered Bridge Farm, Lewes, Delaware, a National Register of Historic Places listing in Sussex County, Delaware
- Rider–Hopkins Farm and Olmsted Camp, Sardinia, New York
- Hopkins Sandstone House and Farmstead, Ripley, Oklahoma, a National Register of Historic Places listing in Payne County, Oklahoma
- Hopkins House (disambiguation)
