= Dual State Monument =

Monument on the Arkansas-Louisiana border in the United States

- U.S. National Register of Historic Places
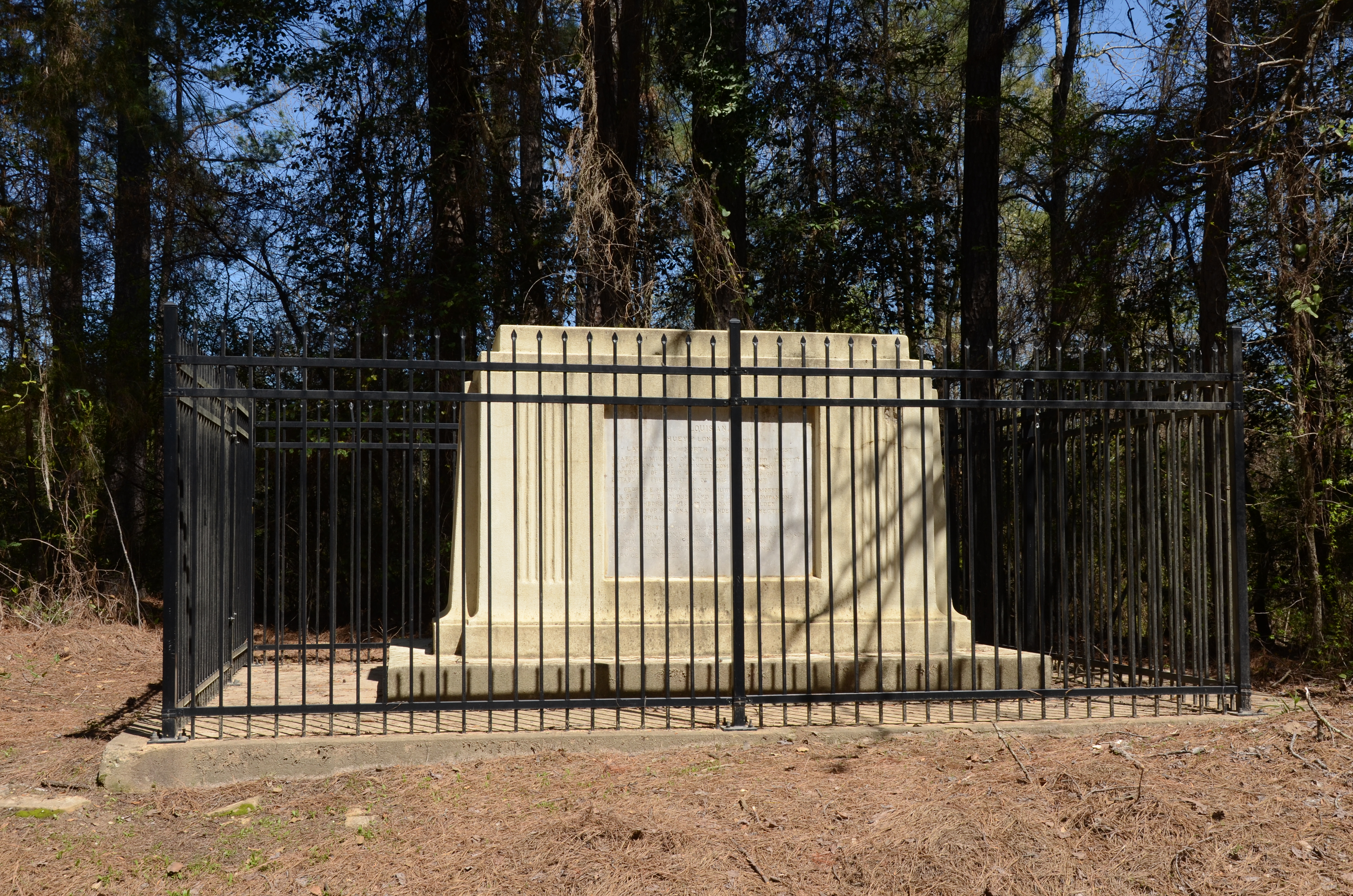

- Location within Arkansas Location within the United States
- Nearest city: Aurelle, Arkansas
- Coordinates: 33°0′39″N 92°22′5″W
- Area: less than one acre
- Built: 1931
- Architectural style: Art Deco
- NRHP reference No.: 99001354
- Added to NRHP: September 11, 2000

The Dual State Monument is a monument located on the border of Union County, Arkansas, and Union Parish, Louisiana. The monument was built in 1931 to mark the centennial of the establishment of the Arkansas-Louisiana state line. It also marks the birthplace of Arkansas governor George Washington Donaghey, who commissioned the monument after his retirement. The monument features Art Deco bas-relief carvings on its east and west sides. The east side features popular modes of transportation in 1831, including a steamboat, stagecoach, and covered wagon. The west side displays a locomotive, automobile, and airplane to represent the modes of transportation common in 1931. The monument was the first Art Deco-inspired sculpture erected in Arkansas.

The monument was added to the National Register of Historic Places on September 11, 2000.

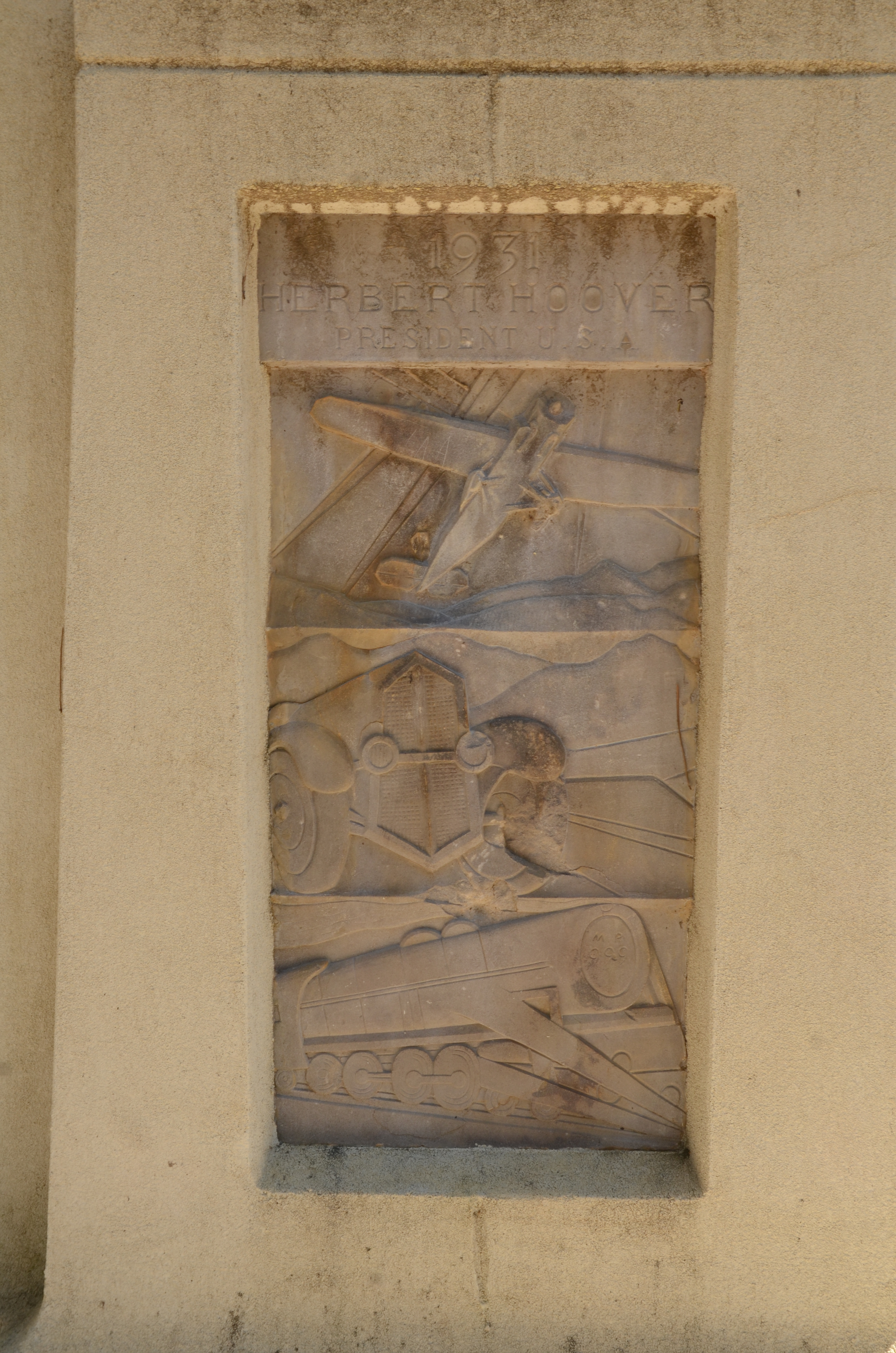
At Dual State Monument, bas-relief tribute to modes of transportation

== See also ==
- International Boundary Marker: monument on the Louisiana-Texas border
- OKKAMO Tri-State Marker: monument on the Arkansas-Missouri-Oklahoma tripoint
- United States Highway 61 Arch: monument on the Arkansas-Missouri border
- National Register of Historic Places listings in Union County, Arkansas
- National Register of Historic Places listings in Union Parish, Louisiana
