= Dante Powell (comedian) =

American stand-up comedian

- Born: 1987 or 1988 (age 38–39); Bernice, Louisiana, U.S.
- Occupation: Stand-up comedian
- Years active: 2014-present
- Website: dantepowell.com

Dante Powell is a stand-up comedian from Bernice, Louisiana now living in Des Moines, Iowa. His 2020 album The Squirrels Get Fat, produced by Grammy winner Dan Schlissel and released on his label Stand Up! Records, reached No. 1 on the iTunes and Amazon comedy charts. Paste Magazine called it one of the best albums of 2020 made by a black comedian.

== Early life ==
Powell was born in Bernice, Louisiana. He was inspired by the example of New York Knicks player Willis Reed, who also grew up in Bernice, to become an entertainer. Before getting into comedy, Powell was a trucker.

== Career ==
He moved to Des Moines, Iowa, in 2012, launching a career as a stand-up comic in 2014. His comedy often deals with the culture clash between his Southern upbringing and new Midwest life.

He has performed at the Green Gravel Comedy Festival in Iowa City in 2017, Denver's High Plains Comedy Festival in 2018, and the 2019 10,000 Laughs festival in Minneapolis. He headlined at Iowa City's Floodwater Comedy Festival in 2019, where he recorded the material that would become his debut album, The Squirrels Get Fat.

== Discography ==
- The Squirrels Get Fat (Stand Up! Records, 2020)

== Other work ==
=== Podcast appearances ===
Peace Talk, Episode 16: "Kanye West Of Des Moines" (May 11, 2020)
The Nostalgic Front, Episode 155: "Dante Powell!" (May 4, 2020)
History Made Up, Episode 89: "The History of Bernice, Louisiana" (March 22, 2019)
Set to Destroy, "Dante Powell and Megan Welch Have Thoughtful Sets" (June 25, 2018)
Dr. Heckle, Episode 13: "Concentration Of NBA Hall Of Famers In Bernice, Louisiana" (April 5, 2018)
