= Pittsford Village Historic District =

Historic district in New York, United States

- U.S. National Register of Historic Places
- U.S. Historic district
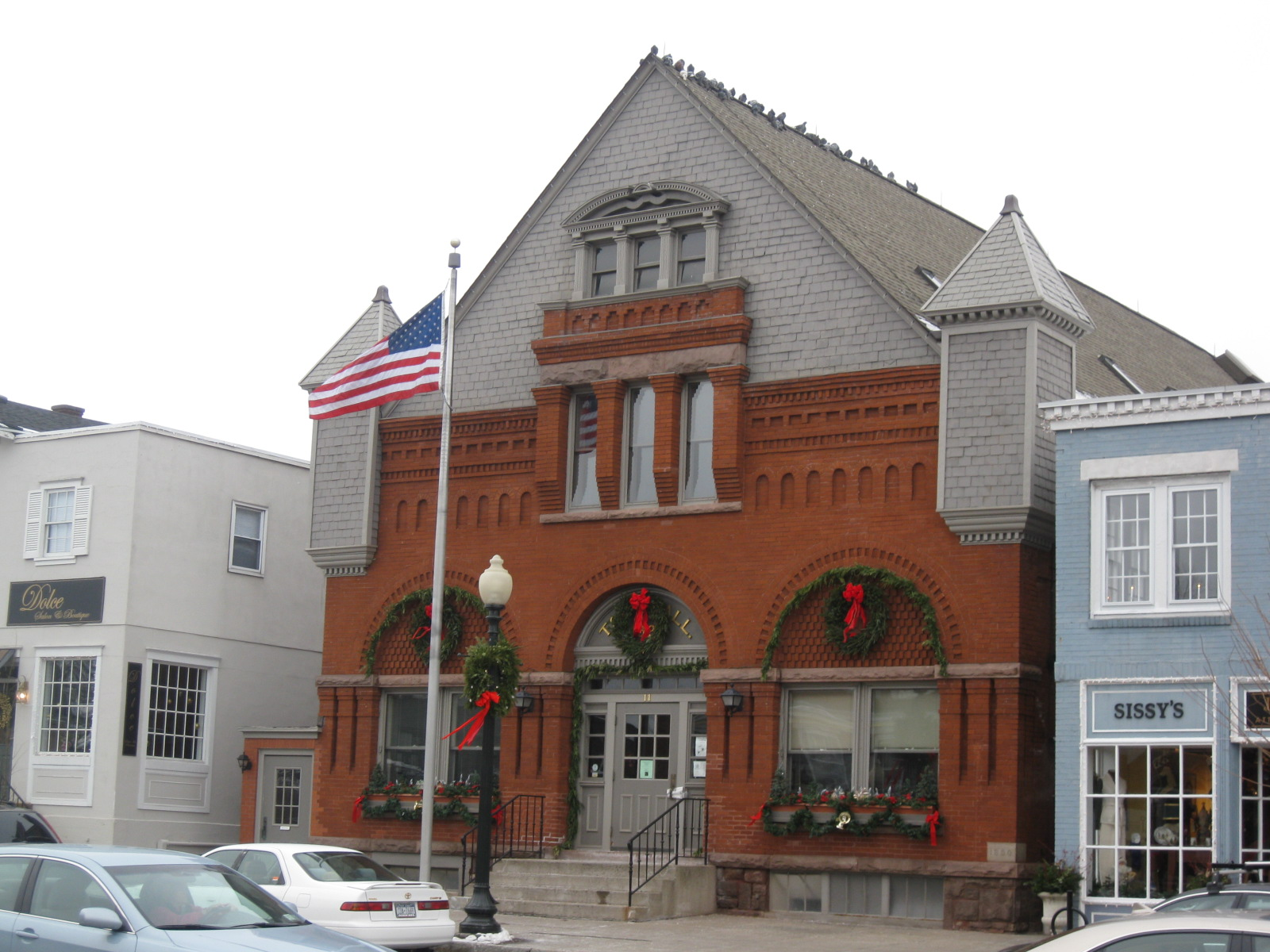
- Pittsford Town Hall, December 2009

- Location within New York Location within the United States
- Location: High, Church, Grove, Line, Locust, Maple, N. & S. Main, State, Sutherland, Wood, Boughton, E. Jefferson, Golf, Rand Streets in Pittsford, New York
- Coordinates: 43°5′21″N 77°31′5″W
- Area: 57 acres (23 ha)
- Built: 1810
- Architectural style: Mid 19th Century Revival, Late Victorian, Federal
- NRHP reference No.: 84002736 (original); 16000163 (increase)

Significant dates
- Added to NRHP: September 07, 1984
- Boundary increase: April 4, 2016

Pittsford Village Historic District is a national historic district located at the village of Pittsford in Monroe County, New York. The district encompasses 198 contributing elements on 107 properties. The district excludes the central business district. It includes 120 contributing dwellings, three churches, two schools and contributing outbuildings dating from the 1810s to 1930s.

It was listed on the National Register of Historic Places in 1984. In 2016 it was greatly expanded, including almost the entire village.

== See also ==
- National Register of Historic Places listings in Monroe County, New York
