= Hildreth-Lord-Hawley Farm =

Historic house in New York, United States

- U.S. National Register of Historic Places
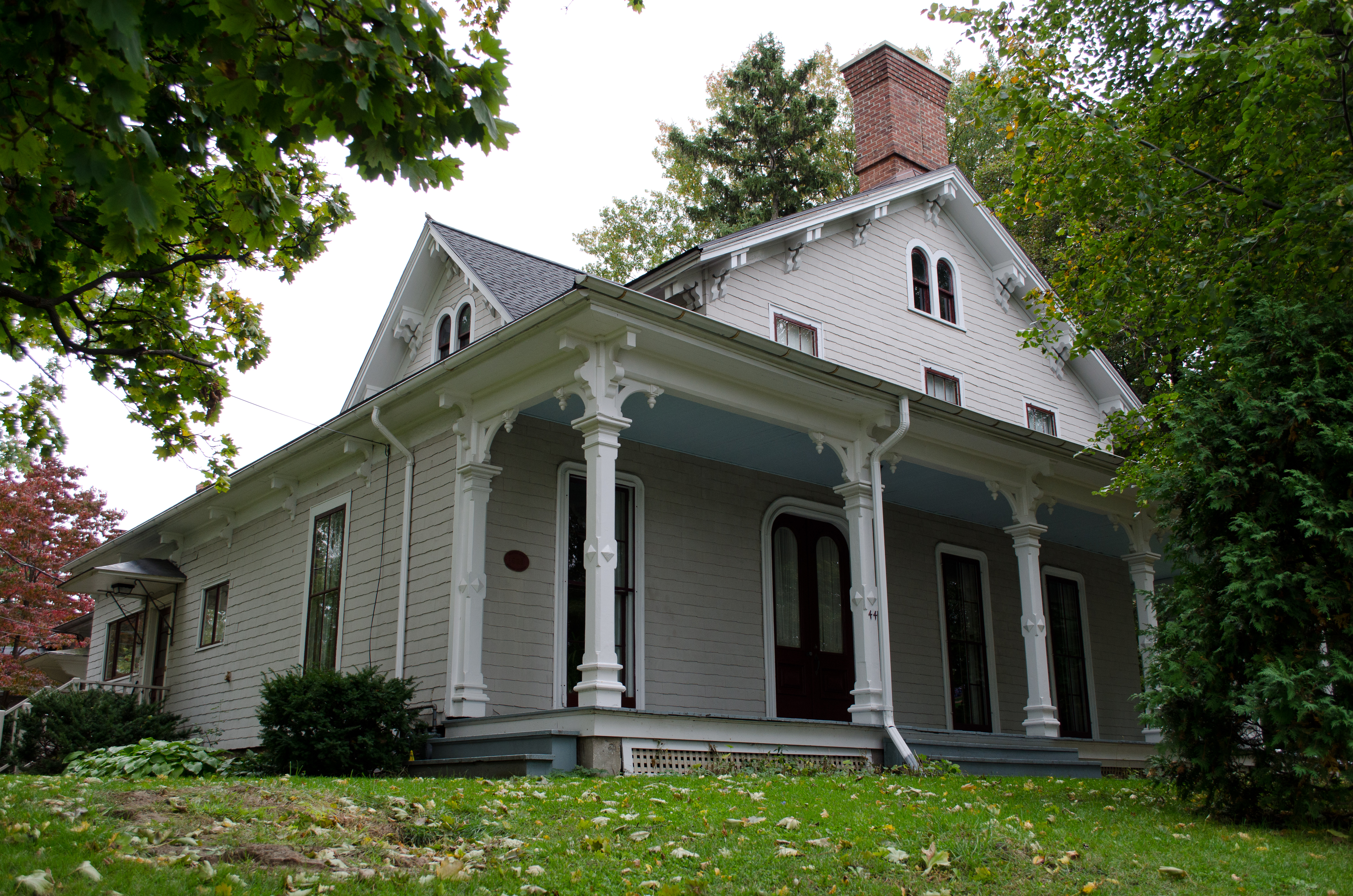
- Hildreth-Lord-Hawley Farmhouse, October 2012

- Location within New York Location within the United States
- Location: 44 N. Main St., Pittsford, New York
- Coordinates: 43°5′37″N 77°30′48″W
- Area: 6 acres (2.4 ha)
- Built: 1814
- Architect: Hidreth, Samuel
- Architectural style: Italianate
- NRHP reference No.: 96001169
- Added to NRHP: October 29, 1996

Hildreth-Lord-Hawley Farm, also known as Pittsford Farms, is a historic home and farm complex located at Pittsford in Monroe County, New York. The 2 1/2-story, five-by-three-bay farmhouse was constructed in about 1814 and remodeled in the 1860s in the Italianate style. The property also includes a contributing dairy, creamery / ice house, tenant house, smoke house, blacksmith shop, and wagon shed. Contributing objects include a stone retaining wall with cast-iron fence, stone fireplace, fountain, and cast iron statuary.

It was listed on the National Register of Historic Places in 1996.

== Gallery ==
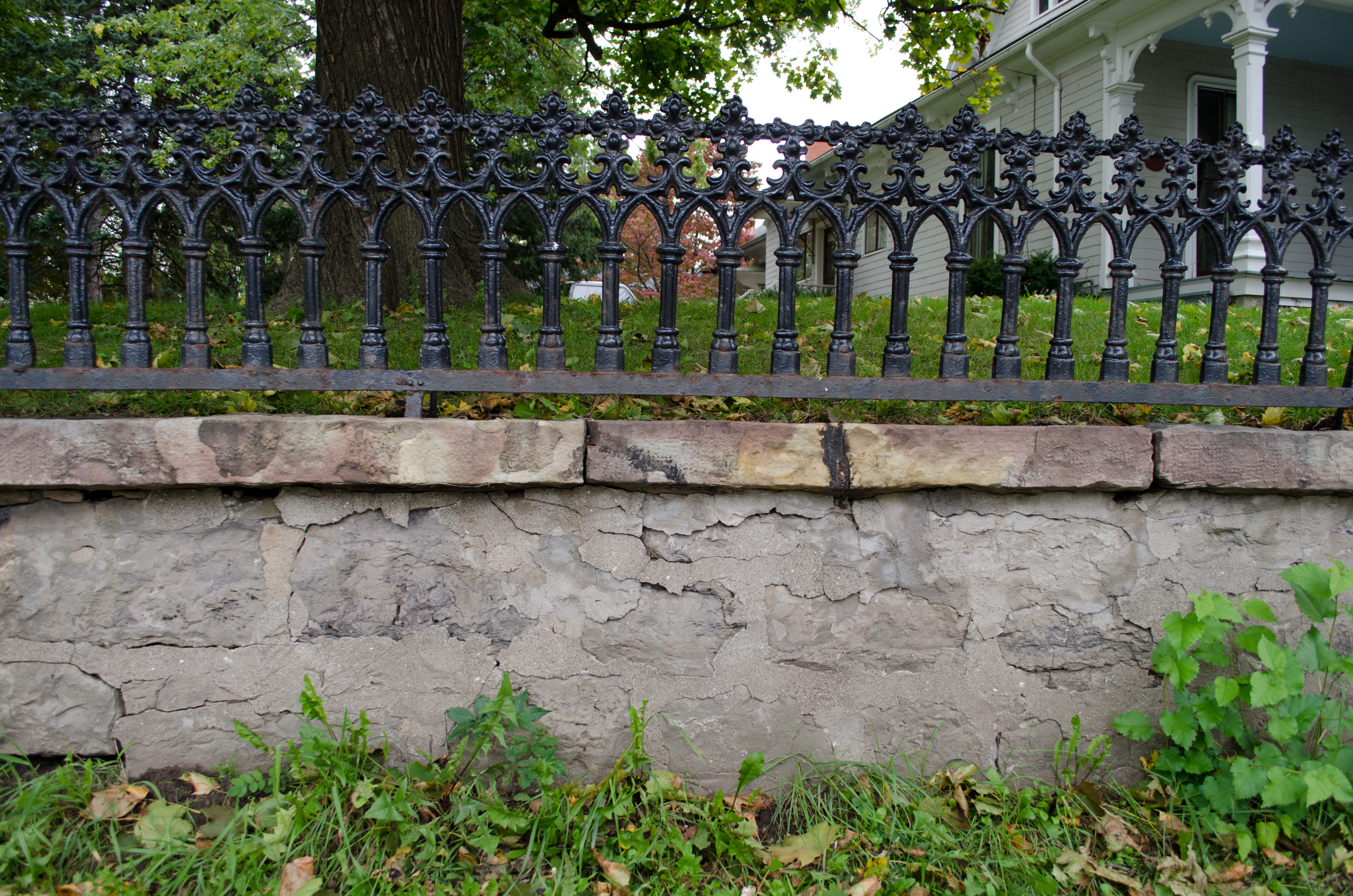
Iron fence and stone retaining wall

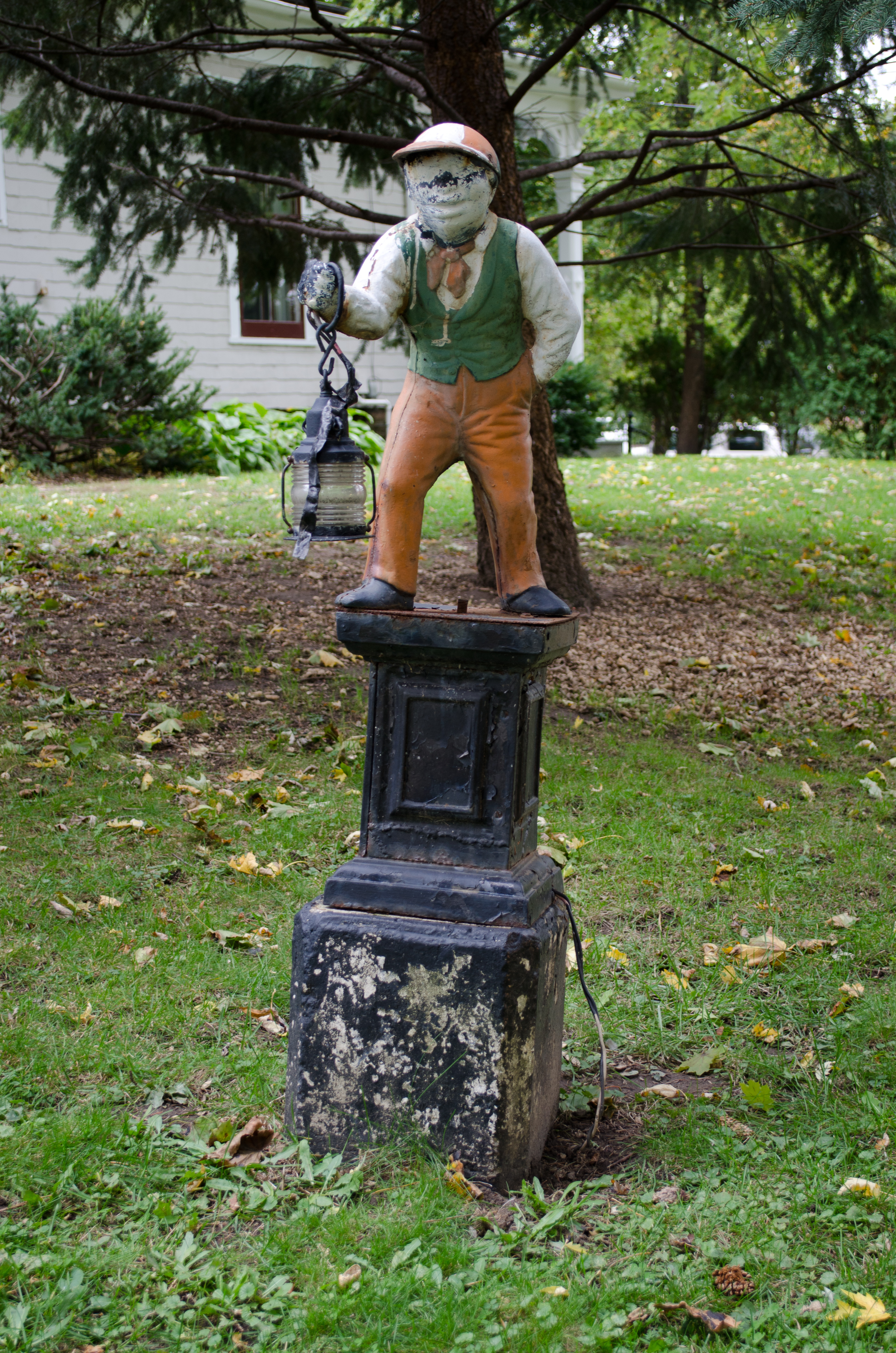
Cast iron statuary in the farmhouse yard
