= Phoenix Building (Pittsford, New York) =

Historic commercial building in New York, United States

- U.S. National Register of Historic Places
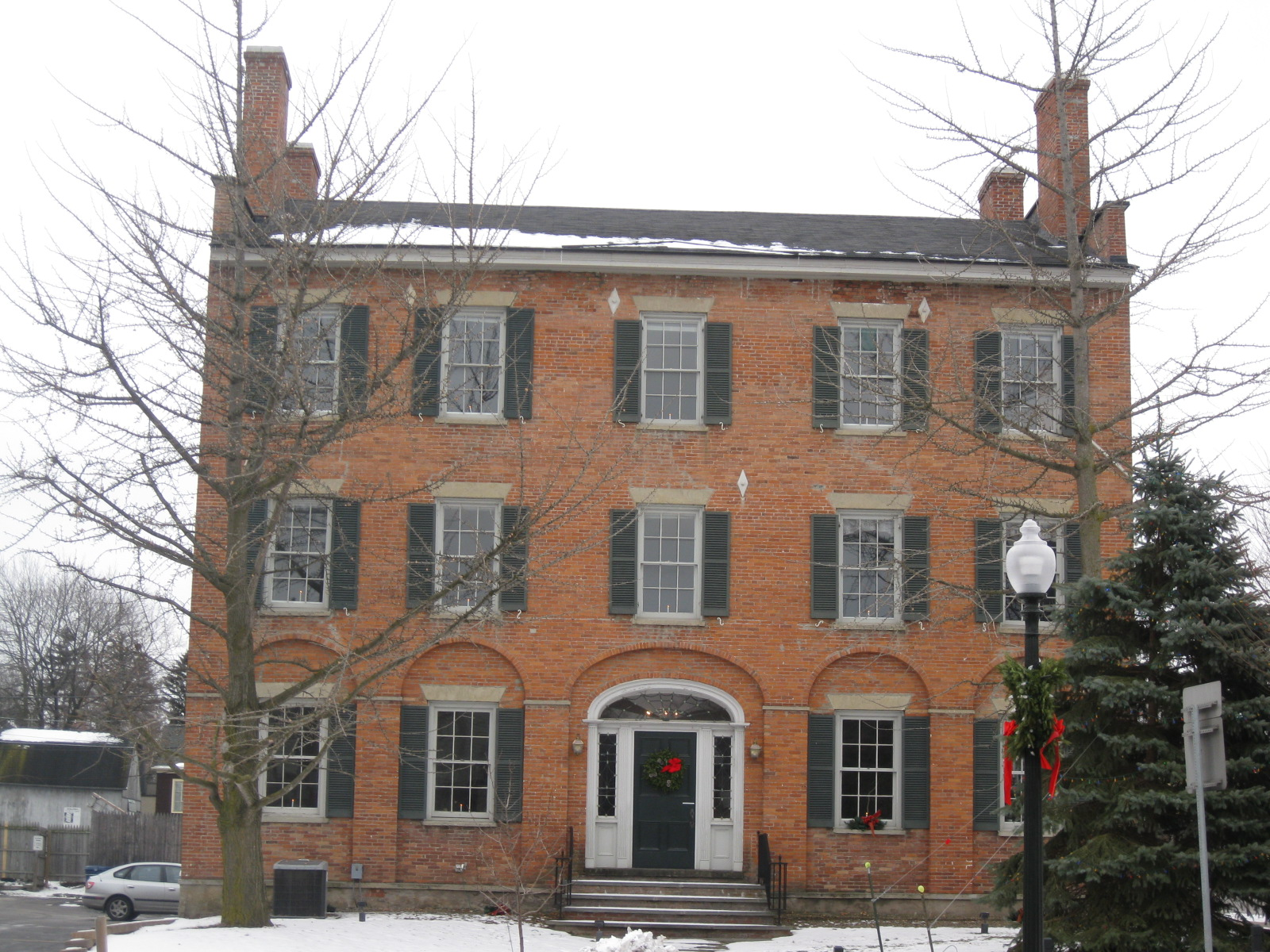
- Phoenix Building, December 2009

- Location within New York Location within the United States
- Location: S. Main and State Sts., Pittsford, New York
- Coordinates: 43°5′26″N 77°30′56″W
- Area: 1 acre (0.40 ha)
- Built: 1820
- Architectural style: Federal
- NRHP reference No.: 74001257
- Added to NRHP: August 07, 1974

Phoenix Building, also known as the Phoenix Hotel or Pittsford Inn, is a historic inn and tavern located at Pittsford in Monroe County, New York. It is a Federal style structure built around 1820 to serve stage passengers. It later served passengers along the Erie Canal. The building operated as a hotel until the 1950s.

== History ==
Early Twentieth Century newspaper references states that a hotel or inn was built on the site in 1807 by Glover Perrin in 1807, that this business played host to Dewitt Clinton when the New York Governor and others were scouting Western New York for a route for the Erie Canal, and that the original structure burned down and was replaced by the current structure, built by John Acer in 1820-1821.

The building was known as the Phoenix Hotel in the 19th Century In the 1820s the hotel was a stage coach stop for lines passing through Pittsford from Canandaigua N.Y. and Palmyra, N. Y.

In 1826, the anti-Mason activist William Morgan was taken from his jail in Canandaigua and stopped at the hotel for a meal, before being spirited away to Canada. The Gilbert du Motier, Marquis de Lafayette stayed at the hotel in 1824, and members of the Vanderbilt family passed by (by stage coach) in 1837.

William E. Edmonds of Rochester NY wrote that during the election of 1860, Frederick Douglass was scheduled to speak to Republicans in Pittsford NY. The meeting was to be open air, but due to rain it had to be moved indoors. According to Edmonds, racist opponents of Douglass rented the hall of the Phoenix Hotel and locked it all day, depriving him of the only assembly hall in the town, but Douglass made his speech in a nearby warehouse. Two newspaper references state that the “it is said” the hotel was a stop in the Underground Railroad, but this claim may need further verification.

The famous racewalker Edward Payson Weston passed through Pittsford in his 1867 walk from Boston to Chicago, but was said to have been denied dinner at the Phoenix, the proprietor taking him for a tramp. He passed through again in 1922, in a walk from Buffalo, New York to New York City, at age 84, and was greeted by public officials and the Pittsford Town Band.

The hotel had multiple owners, as many as 29 between 1807 and 1929. Owners have included, besides Perrin and Acer (who sold out around 1839), William Hicks, Henry M. Eckler (1879), and Daniel and Adam Finucane (1883). After being owned and run as the Phoenix by Frank Zornow, the hotel was renamed Tyler's Inn in 1921, when it was purchased by George L. and Harold L. Tyler for $21,000, who then sold it to Cowen and Knight, then sold for $65,000 to Morris Kaplan in 1925, then sold to E. A. Comstock. The hotel was renamed the Pittsford Inn in 1929.

The restaurant took on a Bavarian theme in 1933 with Otto Thurn's Bavarians orchestra. While some newspaper references state the hotel was renamed “Old Heidelberg”, that was actually the name of the restaurant, and advertising styled the business as “Old Heidelberg at the Pittsford Inn”from 1934 to 1950.

John F. Wegman, co-founders of the Wegmans markets, leased the property by 1932 and lived there as his home by 1935. After Wegman's death in 1950, his estate sold the building to James Randall of the Randall Development for $56,000 in 1951. Two fires damaged the building by 1957, and it was abandoned and empty. Andrew Wolfe, of the Wolfe Publications, purchased the building in the 1960s, making it the home of the Brighton Pittsford Post. It is currently a private office building. (

It was listed on the National Register of Historic Places in 1974.
