= Adolph Lomb House =

Historic house in New York, United States

- U.S. National Register of Historic Places
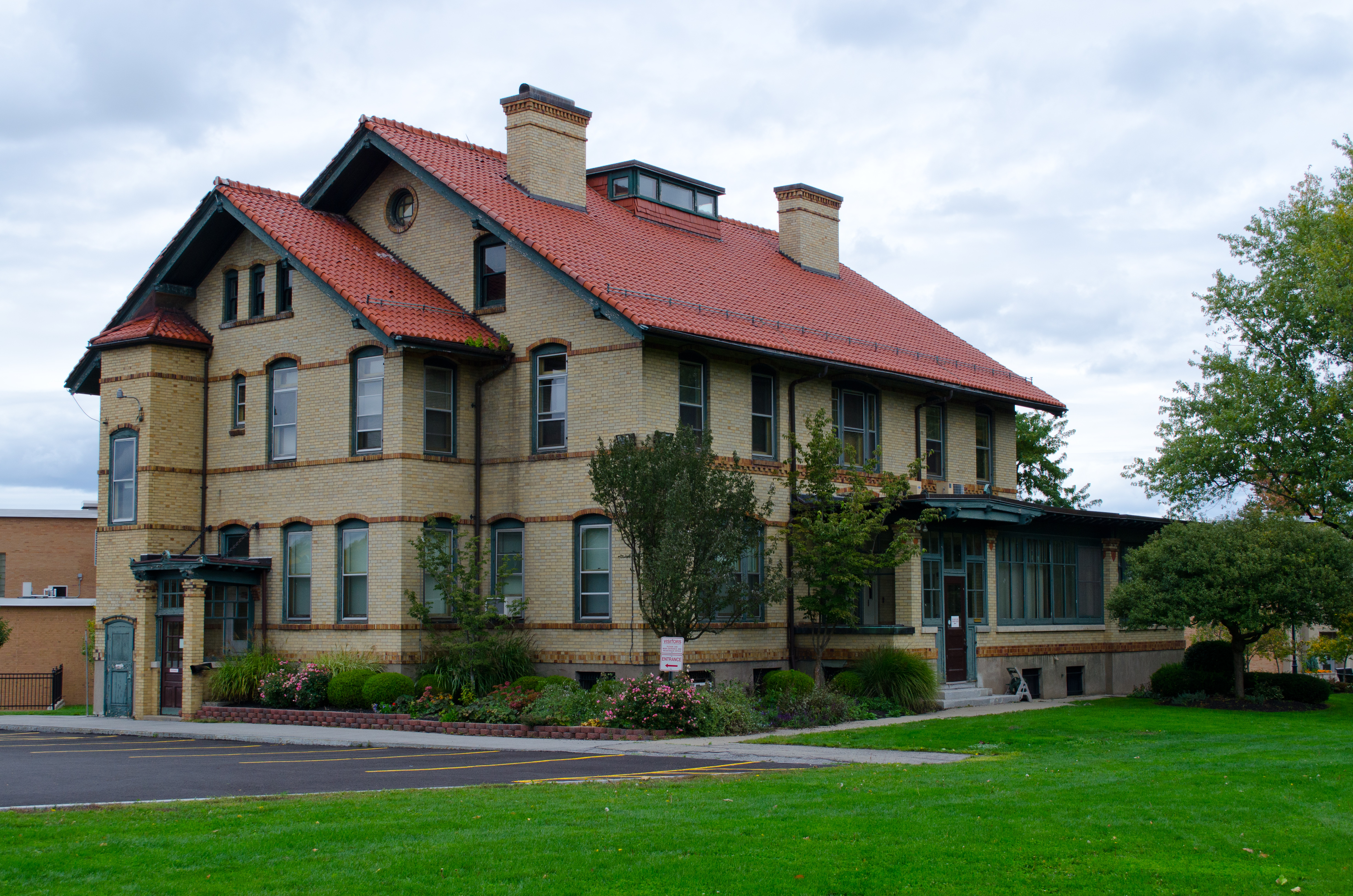
- Adolph Lomb House, October 2012

- Location within New York Location within the United States
- Location: Jct. of Sutherland St. and W. Jefferson Rd., Pittsford, New York
- Coordinates: 43°5′20″N 77°31′26″W
- Area: less than one acre
- Built: 1907
- Architectural style: Late 19th And 20th Century Revivals
- NRHP reference No.: 94001597
- Added to NRHP: January 24, 1995

Adolph Lomb House is a historic home located at Pittsford in Monroe County, New York. It is a large 1 1/2-story building with a gable roof oriented to the facade. It was built in 1907 of poured concrete faced in brick. It was built as the focal point of a large farm / summer estate for Adolph Lomb, eldest son of Henry Lomb (1848–1908), one of the co-founders of the Rochester-based optical company Bausch and Lomb.

The House was listed on the National Register of Historic Places in 1995. Until recently, the building housed the headquarters of the Pittsford Central School District. After the renovation of Barker Road Middle School, most administrative offices moved to Barker's east wing. Today, the Lomb house contains offices of Sutherland's administration, as well as a few minor district-wide offices.

== Gallery ==
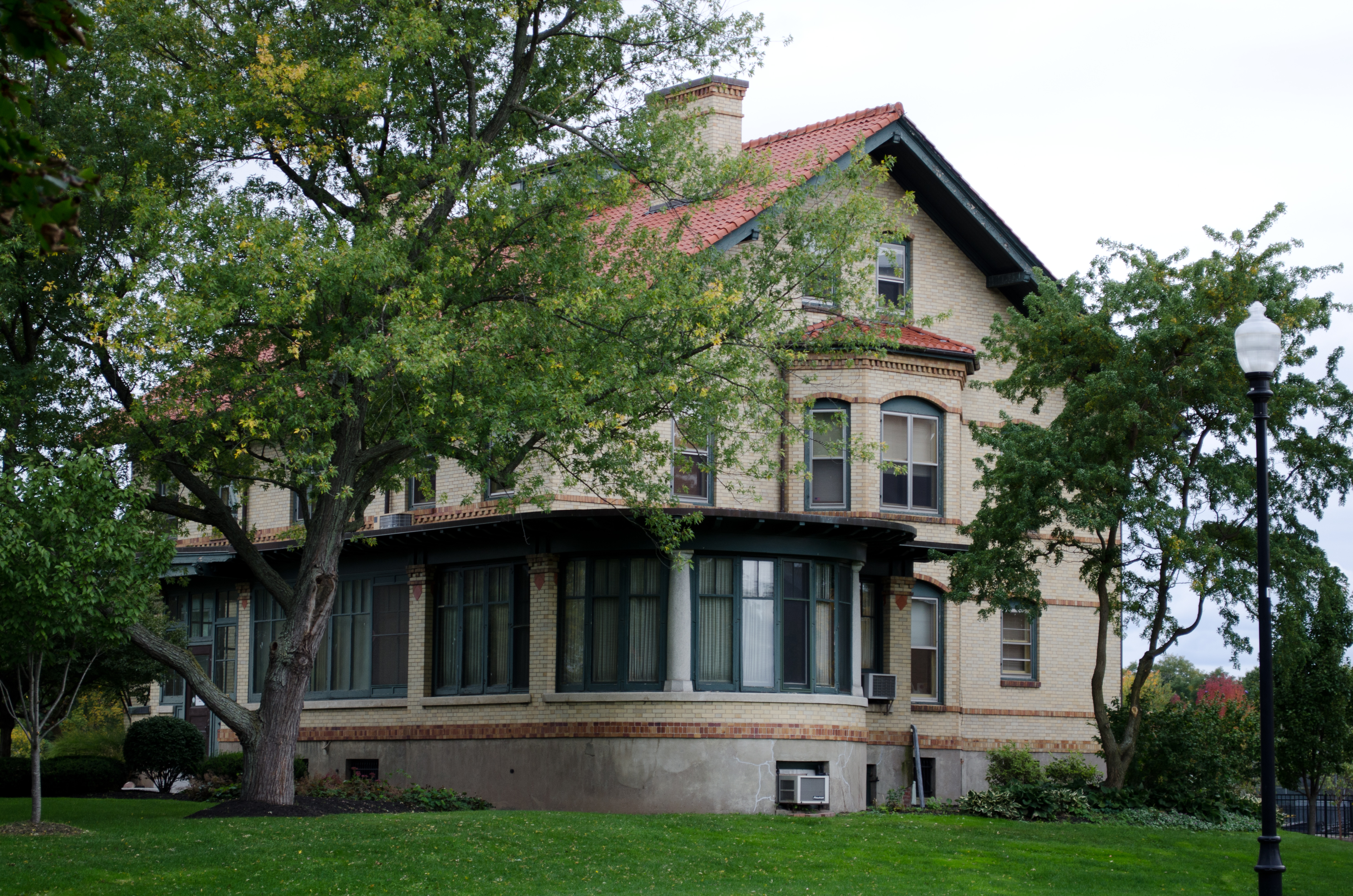
Rear view
