= Pittsford (village), New York =

Pittsford, New York
- Village
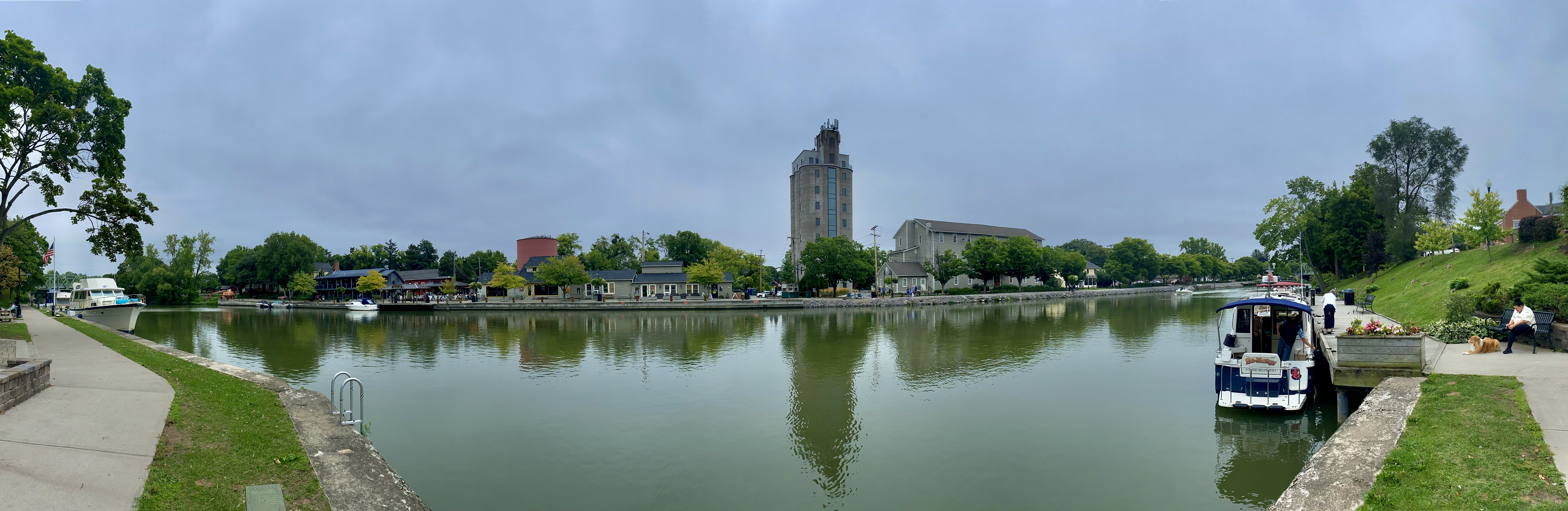
- View of Schoen Place from Carpenter Park on the Erie Canal, Pittsford

- Location in Monroe County and the state of New York

- Location of New York in the United States
- Coordinates: 43°05′20″N 77°30′54″W
- Country: United States
- State: New York
- County: Monroe
- Town: Pittsford
- Incorporated: 1827; 199 years ago

Government
  - Mayor: Alysa Subtelny Plummer (2021)

Area
  - Total: 0.73 sq mi (1.88 km^{2})
  - Land: 0.70 sq mi (1.82 km^{2})
  - Water: 0.019 sq mi (0.05 km^{2})
- Elevation: 492 ft (150 m)

Population (2020)
  - Total: 1,419
  - Density: 2,015.5/sq mi (778.17/km^{2})
- Time zone: UTC-5 (EST)
  - Summer (DST): UTC-4 (EDT)
- ZIP Code: 14534
- Area code: 585
- FIPS code: 36-58354
- Website: www.villageofpittsford.com

Pittsford is a village in Monroe County, New York, United States. The population was 1,419 at the 2020 census. It is named after Pittsford, Vermont, the native town of a founding father. It was incorporated in 1827. The village, an Erie Canal community, is in the town of Pittsford and is a suburb of Rochester.

== History ==
Pittsford is the oldest of Monroe County's ten incorporated villages. The village was the site of a spring-fed pond which attracted the first European Americans. Israel Stone, the village's first settler, built the village's first structure, a log house next to the pond, in 1789.

The town of Pittsford surrounding the village was established in 1789 and was originally named "Northfield". Pittsford's original hamlet settlement was located a mile south of the current village. In the second decade of the nineteenth century the opening of a new east–west highway (now NYS Route 31) and the surveying of the proposed Erie Canal route caused settlement to migrate northward to the Four Corners area.

Early Pittsford served as the governmental seat for the town of Northfield, comprising most of what is now eastern Monroe County. The settlement contained the county's first school (1794), the first library (1803), the first permanent church (1807), the first post office (1811), and the first newspaper (1815). In 1813, after the surrounding towns were organized, reducing Northfield's territory, the name Pittsford was adopted to honor the Vermont birthplace of Colonel Caleb Hopkins, a farmer, community leader and hero from the War of 1812. Pittsford's first church began meeting in 1803. The congregation survives today as the First Presbyterian Church on Church Street.

Pittsford prospered as a local trading center due to its location at the intersection of the primary road between the mills at the Genesee Falls in Rochesterville and Canandaigua, the region's oldest and largest town and the new east–west road (now New York State Route 31). In 1816, Samuel Hildreth established the area's first stage coach line, eventually putting Pittsford at the center of a large stage network covering much of western New York.

Pittsford grew rapidly after the opening of the Erie Canal in 1822 and was incorporated as a village on July 4, 1827. Local entrepreneurs profited from both canal construction and other businesses which benefited from the canal trade. Pittsford's excellent agricultural soil led to the early and successful development of commercial agriculture. However, because of its superior waterpower, Rochester soon eclipsed Pittsford as Monroe County's dominant economic and population center. Pittsford grew slowly through the middle of the nineteenth century. One result of Pittsford's mid-century decline was that unlike other local towns, many of Pittsford's earliest buildings have survived. Boosted by the arrival of the Rochester & Auburn railroad in 1834, Pittsford remained an important shipping center for local grains and produce until the late twentieth century. Village industries included a flour mill, lumberyards, produce warehouses, a malt house and several fruit dry houses. The present charm of the village's waterfront is due to the survival of historic canal warehouses, mills, and silos, which in recent years have been rehabilitated for offices, boutiques, and restaurants.

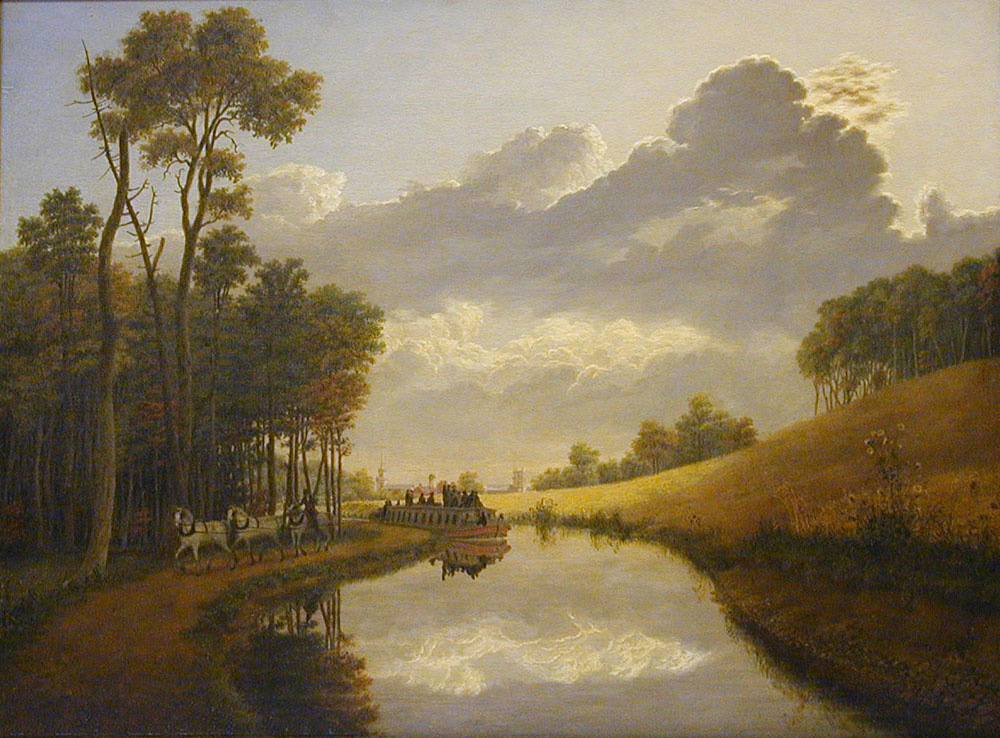
A Sultry Calm by George Harvey of Great Britain shows a bend in the Erie Canal just west of Pittsford in 1837.

Beginning in the 1870s, the village and town of Pittsford once again began to grow. In the second half of the nineteenth century wealthy Rochesterians began to establish country estates in and around the village. These estates were the first step in Pittsford's evolution from a farming community into a suburb of Rochester.

Three of these grand homes remain within the village. Pittsford Farms, the oldest of the three village estates, was established in the 1860s by Jarvis Lord, a canal contractor. The property has retained its historic appearance and remains today a 200-acre (0.81 km^{2}) working farm, owned by descendants of the Zornow family. The farm's dairy plant continues to bottle milk in returnable glass containers. The Town of Pittsford has purchased the development rights to this farm and seven others to ensure their open space remains for generations to come.

During the first quarter of the twentieth century, the construction of the Rochester & Eastern Trolley line and growing automobile ownership placed Pittsford within easy commuting distance of Rochester. During the early twentieth century, a number of infrastructure improvements were completed in the village, including a water system, paved streets, storm and sanitary sewers, and electric street lights. These decades also witnessed the development of new village neighborhoods of four-square, Craftsman and Colonial Revival homes. The establishment of four country clubs and two colleges just outside the village contributed to the village's desirability as a premium suburban residential community.

By the 1950s Pittsford began to experience significant population growth from suburban residential development. As the area surrounding the village continued to grow, residents became increasingly concerned about the effects of this growth on the village. Increasing traffic, demolition of historic buildings, commercial encroachment into historic neighborhoods, and the loss of open space led to the beginning of grass roots preservation efforts. Over the last fifty years, residents, business people, and government officials have worked cooperatively to preserve, enhance and revitalize Pittsford Village. Among the community's accomplishments are the restoration of numerous village buildings, the establishment of a historic preservation district, the redevelopment of the village's Erie Canal waterfront for commercial and recreational use, and the preservation of farmland through the town's purchase of development rights. Today the village of Pittsford is widely admired for the preservation of its historic character and its charming walkable business district.

The Hildreth-Lord-Hawley Farm, Hopkins Farm, Adolph Lomb House, Phoenix Building, Pittsford Village Historic District, Spring House, and Thomas Youngs House are listed on the National Register of Historic Places.

== Geography ==
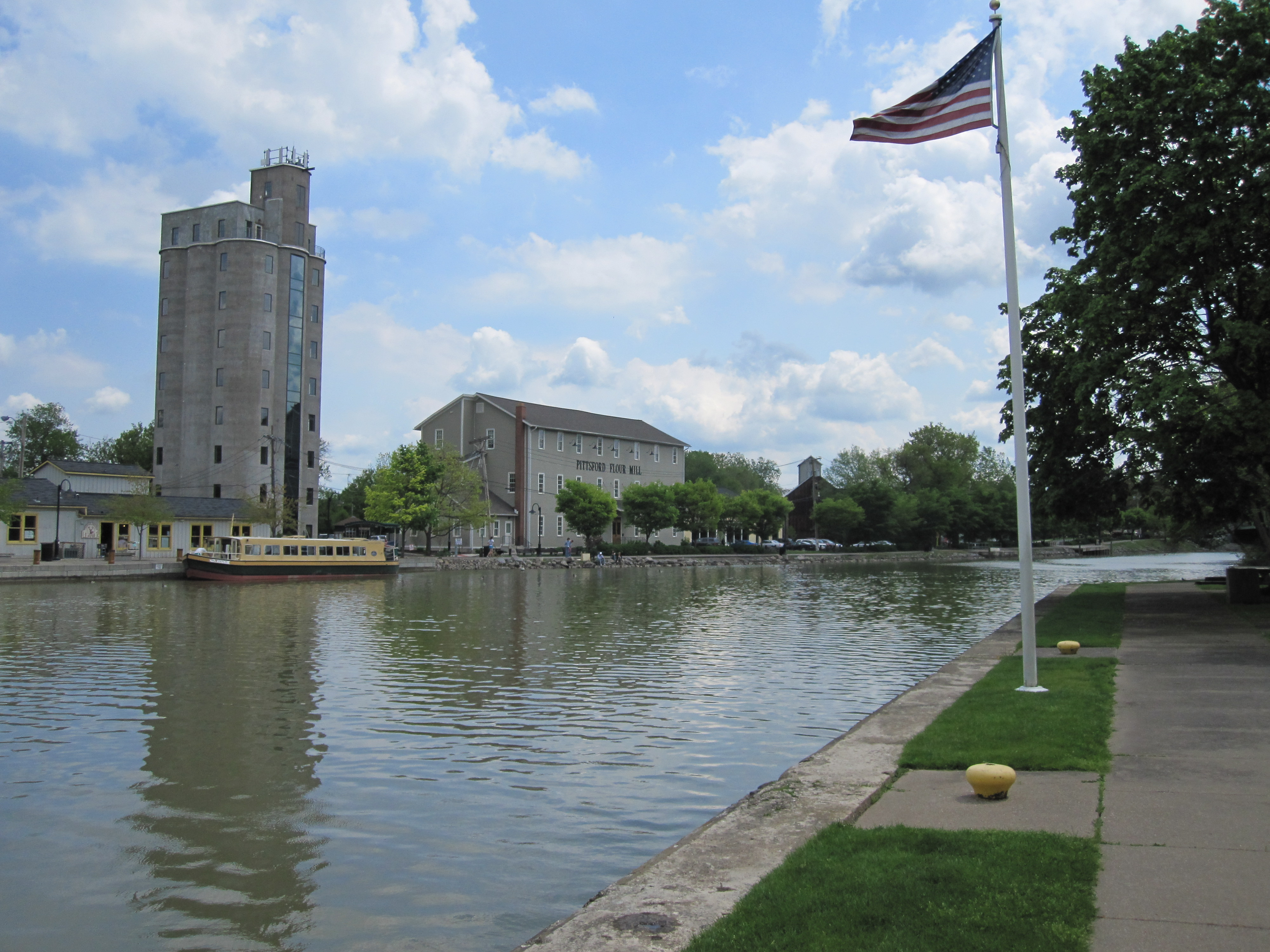
Schoen Place as viewed across the Erie Canal

Pittsford village is located in eastern Monroe County at 43°5′20″N 77°30′54″W (43.089013, -77.515239), in the north-central part of the town of Pittsford. New York State Route 31 passes through the village center, leading northwest 6 miles (10 km) to downtown Rochester and east-southeast 15 miles (24 km) to Palmyra. State Route 96 passes through Pittsford as its Main Street, leading by a more northerly route 7 miles (11 km) to downtown Rochester and southeast 10 miles (16 km) to Victor. Route 252 follows Route 96 along Main Street but leads northeast 2 miles (3 km) to East Rochester and west 13 miles (21 km) to Chili.

According to the U.S. Census Bureau, the village of Pittsford has a total area of 0.72 square miles (1.86 km^{2}), of which 0.02 square miles (0.05 km^{2}), or 2.76%, are water. The village is bisected by the historic Erie Canal.

== Government ==
In March 2021, Alysa Subtelny Plummer was elected mayor of the village, defeating incumbent of 28 years Robert Corby; Plummer was the first woman elected to that position.

Mayors

Robert Corby (R) (1993–2021)

Alysa Subtelny Plummer (D) (2021–present)

== Notable people ==
- Pete Correale, stand-up comedian, broadcaster and writer
- Mary Therese Friel, Miss New York USA 1979, Miss USA 1979
- Thomas Kempshall, former US congressman
- Andrew Rea, host of the YouTube cooking channel Binging with Babish
- Magnus Sheffield, professional cyclist
- Abby Wambach, former USA women's soccer player; Olympian, World Champion

== Gallery ==
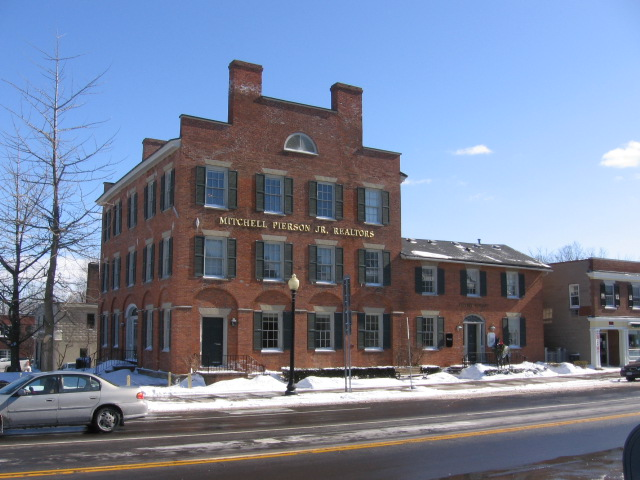
The c. 1826 Phoenix Hotel marks Pittsford's Four Corners intersection. The building is one of the finest Federal style structures surviving in Western New York.

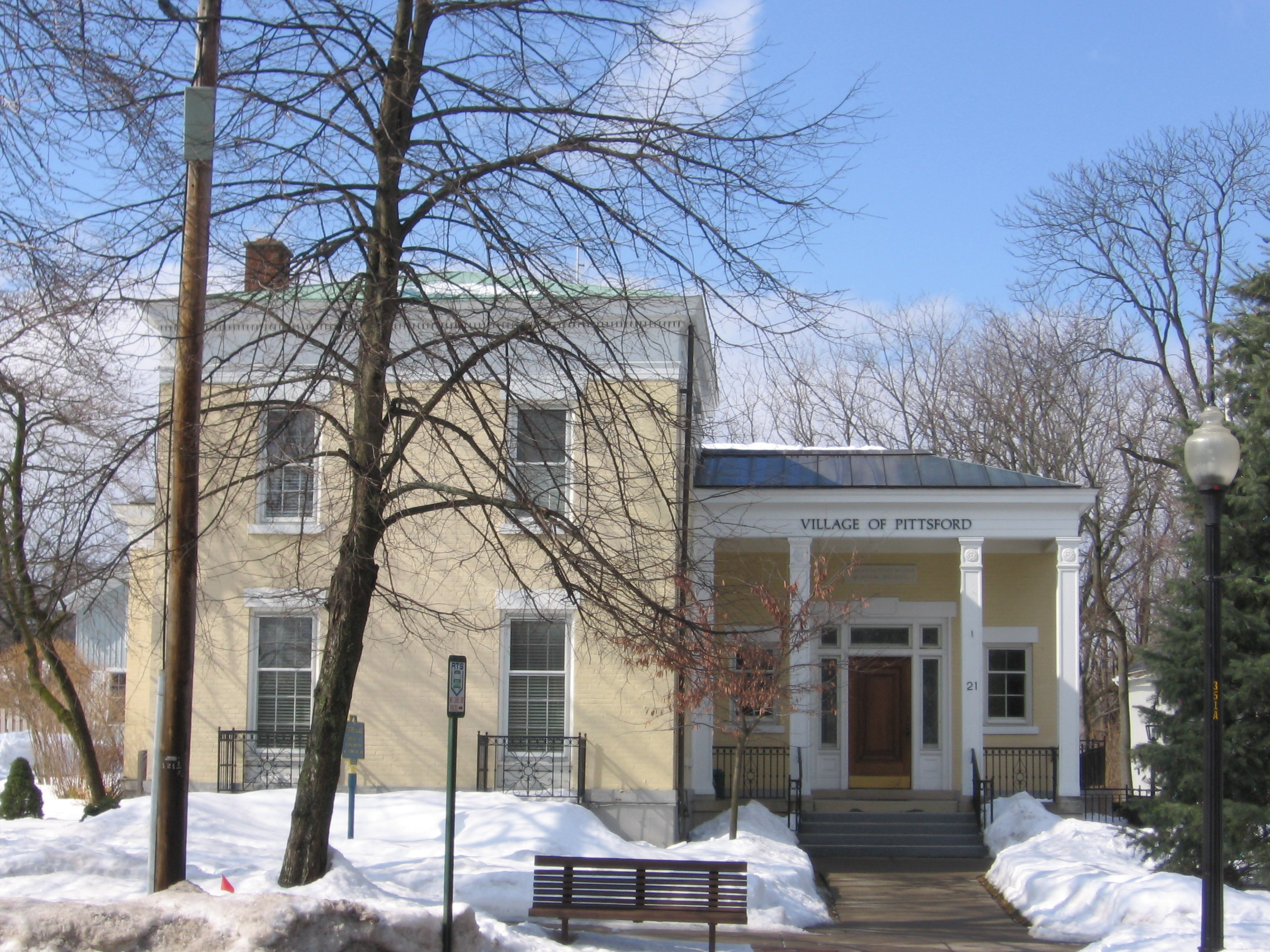
Pittsford's Village Hall was constructed as a home in 1855. In 1937, the building was remodeled in the colonial revival style and donated to the village.

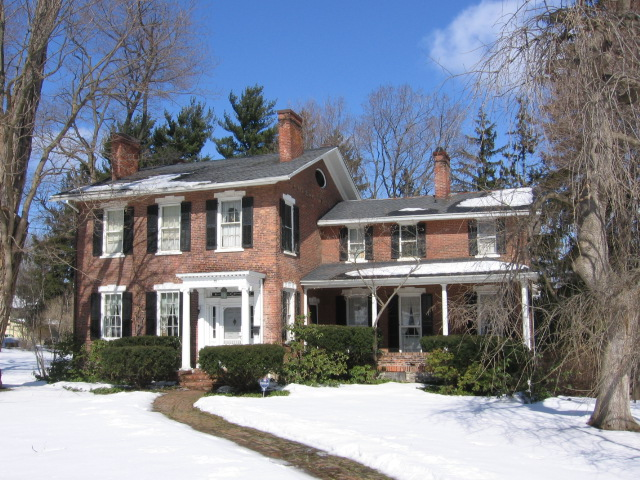
The Sylvanus Lathrop house was constructed in 1822 by the general contractor responsible for Pittsford's section of the Erie Canal.

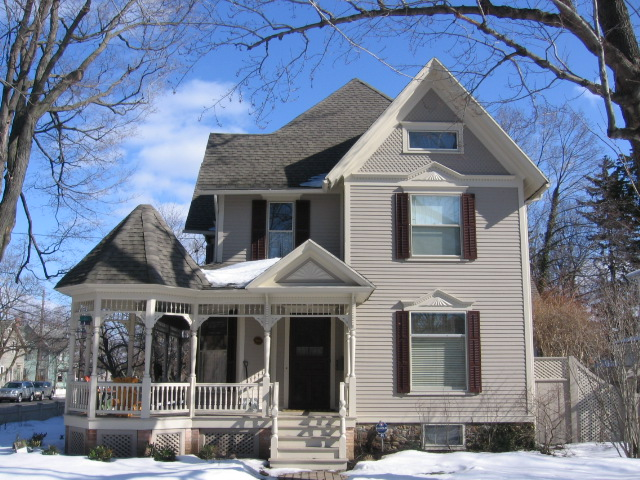
The Queen Anne c. 1898 Vogt-Allen house was built by the family operating the Pittsford Flour Mill.

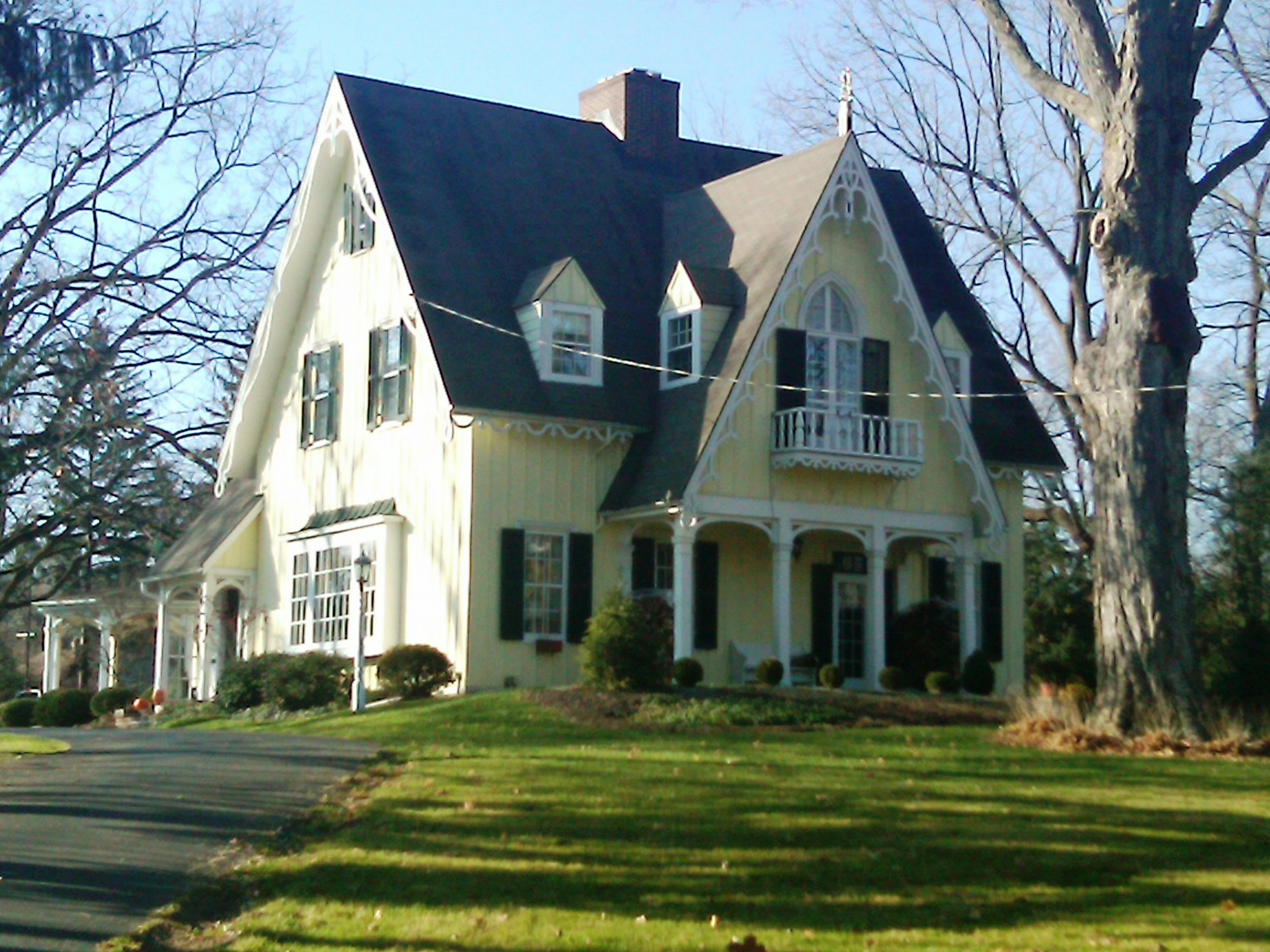
Dr. Hartwell Carver, the original owner of this fine c. 1852 Gothic revival home, was a nationally prominent advocate of the transcontinental railroad.

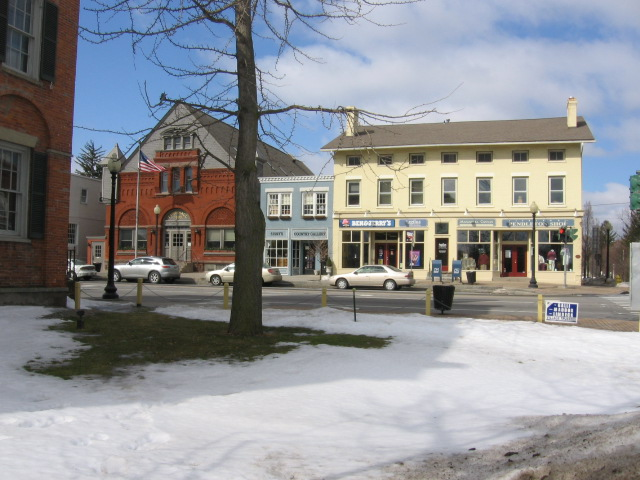
Like much of the village, Pittsford's compact business district is distinguished by many fine nineteenth-century buildings.

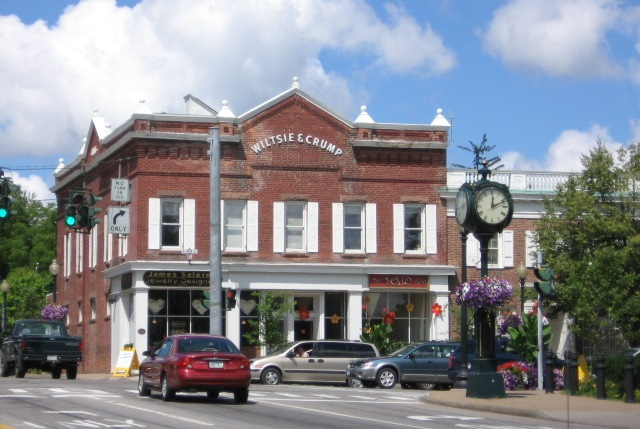
The c. 1887 Wiltsie and Crump Building, originally housing a dry goods store, replaced an earlier structure which had burned.

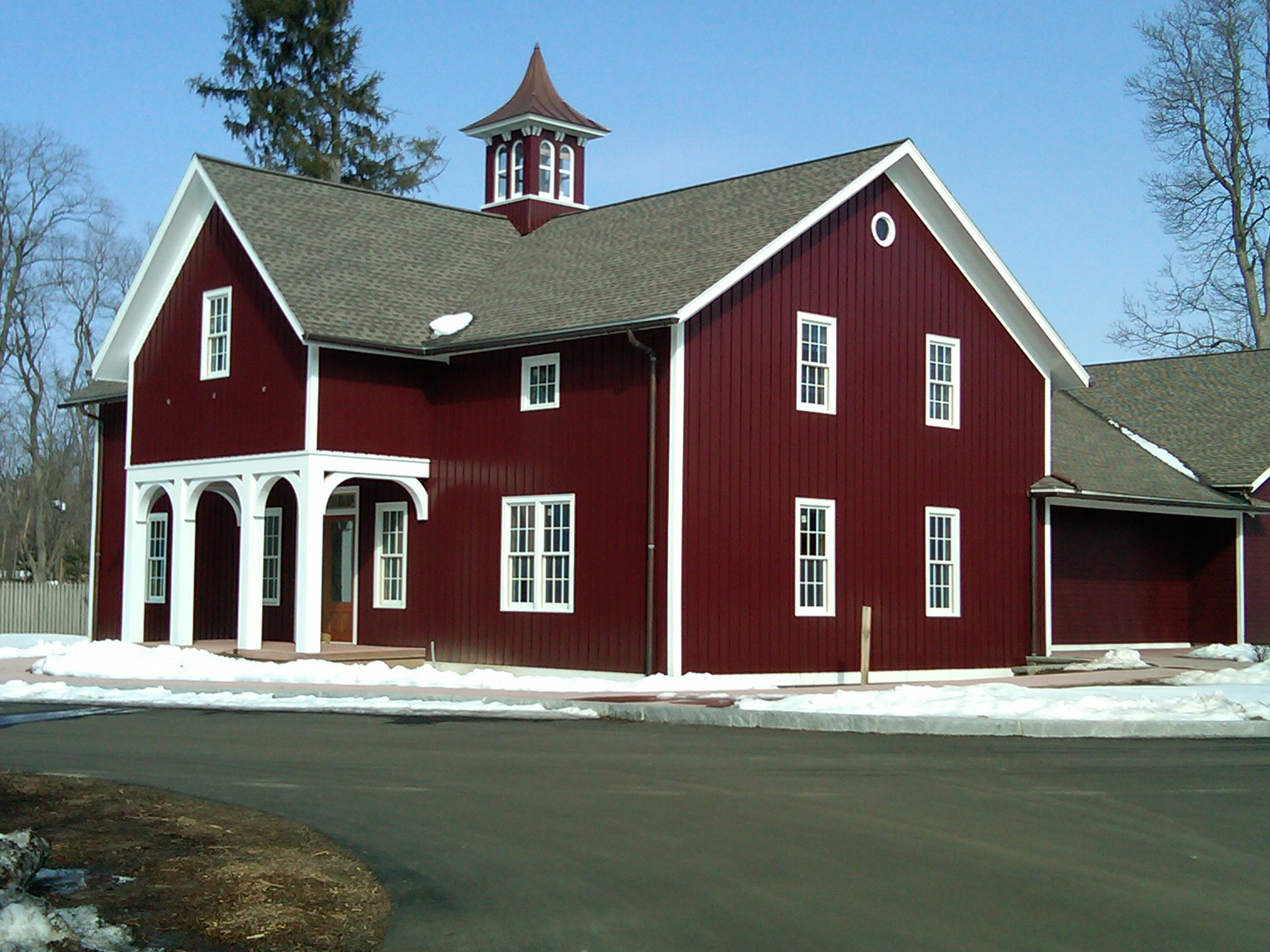
Pittsford Farms dairy, established in 1888, is Pittsford's oldest operating business.
