= Spring House (Pittsford, New York) =

- U.S. National Register of Historic Places
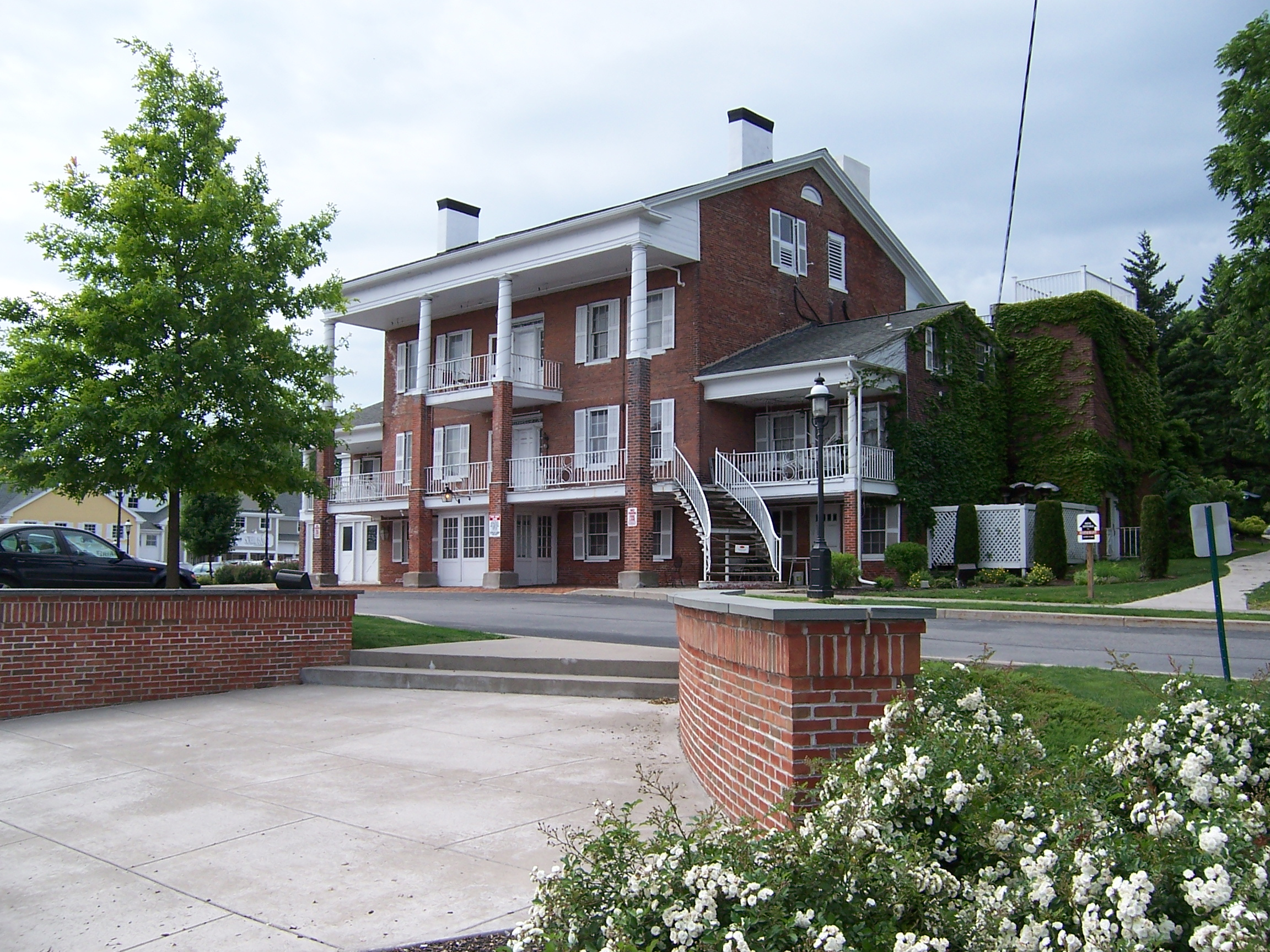
- Spring House, June 2009

- Location within New York Location within the United States
- Nearest city: Pittsford, New York
- Coordinates: 43°6′33″N 77°32′47″W
- Area: 2 acres (0.81 ha)
- Built: 1832; 194 years ago
- NRHP reference No.: 75001199
- Added to NRHP: November 20, 1975

Spring House is a historic inn located at Pittsford in Monroe County, New York. It is a 2 1/2- to 3 1/2-story brick building constructed into a hillside that, at the time, overlooked the Erie Canal. (The canal has long since been rerouted to the south.) The structure dates to 1832 and was built as a health spa located at Monroe Springs, a set of sulphur springs. It serves as a restaurant on busy Monroe Avenue.

It was listed on the National Register of Historic Places in 1975.
