= Thomas Youngs House =

Historic house in New York, United States

- U.S. National Register of Historic Places
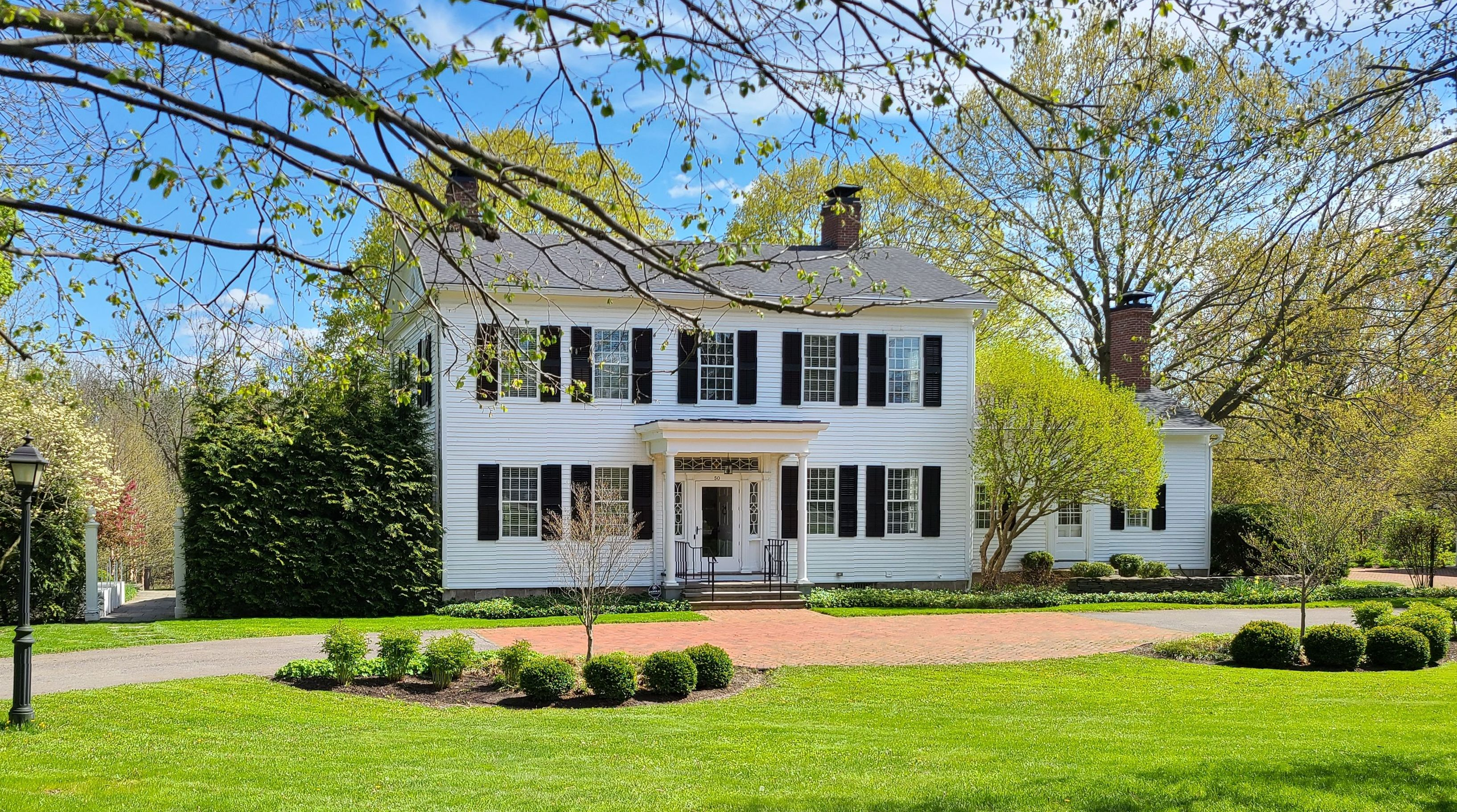
- Thomas Youngs House, May 2023

- Location within New York Location within the United States
- Location: 50 Mitchell Road., Pittsford, New York
- Coordinates: 43°5′0″N 77°30′17″W
- Area: 9.1 acres (3.7 ha)
- Built: 1818
- Architectural style: Federal
- NRHP reference No.: 93000546
- Added to NRHP: June 24, 1993

Thomas Youngs House is a historic home located at Pittsford in Monroe County, New York, United States. It was originally built in 1818 as a 1 1/2-story frame dwelling. It was substantially enlarged in 1830 with the addition of a 2 1/2-story, Federal-style gable-roofed main block. The structure was moved to its present location in 1982; it was originally located 22 miles east on New York State Route 21 in the town of Marion, in Wayne County, New York.

The house was a prominent stop in the Underground Railway in the days of slavery. Escaped slaves came up from the South, some using the Erie Canal. Leaving the canal at Palmyra, they made their way north to Pultneyville, where they boarded boats for Canada. Many apparently stopped at the Youngs's house. Beside the fireplace in the back bedroom is what appears to be a small cupboard for storing wood. In reality however it is a considerable space, and for short periods at least, could be used to hide as many as eight or ten persons.

The builder was Thomas Youngs, who had moved into the area in the 1790s from New Jersey. He had married Phebe Durfee, a member of a prominent family from Tiverton, Rhode Island, just east of Newport, near the Massachusetts border. It is said that the family made the move in 1791 as a group of 31, including freed slaves. They settled in and around Palmyra. Youngs and members of the Durfee family bought land in Marion.

Youngs apparently prospered first as a farmer, and then apparently built a mill, and finally began to serve as a banker in the area. In 1818 he built what is now the south wing of the house. It was a story-and-a-half cottage. In 1830 he had prospered sufficiently to build the main portion of the house, which was a substantial home for the era and surprisingly urban. The south wing was used for many years only for storage, but was converted early in the 20th century into an apartment. A fire in this wing in about 1960 resulted in many changes in the wing's interior. The chimney and mantel in the south end of the large room are probably much as they were originally, with a cooking fireplace in the basement.

Except for the kitchen, which was probably Youngs's business office, the main portion of the house is unchanged. A portion of the east wing was probably a summer kitchen.

It was listed on the National Register of Historic Places in 1993.
