= William Mizell Sr. House =

Historic house in Georgia, United States

- U.S. National Register of Historic Places
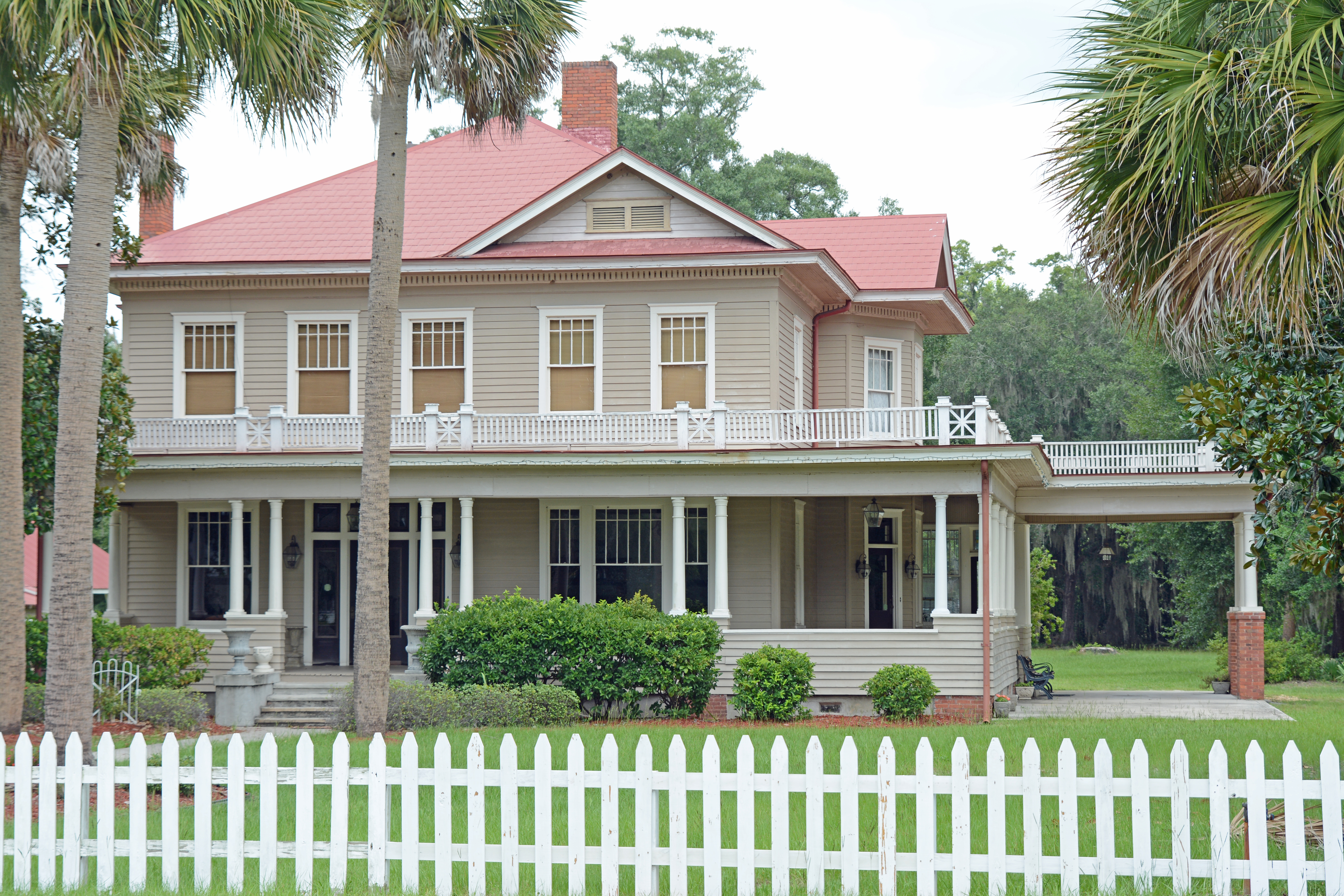

- Location within Georgia Location within the United States
- Location: 101 Palm St., Folkston, Georgia
- Coordinates: 30°50′2″N 82°0′28″W
- Area: 4.6 acres (1.9 ha)
- Built: 1917
- Architectural style: Classical Revival
- NRHP reference No.: 97001089
- Added to NRHP: September 4, 1997

The William Mizell Sr. House, on Garden Street (formerly was 101 Palm St.) in Folkston in Charlton County, Georgia, was built in 1917. It was listed on the National Register of Historic Places in 1997.

It has also been known as the Susie Fleming/Helen Sarbacher Property, and its listing included three contributing buildings and two contributing sites.

It is a two-story frame house with a one-story wraparound porch supported by paired Doric columns. The architectural style is a restrained version of Classical Revival style. It has a frame greenhouse from 1917 and a frame garage from 1940, which, at the time of NRHP listing, were both in damaged condition.

It was the home of it was the home of William Mizell Sr. (1852–1930) and his wife, Susie Jane Standiford Mizell (1859–1936). William Mizzell was a businessman who operated sawmills and established the Citizens' Bank in Folkston.
