= Floyds Island Hammock =

- U.S. National Register of Historic Places
- Location within Georgia Location within the United States
- Nearest city: Folkston, Georgia
- Coordinates: 30.85687°N 82.26686°W
- Area: 111 acres (0.45 km^{2})
- Built: 1901
- Built by: Daniel L. Hebard
- Architectural style: Late 19th And Early 20th Century American Movements
- NRHP reference No.: 00000389
- Added to NRHP: April 21, 2000

Floyds Island Hammock is a historic site in the swamp of the Okefenokee National Wildlife Refuge in Charlton County, Georgia. Also known as Hebard Cabin and Floyd's Cabin, it was listed on the National Register of Historic Places in 2000. The listing included a contributing building, a contributing structure (Railroad Piling & Bed), and four contributing sites (B. Spaulding Cabin Site (9Cr36), Cook's House Site, Guide's Hut Sites (3), and 9Cr2 (Floyds Island Mound)).
