= Elisha Hopkins House =

Historic house in Massachusetts, United States

- U.S. National Register of Historic Places
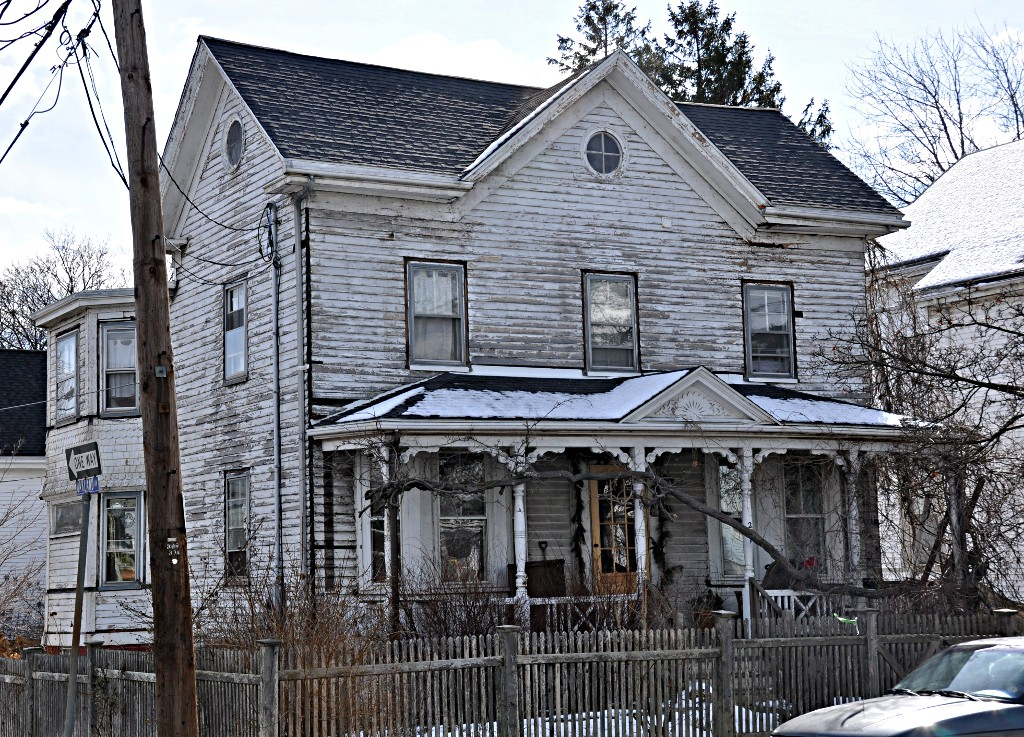

- Location within Massachusetts Location within the United States
- Location: 237 School Street, Somerville, Massachusetts
- Coordinates: 42°23′30.83″N 71°5′43.07″W
- Built: 1868
- Architectural style: Italianate
- MPS: Somerville MPS
- NRHP reference No.: 89001284
- Added to NRHP: September 18, 1989

The Elisha Hopkins House is a historic house in Somerville, Massachusetts. The 2.5-story wood-frame house was built c. 1868 by Elisha Hopkins, a ship's master. It has a typical period Italianate plan, with three bays across and small center gable. The gables have oculi windows characteristic of the style, and there is a later Colonial Revival front porch with turned posts and brackets, and a gable over the entry stair.

The house was listed on the National Register of Historic Places in 1989.

== See also ==
- National Register of Historic Places listings in Somerville, Massachusetts
