= Bernice, Louisiana =

- Town
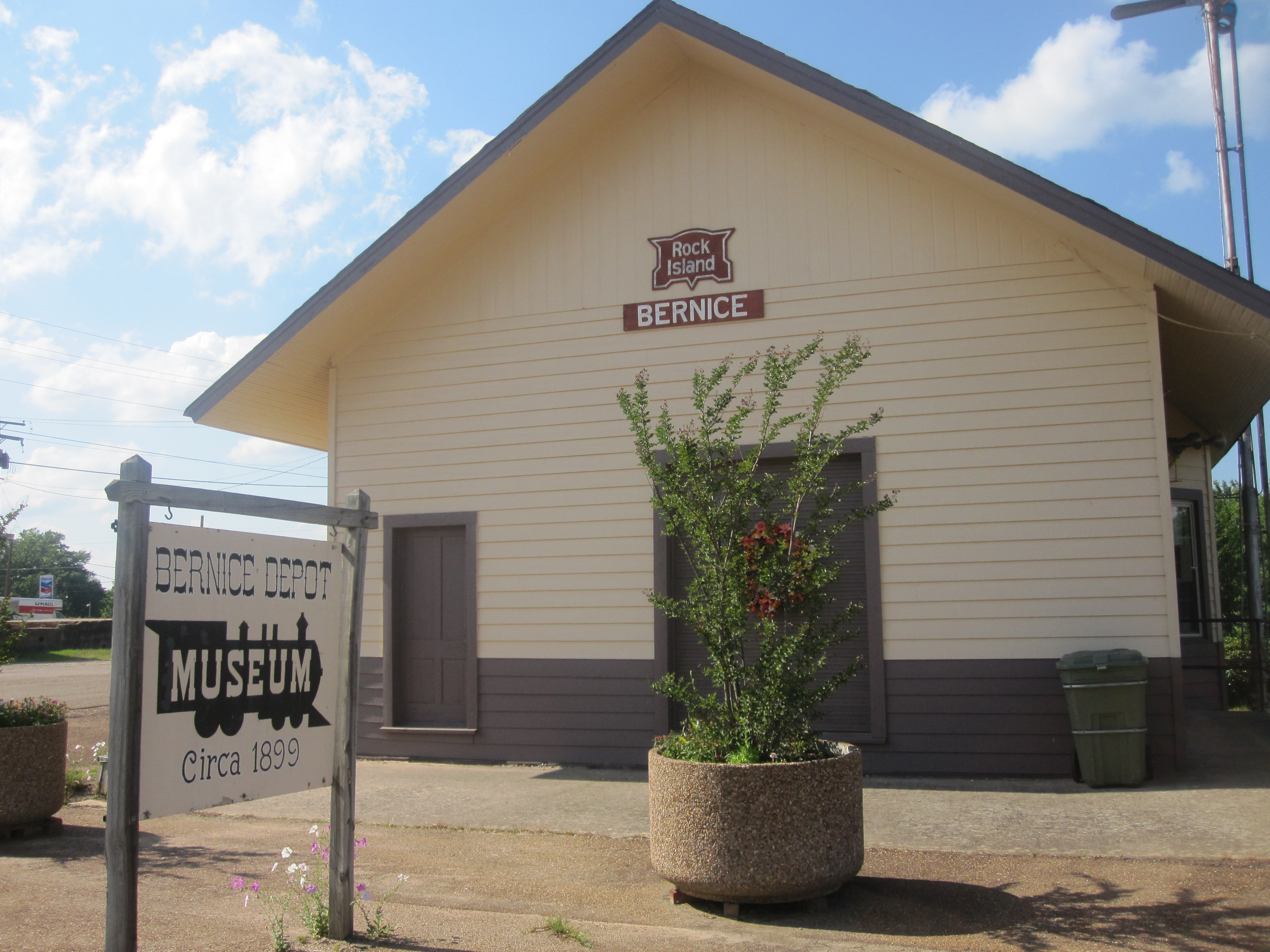
- Bernice Rock Island Railroad Depot Museum

- Location of Bernice in Union Parish, Louisiana.

- Location of Louisiana in the United States
- Coordinates: 32°49′40″N 92°39′30″W
- Country: United States
- State: Louisiana
- Parish: Union
- Founded: 1899

Government
  - Mayor: Mildred Ferguson (D)

Area
  - Total: 3.24 sq mi (8.39 km^{2})
  - Land: 3.22 sq mi (8.35 km^{2})
  - Water: 0.012 sq mi (0.03 km^{2})
- Elevation: 210 ft (64 m)

Population (2020)
  - Total: 1,356
  - Density: 420.4/sq mi (162.31/km^{2})
- Time zone: UTC-6 (CST)
  - Summer (DST): UTC-5 (CDT)
- ZIP code: 71222
- Area code: 318
- FIPS code: 22-07030
- GNIS feature ID: 2405249
- Website: bernicela.net

Bernice is a town in Union Parish, Louisiana, United States. As of the 2020 census, Bernice had a population of 1,356. It is part of the Monroe Metropolitan Statistical Area.

== History ==
The area was part of the Louisiana frontier and pine forests, but early houses survive from the mid-nineteenth century: among the oldest homes are the R.T. Moore/Gresham/Stenzel House, known as the "Sweet Onion", and McCuller Log Cabin, both circa 1865.

Bernice was established in 1899 as a sawmill town after Captain C.C. Henderson built the Arkansas Southern Railroad, the first railway in Union Parish. Also an agricultural trade center, Bernice is the youngest European-American town to be founded in the parish. The area was known as the "big woods" because of its large stands of huge virgin pine. Henderson built the railroad to enable harvesting of lumber from the area. Moving south from Junction City, he directed construction of the railroad to Winnfield.

Henderson sought to purchase property about a mile north of the present town from Henry Mabry, but they could not agree on the price. Henderson moved south and bought land from Allen Lowery and Dave Cole. He named his acquisition for Lowery's infant daughter, Bernice. On a late spring day, Henderson auctioned lots for the planned community.

Bernice was incorporated that same year, and the railroad depot was built soon after. A 1901 picture of Louisiana Street includes the depot, and a c. 1905 interior photograph shows the agent and several local citizens. Restored, today the station is operated as the Depot Museum, displaying a collection of Bernice memorabilia. It also serves as a tourist information center.

Jake Crews was the first mayor. He was a contractor who built many of the earliest homes. Still standing are his own 1900 house, now called the Caldwell Home and said to be the oldest house in town; the 1902 Garland/Reeder House; the 1903 J.W. Heard/Laurence/Patton House; and the 1904 Thomas Heard House. Other turn-of-the century structures are the Cook/Minter House, the John Roach House and the Rives/Lindsey Hotel. The first brick home in town was the Pollock/Martin House, which dates from the 1920s, as does the old Bernice Jail.

The circa 1895 Alabama Methodist Church is now listed on the National Register of Historic Places. The Lynn Log House was moved to its present location and reconstructed from an antebellum dogtrot house that once stood across the road.

Captain Henderson donated land to the town to be named Oakhurst Park. It was filled with oak trees surrounding a gazebo where public functions were held during the early years. In 1938, the Bernice Clubhouse was built in the park, and it remains in use today. Nearby was the childhood home of New York Knicks basketball great Willis Reed.

The original town, as laid out by Henderson, has recently been designated as the Bernice Historic District by the town council.

The first store was in a tent and run by a man named Nelson, and the next was a mercantile business in a box car, operated by Will Martin. Other merchants soon followed, many of them coming from Shiloh, and the Bank of Bernice was chartered in 1901. With lumber the major factor in the economy, usually one mill, and often two, have operated here. A saloon and pool hall were among the early businesses, and it was not unusual to see a fight among lumbermen on Saturday afternoons in the middle of the red dirt main street under the sycamore trees. In the early part of the century, the Bernice and Northwestern Railroad Company, also known as "the dummy line", headed northwesterly toward Summerfield to haul in the logs from the lumber camps along the way.

Although Bernice has changed from its rough and tumble early days, it still has a sawmill and a chip mill operating. The Lindsey warehouse complex of 63 buildings provides space for several timber-related industries. The town also has a hospital, a nursing home, a volunteer fire department, several churches, and numerous small businesses.

== Geography ==
According to the United States Census Bureau, the town has a total area of 3.2 square miles (8.3 km^{2}), of which 3.2 square miles (8.3 km^{2}) is land and 0.31% is water.

=== Major highways ===
- U.S. Highway 63/U.S. Highway 167
- Louisiana Highway 2

== Demographics ==
Historical population
Census	Pop.	Note	%±
1910	781		—
1920	862		10.4%
1930	965		11.9%
1940	1,071		11.0%
1950	1,524		42.3%
1960	1,641		7.7%
1970	1,794		9.3%
1980	1,956		9.0%
1990	1,543		−21.1%
2000	1,809		17.2%
2010	1,689		−6.6%
2020	1,356		−19.7%
2025 (est.)	1,305	▼	−3.8%
U.S. Decennial Census

Bernice racial composition as of 2020
Race	Number	Percentage
White (non-Hispanic)	319	23.53%
Black or African American (non-Hispanic)	796	58.7%
Native American	3	0.22%
Asian	3	0.22%
Pacific Islander	1	0.07%
Other/Mixed	31	2.29%
Hispanic or Latino	203	14.97%

As of the 2020 United States census, there were 1,356 people, 571 households, and 326 families residing in the town.

== Education ==
Residents are assigned to Union Parish Public Schools. The Bernice school which served grades K-12 closed in 2013, and all students throughout Union Parish attend schools in the parish seat, Farmerville.

== Notable people ==
- Benny Anders
- Robert Finley, musician
- Wahoo McDaniel, NFL player and professional wrestler
- Mooseman (né Lloyd Roberts III), musician, bassist for Body Count
- Dante Powell, stand-up comedian
- Willis Reed, NBA player
- Willie Robertson, reality television star
- Orlando Woolridge, NBA player
