= Hopkins Covered Bridge Farm =

- U.S. National Register of Historic Places
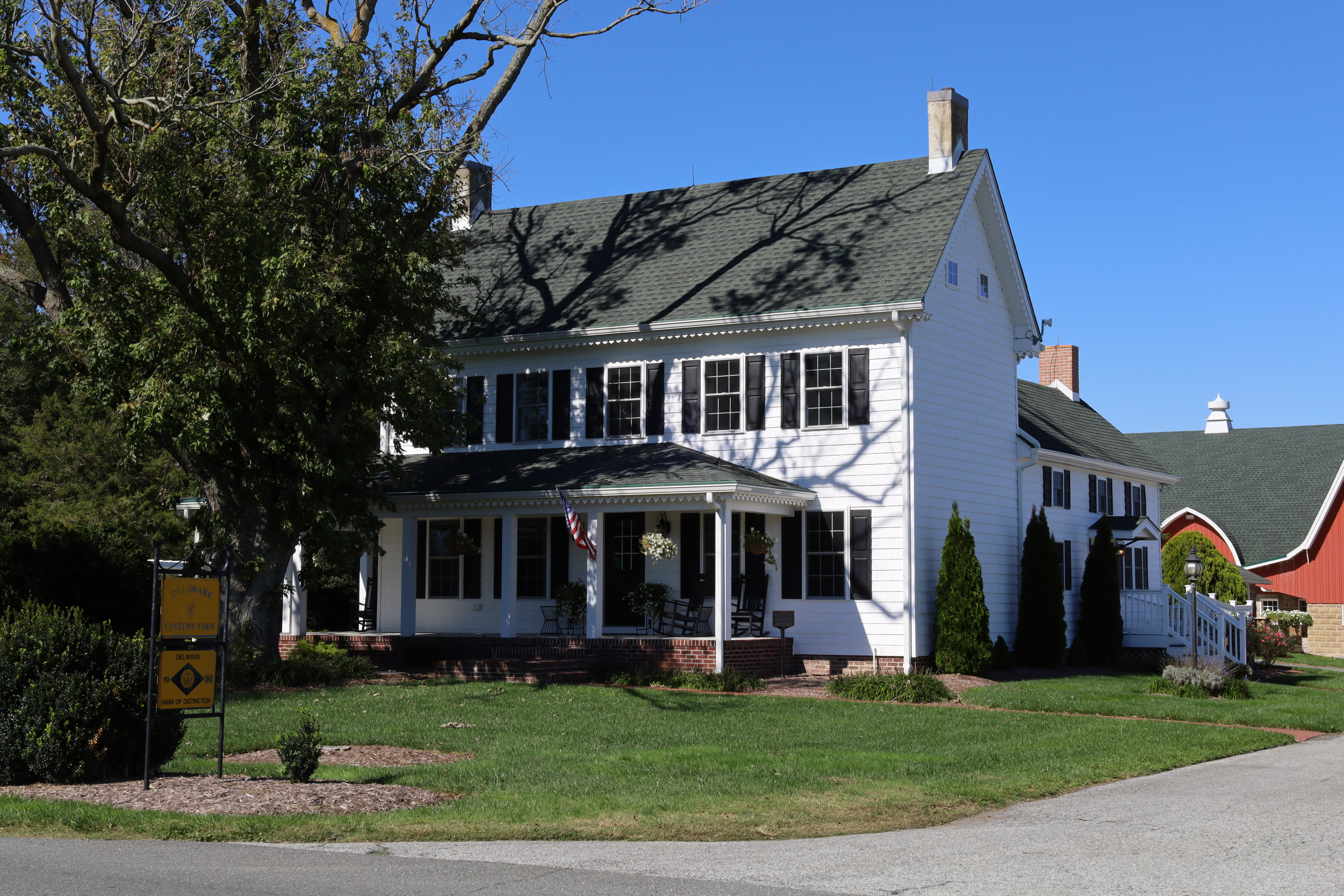

- Location within Delaware Location within the United States
- Location: Southwest of Lewes on U.S. Route 9, near Lewes, Delaware
- Coordinates: 38°43′10″N 75°13′14″W
- Area: 1 acre (0.40 ha)
- Built: c. 1868
- Architect: Rodney O'Neil
- Architectural style: Vernacular Gothic
- NRHP reference No.: 91000912
- Added to NRHP: August 2, 1991

Hopkins Covered Bridge Farm is a historic home and farm located near Lewes, Sussex County, Delaware. The house was built about 1868, and is a rectangular, two-story, five-bay, single-pile, center-hall passage, frame dwelling with vernacular Gothic style details. It has a rectangular, two-story, three-bay, single pile, center passage, frame ell or wing. Both sections have gable roofs. The front facade has a three-bay, hipped roof porch. Also on the property are a contributing dairy barn designed by Rodney O'Neil (1925, 1936), milk house (1925), and silo (c. 1938–1939).

It was added to the National Register of Historic Places in 1991.
