= Hopkins House (Tecumseh, Kansas) =

Historic house in Kansas, United States

- U.S. National Register of Historic Places
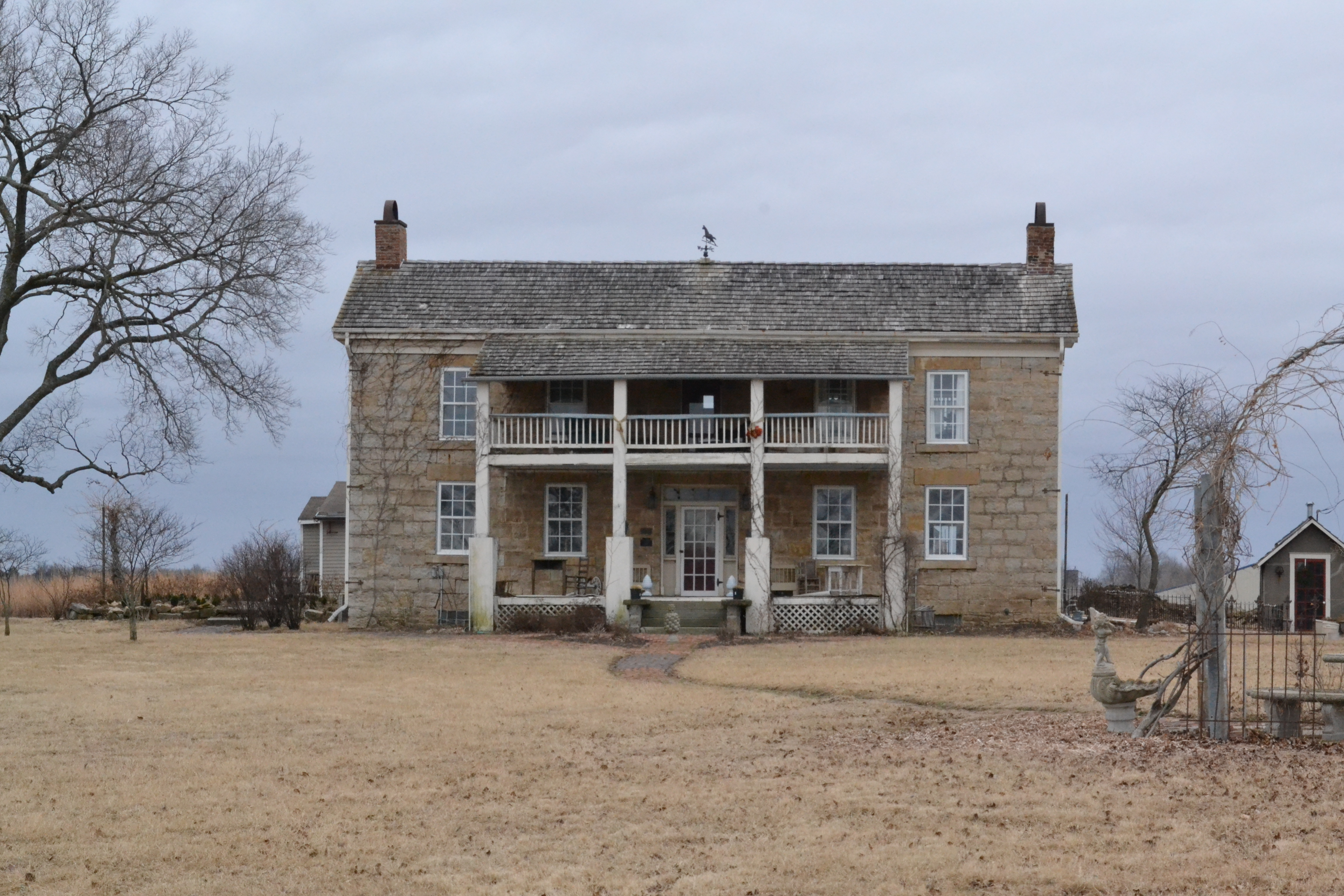

- Location within Kansas
- Location: Tecumseh, Kansas
- Coordinates: 39°02′37″N 95°33′20″W
- Area: 5.9 acres (2.4 ha)
- Built: 1859, 1920
- NRHP reference No.: 08001353
- Added to NRHP: January 16, 2009

The Hopkins House is located in Tecumseh, Kansas, USA. There are three contributing structures on the property; the house and barn, both built around 1859 and a coal shed built around 1920. The Greek Revival style limestone house has brick chimneys and a wooden porch. It is significant for its rare (for Kansas) architecture, its associations with the life of early settler Eli Hopkins and its reflection of the history of territorial Kansas. It was listed on the National Register of Historic Places in January, 2009.

It was listed as a featured property of the week in a program of the National Park Service that began in July, 2008.
