= Daniel Stein House =

Historic house in Louisiana, United States

- U.S. National Register of Historic Places
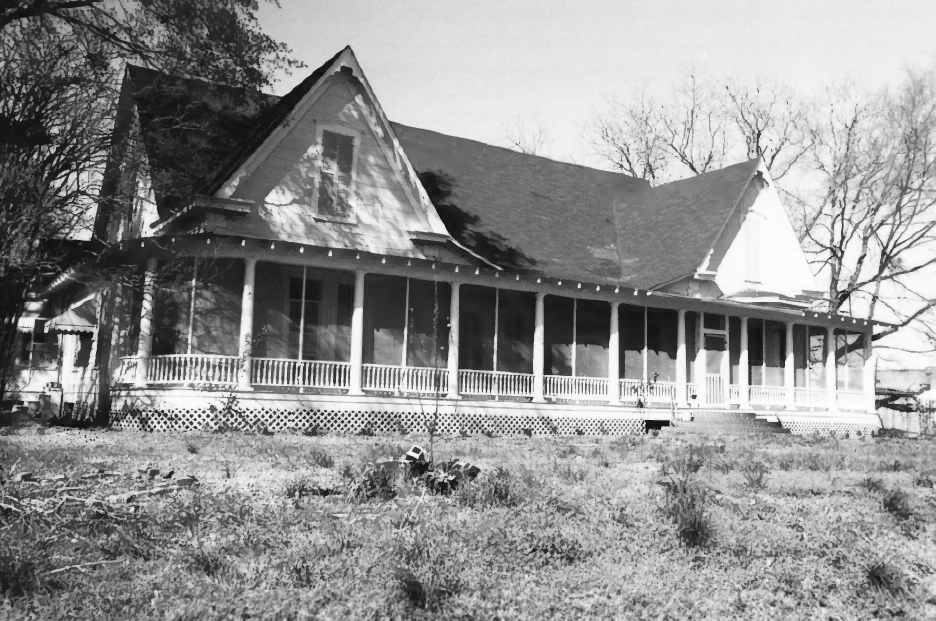

- Location within Louisiana Location within the United States
- Location: 208 W. Bayou, Farmerville, Louisiana
- Coordinates: 32°46′31″N 92°24′29″W
- Area: less than one acre
- Built: c.1875
- Architectural style: Italianate, Gothic Revival
- NRHP reference No.: 88000899
- Added to NRHP: June 23, 1988

The Daniel Stein House in Farmerville, Louisiana was built in about 1875. It was listed on the National Register of Historic Places in 1988.

== History ==
It has also been known as Baughman House. It is one of few surviving houses in Union Parish, Louisiana to represent pre-Queen Anne style.
