= William Hopkins House =

Historic house in Idaho, United States

- U.S. National Register of Historic Places
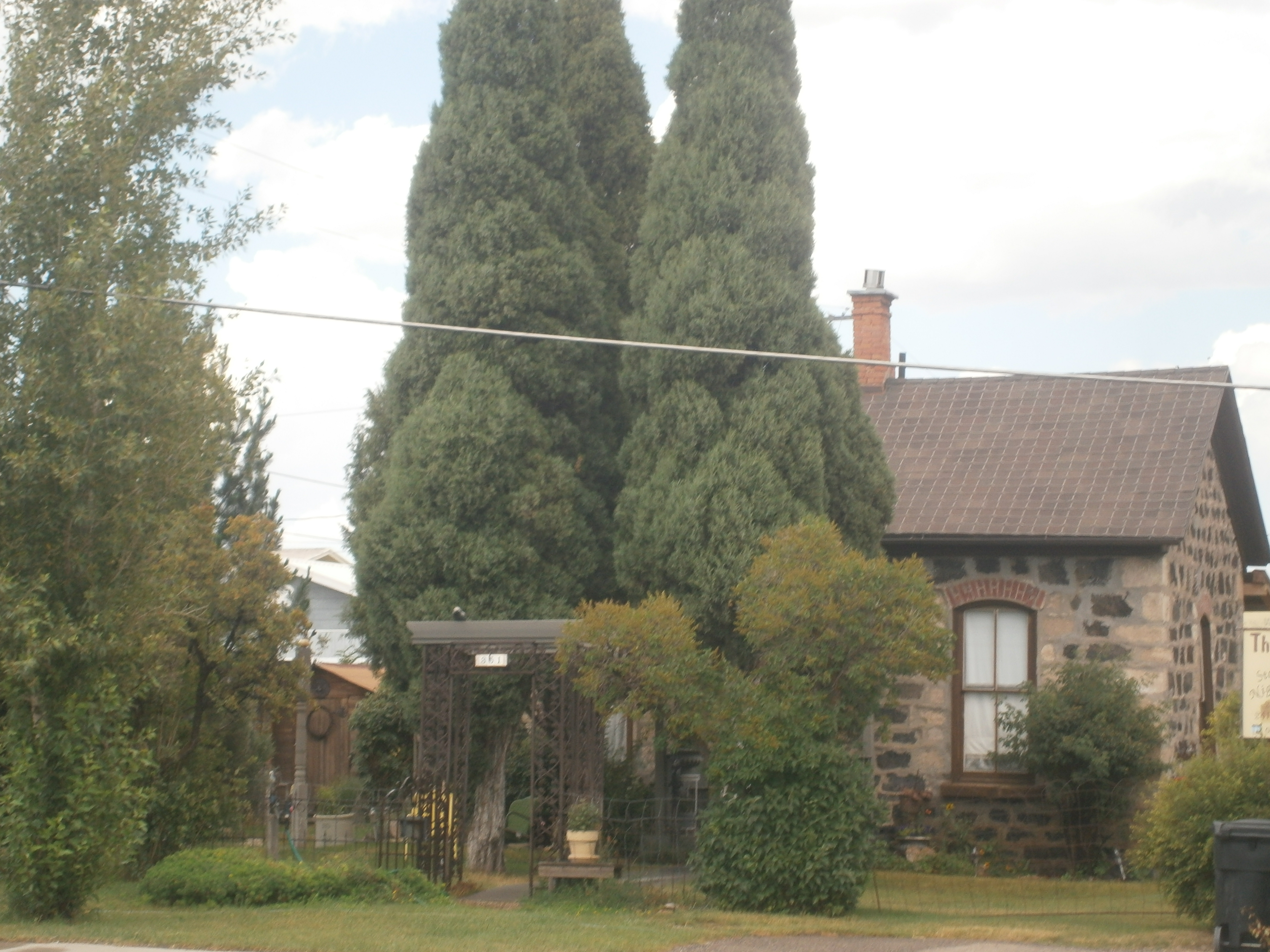

- Location within Idaho Location within the United States
- Location: E. Hooper Ave., Soda Springs, Idaho
- Coordinates: 42°39′33″N 111°35′33″W
- Area: less than one acre
- Built: 1896
- NRHP reference No.: 79000787
- Added to NRHP: January 8, 1979

The William Hopkins House was listed on the National Register of Historic Places in 1979.

Its NRHP nomination stated:

The Hopkins residence is typical of vernacular stone architecture applied on an extremely modest scale to accommodate the needs of the frontier bachelor or family of two. Being of such a small scale its significance has all too frequently been ignored with the result this sort of structure is becoming a disappearing segment of the Idaho landscape. The Hopkins residence is the best example of its genre in Soda Springs and one of the more intact examples of its style in the state we have found in the course of our survey of the state to date.
