= Hopkins Farm (Pittsford, New York) =

- U.S. National Register of Historic Places
- U.S. Historic district
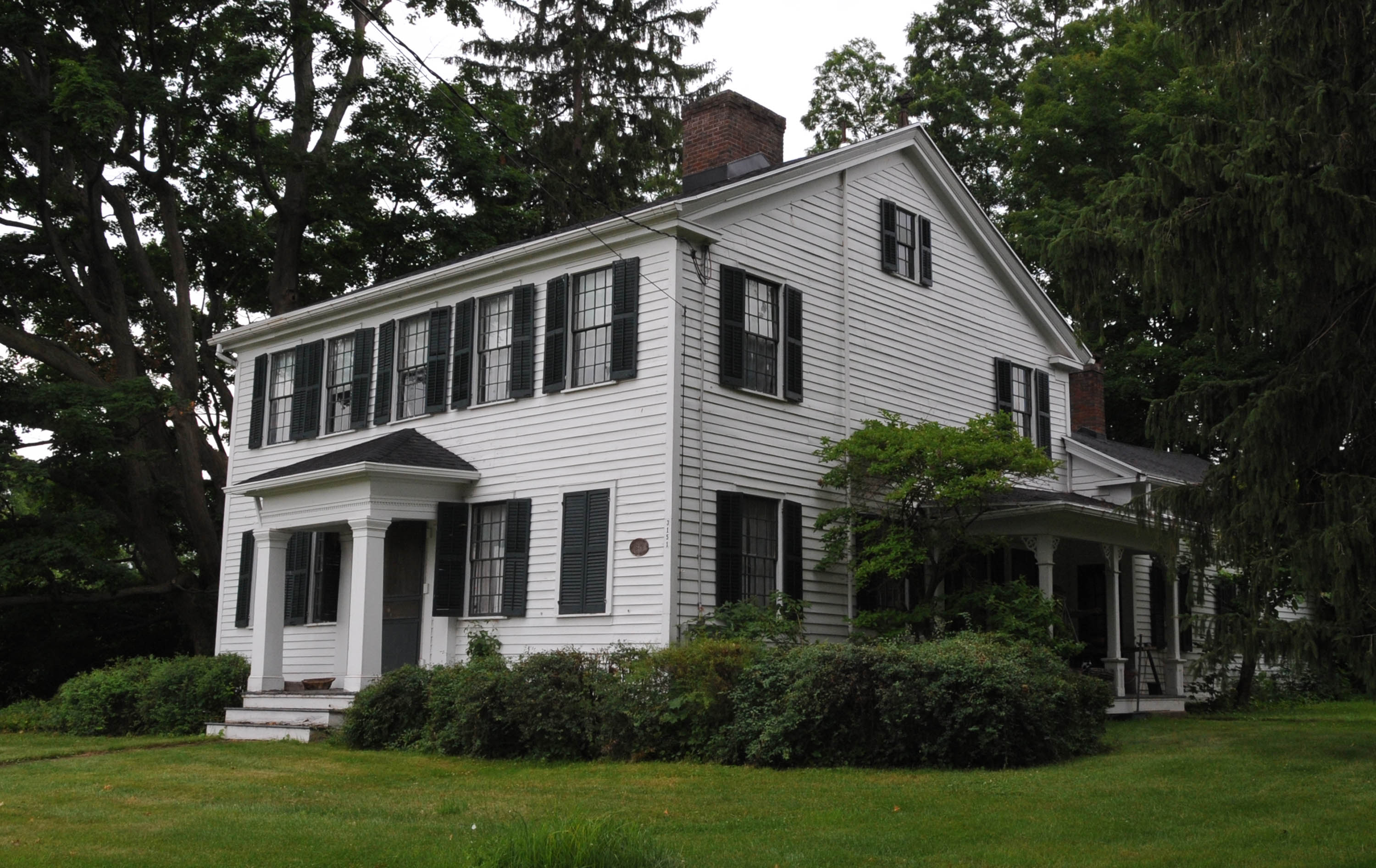

- Location within New York Location within the United States
- Nearest city: Pittsford, New York
- Coordinates: 43°3′40″N 77°33′28″W
- Area: 370 acres (150 ha)
- Built: 1815
- Architectural style: Federal, Greek Revival
- NRHP reference No.: 00001153
- Added to NRHP: October 06, 2000

Hopkins Farm is a national historic district and farm complex located at Pittsford in Monroe County, New York, United States. It consists of 15 contributing buildings, eight contributing structures, and one contributing site on a 370-acre (150 ha) farm. The largest group of structures are clustered around the farmhouse, built about 1815 in a vernacular Federal style, and includes two barns, several outbuildings, and two tenant houses.

It was listed on the National Register of Historic Places in 2000.
