= Alabama Methodist Church =

Historic church in Louisiana, United States

- U.S. National Register of Historic Places
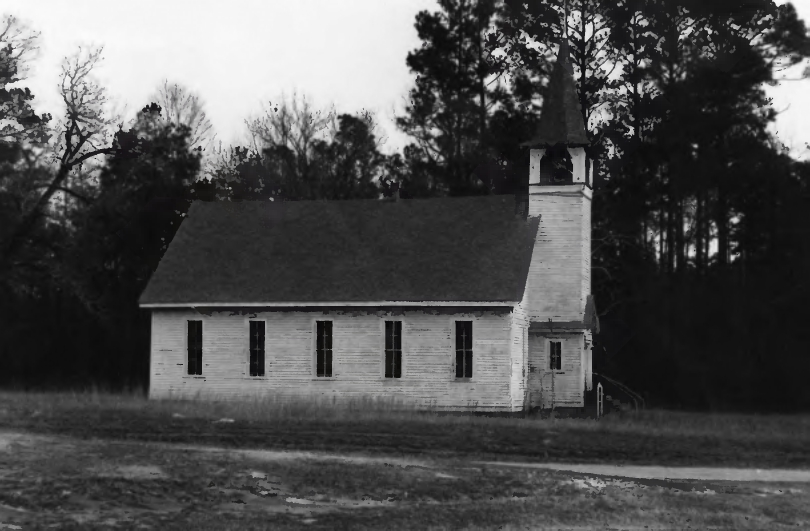

- Location within Louisiana Location within the United States
- Nearest city: Bernice, Louisiana
- Coordinates: 32°51′35″N 92°43′31″W
- Area: 3 acres (1.2 ha)
- NRHP reference No.: 95000298
- Added to NRHP: March 30, 1995

Alabama Methodist Church is a historic church on Louisiana Highway Alt. 2 a few miles northwest of the small town of Bernice in Union Parish, Louisiana, United States. It was added to the National Register of Historic Places in 1995.

The church was founded in 1849 by settlers from Shelby County, Alabama who built a log building. The present church was built in 1895, and features a central office tower with an open belfry. As of 1995, the tower leaned a bit to the right as one faces the church. It has five windows on each side, with four-over-four glass, and a small two-over-two window on each side of the first level of the tower.

The church had not been in use since the 1960s, when it was preserved by the Bernice Bicentennial Committee in 1976, which led to the creation of the Alabama Methodist Church Corporation, which eventually gave ownership of the church to the Bernice Historical Society in 1994.

In 1995, it was deemed notable as a well-preserved and rare example of a simple frame country church in North Louisiana, which was settled by Anglo-Saxon Baptists and Methodists in the 1840s and 1850s.
