= John M. Hopkins Cabin =

Historic house in Georgia, United States

- Hopkins, John M., Cabin
- U.S. National Register of Historic Places
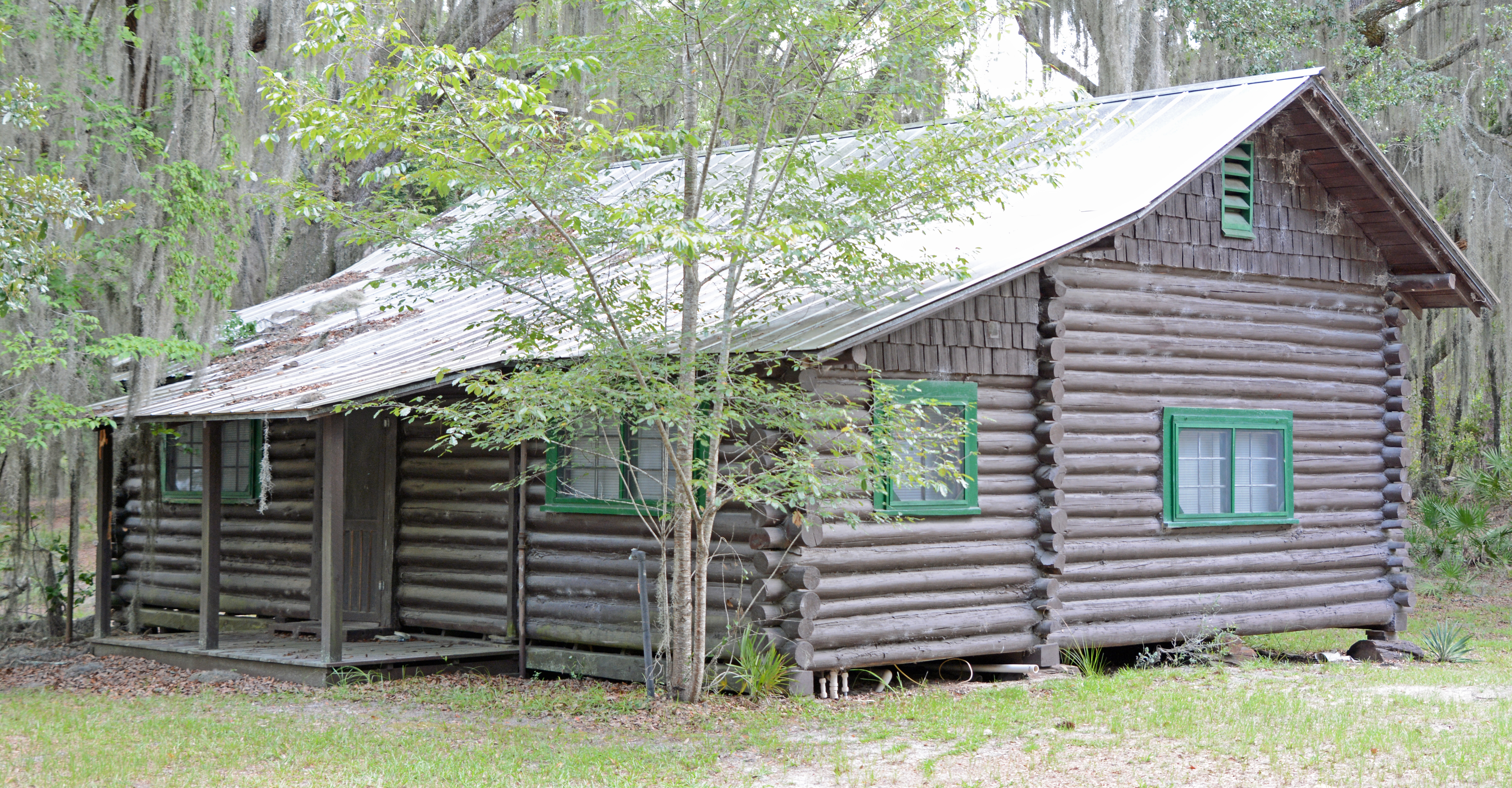

- Location within Georgia Location within the United States
- Location: Off GA 121/23, SW of Folkston, Charlton County, Georgia
- Coordinates: 30.738611°N 82.128056°W
- Area: 1 acre (0.40 ha)
- Built: 1927
- Built by: Hebard Cypress Company Employees
- NRHP reference No.: 83000186
- Added to NRHP: March 4, 1983

The John M. Hopkins Cabin, located in the Okefenokee National Wildlife Refuge south of Folkston, Georgia, off GA 121/23 in Charlton County, Georgia, is a log cabin built in 1927. It was listed on the National Register of Historic Places in 1983.

It is a 30 by 24 feet (9.1 m × 7.3 m) house built of end-notched heart pine logs, with a foundation of hexagonal heart pine blocks. It has also been known as Quarters #12 - Guest Cabin.
