= Hopkins House (Marion, Louisiana) =

Historic house in Louisiana, United States

- U.S. National Register of Historic Places
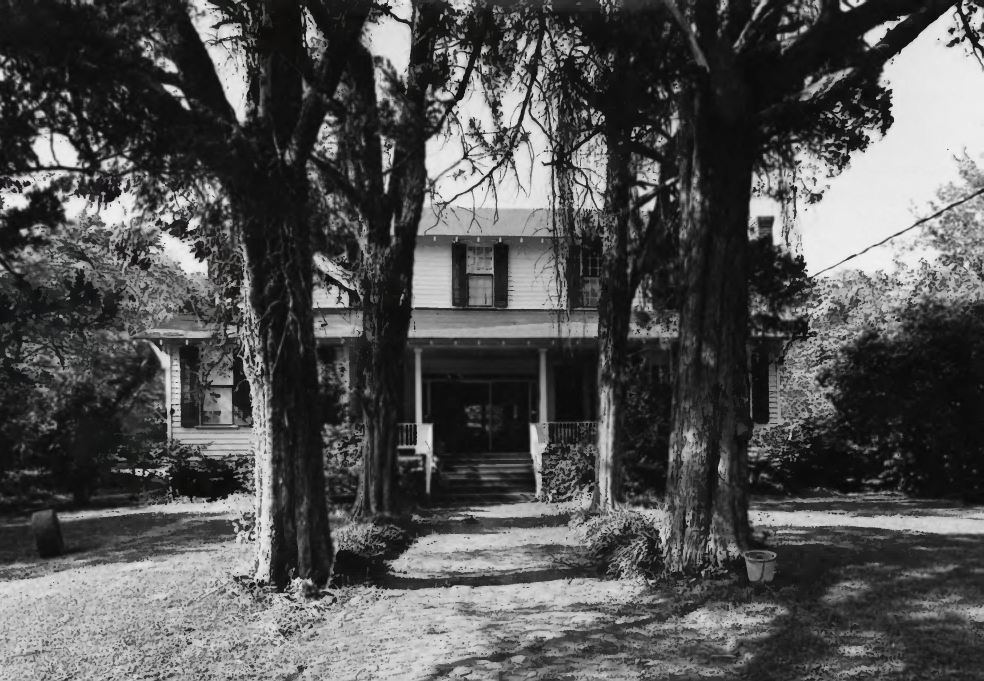

- Location within Louisiana Location within the United States
- Location: Hopkins Lane, Marion, Louisiana
- Coordinates: 32°54′10″N 92°14′25″W
- Area: 2 acres (0.81 ha)
- Built: c. 1850
- Built by: John Thomas
- Architectural style: Carolina I
- NRHP reference No.: 83000549
- Added to NRHP: March 14, 1983

The Hopkins House in Marion, Louisiana was built as the home of Rev. Elias George, a Baptist Minister and cotton planter. It was built by an artisan slave named John Thomas in 1850. Reverend George and his family occupied the until 1866 when he sold it to his daughter Susan and her husband Lewis M. Powell. It was listed on the National Register of Historic Places in 1983.

It is significant at the state level as an example of Carolina I architecture.
