= Scottsville Free Library =

- Windom Hall
- U.S. National Register of Historic Places
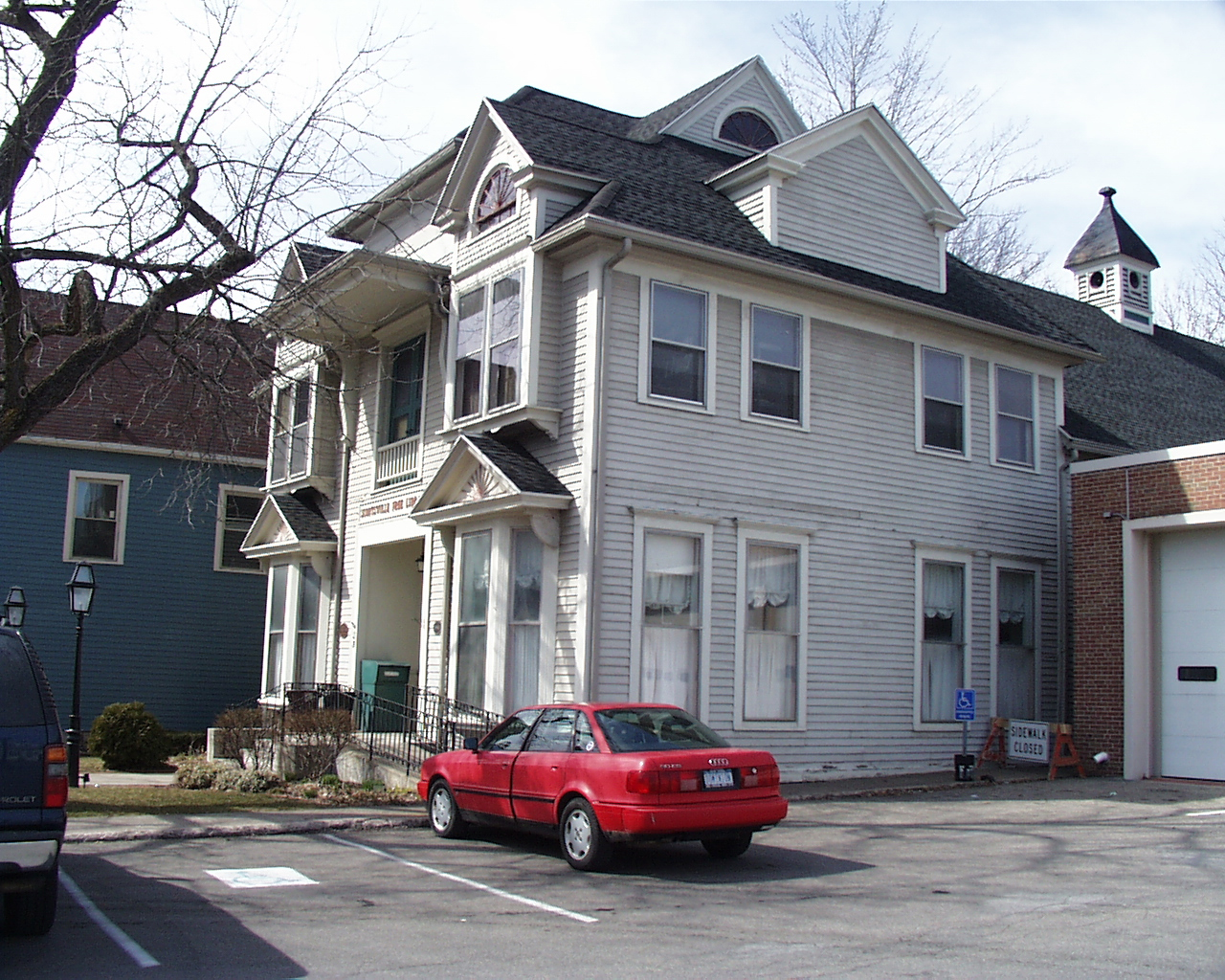

- Location within New York
- Location: 28 Main Street, Scottsville, New York
- Coordinates: 43°1′11″N 77°45′1″W
- Built: 1892
- Architects: Charles H. Ellis; Myron Pope
- Architectural style: Queen Anne
- NRHP reference No.: 94000803
- Added to NRHP: August 5, 1994

The Scottsville Free Library, located at 28 Main Street in the village of Scottsville, New York, with a small branch at 883 George Street in Mumford, serves the people of the towns of Wheatland and Chili, as well as adjacent areas in Monroe County.

Unlike most public libraries, the Scottsville Free Library has always been a private non-profit association. Membership in this association is open to all local residents: one need merely apply for a library card. A board of seven trustees, elected by the association members to three-year terms, provides governance for the association.

== History ==
=== Background ===
The history of the library has been admirably written by Carl F Schmidt, an architect locally noted for his histories of the area, and George Engs Slocum, a local figure whose history of the town appeared in the very early 20th century. (The original publication of Slocum's history was by private printing of three hundred fifty copies in Scottsville, by Isaac Van Hooser. In 1998 (Slocum) and 2002 (Schmidt), the Wheatland Historical Association commissioned the Higginson reprints.)

Schmidt wrote in 1952–1953, while Slocum stopped in 1906.

=== Antecedence ===
In 1796, the state legislature enacted a law providing for the establishment of local private subscription libraries.

==== Farmers' Library ====
The Scottsville Free Library's beginnings may be traced back to The Farmers' Library, founded on 6 January 1805 and the first institution of its kind in the western part of New York State. At its heart, a lending library is its collection of books. In the days before newspapers, reliable postal service, and other forms of communication, books comprised one of very few connections to the outside world. The Farmers' Library began when John Garbutt walked to Canandaigua and returned with twenty-three books purchased from the Myron Holley Store.

The first twenty-two books were:

- "Morse's Universal Geography"
- Nine volumes of "The Spectator" by Addison and Steele
- Two volumes of Paley's "Philosophy"
- Two volumes of Beattie's "Elements of Moral Science"
- "Arabian Nights"
- Two volumes of "Mackenzie's Voyages"
- Baxter's "The Saints' Everlasting Rest"
- "History of England" by Oliver Goldsmith
- "Boston's View"
- Franklin's works
- "The American Revolution"

Eventually, this collection grew to some fifteen hundred forty-seven volumes, and the Society which was founded to support and manage the library also thrived, with ample public support. For its first two years, the library lived in the home of Peter Sheffer, Jr; for the next two, with Cyrus Douglass.

In an analysis of the history of The Farmers' Library by Philip B. Daghlian in the University of Rochester Library Bulletin (Volume II · November 1946 · Number 1), this observation is made about the selection of books: "It might be observed in passing that the tastes which are reflected in this instance would do credit to a community with far greater claims to culture and sophistication." Daghlian further observed, "One can see from this sampling that the founders of The Farmers' Library were interested in substantial reading matter, principally in the categories of philosophy and religion, history and travel, belles-lettres, and the practical arts. This is the basic pattern followed throughout the history of the organization, although in later years it was the custom to purchase current publications almost exclusively. It is not likely that any of the readers regarded themselves as intellectuals, and yet their reading tastes would be highly respectable in any age. And the condition of the surviving books proves that they were really read."

A provision of the Society's by-laws stipulated that "the library should forever be kept within two miles of the bridge over Allan's Creek on Isaac Scott's farm." Allan's Creek eventually became Oatka Creek, and this restriction also passed into history in 1810, when the library was moved to Albright's Mill at Hall's Corners (today's Wheatland Center). In 1816, it was moved again, from Wheatland Center to Garbutt's Mills, housed in Garbutt's store at times and in private residences at other times, under the care of Phillip Garbutt.

The founders of The Farmers' Library included:

- Peter Sheffer - was the first serious settler in the area, after the flighty and eccentric Indian Allan. Peter Sheffer, Sr, purchased 475 acres on the river flats for the then-high price of $2.50 an acre. Peter Sheffer, Jr, was the first non-Indian to be married west of the Genesee. Like many others, he built a grist mill, this one in Garbuttsville. Unlike most of the others, this one would eventually be converted to grinding gypsum when workmen excavating the foundation for a new mill discovered the local gypsum deposit, thus opening up a lucrative new industry.
- Isaac Scott - came to the area from New Hampshire at the age of forty-five in 1790 and purchased 150 acres from the Wadsworth family for $4.00 an acre; this land is now the village of Scottsville. His log cabin, built north of the creek on what is now the corner of Main Street and River Road (originally Canawaugus Road), was the village's first structure. It eventually became the first of the village's numerous hotels.
- Cyrus Douglass - married one of Isaac Scott's daughters. As one of the Commissioners of Highways, he assisted in the construction of the first road in the Town of Northampton, running northwest to Braddock Bay. Shortly after the turn of the 20th century, he moved to the new state of Indiana.
- James Wood - was the Commissioner of Highways in 1803 when Wheatland was still Southampton and part of Genesee County.
- John Finch - worked as Scottsville's first blacksmith, a trade far more economically important than quaint. A man of highly regarded intellectual depth, he served as Caledonia's supervisor in 1812 and eventually went out west in 1820.
- Christopher Laybourn - settled in 1799 or 1800 and was town supervisor for the four years during which the town was known as Southampton. His farm was the site, in 1810, of the first military training in the area. The following year, he sold out and moved to Illinois.
- John Garbutt - born in England in 1780, came to America in 1798 after his father was persecuted for his Whig politics. He arrived in the area in 1804 and left his name spread liberally across the history of Wheatland. He was, among other things, a shoemaker, a farmer, a surveyor, a politician, and a begetter of sons. He was town supervisor for Caledonia in 1820 and Wheatland's first supervisor in 1821. He also instigated the change of the town's name from Inverness to Wheatland. In 1829, he went to the state legislature as one of Monroe County's representatives. His death in 1855 matched the library's semi-centennial.
- Francis Albright - came to Wheatland from Seneca County in 1799 and settled near the town's center. In 1804, he constructed a small grist mill, the first in Wheatland and the first of many on the Oatka. The mill was extremely successful, at least up to the day it burned to the ground in 1875, a fate to which virtually all of Oatka Creek's mills would eventually succumb. He served as the library's custodian from 1810 to 1816, eventually moving to Niagara County, where he lived 'til 1840.
- Powell Carpenter - arrived in the area in 1804 from Westchester County. Before dying in 1853, he participated actively in numerous local business undertakings. After Isaac Scott died in 1818 at the age of 73, his tavern was briefly operated by his son until its purchase by Carpenter in 1820.
- Nathaniel Taylor - was an old bachelor who lived in Garbuttsville, teaching school at Belcoda. His sole claim to fame was his marriage to one of his pupils, the disparity in their ages occasioning considerable disapprobation among the local citizenry. Their wedding trip took them to the far west; it is not recorded whether they ever came back.

Membership (under the terms of the organization's constitution, each member was called a proprietor) in the library came, initially, at a cost of a dollar and a half; at the time, this was the price of a pair of long gloves, a long scythe, a pair of worsted stockings (long?), eight hens, three yards of towel cloth, or three gallons of whiskey. This fee was later doubled. In addition to the membership subscription, the annual dues varied between half a dollar and a dollar. Only in 1822 were non-members allowed to borrow from the library, albeit at an annual fee. The organization was incorporated on 31 May 1811.

The rationale for locating the library in grist mills was simple: the first facility to be built by settlers after their own housing was the mill which ground grist into meal or flour. Farmers naturally congregated at the mill, spending time talking whilst waiting for their grain to be ground. (To a limited degree, this can still be seen today.) Thus, this proved the optimal site for the local library.

==== Scottsville Library ====
In 1839, when the nascent Scottsville library first appeared, The Farmers' Library was divided between Scottsville and Garbuttsville. The members from Scottsville took their books away, establishing a new library in Ira Carpenter's store. This was located in the front half of that part of the municipal building which until recently housed the fire department. In fact, it was literally within spitting distance of the present library building. This smaller and vitiated library did not last; interest in it diminished, along with membership, and, several years later, the books were sold at auction and the proceeds distributed among the shareholders.

The thousand or so volumes belonging to the Garbuttsville faction stayed with Philip Garbutt. They remained in his store until 1866, at which time William Garbutt, Philip's son, took them into his residence, where they were kept until 16 November 1934, when Mrs Eleanor M Garbutt, Pittsford, NY, sold them to the University of Rochester library. The Farmers' Library, itself, ended in 1870.

=== The Scottsville Village Improvement Society ===
Founded in 1911 to encourage all local women to participate in civic betterment efforts, the Scottsville Village Improvement Society took an active interest in the matter of a local library. With leadership and financial support from Mrs Etta Fraser Miller, the Society opened the Reading Room on Main Street. At first precisely what the name implies, a place where one could go to sit and read, the Reading Room occupied the Society's clubroom in the Woodgate home at 29 Main. Access was open to anyone, and the Reading Room's collection included books and periodicals for all ages. Public acceptance of the Reading Room encouraged the Society to expand it into a circulating library. The success of the newly formed Scottsville Free Library was measured in the more than four thousand visits during the first year.

In 1914, Mrs Miller's son, R T Miller Jr, assisted the Society (see below) in the acquisition of Windom Hall. Two years later, the Society offered the West Room of Windom Hall to the library, as it had outgrown its space at 29 Main Street. At this juncture, the Reading Room had some five hundred volumes, all of which moved across the street into a room charitably described by its occupants as not unduly warm in winter.

The state granted the library a provisional charter in 1916 upon the establishment by Miss Sophia Miller and Miss Ruth Hanford, along with nearly two dozen other Scottsvillians, of the Scottsville Free Library Association. This enabled the library to receive its first public financial assistance, $100 in state aid, with the proviso that it be spent on the purchase of approved books. By now president of the library's Board of Trustees, Miss Miller urged the library to move to the second floor of Windom Hall, where it would have greater space. This was done in 1919, and it led to greater use of the library.

=== The current building ===
Following the end of the Scottsville Library in 1840, half a century passed without anything to take its place. Then, a number of concerned citizens and several teachers at the Scottsville Union School organized an effort which collected four hundred dollars for a library to serve both the school and the community.

Carl F Schmidt writes -

"The Scottsville Improvement Society was organized in September 1911, with sixty-four members. The object of the society was the civic improvement of the village and the town. In 1915, the society wanted to buy Windom Hall, which could be obtained for the sum of $2,500. R T Miller, Jr, offered the society one-half of the money, provided the members raised a like amount. They soon accomplished their objective and became owners of the building on Main Street, which today is the home of the Scottsville Free Library.

For years there had been a need for a library, and Roscoe Brown tried to do something about it. He started a library in his own home and loaned books. The Scottsville Improvement Society took over this work; after the purchase of Windom Hall, a library and reading room were maintained on the second floor.

The Scottsville Free Library was organized in January 1916, and a charter was granted by the State Board of Regents a month later. The Scottsville Improvement Society then deeded the Windom Hall property to the Scottsville Free Library. Miss Sophia Miller was elected the first president."

The Scottsville Free Library today occupies the former Windom Hall. Designed by architect Charles Ellis of Rochester and constructed in 1891–1892 by builder Myron Pope and mason Isaac Leake, it has seen many usages for commercial, professional, and public functions and enterprises. Its initial purpose was as a village hall, in the old sense of the term. To this end, James H Kelly acquired the old William Hanford House at 28 Main Street and demolished it; in its place, a new building was constructed. It opened on 17 February 1892, with a reception, supper, and dance. On the following two days, the Scottsville Dramatic Club performed the play, "Above the Clouds".

The rooms of Windom Hall did more than serve as a venue for civic events. A dentist named Stevenson practiced his profession in one of the rooms from 1895 to 1898. Another dentist, Herbert W Boylan, opened his first practice in the East Room of Windom Hall, now the Children's Room of the library. In another room on the west side of the hall, Thomas Brown III founded and ran a bank in 1904. (It failed shortly thereafter.) In 1898 and 'til 1918, a room on the east side of Windom Hall was home to the Scottsville post office.

The Scottsville Library Association operated from the second floor until 1937. By that time, the demand for its services necessitated moving downstairs to the greater space available on the first floor. The automatic chimes atop the hall were donated to the village by Romanta T Miller Jr, along with the paneled oak memorial on the rear (north) wall of the first floor stage on which are written the more than five hundred fifty names of local men and women who served in the military, from the Revolutionary War through World War 2. (This memorial was designed by architect Carl F Schmidt, the author of History of the Town of Wheatland.)

In 1950, the town board appointed Mrs Miriam Bischetsreider town nurse, with an office in Windom Hall. Like much of what made the history of Wheatland a fascinating picture of the evolution of the American culture, the concept of town nurse is today an unheard-of anachronism.

Currently, the Wheatland Historical Association maintains a repository of local historical resources in the Cox Local History Room (formerly the West Room and the first home of the library in Windom Hall), with hours of 1:30pm to 4:30pm and 7:00pm to 8:30pm on Tuesdays.

The building is listed on the National Register of Historic Places.

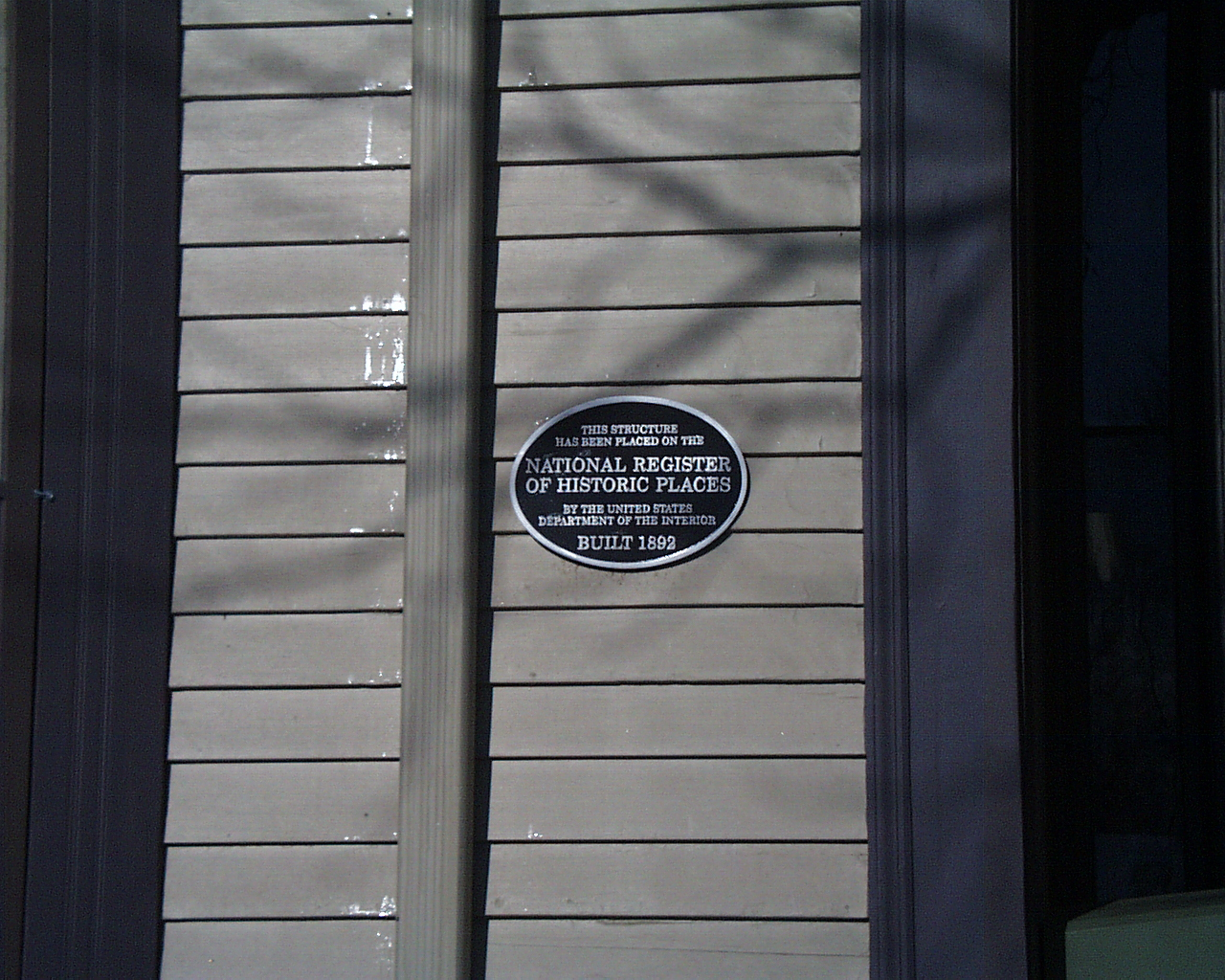

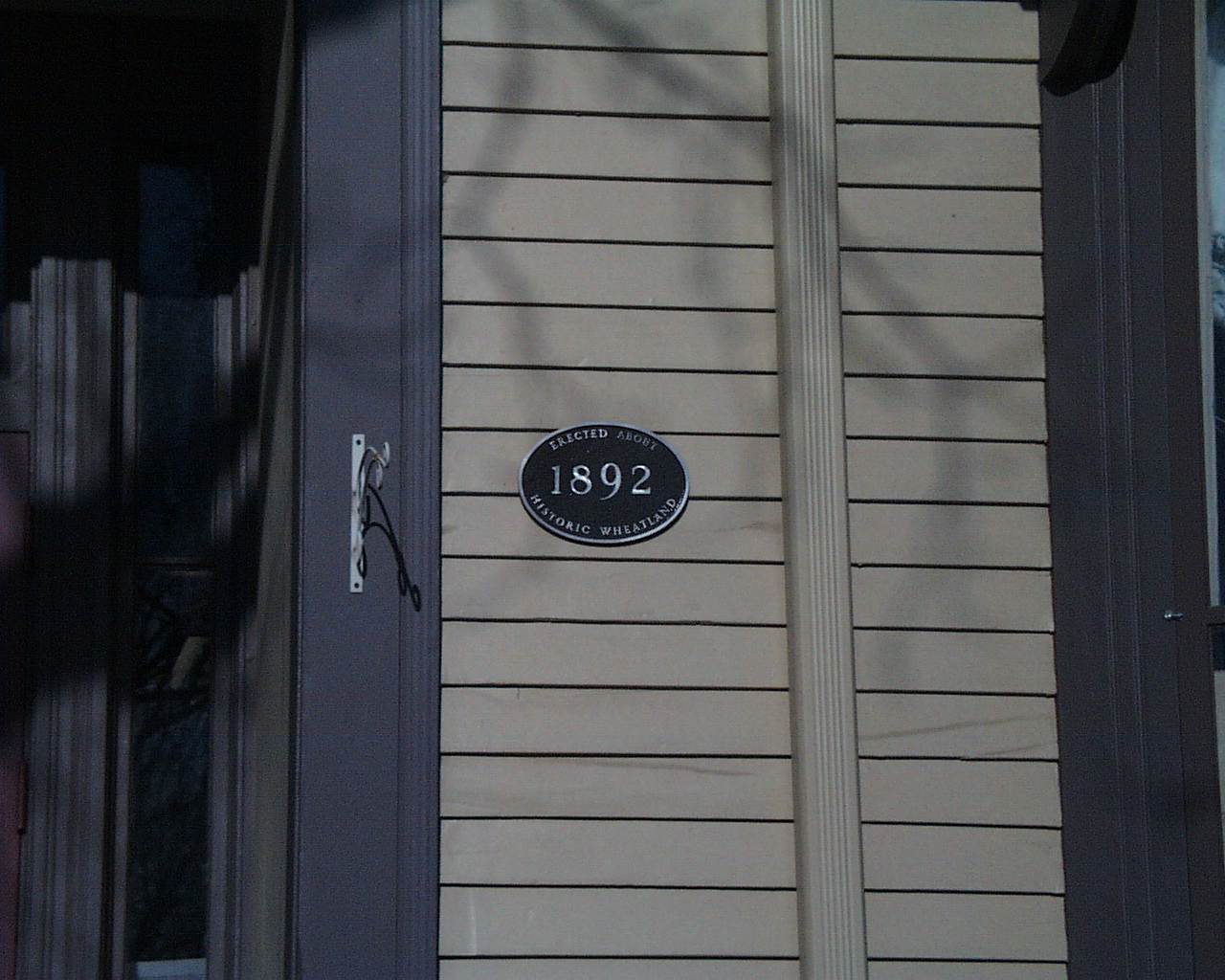

== Collections and services ==
Currently, the library in Scottsville has some 30,600 volumes and circulates more than 61,000 items annually, with a service population of a little more than 5,100 people. As a member of the Monroe County library system, it has access to the resources of all of the county's libraries.

== Staff ==
In addition to the Director, the library employs eight part-time librarians, one of whom serves as bookkeeper. The library is open for limited hours six days a week.

== Funding ==
Throughout its history, the library has avoided public funding, preferring to maintain its independence.

In addition to contributions from the public, endowments from Romanta T Miller Jr, have sustained the library, with significant gifts in 1943 and 1955. In both instances, the gift required small matching donations by the village and town governments. In 1960, the F G Ebsary Foundation provided a grant of $5,000, which was spent on a large room for children's materials. In subsequent years, the Ebsary Foundation has continued to support the library, helping to pay for building maintenance, a roof, the heating system, new paint, and wiring. The Eugene Cox memorial fund underwrote the history room bearing his name.

Rising costs obliged the library trustees to ask the village and town governments for greater assistance. This request, in 1968, resulted in annual support from the village of $875 and from the town $10,000. The town eventually assumed the entire responsibility for assistance, with the amount rising to $50,000 in 1986. Improvements in operating efficiency over the years have also been implemented.

== Branch ==
The library maintains a branch in Mumford in the Donnelly House; it has approximately 12,000 items.

== See also ==
- National Register of Historic Places listings in Monroe County, New York
