= Scottsville and LeRoy Railroad =

Horse-drawn railroad from Scottsville to Caledonia, New York State, US

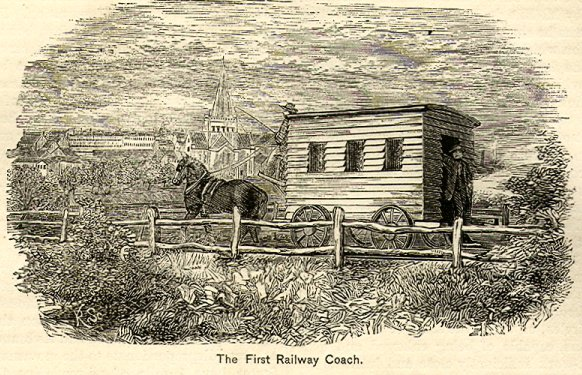

The Scottsville and LeRoy Railroad was a horse-drawn short-line railroad running from Scottsville to Caledonia, in New York State, in the United States of America. It was chartered in 1836 and ran until 1840, when changes in the canal system reduced demand. The eight-mile long line used wooden rails, which were a continual source of derailments.

== Origins ==
According to historian George Slocum:

Horse cars were used upon this road for two seasons, principally to bring flour and plaster from the mills upon its line to Scottsville for shipment. Forty thousand dollars was expended and lost in this venture. This road was exclusively a Wheatland undertaking; its corporators and stockholders were residents of this town. In its inception the building of this road was no visionary scheme. It was intended by its projectors to push on to Batavia and the west, and to connect at Canandaigua with the road then in process of construction from Auburn to that village. Those engaged in this project were men of enterprise and broad views, and were eminently worthy of if they did not achieve success.

The following text comes from History of the Town of Wheatland, by Carl F Schmidt, 1953.

Farmers were raising large crops, and more and more land was being cultivated. They wanted better means to get their products to the growing eastern markets than hauling their products to the river warehouses or to Rochester by ox teams. A letter written by Donald McKenzie of Caledonia to the "Genesee Farmer" in 1832, suggested a railroad from LeRoy, through Caledonia, Mumford, and Scottsville to Rochester.

"After a long and general acquaintance with the western part of this state, I am convinced that a railroad from LeRoy to Rochester, along the valley of Allen's Creek (Oatka) and the Genesee River, would be a public benefit, were it to serve no other purpose than to facilitate the forwarding of materials for the building of other railroads in the western district. The inexhaustible quarries of building stone of the first quality on the banks of Allen's Creek and adjacent region, the abundant supplies of gravel for horse paths, of water lime, of bog lime, plaster of paris, oak, pine, and cedar are found in various parts of Caledonia, LeRoy and Wheatland would then be easily conveyed to other sections of the State where other railroads were being built.

The consequences of which would be a great reduction in the price of these necessary materials for constructing railroads. It is worthy of remark that there are strong indications of coal and other minerals in this region, and that the oak timber is of superior quality. There are also an abundance of water privileges, where plaster, water, lime, etc., can be prepared.

D. McKENZIE."

This period in local history saw the Tonawanda Railroad built from Rochester to Batavia. Plans to route it through Scottsville, Caledonia, and Le Roy on its way to Batavia were not adopted when the decision fell in favour of a more direct route. This contributed to increased support for the Scottsville and LeRoy Railroad proposal.

On December 3, 1835, an agreement was signed in which a number of people agreed to pay Powell Carpenter, Philip Garbutt, John McNaughton, and E. H. S. Mumford for the purpose of getting surveys and estimates for the route of a railroad along Oatka Creek from Scottsville to Mumford. The next meeting by the people of Wheatland interested in such a railroad, was held in the home of Mr. Boughton December 24. Powell Carpenter was chairman and J. P. Sill was secretary of the meeting.

Mr. Alvin Savage, who made the survey of the contemplated route, reported that the building of the railroad was practicable. A new committee was elected, consisting of Powell Carpenter, Abraham Hanford, William Garbutt, E. H. S. Mumford, Philip Garbutt, and Clark Hall.

Shareholders of the Scottsville and LeRoy Railroad (click to enlarge)

Another meeting was held January 9, 1836, at the house of George Ensign in Scottsville. A motion was passed "that the memorial in circulation to be presented to our Legislature for an Act on Incorporation in behalf of the contemplated Scottsville and LeRoy Railroad Company be so altered that Caledonia village be inserted and mentioned as one of the places by which said railroad shall pass."

A contract was made with William Wallace on March 5, 1836, to act as engineer and to begin work as soon as the weather permitted. He was to receive $3.50 per day for his services.

=== Establishment of a corporation ===
A charter was obtained in May for the construction of a railroad from Scottsville to LeRoy. According to some sources (e.g., Early American Railroads, Franz Anton Ritter von Gerstner's "Die innern Communicationen," 1842–1843), the original intention had been to go as far as Batavia, a distance of twenty-six miles. Powell Carpenter, Abraham Hanford, Philip Garbutt, E. H. S. Mumford, Clark Hall, Ira Carpenter, Thomas Halsted, Nathaniel Clark, Donald McDonald and Thomas Brown were named as incorporators. The capital stock of the corporation was $200,000.00 which was divided into shares of fifty dollars each.

In April 1836, by Legislative enactment, a group of Wheatland men were authorized to form a company to construct a railroad from Scottsville to Canandaigua. It was proposed to connect this railroad at that point with the road, then in process of construction, from Auburn to Canandaigua. The section of the railroad from Canandaigua to Rochester had been completed as far as the Pittsford hills, and according to an old letter, "Rochester folks had partly given up the Geneva and Canandaigua Railroad because they could not get over the Pittsford hills. They dreaded the consequence of exploring the route by Mendon and the Honeoye valley for fear of its branching across the Genesee River to intersect the Caledonia and LeRoy Railroad to Batavia." Another letter written by Eliphalet Murdock dated January 29, 1837, said in part: "The ground for a railroad from Buffalo to Batavia is all bought in and building will commence next summer, and I learn that the road from Auburn to Geneva and Canandaigua and Rochester is to come down the valley of the Honeoye outlet and if so we shall only have to cross the Genesee River to open the communication from Buffalo to Albany if these improvements go into effect of which I think we have a fair prospect. The great thoroughfare of the state by railroad will pass through this place and if so here will be a chance for speculation."

A preliminary survey of the route was made by Wallace, but no further action toward any construction was even taken.

=== Completion ===
Financial difficulties intervened, delaying completion of the Scottsville to Caledonia link until September 1838. The Scottsville and LeRoy Railroad was, most likely, completed as far as Mumford in 1837 and extended as far as Caledonia late in 1838. Steven's survey of the village of Scottsville indicates that the railroad started in front of E. T. Miller's warehouse and continued across the "millyard," in front of the mills, about one hundred and fifty feet south of Main Street. It then gently curved and ran southwest through Scott Crescent; crossed Caledonia Avenue and followed the embankment near the south line of the Catholic cemetery. It continued through farms and fields until it reached the highway just east of the McVean house. The railroad continued on the highway to the store of Philip Garbutt, where it passed in a depression under the platform in front of the store. The railroad tracks were on about the level of the basement floor, thus permitting the loading and unloading directly into the basement store room. The railroad curved southward across the fields, on an embankment, and rounded a hill almost parallel with the tracks of the Baltimore and Ohio Railroad. At Wheatland Center it met the highway and then ran on the south side and parallel to the highway to Mumford. At a point about due north of Smith Street it turned sharply south, crossed the creek on a bridge, and continued south in a straight line through Smith Street. It then followed the east bank of Spring Creek, passed Donald McKenzie's saw mill, to the grounds of the old Caledonia school.

== Construction ==
Ties were laid with grooves cut into the top surfaces, to hold the oak timbers or stringers to keep them from spreading. On the stringers were spiked the narrow strips of oak, about one inch by three inches, which served for the tracks. No iron was used except at the highway crossings. It was the rails that eventually caused the most trouble and many accidents. The rails were never completely covered with iron and wore out rapidly, causing many derailments. Since the wood rails could not be securely spiked down, heavy loads forced the ends to spring up with such force as to penetrate the floors of the cars.

Agreements were made with George Sheffer, Clark Hall, and William McKenzie, son of Donald McKenzie, to furnish the four by six green white oak timbers. (For estimate of the building of the railroad see Appendix No. 15.)

Ebenezer Beck was one of the principal contractors on the road. William Cook was one of the grading contractors, and Jefferson Edmunds was the contractor for building the bridge over Oatka Creek at Mumford.

The rail line from Scottsville to Caledonia ran approximately eight miles, with the tightest curve having a radius of 1,200 feet. Grades were mild, with the severest between Caledonia and Mumford at 36 feet per mile, or 1 in 147 (0.68%).

The roadbed for the line was fairly easy to build and had neither high embankments nor deep cuts through rock, which helped builders given the lack of available blasting materials. The bed averaged twelve feet in width, with cross-ties set an interval of four feet. The bridge across Oatka Creek was one hundred feet long and rested atop two masonry abutments and three piers.

By one accounting, the total cost, including land, labour, and rolling stock (eight freight cars), was around $4,000 a mile, for a total of eight miles and $32,000.

Horse cars were used on this railroad. The cars had no brakes and the wheels were made of pieces of planks bolted together. The axles were of iron similar to the axles used on wagons. Thomas Kane of Scottsville is said to have run the Scottsville and LeRoy Railroad, and he was the engineer, conductor, train-starter and brakeman.

The railroad had two passenger coaches, nearly square in shape, and painted a lead color. The passenger coaches were seldom used except by Clark Hall, of Halls Comers (now Wheatland Center) on Sundays, when he, his family, and friends would ride to Scottsville to attend church.

The people of LeRoy had several meetings to consider building the railroad from the town line to their village. A survey was made, but the people refused to act. Mr. Tomlinson tried to interest the people in extending the railroad from Caledonia to Tomlinson's Mills, south of LeRoy and thence to Batavia, but that also failed to materialize.

== Operation ==
The railroad was a success for several years. It carried flour from the mills at Caledonia, Mumford, Wheatland Center, and Garbutt to Scottsville. Here the cargo was transferred to the boats in Oatka Creek, behind the mills. The boats then passed through the creek to the Scottsville-Genesee River Canal and then into the river.

James R. Clark of Caledonia was an enthusiastic supporter of the railroad. With confidence that it would be continued to LeRoy that he named his tavern (now the home of Mrs. F. F. Keith) the Railroad House. A year after the railroad's completion, Clark approached William Garbutt, who was president at the time, with a proposition to take over the railroad. Garbutt laid the petition before the board at its next meeting in Mumford, and Clark was given a lease of the road and rolling stock for a term of years.

The building of the railroad, from Scottsville to Caledonia, would not alone have solved their transportation problem. The other half of the problem was to be able to load the boats at Scottsville and to navigate them to the river, and thence to Rochester and the Erie Canal.

The success of the Scottsville-LeRoy Railroad was of short duration. As long as it operated in conjunction with the Scottsville-Genesee River Canal it was a success; the railroad cars could then be unloaded in the "millyard," and the products transferred to the canal boats in the creek back of the mills. But with the completion of the Genesee Valley Canal in 1840, that section of Oatka Creek between the feeder gates and the flour mills, which was a part of the old Scottsville-Genesee River Canal, became obsolete and could no longer be used by canal boats. It became necessary to build new warehouses along the bank of the Genesee Valley Canal and on "the island." The island was that triangular shaped piece of land enclosed by the Genesee Valley Canal, the feeder, and Oatka Creek. The Scottsville-LeRoy Railroad could not be extended to the new warehouses on "the island" because the grade from Rochester Street down to the warehouses was too steep. The cost of trucking the goods from the end of the railroad line in the "millyard" to the boats or warehouses on the canal was too costly.

A letter written by James R. Clark states that it was expensive to purchase horses, equipment, and harness. After loading eighty barrels of flour on four freight cars, the load caused the sharp flanges on the wheels to cut the wooden rails and the cars would be derailed. It would then require half a day to get the cars back on the tracks. The various difficulties forced the Scottsville-LeRoy Railroad to cease operation soon after 1840.

== Charter ==
Charter of Scottsville and LeRoy Railroad

CHAPTER 420

AN ACT to provide for the construction of 3 railroad from Scottsville to LeRoy.

Passed May 21, 1836

Sec. 1. All persons who shall become stockholders pursuant to this act, shall be and they are hereby constituted a body politic and corporate for the term of fifty years by the name of "The Scottsville & LeRoy Rail-Road Company." for the purpose of constructing and maintaining a rail-road between the village of Scottsville in the County of Monroe and the town of LeRoy in the county of Genesee, commencing in or near the village of Scottsville, and running thence through Mumford and Caledonia to such point in the town of LeRoy, and on such roads as a majority of the directors of said company shall determine to be best adapted to the public accommodations, and may take, transport, carry and convey property and persons upon the same, by the power and force of steam, or animals, or any mechanical power, or of any combination of them.

Sec. 2. If the said corporation shall not, within two years from the passage of this act, commence the construction of the said road, and expend at least the sum of five thousand dollars thereon, and shall not, within four year from the passage of this act, finish the said road, and put the same in operation, then the said corporation shall henceforth forever cease, and this act shall be null and void.

Sec. 3. The capital stock of said corporation shall be two hundred thousand dollars, which shall be divided into shares of fifty dollars each, which shares shall be deemed personal property, and be transferred in such manner as the said corporation shall in its by-laws direct; and Powell Carpenter, Abraham Hanford, Philip Garbutt, Elihu H. S. Mumford, Clark Hall, Ira Carpenter, Thomas Halsted, Nathaniel Clark, Donald McDonald, and Thomas Brown, shall be commissioners or receive subscriptions and distribute the stock.

Sec. 4. The corporation hereby created, shall possess and enjoy all the privileges and provisions which are granted to, and made in favor of, the corporation created by the act "AN ACT to provide for the construction of a railroad from Attica to Buffalo." passed May 3, 1836, and shall be subject to all the conditions and restrictions which by the act aforesaid, are imposed upon the corporation therein referred to, except as herein provided.

Sec. 5. Any application to be made to a vice-chancellor under this act, shall be made to the vice-chancellor of the circuit in which the land proposed to be taken, shall be situated: All notices and meetings required in the act above referred to, shall be published and held in one of the counties through which the said rail-road hereby authorized, is to be made.

Sec. 6. The said corporation may receive a sum not exceeding five cents per mile for the transportation of any passenger and his ordinary baggage.

== Estimated construction cost ==
ESTIMATE FOR THE BUILDING OF THE RAILROAD

The commissioners to make estimates were Powell Carpenter, Philip Garbutt, William Garbutt, John McNaughion, and E. H. S. Mumford.

task/materials	cost
ties - 8,366 pieces	$1,300.00
rails - 133,848 ft (40,797 m)	1,400.00
laying timber - 6.34 mi (10.20 km)	1,300.00
bridge at Mumford	850.00
grading from Hanford's to Scottsville	1,044.00
two bridges across canal	100.00
grading from Hanford's to H. C. McVean's	200.00
grading and passways	200.00
grading Reed's ridge	240.00
timber and planking bridge at P. Garbutt's store	40.00
McKenzie and Laidlaw's job at grading	1,600.00
grading at McNaughton's	800.00
grading at McArthur's	400.00
grading at Blakeslee & Wells	1,450.00
grading John A. McVean's hill	654.00
grading from sawmill to plaster mill in Mumford	500.00
mason work and culverts west of Reed's	300.00
balance of engineering	500.00
amount paid by Philip Garbutt	4,132.00
subtotal	$19,870.00
monies advanced on contracts included in this estimate	1,363.00
one and one-quarter timber laid	453.00
digging plaster	230.00
subtotal	2,046.00
net total	$17,814.00
making 6.3 miles of road at $2,815.00 per mile	$17,818.33
