= Isaac Scott =

Isaac Scott may refer to:

- Isaac Scott (pioneer) (c. 1745–1818), pioneer and founder of Scottsville, New York
- Isaac Scott (musician) (1945–2001), American blues guitarist and singer
- SS Isaac M. Scott (1909), an American Great Lakes freighter
