= Tonawanda Railroad =

Railroad company in New York

Overview
- Dates of operation: 1832–1850
- Successor: Buffalo and Rochester Railroad

Technical
- Track gauge: 1,435 mm (4 ft 8 1/2 in)
- Length: 43 miles (69 km)

The Tonawanda Railroad was a railroad company established in Rochester, New York in 1832. Its line ran 43 miles (69 km) from Rochester to Attica, New York. It was consolidated with the Attica and Buffalo Railroad in 1850 to form the Buffalo and Rochester Railroad, a predecessor of the first New York Central Railroad.

== Background ==
Like other growing towns and cities, Batavia needed access to affordable and reliable commercial transportation services. The Erie Canal provided a solution for most of upstate New York, but it did not reach Batavia. Instead, canal designers selected Eighteen Mile Creek as the area to scale the formidable Niagara Escarpment. The Tonawanda's two wood-burning locomotives were delivered to the area by canal boat, five years after the company was chartered.

== Origin ==
The Tonawanda Railroad was chartered on 24 April 1832 for the purpose of building a rail line from Rochester to Attica and eventually Buffalo. Initially, the route was to have included Scottsville, Mumford, Caledonia, and Le Roy before a more direct route to Batavia was adopted. These areas were later served by construction of the Scottsville & LeRoy Railroad.

This was the second railroad to be built in New York State, following the Mohawk and Hudson, the Albany-to-Schenectady road, which began 17 April 1827. This railroad was named after Tonawanda Creek, which flows through Batavia. Historian Edward Dunn questions the derivation of the naming, as the eleven miles (17.7 km) of line constructed up the valley of the Tonawanda Creek to Attica was an afterthought. This part was constructed in 1841, well after the company was founded and named.

Dunn noted that developers intended simply to build a connection with the Attica and Buffalo Railroad. With the completion in 1853 of the shorter and more direct Buffalo and Rochester Railroad, the Attica and Buffalo was sold to the Erie Railroad.

== Construction ==
The line reached South Byron by 1836, and service with horse cars began. The first primary section, 31 1/2 miles (50.7 km) from Rochester southwest to Batavia, opened 5 May 1837; the rest of the line followed the valley of the Tonawanda Creek to Attica by 1842, opening on 8 January 1843. The chief engineer for the project was Elisha Johnson.

== Operation ==
In 1888, the Batavia newspaper wrote:

"The Tonawanda railroad was intended to run from Rochester to Buffalo, via of Batavia. In 1836 the road was completed to South Byron, about eight miles Northeast of Batavia, and cars were run as far as that point, horses furnishing the motive power. A year later the road reached Batavia which was then the terminus. The Company then purchased of James BRISBANE, a wealthy merchant and extensive land owner in the village, six acres of land on which to locate their depot. The road as originally mapped out was to run North of Main street in Batavia and the depot was to be located near the present site of Mr. George BRISBANE's residence. It was then the intention to cross the Tonawanda Creek where the Alleghany road bridge now is, and taking the line now followed by the new Buffalo road go direct to Buffalo, but through the influence of men owning the property on the South side of the street, the engineer was induced to change the route and locate it where their property would be more likely to appreciate in value. The Company built their first depot at the corner of Big Tree street (now Ellicott street) and South street, (now Jackson street) in the village of Batavia.

The first ticket agent of the Central road at Batavia was Erastus SEYMOUR, who kept a book and registered the name of every passenger who purchased a ticket. This book came into the possession of Mr. MIX several years ago and was later given to Ellis N. OSBORNE, then the Central's station agent at Batavia. After Mr. OSBORNE's death his son presented the book to the Buffalo Historical Society, which now has it among many interesting and valuable relics of the pioneer days of Western New York.

The first depot was built with the track running through the same and having large doors at each end in which the cars were locked up every night. A track was laid from the depot along Ellicott street to a point near the present site of the Court House, at which point was located the turn-table and water tank. The opening of the road from Rochester to Batavia was celebrated May 8th, 1837, with a grand demonstration, great crowds coming from the surrounding country to see the first locomotive. April 13th, 1840, the Legislature granted an extension of three years time for the completion of the road from Batavia to Attica, and May 1st of that year the State of New York loaned the Tonawanda railroad $100,000 with which to go on with the construction. At Attica the road connected with the Attica & Buffalo Railroad, which had been chartered by the Legislature May 13th, 1836. These roads were completed, and opening of a through line from Rochester to Buffalo via Batavia and Attica was celebrated January 5th, 1843. April 9th, 1850, the Tonawanda Railroad and the Attica and Buffalo Railroad were authorized to consolidate and change the name of the corporations to the Rochester and Buffalo Railroad, and also to shorten the distance between Rochester and Buffalo by the construction of a branch or second line running direct to Buffalo from Batavia. This is the line now occupied by the four tracks of the New York Central."

== Terminal ==
Railroads went through frequent changes as more were brought into operation. On 7 December 1850, the Tonawanda Railroad and the Attica and Buffalo Railroad merged to form the Buffalo and Rochester Railroad. That railroad was one of ten that merged on 17 May 1853 to form the New York Central Railroad.

This Tonawanda was not related to the similarly named Tonawanda Valley Railroad, the Tonawanda Valley Extension Railroad, or the Tonawanda Valley and Cuba Railroad, all three of which were merged into the new Tonawanda Valley and Cuba Railroad in 1881. It went bankrupt three years later, after having built sections of its route over unstable quicksand.
