= Garbuttsville Cemetery =

Historic cemetery in New York, United States

- U.S. National Register of Historic Places
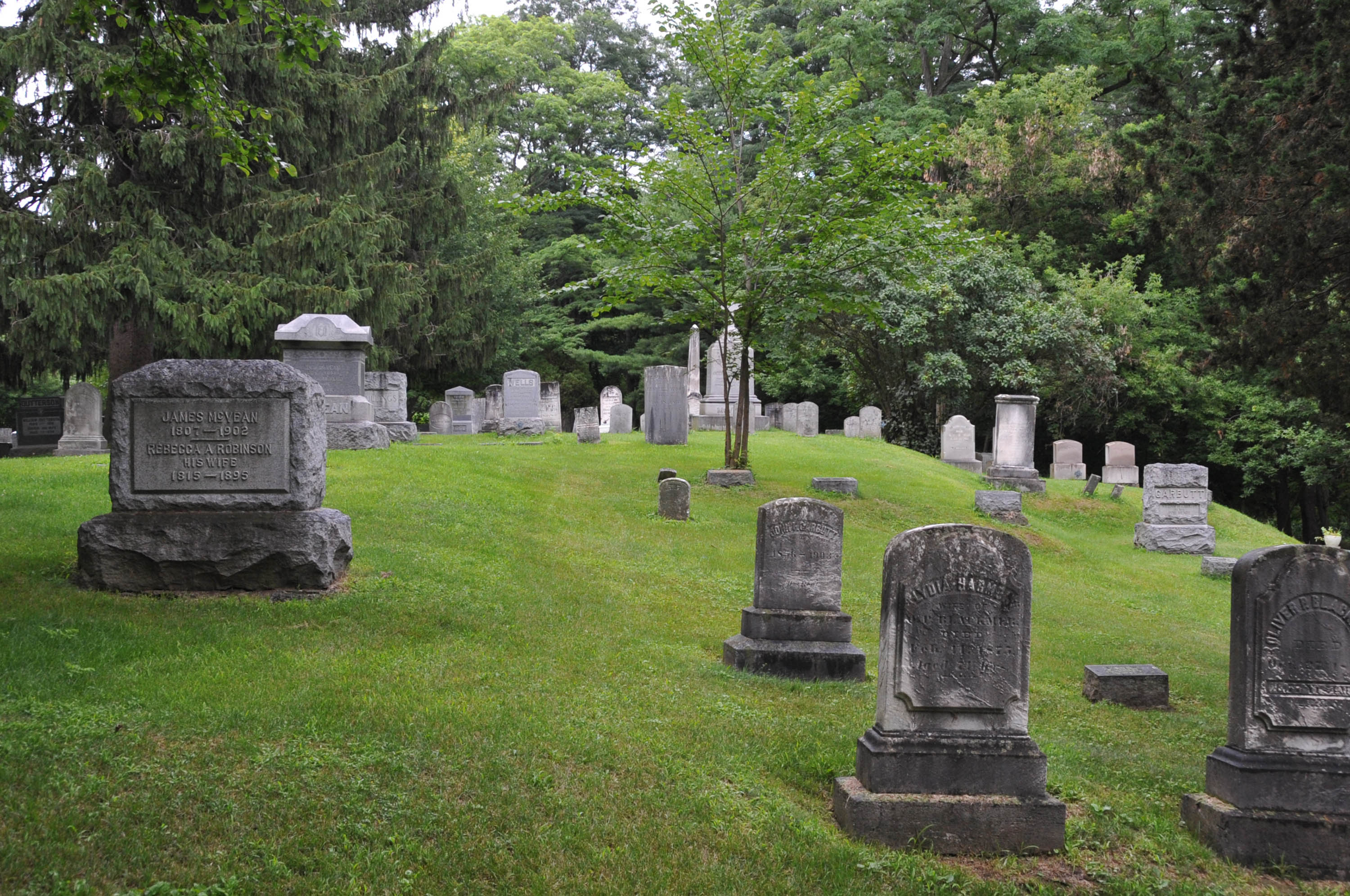

- Location within New York Location within the United States
- Location: Union St., Garbutt, New York
- Coordinates: 43°0′54″N 77°47′29″W
- Area: 1.2 acres (0.49 ha)
- NRHP reference No.: 06001077
- Added to NRHP: November 29, 2006

Garbuttsville Cemetery is a historic cemetery located at the hamlet of Garbutt in the town of Wheatland in Monroe County, New York. It is one of the earliest surviving cemeteries in Monroe County and is an intact country cemetery that reflects the history of the once thriving industrial hamlet of Garbuttsville (now Garbutt). It also illustrates the development patterns of small vernacular cemeteries through the 19th century and prevalent styles of modest and middle class grave monuments from that period. There are approximately 570 graves with most graves dating prior to 1920.

John Garbutt (ca. 1779–1855) is buried in the cemetery.

It was listed on the National Register of Historic Places in 2006.
