= McVean =

McVean is a surname. Notable people with the surname include:

- Charles McVean (1802–1848), American judge
- Gilean McVean (born 1973), British statistician
- Katie McVean (born 1986), New Zealand equestrian
- Malcolm McVean (1871–1907), Scottish footballer

== See also ==
- David McVean House, a historic house in Monroe County, New York
