= Oatka Creek Park =

Park in Monroe County, New York, United States

- Location within New York
- Location: Wheatland, Monroe, New York, United States
- Coordinates: 43°01′29″N 77°50′49″W
- Elevation: 648 ft (198 m)
- Governing body: Monroe County Parks Department
- Website: http://www2.monroecounty.gov/parks-oatka.php

Oatka Creek Park, part of the Monroe County park system, lies near the center of the Town of Wheatland in New York. The park is bounded on the east by Union Street (County Road 170), the north by the tracks of the Rochester & Southern Railroad, and the west and south by Stewart Road. Immediately northeast of the park is the hamlet of Garbutt.

The principal entrance at 9797 Union Street is an extension of Quaker Road and leads to the Oatka Lodge, the one significant man-made feature of the park. The remainder of the park is undeveloped, with former farm fields reverting to their natural state.

Oatka Creek Park covers 461 acres (1.87 km^{2}) along both banks of approximately one mile (1.6 km) of Oatka Creek. It is open to the public between 7 a.m. and 11 p.m. daily in summer (reduced hours in winter), with a strict carry-in/carry-out rule to prevent the accumulation of garbage.

It is home to the Caledonia-Mumford Red Raiders and the Wheatland-Chili Wildcats Cross Country teams.
