= Cox–Budlong House =

Historic house in New York, United States

- U.S. National Register of Historic Places
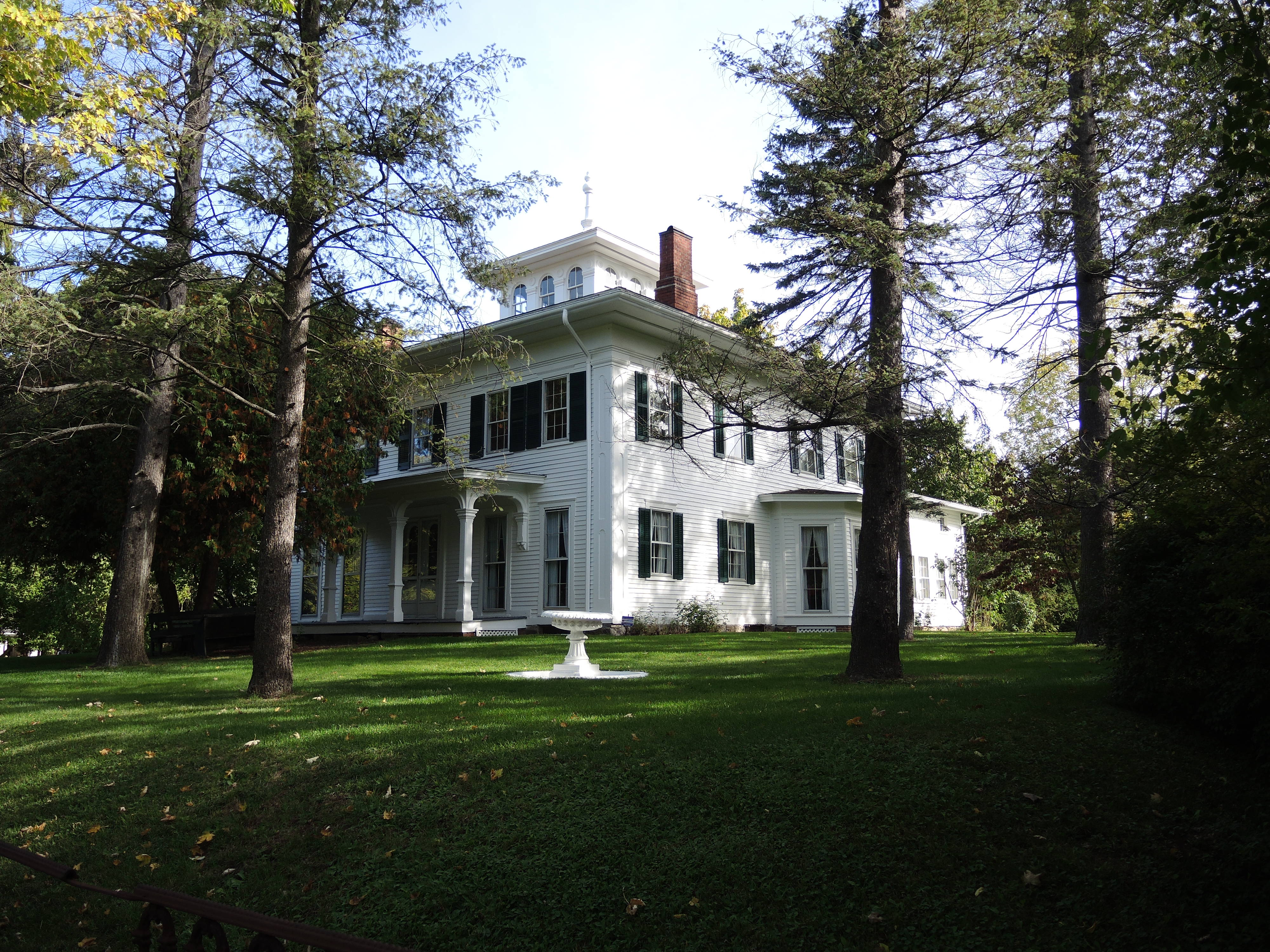

- Location within New York Location within the United States
- Location: 4396 River Rd., Scottsville, New York
- Coordinates: 43.01383°N 77.74671°W
- Area: 1.7 acres (0.69 ha)
- Built: c. 1820, c. 1869
- Architectural style: Federal, Greek Revival, Italianate
- NRHP reference No.: 15000007
- Added to NRHP: February 12, 2015

The Cox–Budlong House is a historic house at 4396 River Road near Scottsville, Monroe County, New York.

== Description and history ==
The house was built in about 1820 by an early settler of Wheatland in the Federal style. It was renovated about 1869 with Greek Revival and Italianate styles. It consists of a two-story Italianate-style main house with a 1 1/2-story east-end addition. The frame dwelling has an overhanging hipped roof topped by a cupola and finial. Also on the property are the contributing Victorian-era iron fence and the remnants of a late-19th-century cast-iron fountain.

It was listed on the National Register of Historic Places on February 12, 2015.
