= Simeon Sage House =

Historic house in New York, United States

- U.S. National Register of Historic Places
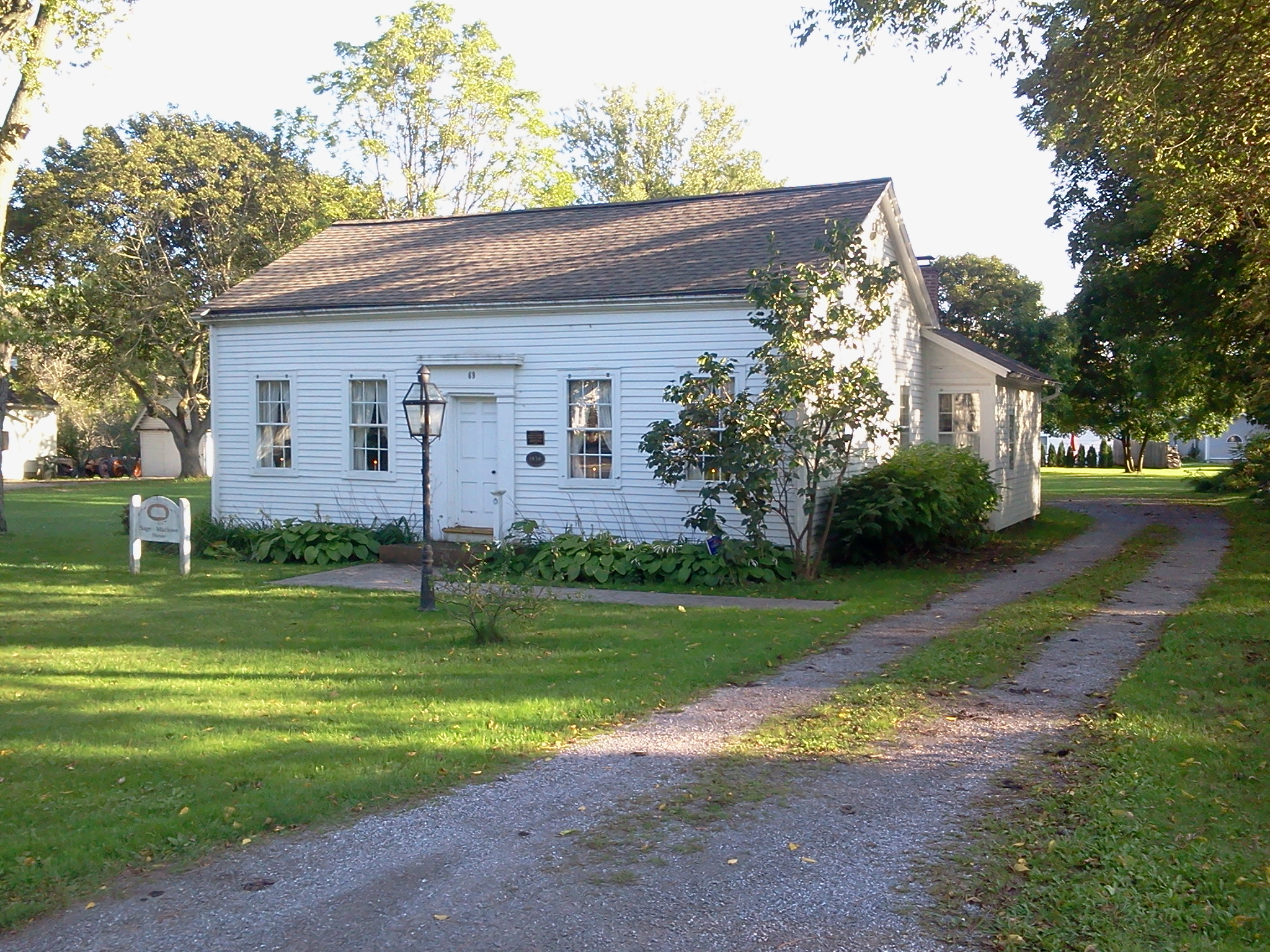

- Location within New York Location within the United States
- Location: 69 Main St., Scottsville, New York
- Coordinates: 43°1′9.37″N 77°45′23.69″W
- Area: .22 acres (0.089 ha)
- Built: 1830
- Architectural style: Federal, Greek Revival
- NRHP reference No.: 09001285
- Added to NRHP: January 29, 2010

Simeon Sage House is a historic home located at Scottsville in Monroe County, New York. It was built about 1830 and consists of a 1-story, five-by-two-bay, rectangular main block with a smaller 1-story rectangular rear wing in a vernacular Federal style. There are later Greek Revival style modification. It is an example of a working man's cottage. It serves as home to the Wheatland Historical Association and a rectangular, frame educational facility and meeting room were added in 2000.

It was listed on the National Register of Historic Places in 2010.
