= First Presbyterian Church of Mumford =

Historic church in New York, United States

- U.S. National Register of Historic Places
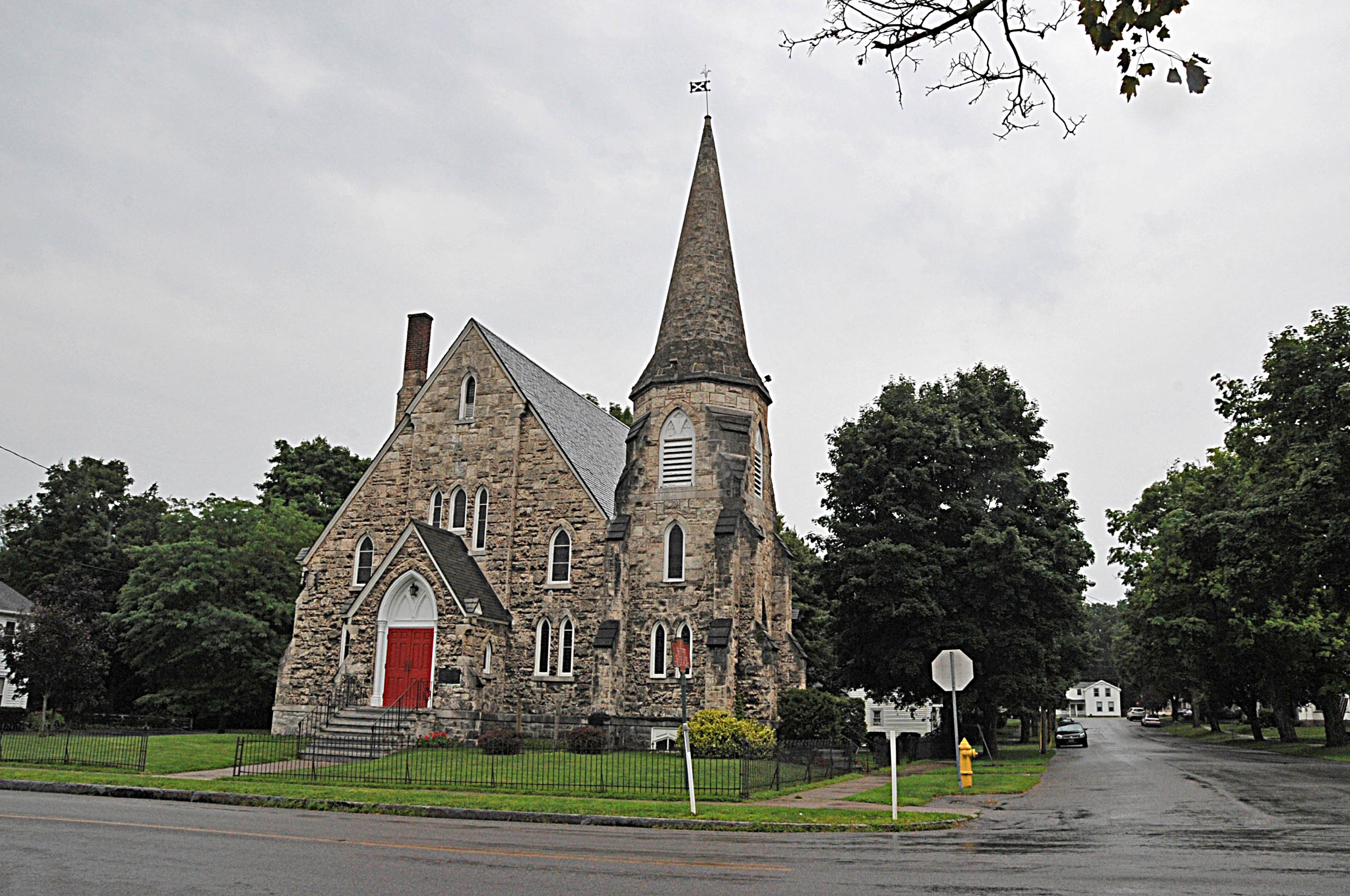

- Location within New York Location within the United States
- Location: George and William Sts., Mumford, New York
- Coordinates: 42°59′32″N 77°51′44″W
- Area: 0.4 acres (0.16 ha)
- Built: 1883
- Architect: Warner, Andrew Jackson
- Architectural style: Gothic
- NRHP reference No.: 02000299
- Added to NRHP: April 01, 2002

First Presbyterian Church of Mumford is a historic Presbyterian church located at Mumford in Monroe County, New York. It was designed by architect Andrew Jackson Warner and is a High Victorian Gothic–style edifice built in 1883 of rare bog limestone (tufa). The main block of the building is five bays long and three bays wide (approximately 50 feet by 60 feet), with a freestanding 70-foot tower with spire at the northwest corner.

It was listed on the National Register of Historic Places in 2002.
