= William Shirts House =

Historic house in New York, United States

- U.S. National Register of Historic Places
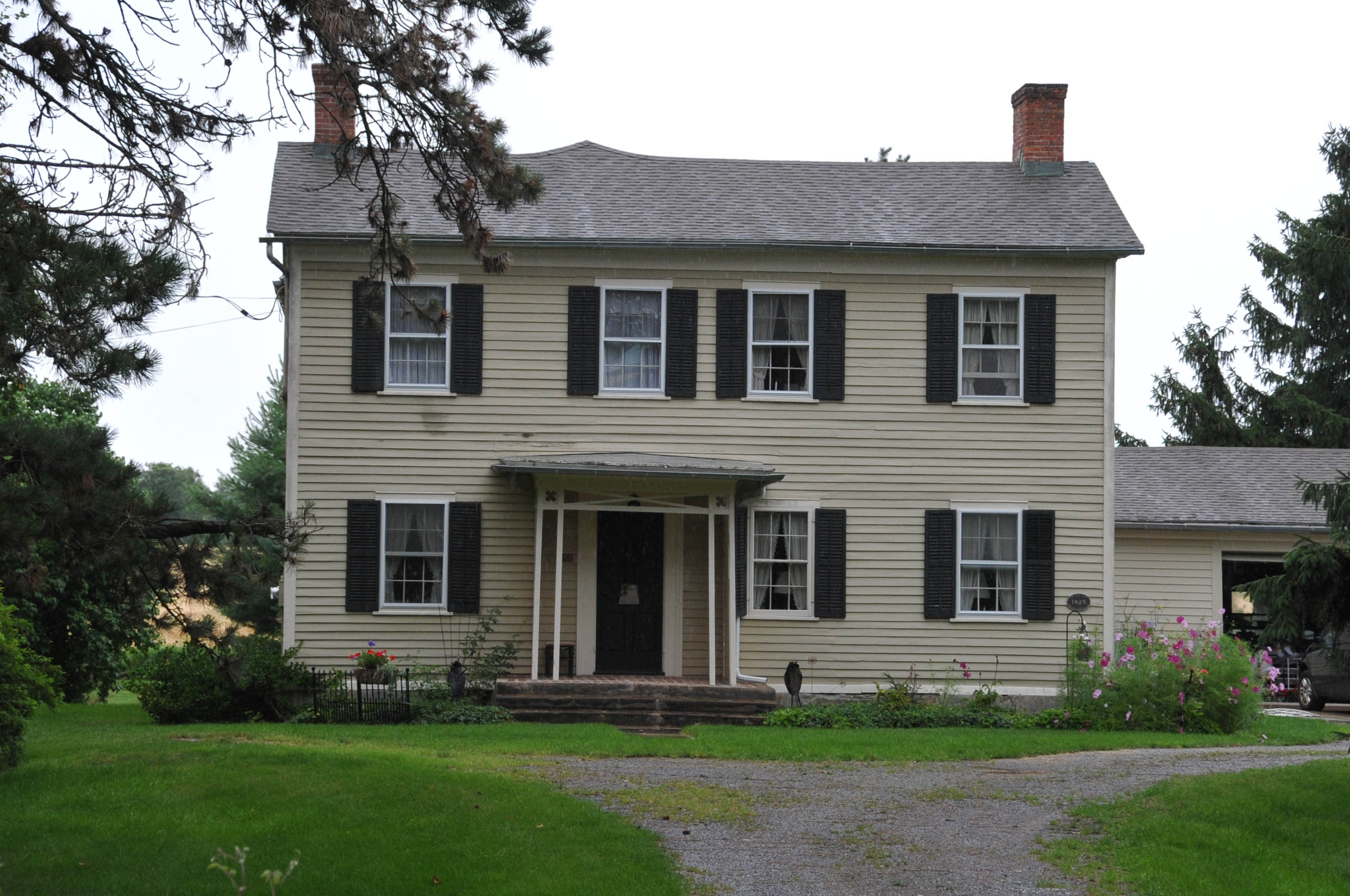

- Location within New York Location within the United States
- Nearest city: Scottsville, New York
- Coordinates: 43°1′30″N 77°51′16″W
- Area: 5 acres (2.0 ha)
- Built: 1825
- Architect: Shirts, William
- Architectural style: Federal
- NRHP reference No.: 04000286
- Added to NRHP: April 16, 2004

William Shirts House, also known as Camperdown Farm, is a historic home in Scottsville in Monroe County, New York. The vernacular Federal-style house was built about 1825. It is composed of a two-story, four-by-two-bay, main block with a two-story rear wing.

It was listed on the National Register of Historic Places in 2004.
