= First Baptist Church of Mumford =

Historic church in New York, United States

- U.S. National Register of Historic Places
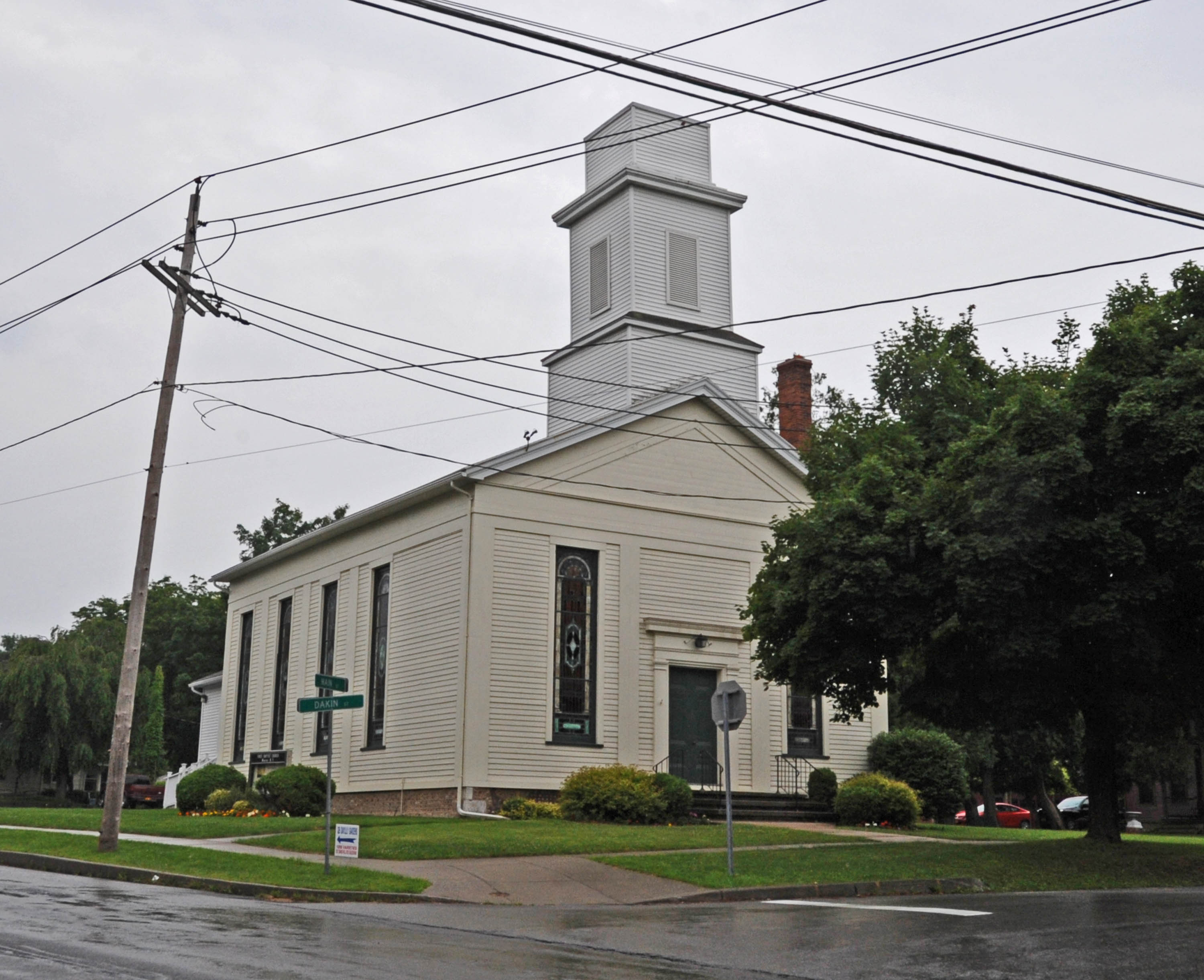

- Location within New York Location within the United States
- Location: 5 Dakin St., Mumford, New York
- Coordinates: 42°59′25.26″N 77°51′35.16″W
- Area: .15 acres (0.061 ha)
- Built: 1852
- Architect: Wilcox, Rensalaer W.
- Architectural style: Greek Revival
- NRHP reference No.: 10000100
- Added to NRHP: March 23, 2010

First Baptist Church of Mumford is a historic Baptist church located at Mumford in Monroe County, New York. It was built in 1852, and is a three-by-four-bay, vernacular Greek Revival–style frame church building on a cobblestone foundation. It features a square, three stage tower. Minor expansions and alterations were done to the building through 1917.

It was listed on the National Register of Historic Places in 2010.
