= Grace Church (Scottsville, New York) =

Historic church in New York, United States

- U.S. National Register of Historic Places
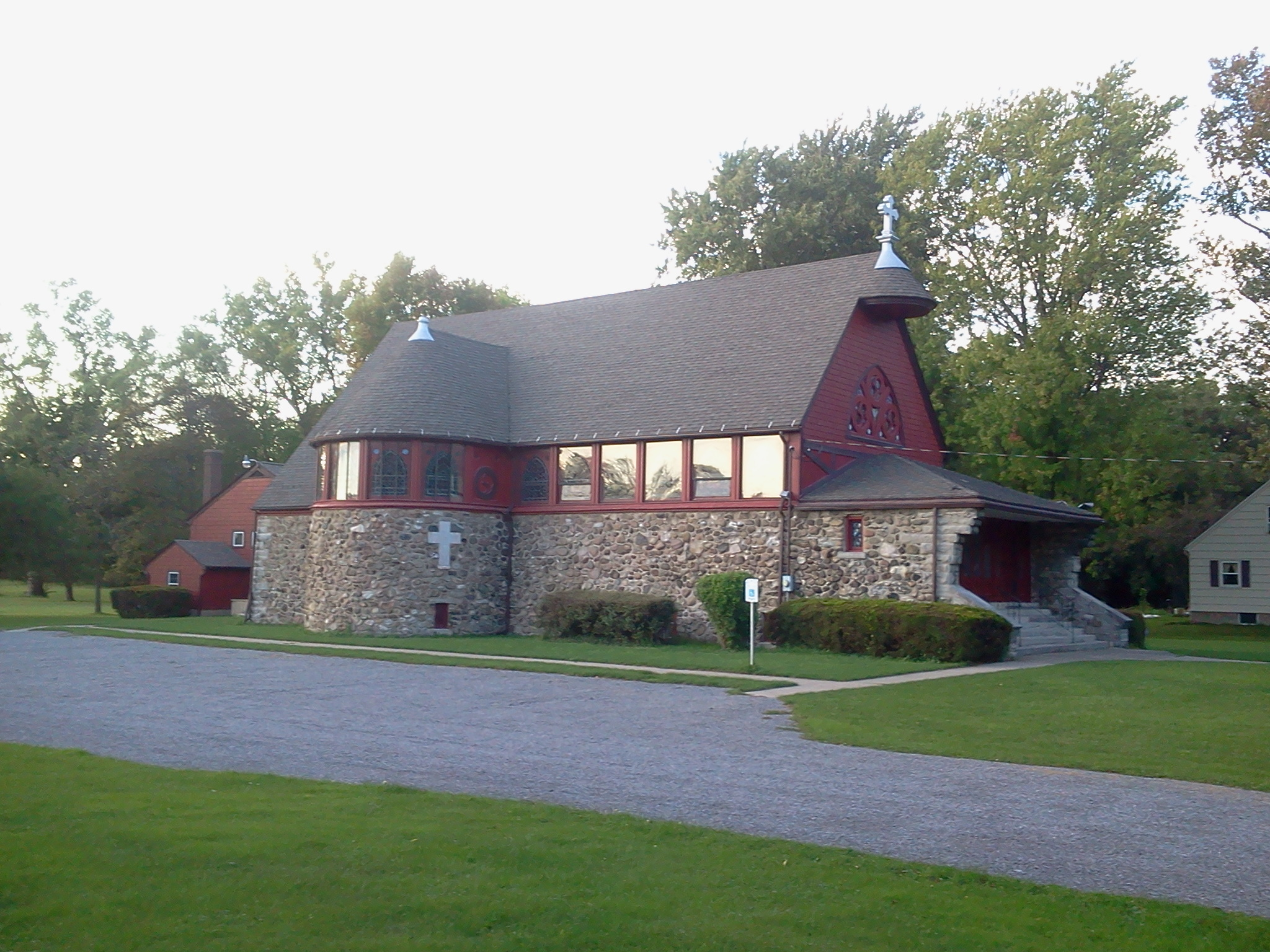

- Location within New York Location within the United States
- Location: 9 Browns Ave., Scottsville, New York
- Coordinates: 43°1′22″N 77°45′5″W
- Area: .88 acres (0.36 ha)
- Built: 1852
- Architect: Ellis, Harvey; Arthur Rotch and George T. Tilden
- Architectural style: Richardsonian Romanesque
- NRHP reference No.: 10000514
- Added to NRHP: July 30, 2010

Grace Church is a historic Episcopal church located at Scottsville in Monroe County, New York. The church was designed by noted Rochester architect Harvey Ellis (1852-1904) and built in 1885. It is in the Latin cross form in the Richardsonian Romanesque style. It has a native fieldstone lower level with an upper section of frame construction with a non-structural wall of stained glass. It features rounded apsidal and transept ends topped by conical roofs. Attached is a Sunday school wing constructed in 1956 and a square, shingled bell tower added in 1976. It is a congregation in the Episcopal Diocese of Rochester.

It was listed on the National Register of Historic Places in 2010.
