= Rochester Street Historic District =

Historic district in New York, United States

- U.S. National Register of Historic Places
- U.S. Historic district
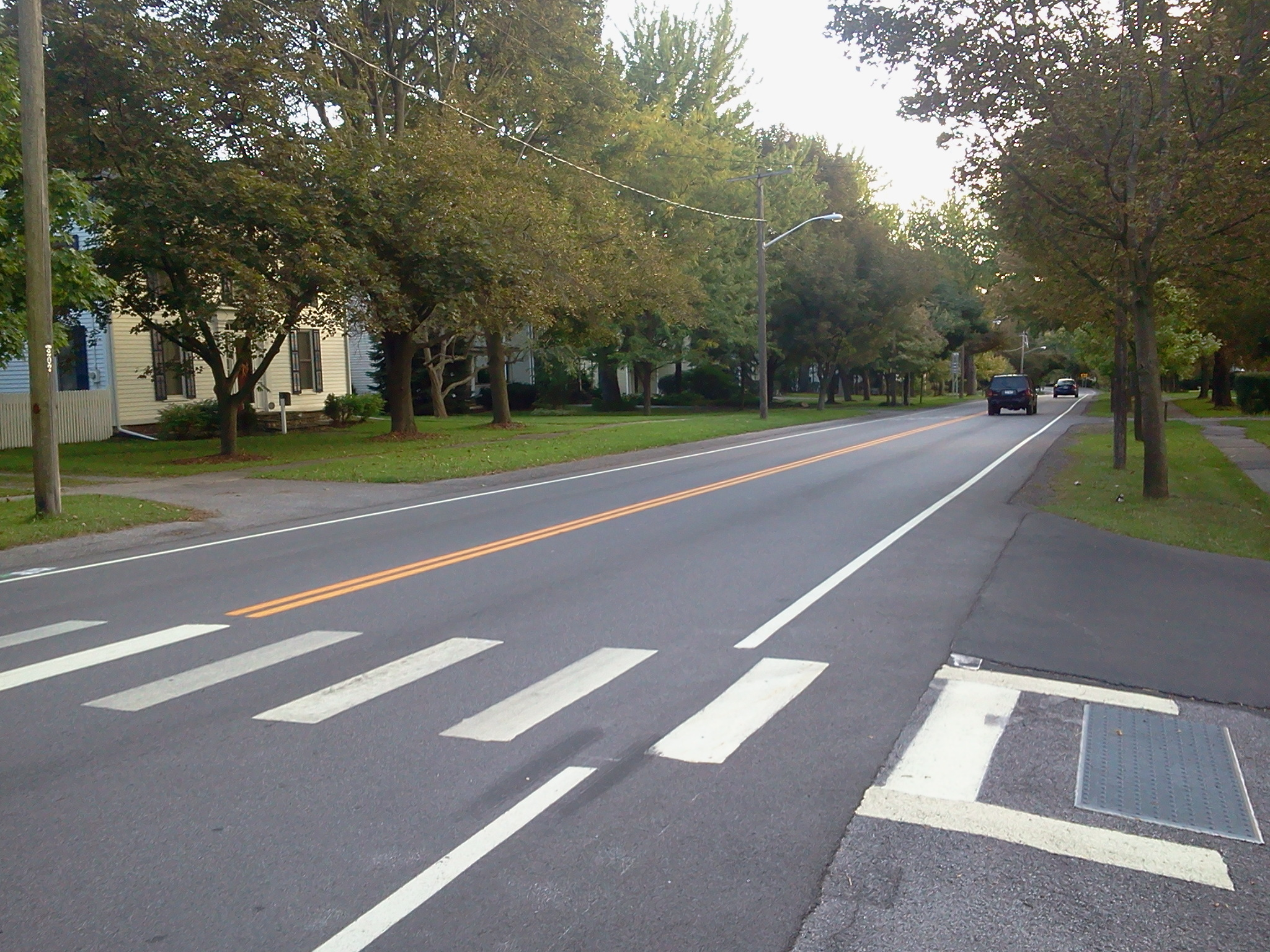

- Location within New York Location within the United States
- Location: Both sides of Rochester St., Scottsville, New York
- Coordinates: 43°1′25″N 77°44′49″W
- Area: 20 acres (8.1 ha)
- Architectural style: Greek Revival
- NRHP reference No.: 73001205
- Added to NRHP: October 25, 1973

Rochester Street Historic District is a national historic district located at Scottsville in Monroe County, New York. The district encompasses 41 residential structures, over half of which date from the 1830s through 1850s and are distinct examples of Greek Revival architecture.

It was listed on the National Register of Historic Places in 1973.
