= Union Presbyterian Church (Scottsville, New York) =

Historic church in New York, United States

- U.S. National Register of Historic Places
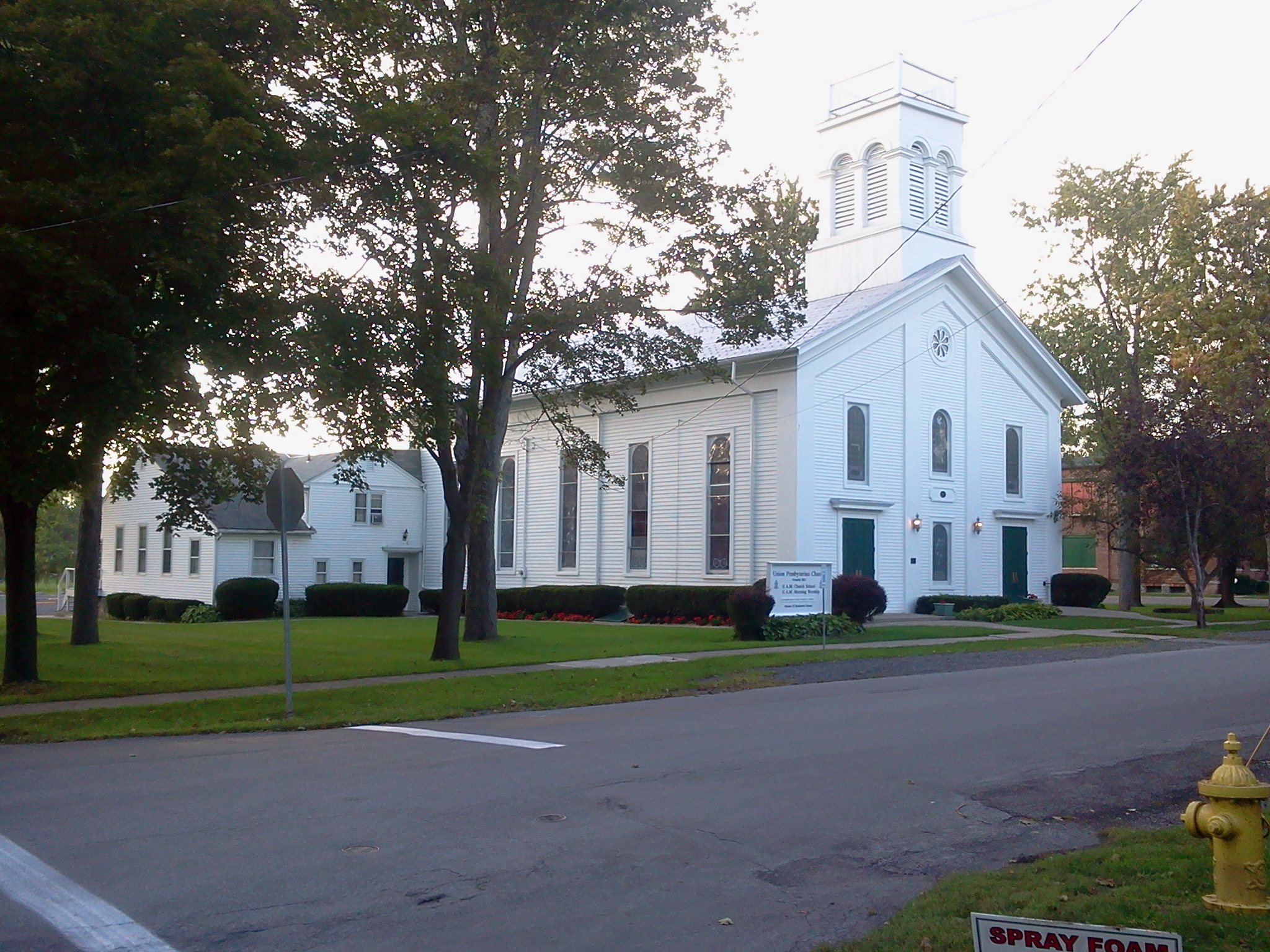

- Location within New York Location within the United States
- Location: Church St., Scottsville, New York
- Coordinates: 43°1′18″N 77°45′7″W
- Area: less than one acre
- Architect: Marvin, Luke
- Architectural style: Exotic Revival
- NRHP reference No.: 04001439
- Added to NRHP: December 13, 2004

Union Presbyterian Church, also known as First Presbyterian Church of Wheatland, is a historic Presbyterian church located at Scottsville in Monroe County, New York. It is a mid-19th-century vernacular Romanesque Revival–style building. It is composed of a three- by five-bay frame church with a 1 1/2-story rear wing that houses classrooms, offices, and kitchen facilities.

It was listed on the National Register of Historic Places in 2004.
