= Buffalo and Rochester Railroad =

Railroad company in New York

Overview
- Dates of operation: 1850–1853
- Predecessors: Attica and Buffalo Railroad; Tonawanda Railroad
- Successor: New York Central Railroad

Technical
- Track gauge: 1,435 mm (4 ft 8 1/2 in)
- Length: 76 miles (122 km)

The Buffalo and Rochester Railroad was a railroad company formed on December 7, 1850 by the merger of the Tonawanda Railroad and the Attica and Buffalo Railroad. The company remained in business for three years before it was merged with other companies into the New York Central Railroad.

== History ==
Initially, the idea for this line came from the perceived need for a rail line to serve Steuben and Livingston Counties in New York. Farmers and merchants in the area proposed a route along the Cohocton and Genesee river valleys up to Avon. The route would thence go west to the Tonawanda Railroad at Batavia. This would have been an alternative to the Erie Railroad's plan to end its line at Dunkirk. The Erie declined, and the projected line became the Buffalo and Cohocton Valley Railroad. The side line from Avon to Batavia, however, became part of the Buffalo and Rochester Railroad.

The primary accomplishment of the railroad was the construction of a new route between Buffalo and Batavia. The original route went from Rochester to Batavia to Attica and then to Buffalo. In April 1852, the railroad opened a new line from Buffalo to Batavia. This shortened the distance between the two cities and became part of the New York Central Railroad's famed "Water Level Route". The Buffalo and Rochester sold its line between Attica and Depew (east of Buffalo) to the Buffalo and New York City Railroad, part of the New York and Erie Railroad system. The new owners converted the line to their six-foot gauge.

The railroad was one of ten that merged on May 17, 1853 to form the New York Central Railroad.
