= Attica and Buffalo Railroad =

Overview
- Dates of operation: 1836–1850
- Successor: Buffalo and Rochester Railroad

Technical
- Track gauge: 1,435 mm (4 ft 8 1/2 in)
- Length: 31 miles (50 km)

The Attica and Buffalo Railroad was a railway company in the United States. It was incorporated in 1836 and completed a line between Attica and Buffalo, New York, in 1842. The company was consolidated with the Tonawanda Railroad in 1850 to form the Buffalo and Rochester Railroad, a predecessor of the first New York Central Railroad. Much of the company's line was sold to the Buffalo and New York City Railroad, an Erie Railroad affiliate, in 1852.

== History ==
The Attica and Buffalo Railroad was incorporated on May 3, 1836. Construction began in 1841, and the railroad opened between Buffalo and Darien in September 1842. It was extended east to Attica and a junction with the Tonawanda Railroad on November 24. Finally, the first of several Buffalo stations at Exchange Street opened in 1843.

The Attica and Buffalo Railroad and Tonawanda Railroad were consolidated on December 7, 1850, to form the Buffalo and Rochester Railroad. The new company promptly built a new direct route between Buffalo and Rochester via Batavia, bypassing Attica. The line between Attica and Depew was sold to the Buffalo and New York City Railroad, an Erie Railroad affiliate, on December 1, 1852.
