= Scottsville, New York =

- Village
- Location in Monroe County and the state of New York

- Location of New York in the United States
- Coordinates: 43°01′19″N 77°45′13″W
- Country: United States
- State: New York
- County: Monroe
- Town: Wheatland
- Settled: 1790; 236 years ago
- Incorporated: October 16, 1914; 111 years ago

Government
  - Mayor: Maggie Ridge

Area
  - Total: 1.09 sq mi (2.82 km^{2})
  - Land: 1.08 sq mi (2.80 km^{2})
  - Water: 0.0039 sq mi (0.01 km^{2})
- Elevation: 537 ft (164 m)

Population (2020)
  - Total: 2,009
  - Density: 1,855.4/sq mi (716.38/km^{2})
- Time zone: UTC-5 (EST)
  - Summer (DST): UTC-4 (EDT)
- ZIP Code: 14546
- Area codes: 585
- FIPS code: 36-65959
- Website: www.scottsvilleny.gov

Scottsville is a village within the town of Wheatland in Monroe County, New York, United States. The population was 2,009 at the 2020 census. The village is named after an early settler, Isaac Scott, and is within the Rochester metropolitan area.

== History ==
Before Euro-American settlement, the area that became Scottsville lay within the territory and hunting grounds of the Seneca people, one of the nations of the Haudenosaunee. This Indigenous presence shaped the region for centuries before permanent non-Indigenous settlement began in the late eighteenth century.

Scottsville developed in an area of very early non-Indigenous settlement in western New York. Local histories identify Ebenezer "Indian" Allan as settling near Oatka Creek in 1786, and Jacob Schoonover as another early settler who arrived in 1790. The village later took its name from Isaac Scott, who came to the area in 1790 and purchased about 150 acres (0.61 km2) from the Wadsworth family that became the nucleus of the settlement. Scott's log house was at the southwest corner of Main and Rochester streets in the village.

Scottsville’s growth in the nineteenth century was closely tied not only to agriculture but also to its role in regional transportation networks. Even before the full development of the Genesee Valley Canal, the village occupied an advantageous position in the Genesee Valley. When canal connections expanded through Scottsville in the 1830s, the village became an important shipping and commercial point for products from the surrounding countryside, especially wheat, flour, and gypsum. Its function as a canal port helped make it a local center of trade and exchange.

Later transportation links strengthened that role: the Scottsville and Le Roy Railroad, chartered in 1836, connected Scottsville with nearby communities in the Genesee Valley. Railroad development in and around Scottsville reflected the broader shift in western New York from water-based transport to a combined canal-and-rail economy. These links connected the village more directly with nearby markets and helped sustain its commercial importance during the nineteenth century.

Although the canal era eventually passed, it left a lasting mark on the village’s physical and historical landscape. The abandonment of the Genesee Valley Canal in the late nineteenth century did not erase Scottsville’s transportation history; instead, parts of the old canal corridor were later adapted for rail use by the Western New York and Pennsylvania Railway, and remnants of these earlier transportation systems remained visible in the area. This continuity helps explain why Scottsville retains such a strong architectural and historical connection to its nineteenth-century development.

The Rochester Street Historic District is especially significant for preserving that era of prosperity. In addition to its general historic character, the district includes a notable concentration of early to mid-nineteenth-century residences, many of them reflecting the Greek Revival style that was popular during Scottsville’s years of canal-era growth. Together with the village’s individually listed historic properties, the district helps document the built legacy of Scottsville’s emergence as an agricultural, commercial, and transportation center.

Scottsville was formally incorporated as a village in 1914.

The following sites are on the National Register of Historic Places: Isaac Cox Cobblestone Farmstead, Cox–Budlong House, Grace Church, David McVean House, Simeon Sage House, William Shirts House, Union Presbyterian Church, and Windom Hall. The Rochester Street Historic District is a national historic district listed in 1973.

== Geography ==
Scottsville is located in southwestern Monroe County at 43°1′19″N 77°45′13″W (43.021813, -77.753545), in the northeast part of the town of Wheatland. It is 12 miles (19 km) southwest of the center of Rochester.

New York State Route 383 passes through the village as Main Street and Rochester Street, leading northeast to Rochester and west 6 miles (10 km) to Mumford. State Route 253 leads east from Scottsville 8 miles (13 km) to Henrietta; State Route 251 leads east-southeast 7 miles (11 km) to Rush; and State Route 386 leads north 6 miles (10 km) to Chili.

According to the U.S. Census Bureau, the village has a total area of 1.1 square miles (2.8 km^{2}), of which 0.005 square miles (0.013 km^{2}), or 0.46%, are water. Oatka Creek runs along the southern border of the village and flows east 1 mile (1.6 km) to its mouth at the Genesee River.

== Demographics ==
Historical population
Census	Pop.	Note	%±
1870	119		—
1880	784		558.8%
1920	784		—
1930	936		19.4%
1940	925		−1.2%
1950	1,025		10.8%
1960	1,863		81.8%
1970	1,967		5.6%
1980	1,789		−9.0%
1990	1,912		6.9%
2000	2,128		11.3%
2010	2,001		−6.0%
2020	2,009		0.4%
U.S. decennial census

As of the census of 2020, there were 2,009 people, 1048 households, and 623 families residing in the village. The population density was 1,826.3 inhabitants per square mile (705.1/km^{2}). There were 900 housing units at an average density of 818.1 per square mile (315.9/km^{2}). The racial makeup of the village was 85.4% White, 3.03% African American, 0.59% Native American, 1.84% Asian, 0.09% Pacific Islander, 0.64% from other races, and 0.05% from two or more races. Hispanic or Latino of any race were 4.77% of the population.

There were 1048 households, out of which 23.9% had children under the age of 18 living with them, 47.0% were married couples living together, 28.9% had a female householder with no husband present. 24.9% of all households were made up of individuals, and 10.1% had someone living alone who was 65 years of age or older. The average household size was 2.21 and the average family size was 2.76.

In the village, the population was spread out, with 19.5% under the age of 18, 2.6% from 15 to 19, 4.1% from 20 to 24, 19.4% from 25 to 34, 13.9% from 35 to 44, and 17.5% who were 65 years of age or older. The median age was 39.5 years. For every 100 females, there were 105 males.

The median income for a household in the village was $60,469 and the median income for a family was $69,417. Males had a median income of $55,227 versus $52,000 for females. The per capita income for the village was $33,499. About 9.1% of families and 15.2% of the population were below the poverty line, including 40% of those under age 18 and 2.4% of those age 65 or over.

== Local government ==
Village government is headed by the mayor and the board of trustees, and is located in a renovated building at 22 Main Street.

== Education ==
Public schools are under the jurisdiction of the Wheatland-Chili Central School District and include an elementary school, middle school and high school.

== See also ==
- Scottsville Free Library
