= Isaac Scott (musician) =

American singer

- Born: Isaac Scott III; June 11, 1945; Vancouver, Washington, United States
- Died: November 16, 2001 (aged 56) Edmonds, Washington, United States
- Genres: Blues, soul, gospel
- Occupations: Guitarist, singer
- Instruments: Guitar, vocals
- Years active: Late 1960s–2001
- Label: Various including Red Lightnin' Records

Isaac Scott III (June 11, 1945 – November 16, 2001), was an American blues guitarist and singer. He recorded a studio album in 1982, and a couple of live affairs in his lifetime, and was strongly linked to Seattle, Washington with its own blues scene, having moved to the city in the early 1970s.

His influences included Albert Collins and Jimi Hendrix. Two of his obituaries noted that Scott might have achieved greater national fame, if he had been able to write his own material. By contrast, seven of the nine tracks on Scott's 1982 album, Big Times Blues Man, were self-penned.

== Biography ==
Scott was born in Vancouver, Washington, United States, before relocating with his family to Portland, Oregon, when he was in his childhood. Whilst there the young Scott was exposed to both gospel music and blues. Self-taught on both the piano and guitar, his early musical experiences involved playing guitar with gospel based groups, including touring the West Coast with the Five Blind Boys of Mississippi in the early 1970s. By 1974, when he began to live in Seattle, Scott decided to concentrate on playing the blues, having been influenced by Albert Collins. His repertoire and style continued to exhibit elements of blues, gospel and soul, and in emulating Collins played by plucking his guitar with his thumb rather than utilising a pick. "I've had a lot of rock influences. Jimi Hendrix for one, a big influence," Scott related in an interview in 1984. "But basically I think Jimi had that blues thing deep inside. If you listen to "Voodoo Chile," you can tell those blues roots." His decision to stay and mainly play around the West Coast for almost thirty years helped to define a sound for the area, whilst Scott was hailed as a founding father in the clubs that were lined along Seattle's First Avenue.

A fellow musician noted that Scott was ill for a lot of his time in his own twenties. "I'm trying to burn out this bug I got," he would say. This was the start of hypertension and what turned out to diabetes, that dogged him most of his adult life. In 1979, Scott recorded live his debut album, The Isaac Scott Blues Band. Three years later, he released what turned out be his only studio-based album, Big Time Blues Man, also on Red Lightnin' Records. The effects of his ongoing diabetes became so acute that, in 1987, he had his left foot and right leg amputated. However, he continued to perform in a wheelchair, donned in black to match his on-stage attire. In 1996, High Class Woman was issued, which was another live recording. His work also appeared on the compilation albums, Live at the San Francisco Jazz Festival and Live at the Roadhouse.

He was inducted into the Washington Blues Society's Hall of Fame in 1991 and achieved their lifetime-achievement award in 2000. Scott also performed at the opening of the Experience Music Project in 2000. Scott was insistent on maintaining his own guitars. His former wife, Eloise DePoe, told the Seattle Times she once found his guitar in the bathtub when he was stripping the varnish, and then lost part of her dresser, as the mahogany was utilised in the rebuilding of the neck of his guitar.

Scott died on November 16, 2001, in Edmonds, Washington, from the complications of diabetes, at the age of 56.

== Discography ==
=== Albums ===
| Year | Title | Record label | Type |
|---|---|---|---|
| 1979 | The Isaac Scott Blues Band | Red Lightnin' Records | Live album |
| 1982 | Big Time Blues Man | Red Lightnin' Records | Studio album |
| 1996 | High Class Woman | Shakira Productions | Live album |
| 2008 | Posthumous Blues Live | CD Baby | Live album |
