= Garbutt, New York =

- Hamlet
- Location within New York Location within the United States
- Coordinates: 43°00′45.89″N 77°47′30.11″W
- Country: United States
- State: New York
- County: Monroe
- Town: Wheatland
- Settled: 1804; 222 years ago
- Founder: Zachariah Garbutt
- Elevation: 597 ft (182 m)
- Time zone: UTC-5 (EST)
  - Summer (DST): UTC-4 (EDT)
- ZIP Code: 14546 (Scottsville)
- Area code: 585

Garbutt, New York is a hamlet in Monroe County, New York, United States. It is located within the town of Wheatland between the village of Scottsville and the hamlet of Mumford. It sits at the intersection of Scottsville-Mumford Road and Union Street. The hamlet grew rapidly through the mid-nineteenth century, but starting in the late nineteenth and early twentieth centuries the collapse of the local economy caused the population to severely decline.

== History ==
In its 19th-century prime, Garbutt boasted a train station and rail yard, service by two railroad companies, several industrial plants, a hotel, two schools, a church, mines, three Oatka Creek bridges, a dam and millpond, a barrel factory, and a number of general stores. Yet, as long ago as 1937, it was said, "Garbutt is a hamlet so small that it would scarcely be noticed in passing were it not for the large buildings of the Empire Gypsum Company." Now, even these are gone.

The history of Garbutt was written by Carl F. Schmidt, an architect locally noted for his histories of the area, and George Engs Slocum, a local business and civic figure whose history of the town appeared in the very early twentieth century. In 1998 (Slocum) and 2002 (Schmidt), the Wheatland Historical Association reprinted their books. The Garbuttsville Cemetery was listed on the National Register of Historic Places in 2006.

== Oatka Creek ==
If any single natural feature has shaped Garbutt's history, it is Oatka Creek. Draining some 215 square miles (557 km^{2}) of land, the Oatka is the third largest tributary of the Genesee River's lower basin. Although too shallow for any but the lightest of boats, its water provided the power for milling first lumber and grain and then gypsum products in Garbutt.

== Notable people ==
- John Garbutt (ca. 1779 - 1855), politician
