= John Garbutt =

American politician

John Garbutt (c.1779 Northumberland, England – 1855 Garbutt, New York) was an American politician from New York.

== Life ==
He was the son of Zachariah Garbutt and Phebe (Nairn) Garbutt. He married Mercy Cady (b. 1788), and they had three children.

John Garbutt was a shoemaker, a farmer, a surveyor and a politician. He worked at his trade, supervised his farm, surveyed many of the highways of Caledonia and Wheatland, and filled many town offices.

He was Supervisor of the Town of Caledonia in 1820. On February 23, 1821, the Town of Inverness was separated from Caledonia, but Garbutt—who was English-born—took exception to the Scottish name, and on April 3, 1821, the State Legislature changed the name to Wheatland thus honoring indirectly Garbutt who ran the local flour mill. Garbutt was the first Supervisor of the Town of Wheatland.

He was a member of the New York State Assembly (Monroe Co.) in 1829.

== Sources ==
- The New York Civil List compiled by Franklin Benjamin Hough (pages 208 and 275; Weed, Parsons and Co., 1858)
