= Wheatland Center, New York =

Wheatland Center, Wheatland, New York Hall's Corners
- hamlet
- Interactive map of Wheatland Center, Wheatland, New York
- Coordinates: 43°00′46.37″N 77°49′6.37″W
- Country: United States
- State: New York
- County: Monroe
- Town: Wheatland
- Elevation: 634 ft (193 m)
- Time zone: UTC-5 (EST)
  - Summer (DST): UTC-4 (EDT)
- ZIP code: 14546
- Area code: 585

Wheatland Center is the rural area in the Town of Wheatland surrounding the intersection of Wheatland Center and Scottsville-Mumford Roads. Once known as Hall's Corners, it today shows little evidence of its past.

A wallboard plant mentioned in Carl F. Schmidt's 1953 book went out of business as a result of competition. The plant has been expanded and remodeled for use as a metals reclamation center, recovering silver from spent photographic materials.

The area on the west side of Wheatland Center Road and between North and Scottsville-Mumford Roads once held houses and businesses. Today, there is nothing there but scrub land on the eastern side of the former gravel pit.

The US Census Bureau does not maintain demographic data for Mumford.
