= David McVean House =

Historic house in New York, United States

- U.S. National Register of Historic Places
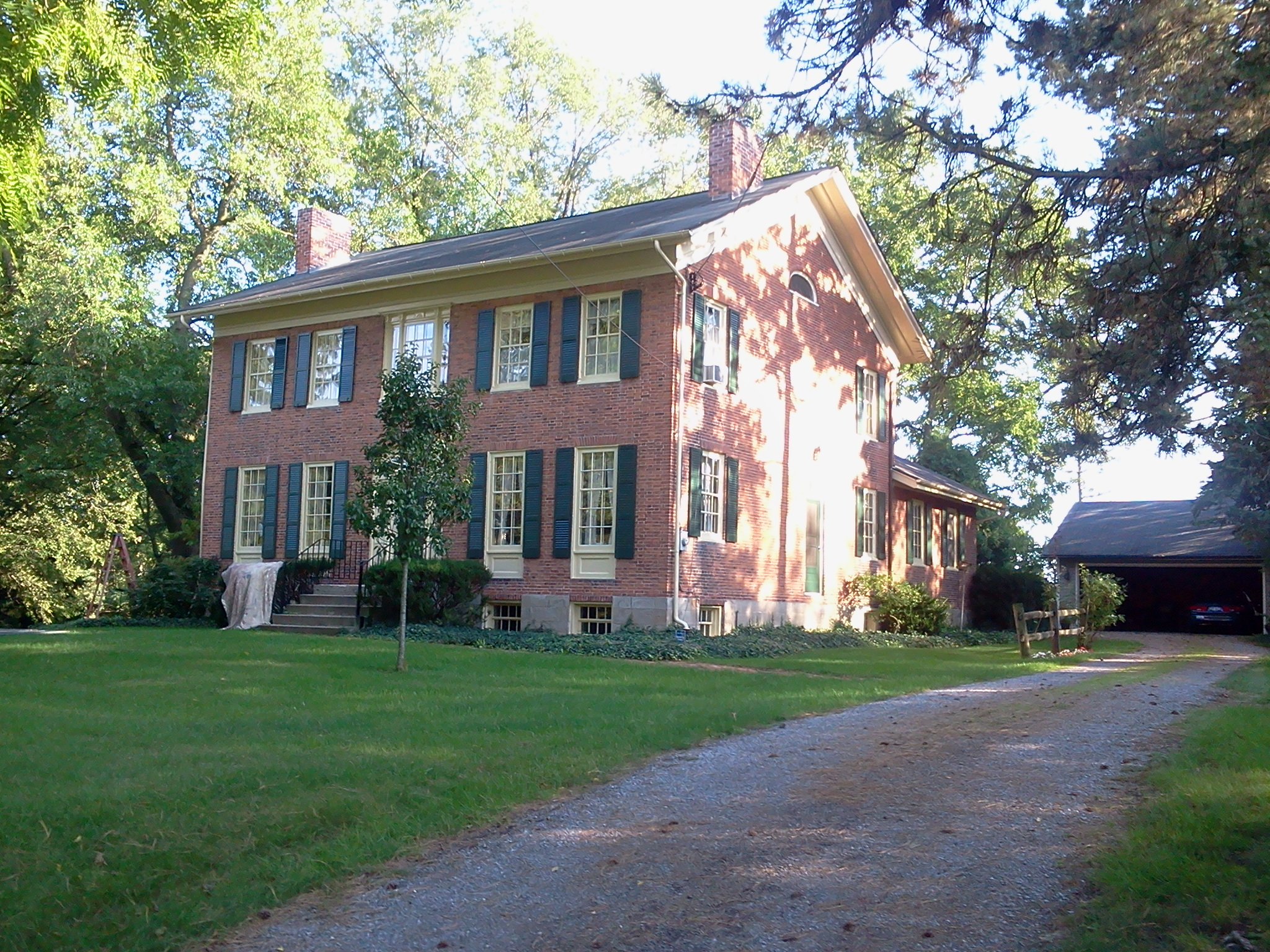

- Location within New York Location within the United States
- Location: 805 North Rd., Scottsville, New York
- Coordinates: 43°1′41″N 77°45′38″W
- Area: 5.3 acres (2.1 ha)
- Architectural style: Federal
- NRHP reference No.: 05001531
- Added to NRHP: January 18, 2006

David McVean House, also known as the McVean-Jones-Reeves House, is a historic home located at Scottsville in Monroe County, New York. It is a brick vernacular Federal-style house on a pargeted cut-stone foundation. The five-by-three-bay main block is two stories in height, while the rear wing is one and one-half stories.

It was listed on the National Register of Historic Places in 2006.
