= Isaac Scott (pioneer) =

- Grave site of Isaac and Lydia in Oatka Cemetery
- Born: 1745; New Hampshire
- Died: June 2, 1818; Scottsville, New York, US
- Resting place: Oatka Cemetery
- Occupations: Farmer, tavern keeper
- Known for: Founder of Scottsville, New York

Isaac Scott (c.1745 – June 2, 1818) was a pioneer, farmer, and tavern owner. He is considered the founder of Scottsville, New York, as his farmland took up the majority of the modern village.

Scott came from New Hampshire with his wife, three daughters, and their husbands, and settled in Scottsville (then known as Northampton) in 1790, purchasing land then owned by the Wadsworth family. He built a log cabin west of Canawaugus Street (now Rochester Street/NYS Routes 251 and 383), north of Oatka Creek and south of what is now Main Street (NYS Route 386). The cabin was the first house built in the village. Scott built an addition to the cabin in 1800 and opened it as a tavern.

Scott served Northampton as the Fence Viewer, Path Master, and Commissioner of Highways. Scott died in 1818 at the age of 73 and was buried in Oatka Cemetery.
