= Cotton Creek =

Stream in the American state of Missouri

Cotton Creek is a stream in Oregon County in the Ozarks of southern Missouri. It is a tributary of Frederick Creek.

The stream headwaters are at 36°32′52″N 91°16′33″W and the confluence wit Frederick Creek is at 36°35′04″N 91°14′38″W.

Cotton Creek was so named on account of cotton fields near its course.

== See also ==
- List of rivers of Missouri
