= Ebenezer Allan =

American British Loyalist (1752–1813)

Ebenezer "Indian" Allan
- Born: 1752; New Jersey
- Died: April 13, 1813 (aged 60–61); Delaware, Ontario

Ebenezer “Indian” Allan (1752 – April 13, 1813) was a frontier settler and trader in the Genesee Valley. A British Loyalist during the American Revolution, Allan went on to become the first white settler in Rochester, New York. Allan acquired the nickname "Indian" due to his close association with the Haudenosaunee during his most active years.

== American Revolution activities ==
Allan was born in New Jersey in 1752. Around 1780, he joined with Colonel John Butler as a British Loyalist in the American Revolution. Along with Haudenosaunee allies, Butler's Rangers attacked white American settlers in the Genesee Valley area. Allan was sent by the British to their Indian Department and became a spy for them in 1781. He took up residence with Mary Jemison, the famed "White Woman of the Genesee" in Mount Morris around this time.

With the end of the war, Allan was dismissed from the Indian Department. His focus shifted to helping broker a peace deal between the Haudenosaunee and the American settlers. This led to him being arrested by British officials in December 1783 and imprisoned in multiple locations still in British possession.

== Settler life ==
Upon his release in 1786, Allan briefly moved to a site on Oatka Creek 600 yards west of its mouth with the Genesee River. The 475 acre plot had been gifted to him by landowners Phelps and Gorham in gratitude for his services in the peace treaty. His farm was the first white settlement in what would become Wheatland, New York.

In spring of 1790, Allan sold his property to Peter Sheffer I for $2.50 per acre, and moved north to a site on the falls of the Genesee River. There on a small natural island he built a saw and grist mill. With his residence at the site, Allan became the first white settler of what would become Rochester, New York. The mills were intended by Phelps and Gorham as a place for the Haudenosaunee to grind their maize, but were not a successful business venture. The mill location did serve as a meeting area between cultures and a frontier outpost in an otherwise sparsely populated area. The established site went through a few owners before being purchased by a group led by future city namesake and founder Nathaniel Rochester.

Allan moved further west in 1794, settling on land near modern Windsor, Ontario. Allan got in trouble with government officials for his failure to build a promised church. Around 1805 he was imprisoned for an unknown offense in Turkey Point, Ontario.

Allan became an American sympathizer active in Ontario during the War of 1812. After brief imprisonment at Niagara-on-the-Lake, Allan died in Delaware Township, Ontario on April 13, 1813.

== Personal life ==
Allan was a colorful and controversial figure in his own time, as his history mixed documented facts with frontier legend. Historical accounts describe him having a reputation for violence and instability. While contemporary Peter Sheffer Jr. described Allan as courteous and affable, later local historian Arch Merrill described him as "violent, audacious, lawless and sometimes cruel." 20th Century researcher Morley B. Turpin credits much of the outrageous stories as being either fabrications by Allan's enemies or Allan's own bragging.

Historians indicate that he was a polygamist, having married first Kyen-da-nent or Sally, a sister of the Seneca chief Captain Bull in 1780. While living at the Oatka Creek site with Sally, he married a woman named Lucy Chapman. Lucy gave birth to a son named Seneca, the first white child born west of the Genesee River. He later married an additional woman, Mary (Milly) Gregory.
