= Oatka Creek =

Tributary of Genesee River in U.S. state of New York

Oatka Creek Allan's Creek
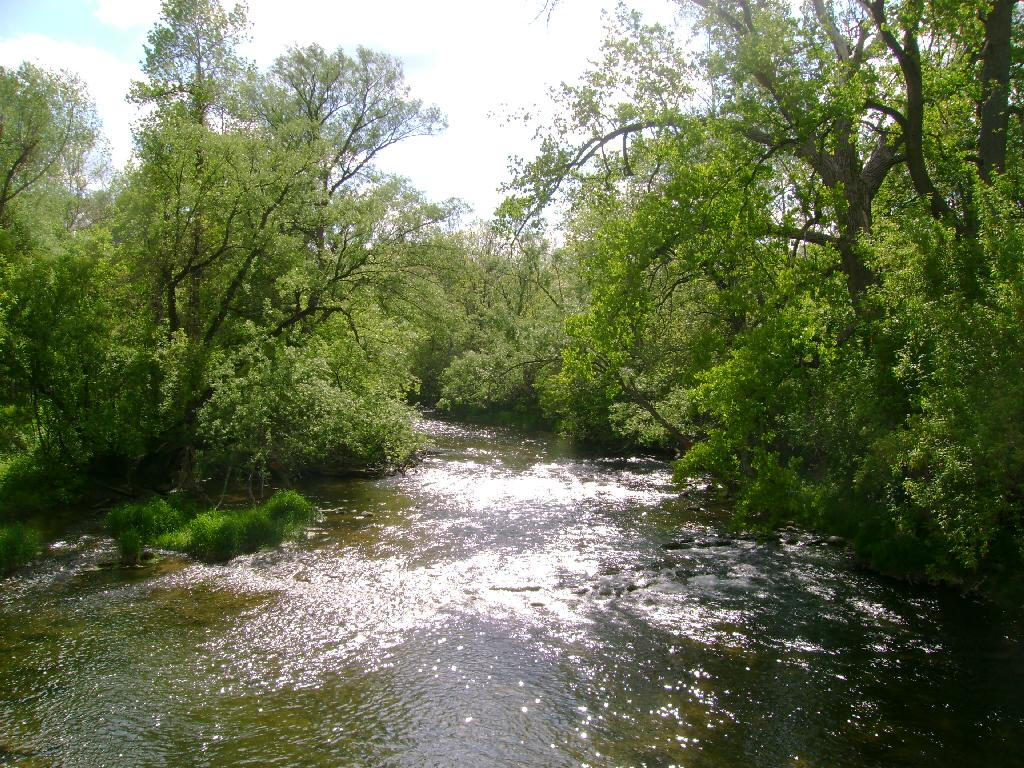
- Oatka Creek in Wheatland

- Genesee River map showing Oatka on upper left
- Etymology: "Leaving the highlands" in Seneca

Location
- Country: United States
- State: New York
- Region: Western New York
- Counties: Wyoming, Genesee, Monroe
- Towns: Gainesville, Warsaw, Middlebury, Covington, Pavilion, Stafford, Le Roy, Wheatland

Physical characteristics
- Source
  - location: Near Gainesville-Warsaw town line
  - coordinates: 42.7237°N 78.0917°W
  - elevation: 1,510 ft (460 m)
- Mouth: Genesee River
  - location: 1 mi (1.6 km) east of Scottsville
  - coordinates: 43.0242°N 77.7301°W
  - elevation: 500 ft (150 m)
- Length: 58 mi (93 km)
- Basin size: 215 mi^{2} (560 km^{2})
- Discharge
  - location: Garbutt
  - average: 215.3 cu ft/s (6.10 m^{3}/s)
  - minimum: 0.9 cu ft/s (0.025 m^{3}/s) (August 1, 1965)
  - maximum: 7,050 cu ft/s (200 m^{3}/s) (March 31, 1960)
- Discharge
  - location: Warsaw
  - average: 67 cu ft/s (1.9 m^{3}/s)
  - maximum: 4,110 cu ft/s (116 m^{3}/s)

Basin features
- Tributaries
  - left: Cotton Creek, Relyea Creek, Stony Creek
  - right: Mud Creek

Oatka Creek (/oʊˈætkə/ oh-AT-kə) is the third longest tributary of the Genesee River, located entirely in the Western New York region of the U.S. state of New York. From southern Wyoming County, it flows 58 miles (93 km) to the Genesee near Scottsville, draining an area of 215 square miles (560 km^{2}) that includes all or part of 23 towns and villages in Wyoming, Genesee, Livingston and Monroe counties as well. Its name means "leaving the highlands" or "approaching an opening" in Seneca.

Like its parent stream it originated during the end of the last Ice Age, as glacial impact on the upper Allegheny Plateau created a rolling landscape streams could gradually erode through, The Oatka carved a deep groove known today as the Oatka Valley, where the upper creek's two major settlements would be established. Native Americans of the Seneca nation established a few settlements along it where clearings arose in the forest. The Revolutionary War's Sullivan Expedition brought the valley's fertile soil to the attention of the emerging nation, and the region was opened for settlement shortly after the war.

For a time the Oatka was called Allan's Creek after the area's first settler, Ebenezer "Indian" Allan. Its waterpower facilitated early 19th-century European settlement of the abundant fertile lands in the Holland Purchase. Today it remains an important regional resource, used for water supply and recreational purposes, and actively protected to assure water quality. It is a popular trout stream, stocked from the oldest fish hatchery in the Western Hemisphere near its mouth. A dam in Le Roy makes the section below it a losing stream, dry during the warm months of the year as the stream flows through subterranean channels.

== Course ==
Several small streams, some of which ultimately rise to the north at elevations of almost 1,600 feet (490 m), come together to create the main stem of the creek amid the fields and woodlots on the high plateau in Gainesville just south of the Warsaw town line, a short distance west of Silver Spring Road. The new stream flows first south a mile, then turns northwest paralleling the Norfolk Southern railroad tracks toward the small hamlet of Rock Glen. There it crosses for the first time New York State Route 19 (NY 19), which it will parallel closely for much of the rest of its length.

To the west of Rock Glen, it passes through the narrow gorge that gave it its name, emerging at another hamlet, Newburg, at the head of the Oatka Valley it follows for the rest of its run. Again crossing under Route 19, it has descended 280 feet (85 m) since its rise. From Newburg it meanders northwest, then north, staying close to the highway on the valley floor.

Several miles further downstream it enters Warsaw, the county seat. It goes under Route 19 again and trends to the west, flowing under U.S. Route 20A to pass to the west of Warsaw High School and its athletic fields. North of the village the valley widens, staying generally level. The creek and NY 19 cross again amid large cultivated fields.

The valley begins to angle northeasterly towards Wyoming, which the Oatka bypasses to the southeast into a large wooded area. It then passes through the largest wetlands along it course. North of that it crosses Route 19 again as that road turns eastward briefly. The two return to each other when they cross into Genesee County at Pavilion, where NY 63 crosses as they resume a northward heading, and there is another significant wetlands area.

In another small wood two miles (3.2 km) north of Pavilion, US 20 crosses. The creek bends west, reaching its greatest distance from Route 19, then north-northeast back to the highway's vicinity. It enters the village of Le Roy on a northeast course, crossing Route 19 again as it widens into a 26-acre (11 ha) reservoir behind the dam just south of NY 5.

It narrows again north of the village towards Buttermilk Falls and the section that flows underground in warm, dry weather. The valley here is broad, its walls now long and gently sloped instead of steep and short. After going over the 60-foot (18 m) falls, marking the Onondaga Escarpment, it turns east, leaving NY 19 a mile south of the New York State Thruway. This geologically distinct section is known as the lower Oatka. It dips south, north and then south again through a largely wooded area as it approaches Genesee Country Village and enters Monroe County near Mumford.

After bypassing that hamlet to the north, NY 383 parallels on the north and the CSX rail line across New York on the south, as the creek reaches Oatka Creek Park, a large tract of former farmland to its south. Here both road and rail are to the north of the stream, widening again. Beyond the park it enters an area of predominantly farmland again as it passes south of Scottsville, where NY 251 enters the village by bridging the Oatka. A mile further along, it empties into the Genesee.

== Watershed ==
External image
- Map of the Oatka watershed

The Oatka's basin is relatively narrow and does not extend far from the Oatka Valley or the towns through which the creek itself flows. Almost all of the towns of Warsaw, Pavilion and Le Roy are within the watershed, along with large portions of Covington, Gainesville, Middlebury and Wheatland. Most of the eastern half of Stafford is in the Oatka basin even though only a small portion of the creek flows through it.

In Livingston County Caledonia is the only town with land in the watershed, consisting mostly of its northeastern corner and most of the village of Caledonia. Other towns with no portions of the creek itself having large sections within its basin are Perry, Orangeville, and Bethany. Small portions of Castile, Wethersfield, Byron and Bergen also drain into the Oatka.

There are five villages wholly or partially within the watershed. The former are Warsaw, Wyoming and Le Roy. Closer to its mouth are Scottsville and Caledonia. These are the only concentrated areas of development and population within it. The majority (73%) of the watershed is active or inactive agricultural land. Forests cover another 21%. Most of the remainder is residential or commercial land, with industrial use accounting for just 1%.

The watershed's highest point of 1,990 feet (610 m) is located in southeastern Orangeville; its lowest point, 525 feet (160 m), is the Oatka's mouth. Including the Oatka itself, there are 425 miles (684 km) of stream in the watershed.

There are few significant lakes or ponds within the watershed. The largest is Lake Le Roy, near the headwaters of Mud Creek in Pavilion. It is a 59-acre (24 ha) reservoir that once served as the main water supply for the village of Le Roy. The only protected area in the Oatka watershed besides Oatka Creek Park is the 2,580-acre (1,040 ha) Carlton Hill Wildlife Management Area in Middlebury, north of Warsaw.

=== Water quality ===
The United States Geological Survey maintains two stream gauges on the creek, at Garbutt near the mouth and Warsaw below its headwaters. Average annual streamflow is 55 cubic feet per second (1.6 m^{3}/s) at the upstream station and 219 cubic feet per second (6.2 m^{3}/s) downstream. Flow at Warsaw averages 21–36% of what it is at Garbutt, but is much higher downstream in springtime and after significant runoff events.

Only one community along the creek, the village of Warsaw, uses it as a water supply, putting it through a filtration plant before distributing it to residents and other customers. Its wastewater treatment plant is downstream of the intake. Le Roy also has state permits to discharge effluent into the stream from their wastewater plants, along with the Lapp Insulators plant in Le Roy and the fish hatchery in Caledonia (via the Spring Creek tributary). The latter has the highest permitted discharge of any permit in the Oatka watershed. The villages of Caledonia and Wyoming, and one of Pavilion's water districts, use wells in the watershed.

The creek's water quality has been extensively studied in its lower watershed, below Buttermilk Falls. Most chemicals within it are within normal limits, with slightly higher levels of sulfates due to the gypsum and dolomite present in the bedrock. Those minerals also produce detectable magnesium and strontium levels as well. Trichloroethylene is sometimes found as well, the legacy of a spill from a railroad accident near Le Roy in the early 1970s. During high-runoff events, fecal coliform in the lower Oatka sometimes exceeds permitted levels.

There are no major issues at present that could significantly degrade water quality on most of the stream. Accordingly, the state's Department of Environmental Conservation (DEC) classifies the Monroe and Genesee sections of the stream as "threatened", since some issues could arise in the future. The Wyoming County portion is considered "stressed", in that while its quality is generally good, occasional issues arise that limit use.

In 1999, following a "Caring for Creeks" conference in Rochester, the Oatka Creek Watershed Committee was formed. It sponsored research into the stream and watershed, including the first "State of the Basin" report two years later. Intermunicipal agreements were adopted in 2004, and an outline for an Oatka Creek Watershed Management Plan was adopted in 2006, in cooperation with the Genesee/Finger Lakes Regional Planning Council.

== Wildlife ==
There is limited data on the fish and plant species that thrive in and around the creek as no comprehensive survey has been done. The state has identified several communities of species it lists as rare, threatened or endangered. To protect them more effectively it has limited publication of the exact species or location of the communities.

More specific data exists on benthic macroinvertebrates, or larger organisms that depend on the sediment on the stream floor. These are primarily the immature forms of insects that live on land as adults. Many of these species, such as caddisflies and stoneflies, are pollution-intolerant and thus their presence is an indicator of good water quality. They were found during a 1989–90 survey of the lower Oatka, but in lower numbers than expected. The stream is thus considered "slightly impacted" by pollution.

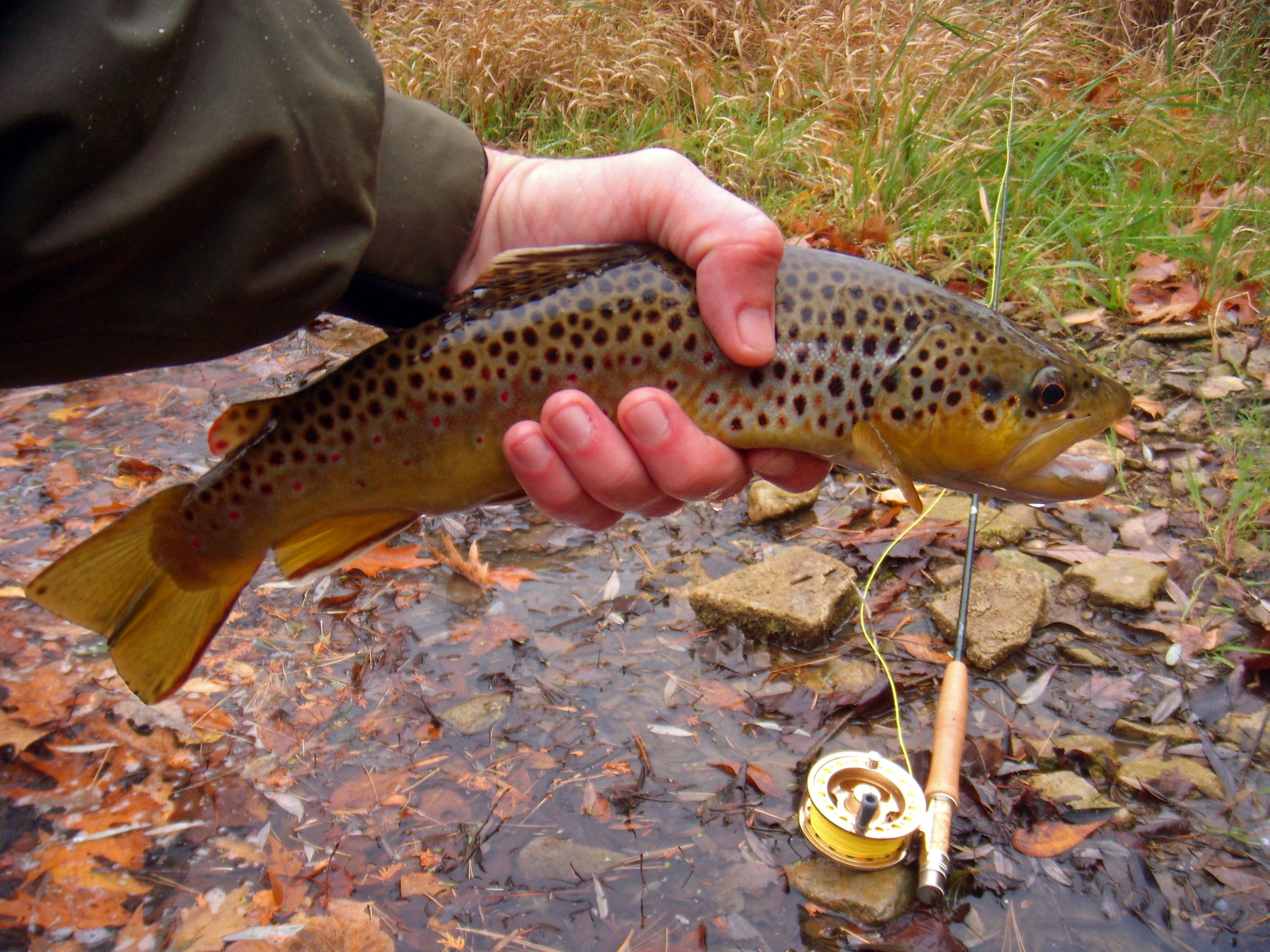
A brown trout taken from the Oatka

Many of those insects constitute the food supply for various trout species. The lower Oatka is considered a blue-ribbon brown trout fishery, with some brook trout populating the water as well. The state fish hatchery on Spring Creek near Caledonia stocks the stream annually, and there is also evidence of a wild trout fishery on the stretch between Bowerman and Wheatland Center roads. A 1999 survey estimated the creek's total trout biomass at 30 pounds per acre (33 kg per hectare) bass, walleye and northern pike have also been taken near the Genesee.

== Geology ==
Buttermilk Falls divides Oatka Creek into two distinct geological regions. The upper stream's bedrock is local sedimentary rock formations, with the shales and sandstones of the Sonyea Group, shale-limestone Genesee Group and Tully Limestone dominating from the headwaters to Pavilion. Between there and Le Roy the shales and thin limestones of the Hamilton Group underlie the creek.

North of Le Roy, the Oatka becomes a losing stream, with water disappearing into the ground. In the warmer months this results in the creekbed drying up above Buttermilk Falls, and slowly re-emerging further down from springs and seeps. After it does, and turns to the east, it flows over the Akron Formation, Bertie Group of dolomitic shales, and the Salina Group. The latter is diverse, including evaporites such as halite and gypsum in addition to its limestones and shales.

In the lower section of the creek there is significant groundwater entering the creek. As it discharges, it weathers the gypsum and limestone. This results in increased sulfates in the water, and bicarbonates and calcium have also been found near the falls. These concentrations are in winter and spring, when heavier precipitation and runoff offsets the impact of the groundwater.

== History ==
As the glaciers retreated 12,000 years ago the landscape they left behind on the Allegheny Plateau was a rolling expanse of drumlins and depressions in which meltwater and precipitation could accumulate. It was ideal topography for stream formation, and these bodies of water eventually combined and became the Oatka, eroding the Oatka Valley. Fertile soil from the highlands accumulated in the valley, and the land eventually reforested.

The Native Americans who would become the Seneca nation eventually came and settled in the area. They established a few small communities at the clearings in the forest where they found good hunting, and were first to farm the lands in the valley. The network of trails that connected them eventually became part of today's road network in the area. The Senecas eventually became part of the Iroquois Confederation, where the Oatka was at the very westernmost extent, giving them the honorific "Keepers of the Western Door" within the Confederation.

In 1779, during the Revolutionary War the Continental Army's Sullivan Expedition came into Western New York to suppress Senecas who had professed loyalty to the British or might do so. Many of the troops came from farms in New England and recognized the quality of land in the Oatka watershed. After the war they agitated for it to be opened to settlement. After the war, New York and Massachusetts resolved the latter's claim to the area, and the 1797 Treaty of Big Tree (today Geneseo) extinguished all Native land claims.

The first settler along the Oatka was Ebenezer "Indian" Allan, who established himself near the mouth of the stream, in today's Wheatland, in 1786. The creek would be known as Allan's Creek for years afterwards. After he moved further down the Genesee, other settlers came, the beginnings of what became Scottsville. In the 1790s settlement progressed upstream with the establishment of Le Roy where the stream intersected an old Indian trail that later became New York State Route 5. Settlement moved quickly afterwards, with all present communities as far south as Gainesville seeing their first settlers in the opening years of the 19th century, when the Holland Land Company owned much of it.

== River modifications ==
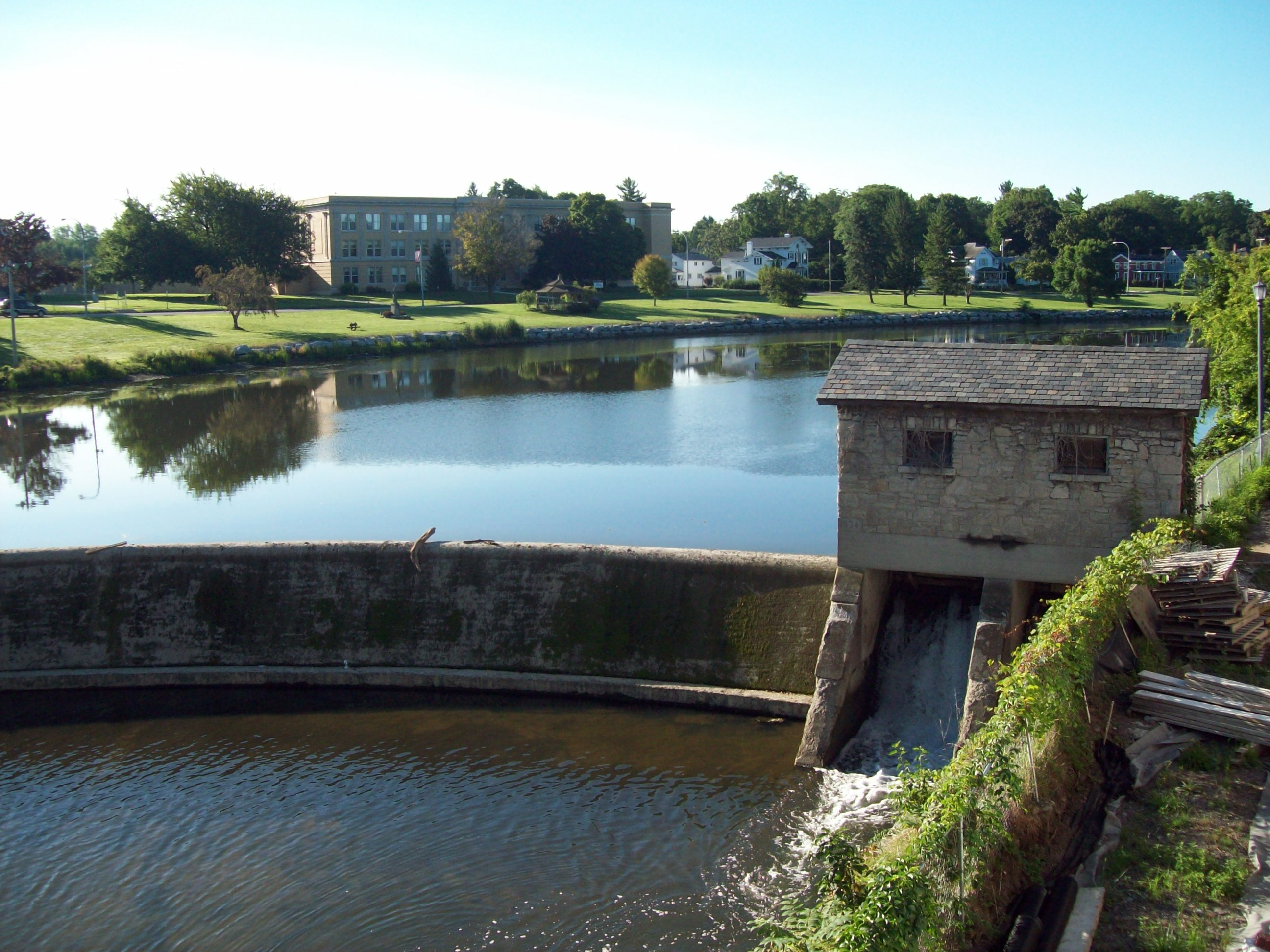
Dam and reservoir at Le Roy

The only significant change made to the river by human engineering is the dam at Le Roy near where Route 5 crosses the creek. It creates a 25-acre (10 ha) lake in the center of the village. Other dams or diversions that were created for milling purposes in the 19th century have been abandoned and/or removed. There are no power plants or flood control projects along the creek.

There are 32 bridges currently spanning the creek, built between 1915 and 2003. The oldest carries Union Street in Wheatland; the newest is the NY 251 bridge into Scottsville above the creek's mouth. Seven of them carry NY 19 over the creek. These include both the longest, the 227-foot (69 m) crossing over the lake created by the Le Roy dam, northernmost along Route 19, and the shortest and southernmost, its 29-foot (8.8 m) bridge south of Rock Glen. Most are steel or concrete stringer or box girder structures, with the US 20 bridge in Pavilion and one of the Route 19 bridges north of Warsaw being steel truss designs.

== Economy ==
In the early days of settlement the creek contributed directly to the local economy through the mills established along it. They were removed in later years when industrialization elsewhere made them less profitable. Today the creek's direct economic value comes from its role as a water supply and discharge for the wastewater of the two most populous villages along it, Le Roy and Warsaw.

The narrow and deep Oatka Valley was a preferred transportation corridor through eastern Wyoming and Genesee counties. First came the road that became Route 19 in 1930. In 1874 it was paralleled by the Rochester and State Line Railroad; today operated by Norfolk Southern after many ownership changes. Intersections with major east–west routes that became NY 5 and US 20A prompted the development of Le Roy and Warsaw around them.

=== Recreation ===
Oatka Creek's primary direct contribution to the local economy today is as a scenic and recreational resource. The former is enhanced by the Oatka Valley. The latter consists of hiking, boating and primarily angling in three distinct fisheries.

The upper creek, above Warsaw, is stocked with 1,850 yearling brown trout in the spring of each year, supplementing an indigenous wild population. DEC surveys have found that by June few of the stocked trout remain, showing that the stretch has heavy fishing pressure. The record size for trout taken from this stretch is 16 inches (410 mm). DEC has not acquired any public fishing rights along the four miles (6.4 km) south of, but public access is relatively unhindered as there are several bridges, paralleling railroad tracks (both of which automatically create public access to adjacent areas of the stream under New York law) and the area is otherwise lightly posted against trespassing.

From Warsaw to Le Roy, the stream matures and warms. This is conducive to different species of sport fish, particularly bass, pike, sunfish, crappies and bullhead. There is access from bridges and some public land owned by municipalities in the area.

The lower Oatka is the portion most popular with fly fishermen. The groundwater infusions from the Blue Hole and falls cool the creek again; from the bend eastward to its mouth it is a freestone stream with a large population of stocked and wild brown trout. The 11,200 fry added to the waters each year come from the state fish hatchery north of Caledonia on the Oatka's Spring Creek tributary established in 1864 by Seth Green, the oldest such facility in the Western Hemisphere. Brown trout was first introduced to American waters from it; today the 170,000 pounds (77,000 kg) of fish produced supply almost all of the state's stocked streams.

Public access to this section is extensive. The 1.7-mile (2.7 km) section in Oatka Creek Park is the most frequently used, since special regulations to conserve the wild trout population there allow no-kill fishing there with artificial lures year-round. Similar rules apply between October and March in the less-accessible stretch downstream of the park to Bowerman Road; during the regular season anglers are limited to two fish per day at a 12-inch (30 cm) minimum. Black bass and northern pike have also taken flies in those waters.

Access is also available from a small Scottsville village park on the south bank east of Route 251, the hundred feet on the other side of that highway and both sides of the NY 36 bridge near Wheatland Center, as well as 50 ft (15 m) on either side of county roads that cross the creek. DEC has also acquired public fishing easements on a small stretch in Mumford and much of both banks along Oatka Trail in the Town of Le Roy between Mud Creek and the unnamed northern tributary two miles (3.2 km) upstream. These allow use of the 33 feet (11 m) adjoining the river by anglers for access to the water. They are subject to regular DEC fishing regulations.

== Tributaries ==
- Relyea Creek
- Stony Creek
- Pearl Creek
- White Creek
- Mud Creek
- Spring Creek

== See also ==
- List of New York rivers
