= Mumford, New York =

- Hamlet
- Interactive map of Mumford, New York
- Coordinates: 42°59′48.99″N 77°51′42.91″W
- Country: United States
- State: New York
- County: Monroe
- Town: Wheatland
- Elevation: 617 ft (188 m)
- Time zone: UTC-5 (EST)
  - Summer (DST): UTC-4 (EDT)
- ZIP Code: 14511
- Area code: 585

The hamlet of Mumford lies in the western part of the town of Wheatland, Monroe County, New York, United States, south of Oatka Creek on NY 36 and south of the terminus of NY 383.

== Arts and culture ==
The First Baptist Church of Mumford and First Presbyterian Church of Mumford are listed on the National Register of Historic Places.

The Genesee Country Village & Museum contains a model historic village preserving local architecture, a nature center, model gardens, and sporting art and carriage museums.
