= National Register of Historic Places listings in Livingston County, New York =

Location of Livingston County in New York

List of the National Register of Historic Places listings in Livingston County, New York

This is intended to be a complete list of properties and districts listed on the National Register of Historic Places in Livingston County, New York. The locations of National Register properties and districts (at least for all showing latitude and longitude coordinates below) may be seen in a map by clicking on "Map of all coordinates". One historic district, the Main Street Historic District (Geneseo, New York), is further designated a National Historic Landmark.

This National Park Service list is complete through NPS recent listings posted April 24, 2026.

Contents: Counties in New York
Albany (Albany) – Allegany – Bronx – Broome – Cattaraugus – Cayuga – Chautauqua – Chemung – Chenango – Clinton – Columbia – Cortland – Delaware – Dutchess (Poughkeepsie, Rhinebeck) – Erie (Buffalo) – Essex – Franklin – Fulton – Genesee – Greene – Hamilton – Herkimer – Jefferson – Kings – Lewis – Livingston – Madison – Monroe (Rochester) – Montgomery – Nassau – New York (Below 14th Street, 14th to 59th Streets, 59th to 110th Streets, Above 110th Street, Islands) – Niagara (Niagara Falls) – Oneida – Onondaga (Syracuse) – Ontario – Orange – Orleans – Oswego – Otsego – Putnam – Queens – Rensselaer – Richmond – Rockland – St. Lawrence – Saratoga – Schenectady – Schoharie – Schuyler – Seneca – Steuben – Suffolk – Sullivan – Tioga – Tompkins – Ulster – Warren – Washington – Wayne – Westchester (Northern, Southern, New Rochelle, Peekskill, Yonkers) – Wyoming – Yates

== Listings county-wide ==
	Name on the Register	Image	Date listed	Location	City or town	Description
1	Alverson-Copeland House	Alverson-Copeland House	August 31, 1989 (#89001133)	1612 Rochester St. 42°54′52″N 77°37′00″W	Lima	
2	Avon Five Arch Bridge	Avon Five Arch Bridge	January 4, 2012 (#11001001)	2078 Avon Geneseo Rd. 42°53′55″N 77°45′50″W	Avon	
3	Avon Inn	Avon Inn	April 16, 1991 (#91000423)	55 E. Main St. 42°54′41″N 77°44′37″W	Avon	
4	Avon Village Historic District		April 28, 2022 (#100007683)	Portions of East and West Main, Genesee, Prospect, Oak, Temple, Clinton, Cemetery, Doer, and Railroad Sts.; Fisk and Park Pls., Wadsworth Ave. 42°54′37″N 77°44′52″W	Avon	
5	Aaron Barber Memorial Building	Aaron Barber Memorial Building	January 23, 2008 (#07001452)	143 Genesee St. 42°54′35″N 77°44′52″W	Avon	
6	Barber-Mulligan Farm	Barber-Mulligan Farm	May 19, 1980 (#80002647)	NE of Avon at 5403 Barber Rd. 42°56′11″N 77°42′44″W	Avon	
7	Barnard Cobblestone House	Barnard Cobblestone House	August 31, 1989 (#89001122)	7192 W. Main St. 42°54′12″N 77°37′03″W	Lima	
8	Black and White Farm Barn	Black and White Farm Barn	February 8, 1988 (#88000031)	7420 Dansville-Mt. Morris Rd., NY 36; 42°39′58″N 77°48′30″W	Sonyea	
9	Boyd & Parker Park and Groveland Ambuscade	Boyd & Parker Park and Groveland Ambuscade	October 1, 2009 (#07000757)	US 20A; Gray Hill Road; 42°46′34″N 77°51′40″W	Groveland	
10	Bristol House	Bristol House	August 31, 1989 (#89001135)	1950 Lake Ave. 42°54′11″N 77°36′45″W	Lima	
11	Caledonia Fish Hatchery	Caledonia Fish Hatchery	February 27, 2015 (#12000310)	16 North St. 42°59′11″N 77°51′42″W	Caledonia	Oldest fish hatchery in the Western Hemisphere; still in use by state.
12	Caledonia House Hotel	Caledonia House Hotel	September 13, 2001 (#01000997)	3141 State St. 42°58′23″N 77°51′11″W	Caledonia	
13	Caledonia Library	Caledonia Library	December 14, 2007 (#07001256)	3108 W. Main St. 42°58′22″N 77°51′15″W	Caledonia	
14	Cargill House	Cargill House	August 31, 1989 (#89001126)	1839 Rochester St. 42°54′27″N 77°36′42″W	Lima	
15	Clark Farm Complex	Clark Farm Complex	August 31, 1989 (#89001125)	7646 E. Main Rd. 42°54′13″N 77°35′37″W	Lima	
16	Clark-Keith House	Clark-Keith House	August 28, 1998 (#98001114)	3092 Main St. 42°58′22″N 77°51′37″W	Caledonia	
17	Claud No. 1 Archeological Site	Claud No. 1 Archeological Site	August 19, 1975 (#75001195)	Address Restricted	Groveland	
18	Conesus Amusement Hall	Conesus Amusement Hall	June 10, 2005 (#05000567)	6210 S. Livonia Rd. 42°43′15″N 77°40′35″W	Conesus	
19	Corby Farm Complex		April 1, 2008 (#08000273)	7400 Corby Road; 42°56′00″N 77°36′19″W	Honeoye Falls	
20	Coverdale Cobblestone House	Coverdale Cobblestone House	September 7, 2005 (#05000989)	2049 Coverdale Rd. 42°47′05″N 77°55′57″W	Leicester	
21	Dansville Downtown Historic District	Dansville Downtown Historic District	June 1, 2007 (#07000485)	Main St., Ossian St. 42°33′39″N 77°41′46″W	Dansville	
22	Dansville Library	Dansville Library	September 14, 1977 (#77000947)	200 Main St. 42°33′44″N 77°41′49″W	Dansville	
23	Dayton House	Dayton House	August 31, 1989 (#89001131)	7180 W. Main St. 42°54′12″N 77°37′05″W	Lima	
24	Delaware, Lackawanna & Western Railroad Station	Delaware, Lackawanna & Western Railroad Station	December 7, 2005 (#05001390)	South Park Dr. 42°46′17″N 77°53′52″W	Leicester	
25	William DePuy House	William DePuy House	August 31, 1989 (#89001127)	1825 Genesee St. 42°54′27″N 77°36′50″W	Lima	
26	Draper House	Draper House	August 31, 1989 (#89001140)	1764 Rochester St. 42°54′35″N 77°36′44″W	Lima	
27	Edgerley	Edgerley	July 16, 1980 (#80002649)	S of Oakland at 9303 Creek Rd. 42°34′29″N 77°58′22″W	Oakland	
28	Elmwood	Elmwood	February 24, 2015 (#15000030)	19 N. Walnut St. 42°34′56″N 77°56′07″W	Nunda	1855 Italianate house is rare well-preserved work in that style by Rochester architect Andrew Jackson Warner
29	Engleside	Engleside	March 23, 2009 (#09000156)	9086 McNair Road; 42°35′07″N 77°44′37″W	Dansville	
30	English Evangelical Lutheran Church of Dansville	English Evangelical Lutheran Church of Dansville	June 25, 2013 (#13000448)	21 Clara Barton St. 42°33′31″N 77°41′52″W	Dansville	American Red Cross founded here by Clara Barton
31	First Methodist Episcopal Church of Avon	First Methodist Episcopal Church of Avon	March 15, 2005 (#05000165)	130 Genesee St. 42°54′36″N 77°44′47″W	Avon	
32	First Presbyterian Church of Avon	First Presbyterian Church of Avon	January 5, 2005 (#04001444)	5605 Avon-Lima Rd. 42°54′35″N 77°42′24″W	East Avon	
33	First Presbyterian Church of Tuscarora	First Presbyterian Church of Tuscarora	January 14, 2004 (#03001400)	8082 Main St. 42°38′03″N 77°52′12″W	Tuscarora	
34	G.A.R. Memorial Hall	G.A.R. Memorial Hall	September 28, 2006 (#06000888)	Main St. 42°32′48″N 77°59′33″W	Hunt	
35	Ganoung Cobblestone Farmhouse	Ganoung Cobblestone Farmhouse	August 31, 1989 (#89001120)	2798 Popular Hill Rd. 42°51′47″N 77°39′41″W	Lima	
36	Elias H. Geiger House	Elias H. Geiger House	April 12, 2006 (#06000267)	10693 Geiger Rd. 42°35′59″N 77°43′52″W	Dansville	
37	Genesee Wesleyan Seminary and Genesee College Hall	Genesee Wesleyan Seminary and Genesee College Hall	July 19, 1976 (#76001227)	College St. 42°54′32″N 77°36′53″W	Lima	
38	Godfrey House and Barn Complex	Godfrey House and Barn Complex	August 31, 1989 (#89001134)	1325 Rochester Rd. 42°55′41″N 77°36′42″W	Lima	
39	Hall's Opera Block	Hall's Opera Block	September 29, 2006 (#06000884)	15-19 Genesee St. 42°54′42″N 77°44′48″W	Avon	
40	Harden House	Harden House	August 31, 1989 (#89001142)	7343 E. Main St. 42°54′19″N 77°36′38″W	Lima	
41	William Harmon House	William Harmon House	August 31, 1989 (#89001130)	1847 Genesee St. 42°54′24″N 77°36′50″W	Lima	
42	William Hartman Farmstead	William Hartman Farmstead	April 14, 2000 (#00000381)	9296 NY 63 N 42°34′37″N 77°42′45″W	Dansville	
43	Hemlock Fairground	Hemlock Fairground	April 6, 2000 (#00000347)	East Ave. 42°47′37″N 77°36′40″W	Hemlock	
44	Hillcrest	Hillcrest	May 6, 1980 (#80002648)	7242 W. Main St. 42°54′14″N 77°36′53″W	Lima	
45	The Homestead	The Homestead	August 30, 1974 (#74001254)	NY 39 and U.S. 20A; 42°47′26″N 77°49′06″W	Geneseo	
46	House at No. 13 Grove Street	House at No. 13 Grove Street	January 7, 1999 (#98001582)	13 Grove St. 42°43′41″N 77°52′37″W	Mount Morris	
47	House at No. 176 South Main Street	House at No. 176 South Main Street	January 7, 1999 (#98001581)	176 S. Main St. 42°43′08″N 77°52′16″W	Mount Morris	
48	House at No. 30 Murray Street	House at No. 30 Murray Street	January 7, 1999 (#98001585)	30 Murray St. 42°43′22″N 77°52′32″W	Mount Morris	
49	House at No. 48 Grove Street	House at No. 48 Grove Street	January 7, 1999 (#98001583)	48 Grove St. 42°43′39″N 77°52′54″W	Mount Morris	
50	House at No. 8 State Street	House at No. 8 State Street	January 7, 1999 (#98001580)	8 State St. 42°43′33″N 77°52′24″W	Mount Morris	
51	Kellerman Log Cabin	Kellerman Log Cabin	February 1, 2006 (#05001615)	6074 S. Livonia Rd. 42°43′35″N 77°40′30″W	Conesus	
52	J. Francis Kellogg House	J. Francis Kellogg House	June 5, 2003 (#03000511)	255 Genesee St. 42°54′22″N 77°44′55″W	Avon	
53	R. P. Kemp No. 1 Site	R. P. Kemp No. 1 Site	August 22, 1977 (#77000950)	Address Restricted	West Sparta	
54	Leech-Lloyd Farmhouse and Barn Complex	Leech-Lloyd Farmhouse and Barn Complex	August 31, 1989 (#89001117)	1589 and 1601 York St. 42°55′00″N 77°35′31″W	Lima	
55	Leech-Parker Farmhouse	Leech-Parker Farmhouse	August 31, 1989 (#89001116)	1537 York St. 42°55′09″N 77°35′30″W	Lima	
56	Lima Village Historic District	Lima Village Historic District	November 20, 1987 (#87002042)	1881-1885 & 1818-1870 Rochester St., Lima Presbyterian Church, 7304-7312 & 7303-7315 E. Main St. 42°54′19″N 77°36′44″W	Lima	
57	Linwood	Linwood	December 15, 1997 (#97001493)	1912 York Rd. 42°51′59″N 77°56′16″W	York	
58	Livonia Baptist Church	Livonia Baptist Church	March 25, 1977 (#77000949)	9 High St. 42°49′13″N 77°39′57″W	Livonia	
59	Main Street Historic District	Main Street Historic District	July 9, 1977 (#77000948)	Main St. from the courthouse at Court and North Sts. 42°47′46″N 77°49′02″W	Geneseo	Known also as Geneseo Historic District
60	Markham Cobblestone Farmhouse and Barn Complex	Markham Cobblestone Farmhouse and Barn Complex	August 31, 1989 (#89001119)	6857 Heath-Markham Rd. 42°55′56″N 77°38′11″W	Lima	
61	Martin Farm Complex	Martin Farm Complex	August 31, 1989 (#89001136)	1301 Bragg St. 42°55′50″N 77°34′36″W	Lima	
62	Gen. William A. Mills House	Gen. William A. Mills House	December 19, 1978 (#78001858)	14 Main St. 42°43′36″N 77°52′31″W	Mount Morris	
63	Morgan Cobblestone Farmhouse	Morgan Cobblestone Farmhouse	August 31, 1989 (#89001118)	6870 W. Main Rd. 42°54′06″N 77°37′55″W	Lima	
64	Ogilvie Moses Farmhouse	Ogilvie Moses Farmhouse	August 31, 1989 (#89001123)	2150 Clay St. 42°53′37″N 77°35′52″W	Lima	
65	Zebulon Moses Farm Complex	Zebulon Moses Farm Complex	August 31, 1989 (#89001132)	2770 Clay Rd. 42°51′56″N 77°35′32″W	Lima	
66	Murray Street Historic District	Murray Street Historic District	March 1, 1996 (#96000178)	33-47 and 32-46 Murray St. 42°43′18″N 77°54′05″W	Mount Morris	
67	National Hotel	National Hotel	December 6, 2004 (#04001344)	2927 Main St. 42°46′40″N 77°52′18″W	Cuylerville	
68	New Family Theater	New Family Theater	August 1, 1997 (#97000846)	102 Main St. 42°43′27″N 77°52′26″W	Mount Morris	
69	North Bloomfield School		May 28, 1981 (#81000409)	7840 Martin Rd. 42°56′15″N 77°34′43″W	North Bloomfield	
70	Nunda Village Historic District		February 3, 2025 (#100011419)	Buffalo St, Center St, East St, Fair St, First St, Fourth St, Gibbs St, Holmes St, Massachusetts St, Mill St, North Church St, North State St, Portage St, Price St, Second St, Seward St, South Church St, South State St, Vermont St, West St; 42°34′46″N 77°56′34″W	Nunda	
71	Payne Cobblestone House	Payne Cobblestone House	November 1, 2006 (#06000969)	5813 Federal Rd. 42°44′11″N 77°39′51″W	Conesus	
72	J. Franklin Peck House	J. Franklin Peck House	August 31, 1989 (#89001128)	7347 E. Main St. 42°54′20″N 77°36′36″W	Lima	
73	Thomas Peck Farmhouse	Thomas Peck Farmhouse	August 31, 1989 (#89001137)	7955 E. Main Rd. 42°54′34″N 77°34′21″W	Lima	
74	Pioneer Farm	Pioneer Farm	December 18, 1970 (#70000422)	S of Dansville on NY 36; 42°33′04″N 77°42′04″W	Dansville	
75	St. John's Episcopal Church	St. John's Episcopal Church	July 19, 1991 (#91000892)	Jct. of State and Stanley Sts. 42°43′28″N 77°52′36″W	Mount Morris	
76	St. Rose Roman Catholic Church Complex	St. Rose Roman Catholic Church Complex	August 25, 1988 (#88001345)	Lake Ave. 42°54′06″N 77°36′41″W	Lima	
77	School No. 6	School No. 6	August 31, 1989 (#89001121)	6679 Jenks Rd. 42°52′36″N 77°38′44″W	Lima	
78	Sliker Cobblestone House	Sliker Cobblestone House	January 25, 2007 (#06001300)	6050 Sliker Rd. 42°42′51″N 77°41′28″W	Conesus	
79	South Main Street Historic District	South Main Street Historic District	March 1, 1996 (#96000177)	123-159 and 124-158 S. Main St. 42°43′18″N 77°52′18″W	Mount Morris	
80	Sparta First Presbyterian Church	Sparta First Presbyterian Church	January 23, 2007 (#06001209)	4687 Scottsburg Rd. 42°39′53″N 77°45′59″W	Groveland Station	
81	Spencer House	Spencer House	August 31, 1989 (#89001124)	7372 E. Main St. 42°54′20″N 77°36′31″W	Lima	
82	Stanley House	Stanley House	August 31, 1989 (#89001129)	7364 E. Main St. 42°54′20″N 77°36′33″W	Lima	
83	State and Eagle Streets Historic District	State and Eagle Streets Historic District	March 1, 1996 (#96000179)	16-34 and 15-39 State St. and 6-12 Eagle St. 42°43′28″N 77°52′42″W	Mount Morris	
84	Sweet Briar	Sweet Briar	March 29, 2010 (#10000104)	5126 Mount Morris Rd. 42°46′29″N 77°49′41″W	Geneseo	
85	Union Block	Union Block	February 10, 2000 (#00000092)	38-42 State St. 42°34′52″N 77°56′34″W	Nunda	
86	US Post Office-Dansville	US Post Office-Dansville	November 17, 1988 (#88002476)	100 Main St. 42°33′35″N 77°41′40″W	Dansville	
87	William L. Vary House	William L. Vary House	August 31, 1989 (#89001141)	7378 E. Main St. 42°54′21″N 77°36′30″W	Lima	
88	Wadsworth Fort Site	Wadsworth Fort Site	June 11, 1975 (#75001194)	Address Restricted	Geneseo	
89	Asahel Warner House	Asahel Warner House	August 31, 1989 (#89001139)	7136 W. Main St. 42°54′09″N 77°37′15″W	Lima	
90	Matthew Warner House	Matthew Warner House	August 31, 1989 (#89001138)	7449 E. Main St. 42°54′30″N 77°36′15″W	Lima	
91	Westerly	Westerly	December 19, 1974 (#74001255)	Chandler Rd. 42°49′14″N 77°51′16″W	Piffard	
92	Williamsburg Cemetery	Williamsburg Cemetery	November 14, 2002 (#02001328)	Abel Rd. 42°44′54″N 77°49′55″W	Hampton Corners	

== See also ==
- National Register of Historic Places listings in New York
