= Lima (village), New York =

Lima, New York
- Village
- Location within New York Location within the United States
- Coordinates: 42°54′23″N 77°36′46″W
- Country: United States
- State: New York
- County: Livingston
- Town: Lima

Area
  - Total: 1.34 sq mi (3.48 km^{2})
  - Land: 1.34 sq mi (3.48 km^{2})
  - Water: 0 sq mi (0.00 km^{2})
- Elevation: 827 ft (252 m)

Population (2020)
  - Total: 2,094
  - Density: 1,556.4/sq mi (600.94/km^{2})
- Time zone: UTC-5 (Eastern (EST))
  - Summer (DST): UTC-4 (EDT)
- ZIP code: 14485
- Area code: 585
- FIPS code: 36-42323
- GNIS feature ID: 2390941
- Website: www.villageoflimany.gov

Lima is a village in the town of Lima, Livingston County, New York, United States. The population of Lima village was 2,139 at the 2010 census, out of 4,305 in the entire town.

== History ==
The village was founded in 1788 by Paul Davison and Jonathan Gould, veterans of the Sullivan Campaign, who had seen the area during the American Revolution. The village of Lima was organized in 1797 as the "Village of Charleston", but in 1808 the name was changed to "Lima", after Old Lyme, Connecticut. (For that reason, the name of the village is currently pronounced like the name of the bean, not like the name of the city in Peru).

The Genesee Wesleyan Seminary (1830) / Genesee College (1849) was one of the first co-educational schools in the country when it opened in 1822. Eventually, determined by a Methodist-Episcopal convention in 1870, the college was shut in favor of the newly developed Syracuse University (1871), over the protests of the residents of Lima.

=== Notable people ===
- Kenneth Keating, U.S. representative, senator, and ambassador to Israel
- Belva Ann Lockwood, first female attorney to practice before the Supreme Court
- James Edward Quigley, former archbishop of Chicago
- Henry Jarvis Raymond, founder of the New York Times
- W. W. Thayer, former governor of Oregon

=== National Register of Historic Places ===
The following sites are listed on the National Register of Historic Places.

	Name on the Register	Image	Date listed	Location	City or town	Description
1	Alverson-Copeland House		August 31, 1989 (#89001133)	1612 Rochester St. 42°54′52″N 77°37′00″W	Lima	
2	Barnard Cobblestone House	Barnard Cobblestone House	August 31, 1989 (#89001122)	7192 W. Main St. 42°54′12″N 77°37′03″W	Lima	
3	Bristol House	Bristol House	August 31, 1989 (#89001135)	1950 Lake Ave. 42°54′11″N 77°36′45″W	Lima	
4	Cargill House		August 31, 1989 (#89001126)	1839 Rochester St. 42°54′27″N 77°36′42″W	Lima	
5	Clark Farm Complex		August 31, 1989 (#89001125)	7646 E. Main Rd. 42°54′13″N 77°35′37″W	Lima	
6	Dayton House		August 31, 1989 (#89001131)	7180 W. Main St. 42°54′12″N 77°37′05″W	Lima	
7	William DePuy House		August 31, 1989 (#89001127)	1825 Genesee St. 42°54′27″N 77°36′50″W	Lima	
8	Draper House		August 31, 1989 (#89001140)	1764 Rochester St. 42°54′35″N 77°36′44″W	Lima	
9	Genesee Wesleyan Seminary and Genesee College Hall	Genesee Wesleyan Seminary and Genesee College Hall	July 19, 1976 (#76001227)	College St. 42°54′32″N 77°36′53″W	Lima	
10	Harden House		August 31, 1989 (#89001142)	7343 E. Main St. 42°54′19″N 77°36′38″W	Lima	
11	William Harmon House		August 31, 1989 (#89001130)	1847 Genesee St. 42°54′24″N 77°36′50″W	Lima	
12	Hillcrest	Hillcrest	May 6, 1980 (#80002648)	7242 W. Main St. 42°54′14″N 77°36′53″W	Lima	
13	Morgan Cobblestone Farmhouse	Morgan Cobblestone Farmhouse	August 31, 1989 (#89001118)	6870 W. Main Rd. 42°54′06″N 77°37′55″W	Lima	
14	J. Franklin Peck House	J. Franklin Peck House	August 31, 1989 (#89001128)	7347 E. Main St. 42°54′20″N 77°36′36″W	Lima	
15	St. Rose Roman Catholic Church Complex		August 25, 1988 (#88001345)	Lake Ave. 42°54′06″N 77°36′41″W	Lima	
16	School No. 6	School No. 6	August 31, 1989 (#89001121)	6679 Jenks Rd. 42°52′36″N 77°38′44″W	Lima	
17	Spencer House		August 31, 1989 (#89001124)	7372 E. Main St. 42°54′20″N 77°36′31″W	Lima	
18	Stanley House		August 31, 1989 (#89001129)	7364 E. Main St. 42°54′20″N 77°36′33″W	Lima	
19	William L. Vary House		August 31, 1989 (#89001141)	7378 E. Main St. 42°54′21″N 77°36′30″W	Lima	
20	Asahel Warner House		August 31, 1989 (#89001139)	7136 W. Main St. 42°54′09″N 77°37′15″W	Lima	
21	Matthew Warner House	Matthew Warner House	August 31, 1989 (#89001138)	7449 E. Main St. 42°54′30″N 77°36′15″W	Lima	

== Geography ==
Lima is located near the northeastern corner of Livingston County at 42°54′23″N 77°36′46″W (42.906511, -77.612808), at the center of the town of Lima. It is at the intersection of conjoined New York State Route 5/U.S. Route 20 (in part, Avon Lima Road and East Main Street) and New York State Route 15A (in part Rochester Road and Plank Road). The village is 4 miles (6 km) east of Interstate 390, 15 miles (24 km) northeast of Geneseo, the Livingston county seat, and 19 miles (31 km) south of Rochester.

According to the United States Census Bureau, the village has a total area of 1.4 square miles (3.5 km^{2}), all land. The eastern boundary of the village is formed by Spring Brook, a northward-flowing tributary of Honeoye Creek and part of the Genesee River watershed.

== Demographics ==
Historical population
Census	Pop.	Note	%±
1870	1,257		—
1880	1,878		49.4%
1890	1,003		−46.6%
1900	949		−5.4%
1910	866		−8.7%
1920	843		−2.7%
1930	897		6.4%
1940	942		5.0%
1950	1,147		21.8%
1960	1,366		19.1%
1970	1,686		23.4%
1980	2,025		20.1%
1990	2,165		6.9%
2000	2,459		13.6%
2010	2,139		−13.0%
2020	2,094		−2.1%
U.S. Decennial Census

As of the census of 2000, there were 2,459 people, 770 households, and 532 families. The population density was 1,783.4 inhabitants per square mile (688.6/km^{2}). There were 800 housing units at an average density of 580.2 per square mile (224.0/km^{2}). The racial makeup of the village was 95.65% White, 1.46% Black or African American, 0.41% Native American, 0.73% Asian, 0.12% Pacific Islander, 0.49% from other races, and 1.14% from two or more races. Hispanic or Latino of any race were 1.71% of the population.

There were 770 households, out of which 36.6% had children under the age of 18 living with them, 55.3% were married couples living together, 10.0% had a female householder with no husband present, and 30.8% were non-families. 25.6% of all households were made up of individuals, and 9.9% had someone living alone who was 65 years of age or older. The average household size was 2.59 and the average family size was 3.15.

In the village, the population was spread out, with 22.6% under the age of 18, 19.0% from 18 to 24, 29.4% from 25 to 44, 20.7% from 45 to 64, and 8.3% who were 65 years of age or older. The median age was 32 years. For every 100 females, there were 95.0 males. For every 100 females age 18 and over, there were 93.9 males.

The median income for a household in the village was $41,646, and the median income for a family was $52,102. Males had a median income of $29,966 versus $25,429 for females. The per capita income for the village was $15,622. 5.3% of the population and 3.4% of families were below the poverty line. 3.4% of those under the age of 18 and 6.6% of those 65 and older are all living below the poverty line.
