= Warner House =

Warner House may refer to:

== Places in the United States ==
(by state then city or town)

- P. C. Warner First House, Florence, Arizona, listed on the National Register of Historic Places (NRHP) in Pinal County, Arizona
- Solomon Warner House and Mill, Tucson, Arizona, listed on the NRHP in Pima County, Arizona
- Capt. John T. Warner House, Batesville, Arkansas, listed on the NRHP in Independence County, Arkansas
- Jonathan Warner House, Chester, Connecticut, also known as Warner-Brooks House, NRHP-listed
- Warner House (East Haddam, Connecticut), NRHP-listed
- Warner's Ranch, Warner Springs, California, NRHP-listed
- J. W. Warner House, Miami, Florida, NRHP-listed
- Peabody-Warner House, Columbus, Georgia, listed on the NRHP in Muscogee County, Georgia
- Seth Warner House, Chicago, Illinois, listed on the NRHP in West Side Chicago
- Warner Apartment Building, Davenport, Iowa, listed on the NRHP in Scott County, Iowa
- Davis-Warner House, Takoma Park, Maryland, NRHP-listed
- Timothy and Lucretia Jones Warner Homestead, Brighton, Michigan, listed on the NRHP in Livingston County, Michigan
- Maj. William Warner House, Kansas City, Missouri, listed on the NRHP in Jackson County, Missouri
- Warner-Cather House, Red Cloud, Nebraska, listed on the NRHP in Webster County, Nebraska
- Warner's Filling Station and House, Geneva, Nebraska, listed on the NRHP in Fillmore County, Nebraska
- MacPheadris–Warner House, Portsmouth, New Hampshire, known also as Warner House, a U.S. National Historic Landmark
- Bute-Warner-Truax Farm, Charlotteville, New York, NRHP-listed
- Oliver Warner Farmstead, Clifton Springs, New York, NRHP-listed
- Asahel Warner House, Lima, New York, NRHP-listed
- Matthew Warner House, Lima, New York, NRHP-listed
- Vassar-Warner Row, Poughkeepsie, New York, NRHP-listed
- H. H. Warner Building, Rochester, New York, NRHP-listed
- Samuel Adams Warner House, Roslyn, New York, NRHP-listed
- Isaiah Warner Farmstead, Wrightstown Township, Pennsylvania, listed on the NRHP in Bucks County, Pennsylvania
- Orlando W. Warner House, Moab, Utah, listed on the NRHP in Grand County, Utah
- Andrew J. Warner House, Ogden, Utah, listed on the NRHP in Weber County, Utah
- Warner Home, St. Albans, Vermont, listed on the NRHP in Franklin County, Vermont
- Warner Hall, Gloucester, Virginia, listed on the NRHP in Gloucester County, Virginia
- Anson Warner Farmstead, Whitewater, Wisconsin, listed on the NRHP in Walworth County, Wisconsin

== See also ==
- Warner Theater (disambiguation)
- Warner Valley Ranger Station, Chester, California, NRHP-listed
