= William Harmon House =

William Harmon House may refer to:

- William Harmon House (Miles City, Montana), listed on the National Register of Historic Places in Montana
- William Harmon House (Lima, New York), listed on the National Register of Historic Places in New York
