= School Number 6 =

School Number 6 may refer to:

- School Number 6 (Davenport, Iowa), listed on the National Register of Historic Places in Scott County, Iowa
- Jotham W. Wakeman Public School Number 6, Jersey City, New Jersey
- School No. 6, listed on the National Register of Historic Places in Livingston County, New York
- Park County School District Number 6, based in Cody, Wyoming
- Uinta County School District Number 6, based in Lyman, Wyoming
- Fremont County School District Number 6, based in Pavillion, Wyoming
