= Harden House =

Historic house in New York, United States

- U.S. National Register of Historic Places
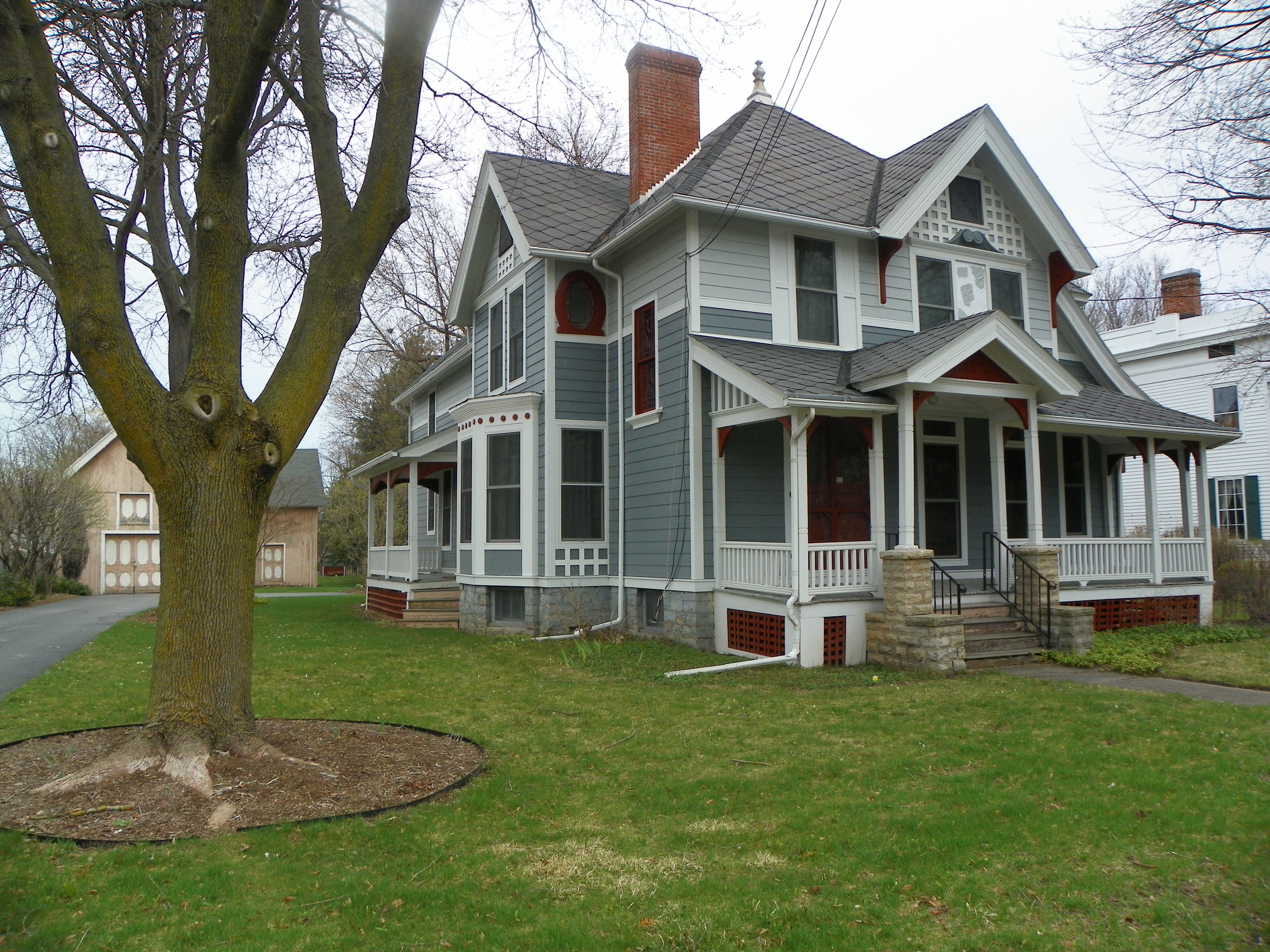

- Location within New York Location within the United States
- Location: 7343 E. Main St., Lima, New York
- Coordinates: 42°54′19″N 77°36′38″W
- Area: 0.8 acres (0.32 ha)
- Built: 1885
- Architect: Pierce Brothers
- Architectural style: Queen Anne
- MPS: Lima MRA
- NRHP reference No.: 89001142
- Added to NRHP: August 31, 1989

Harden House is a historic home located at Lima in Livingston County, New York. It was built about 1885 and is a two-story frame dwelling in the Queen Anne style. Also on the property is a 19th-century carriage house.

It was listed on the National Register of Historic Places in 1989.
