= J. Franklin Peck House =

Historic house in New York, United States

- U.S. National Register of Historic Places
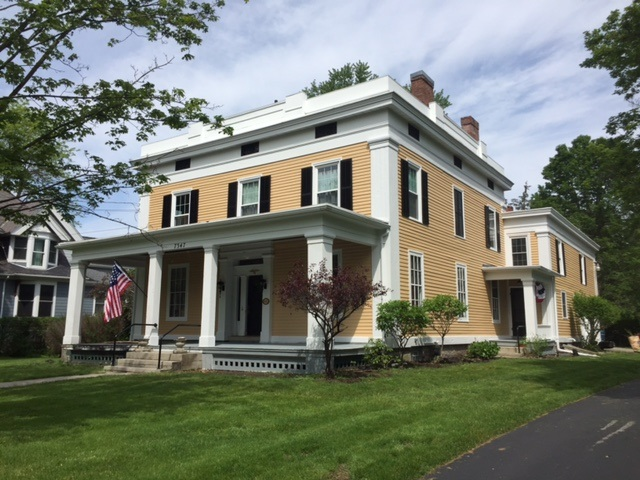
- J. Franklin Peck House

- Location within New York Location within the United States
- Location: 7347 E. Main St., Lima, New York
- Coordinates: 42°54′20″N 77°36′36″W
- Area: 1.3 acres (0.53 ha)
- Built: 1853
- Architect: Peck, J. Franklin
- Architectural style: Greek Revival
- MPS: Lima MRA
- NRHP reference No.: 89001128
- Added to NRHP: August 31, 1989

J. Franklin Peck House is a historic home located at Lima in Livingston County, New York. It was built in 1853 and is a 2 1/2-story, three-bay, Greek Revival–style frame dwelling. The main floor consists of a center hallway with four rooms--a formal parlor, a library, a large dining room, and a small parlor. A modern kitchen is located in the back of the first floor. The second story contains four bedrooms in the main house and three additional rooms in the back. The house has ten separate fireplaces, plaster crown moldings and ceiling moldings, and pocket doors.

It was listed on the National Register of Historic Places in 1989.
