= William DePuy House =

Historic house in New York, United States

- U.S. National Register of Historic Places
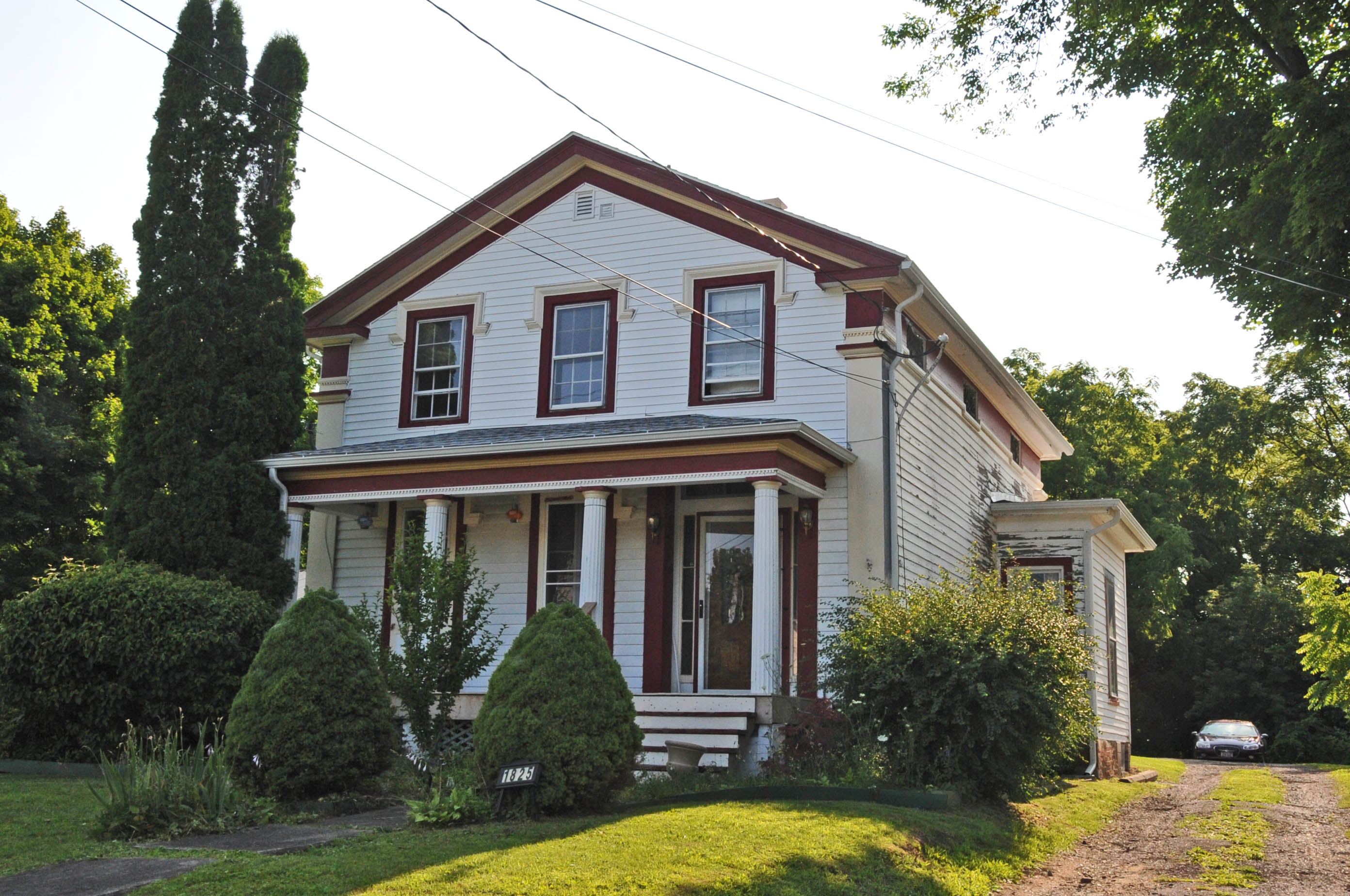

- Location within New York Location within the United States
- Location: 1825 Genesee St., Lima, New York
- Coordinates: 42°54′27″N 77°36′50″W
- Area: less than one acre
- Built: 1851
- Architectural style: Greek Revival, Vernacular Greek Revival
- MPS: Lima MRA
- NRHP reference No.: 89001127
- Added to NRHP: August 31, 1989

William DePuy House is a historic home located at Lima in Livingston County, New York. It was built about 1851 and is a 1 1/2-story frame dwelling with vernacular Greek Revival and Gothic Revival design elements. The front features a 1-story hip-roofed porch supported by Doric columns.

It was listed on the National Register of Historic Places in 1989.
