= Bristol House =

Historic house in New York, United States

- U.S. National Register of Historic Places
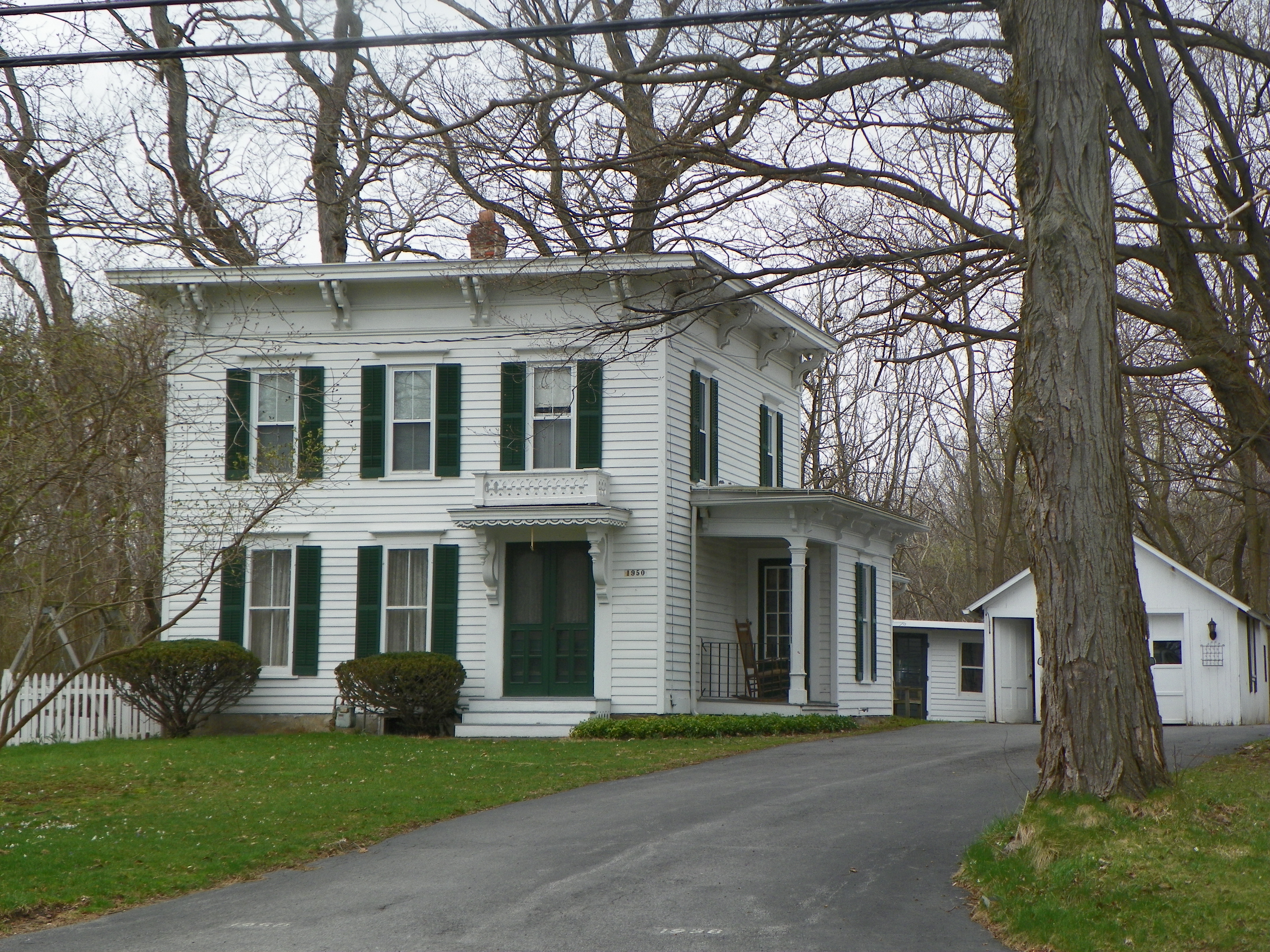

- Location within New York Location within the United States
- Location: 1950 Lake Ave., Lima, New York
- Coordinates: 42°54′11″N 77°36′45″W
- Area: 1.2 acres (0.49 ha)
- Built: 1870
- Architectural style: Italianate
- MPS: Lima MRA
- NRHP reference No.: 89001135
- Added to NRHP: August 31, 1989

Bristol House is a historic home located at Lima in Livingston County, New York. It was built between 1870 and 1875 and is a two-story, three bay wide by two bay deep, Italianate style frame dwelling. The front facade is dominated by the elaborate canopy above the slightly recessed, paneled wooden doors of the side hall entrance.

It was listed on the National Register of Historic Places in 1989.
