= Dayton House =

Historic house in New York, United States

- U.S. National Register of Historic Places
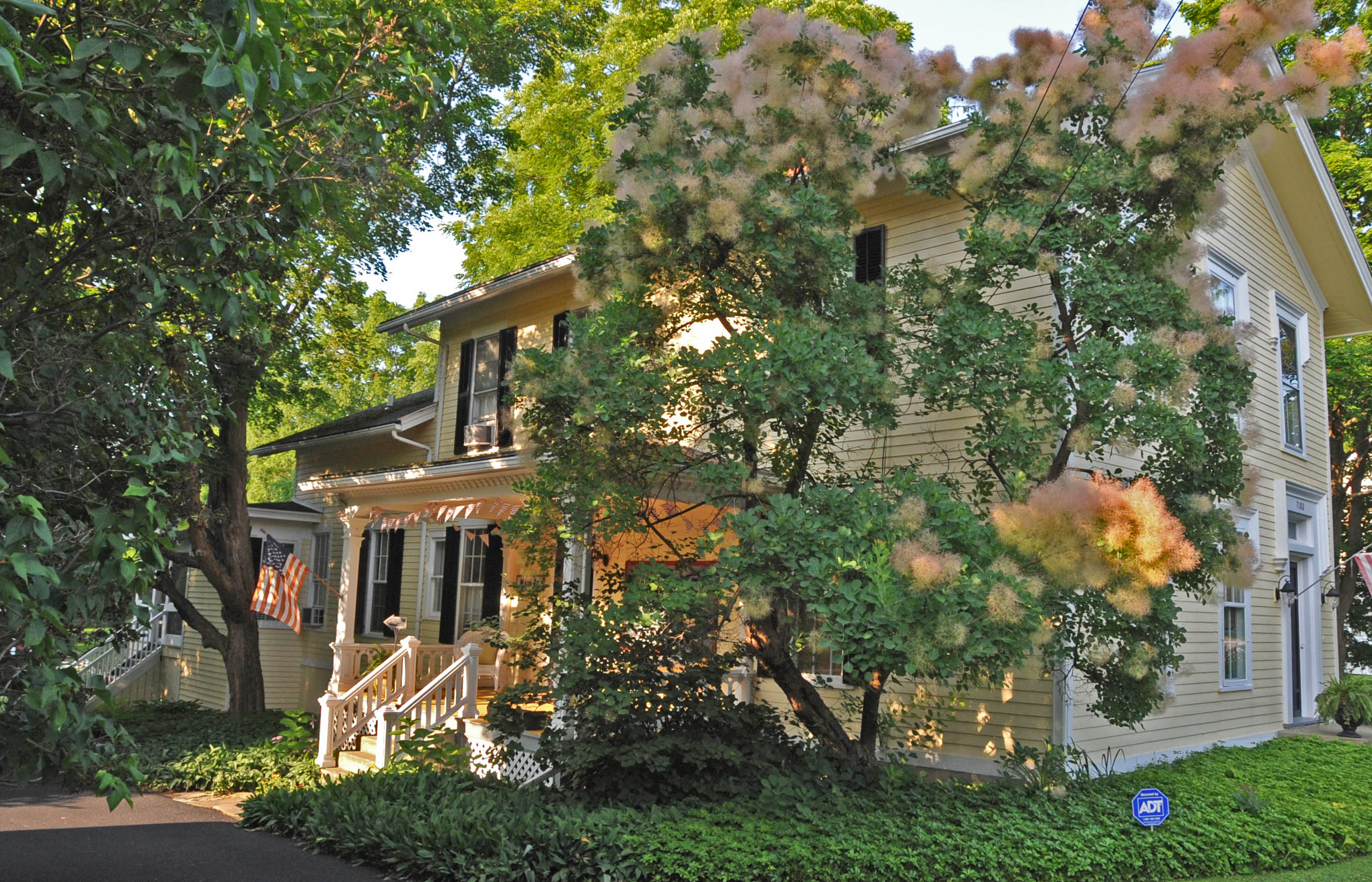

- Location within New York Location within the United States
- Location: 7180 W. Main St., Lima, New York
- Coordinates: 42°54′12″N 77°37′5″W
- Area: 8.9 acres (3.6 ha)
- Built: 1844
- Architect: Dayton, David; Harmon, William
- Architectural style: Greek Revival
- MPS: Lima MRA
- NRHP reference No.: 89001131
- Added to NRHP: August 31, 1989

Dayton House is a historic home located at Lima in Livingston County, New York. It was built about 1844 and expanded and upgraded in the 1850s / 1860s. It is a two-story, three bay dwelling with Greek Revival form and an overlay of Italianate and Gothic Revival design elements. Also on the property is a large carriage house, smoke house, and original cast iron lamp post.

It was listed on the National Register of Historic Places in 1989.
