= Stanley House (Lima, New York) =

Historic house in New York, United States

- U.S. National Register of Historic Places
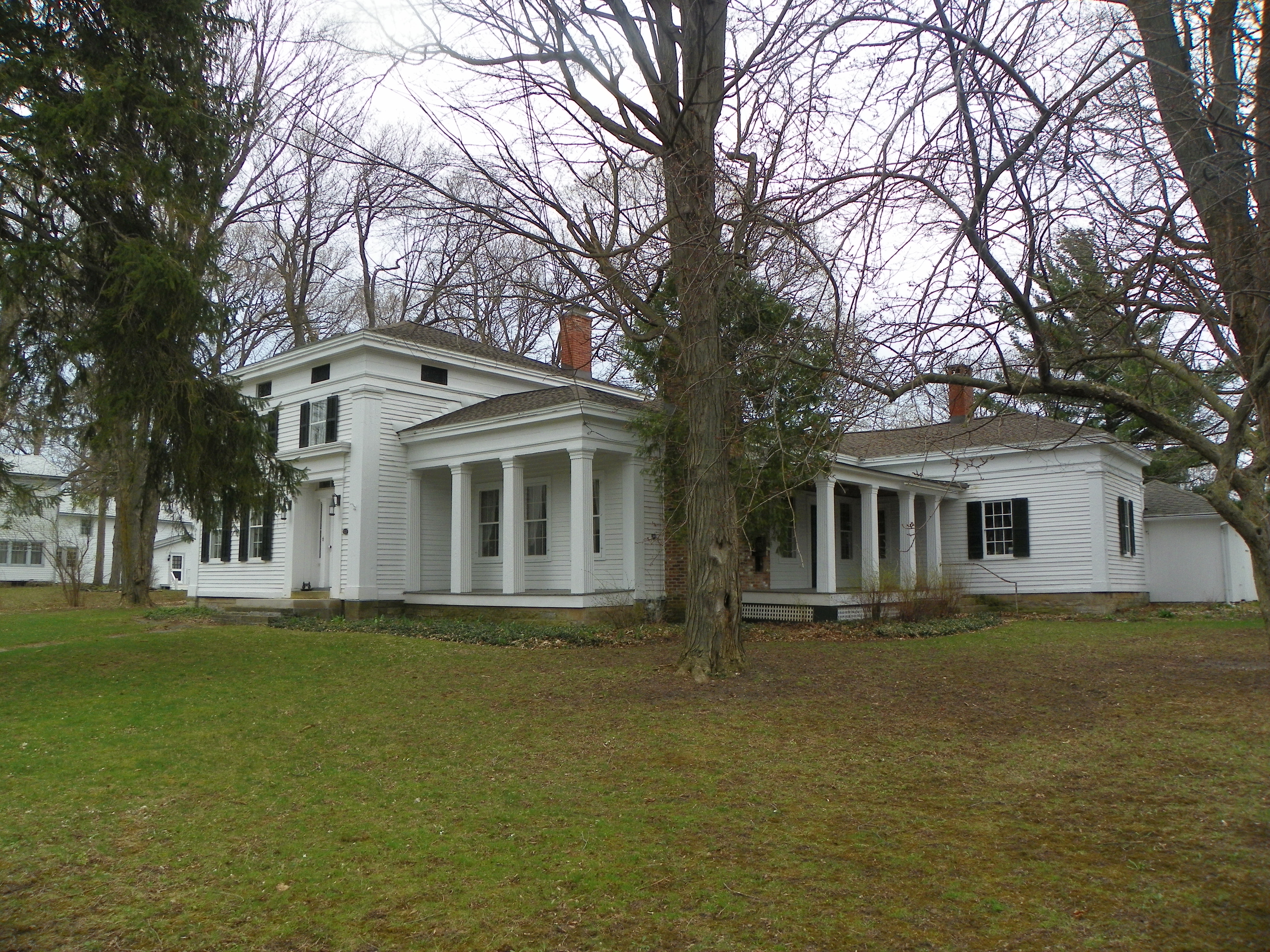

- Location within New York Location within the United States
- Location: 7364 E. Main St., Lima, New York
- Coordinates: 42°54′20″N 77°36′33″W
- Area: 2.5 acres (1.0 ha)
- Built: 1857
- Architect: Backus, Clinton; Stanley, Daniel
- Architectural style: Greek Revival
- MPS: Lima MRA
- NRHP reference No.: 89001129
- Added to NRHP: August 31, 1989

Stanley House is a historic home located at Lima in Livingston County, New York. It was built about 1857 and is a two-story, Greek Revival style frame dwelling with clapboard siding and a rubblestone foundation faced with roughly hewn limestone blocks. Also on the property are a contributing 19th century carriage house and privy.

It was listed on the National Register of Historic Places in 1989.
