= Barnard Cobblestone House =

Historic house in New York, United States

- U.S. National Register of Historic Places
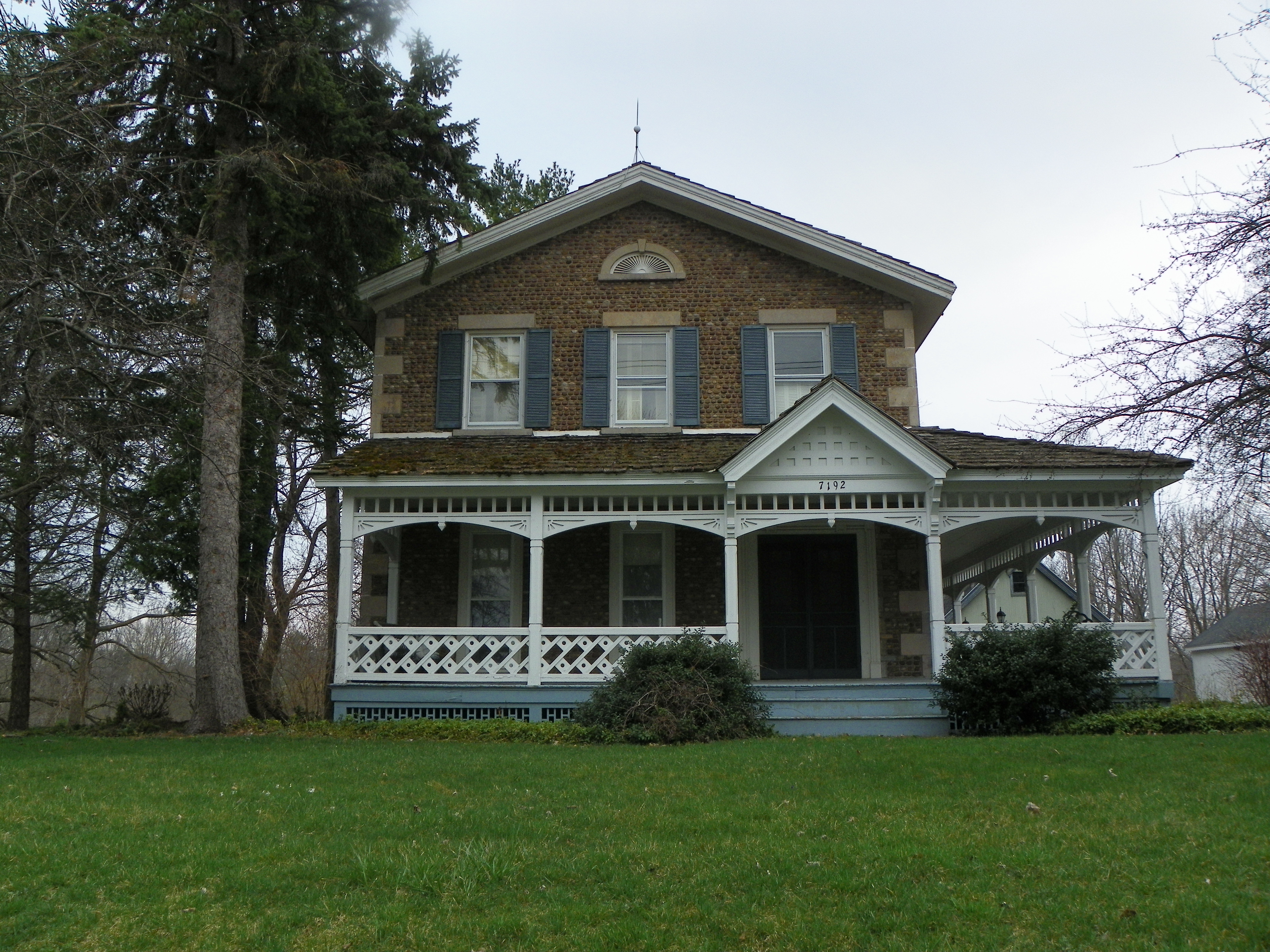

- Location within New York Location within the United States
- Location: 7192 W. Main St., Lima, New York
- Coordinates: 42°54′12″N 77°37′3″W
- Area: 6.4 acres (2.6 ha)
- Architectural style: Greek Revival, Federal
- MPS: Lima MRA
- NRHP reference No.: 89001122
- Added to NRHP: August 31, 1989

Barnard Cobblestone House is a historic home located at Lima in Livingston County, New York. It is a two-story, three-bay side hall cobblestone structure built in the late Federal / early Greek Revival style. A remodeling in the 1880s added Queen Anne style details including the verandah. It features irregularly shaped, variously colored cobbles in its construction, although most are red sandstone. Also on the property is a 19th-century carriage barn.

It was listed on the National Register of Historic Places in 1989.
