= William L. Vary House =

Historic house in New York, United States

- U.S. National Register of Historic Places
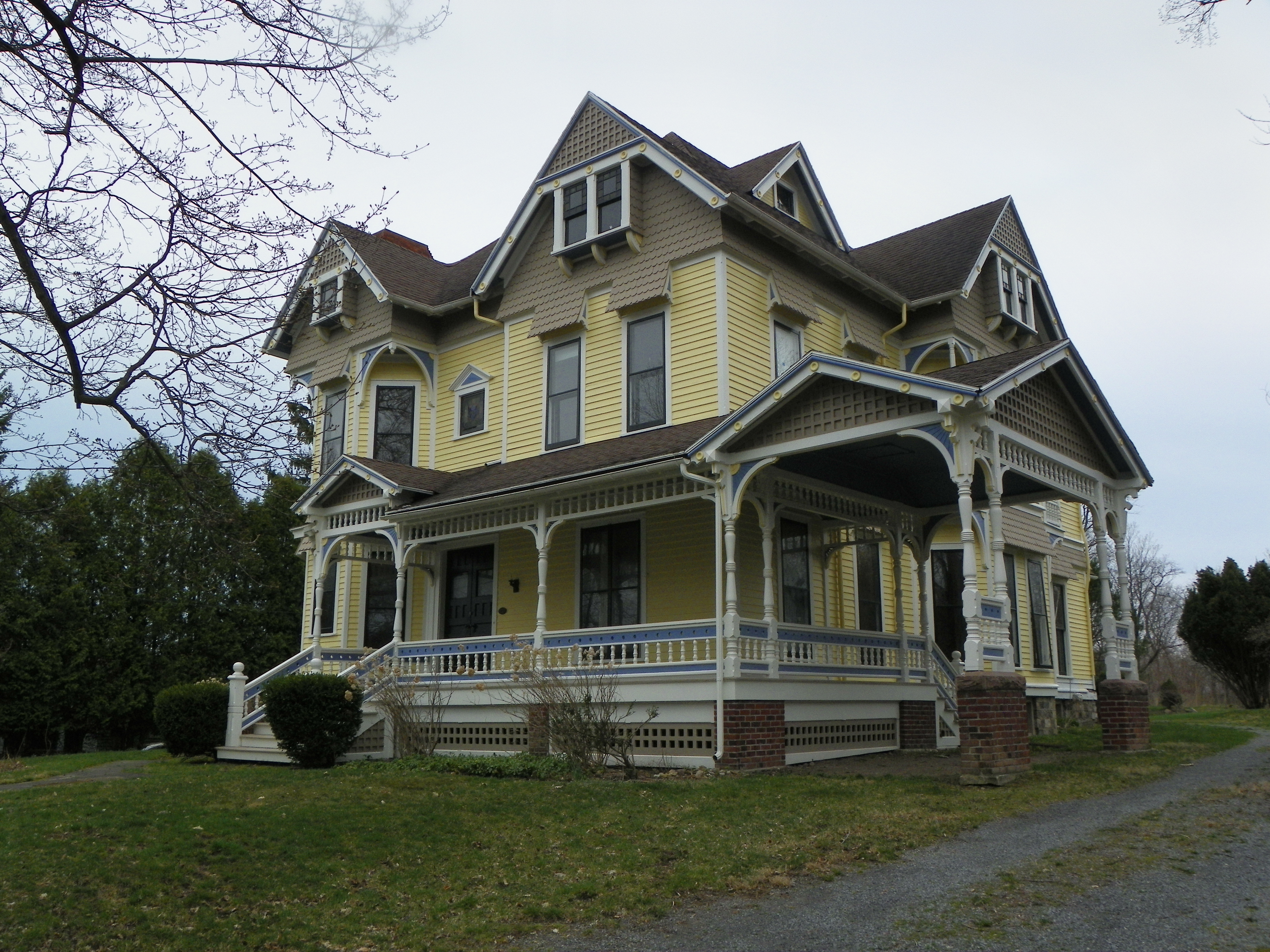

- Location within New York Location within the United States
- Location: 7378 E. Main St., Lima, New York
- Coordinates: 42°54′22.84″N 77°36′27.41″W
- Area: 9.9 acres (4.0 ha)
- Built: 1885
- Architect: Pierce Brothers
- Architectural style: Queen Anne
- MPS: Lima MRA
- NRHP reference No.: 89001141
- Added to NRHP: August 31, 1989

William L. Vary House is a historic home located at Lima in Livingston County, New York. It was built in 1885 and is a 2 1/2-story, Queen Anne–style frame dwelling. The plan consists of an irregular massing of rectangular forms, with a profusion of projecting bays, cross gables, porches, and oriels.

It was listed on the National Register of Historic Places in 1989.

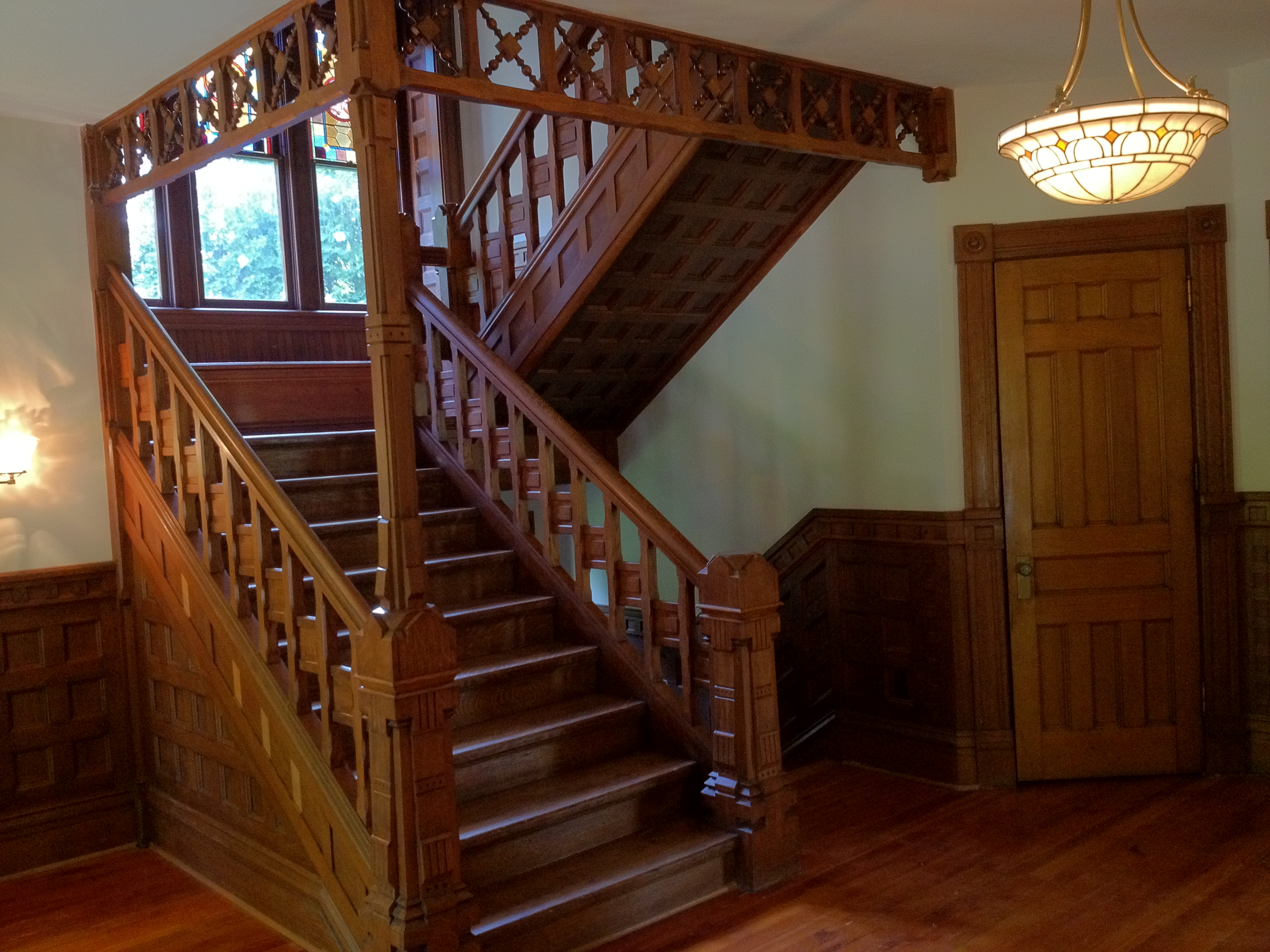
William L. Vary House

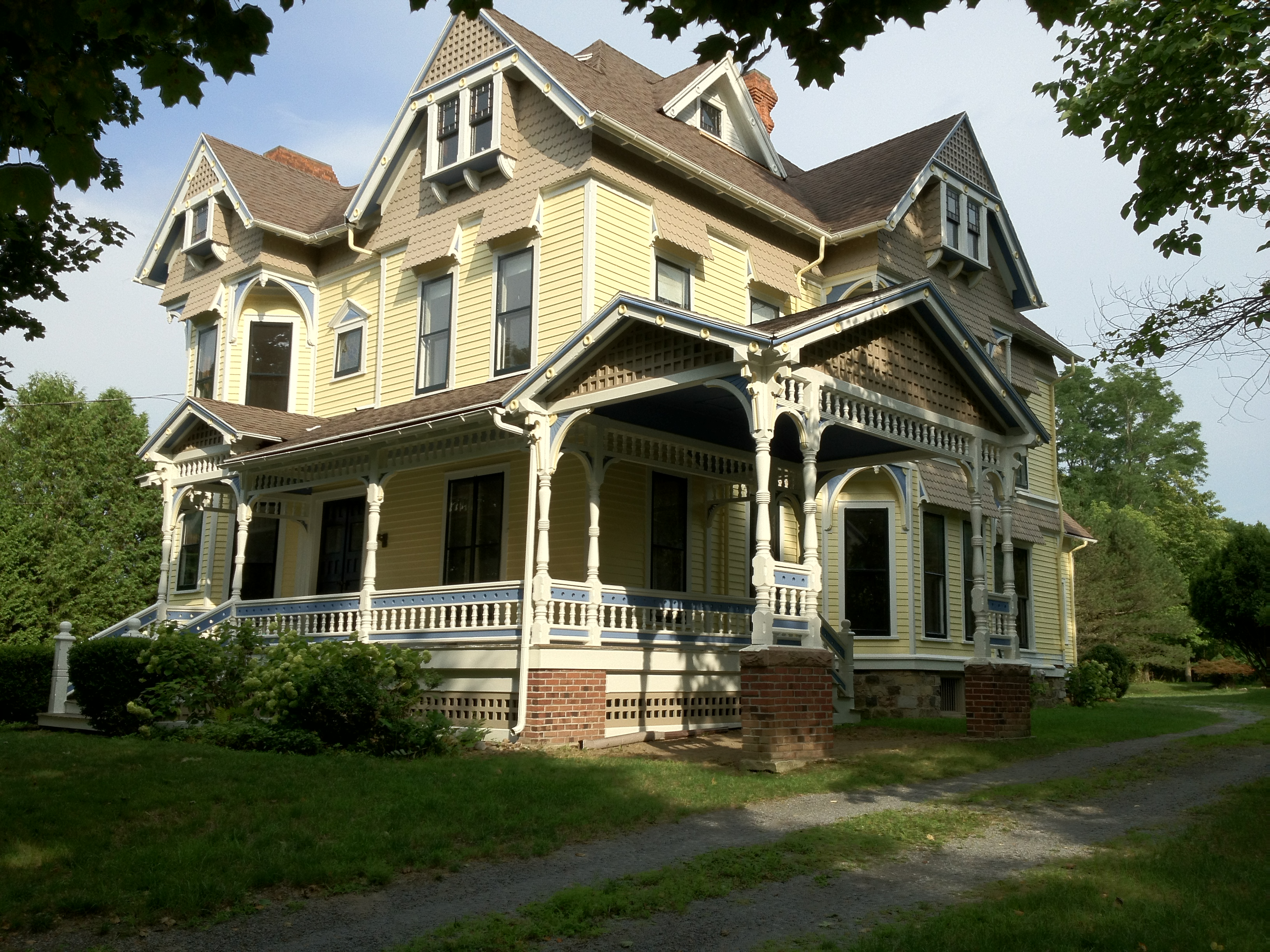
William L. Vary House

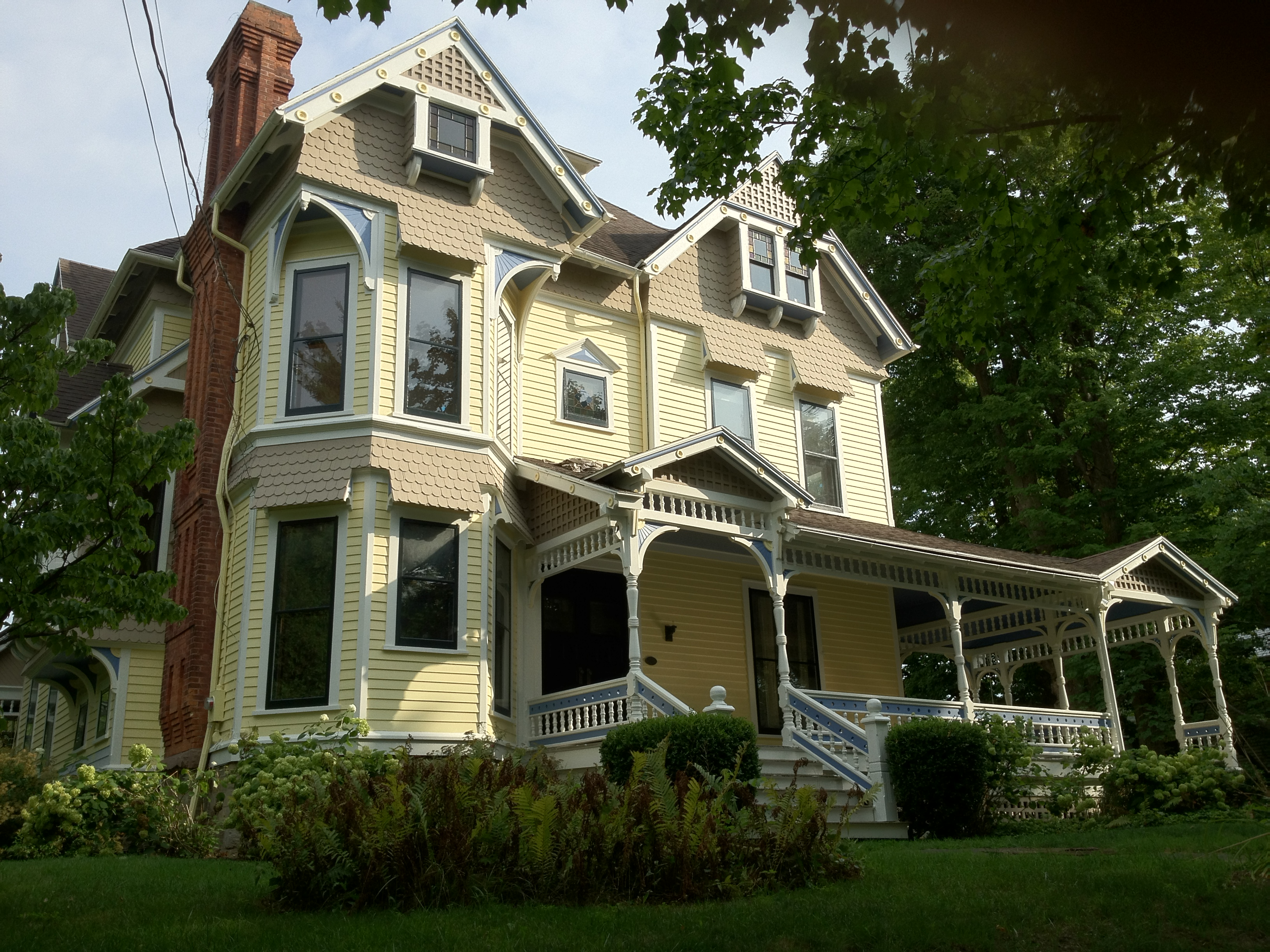
William L. Vary House
