= Hillcrest (Lima, New York) =

Historic house in New York, United States

- U.S. National Register of Historic Places
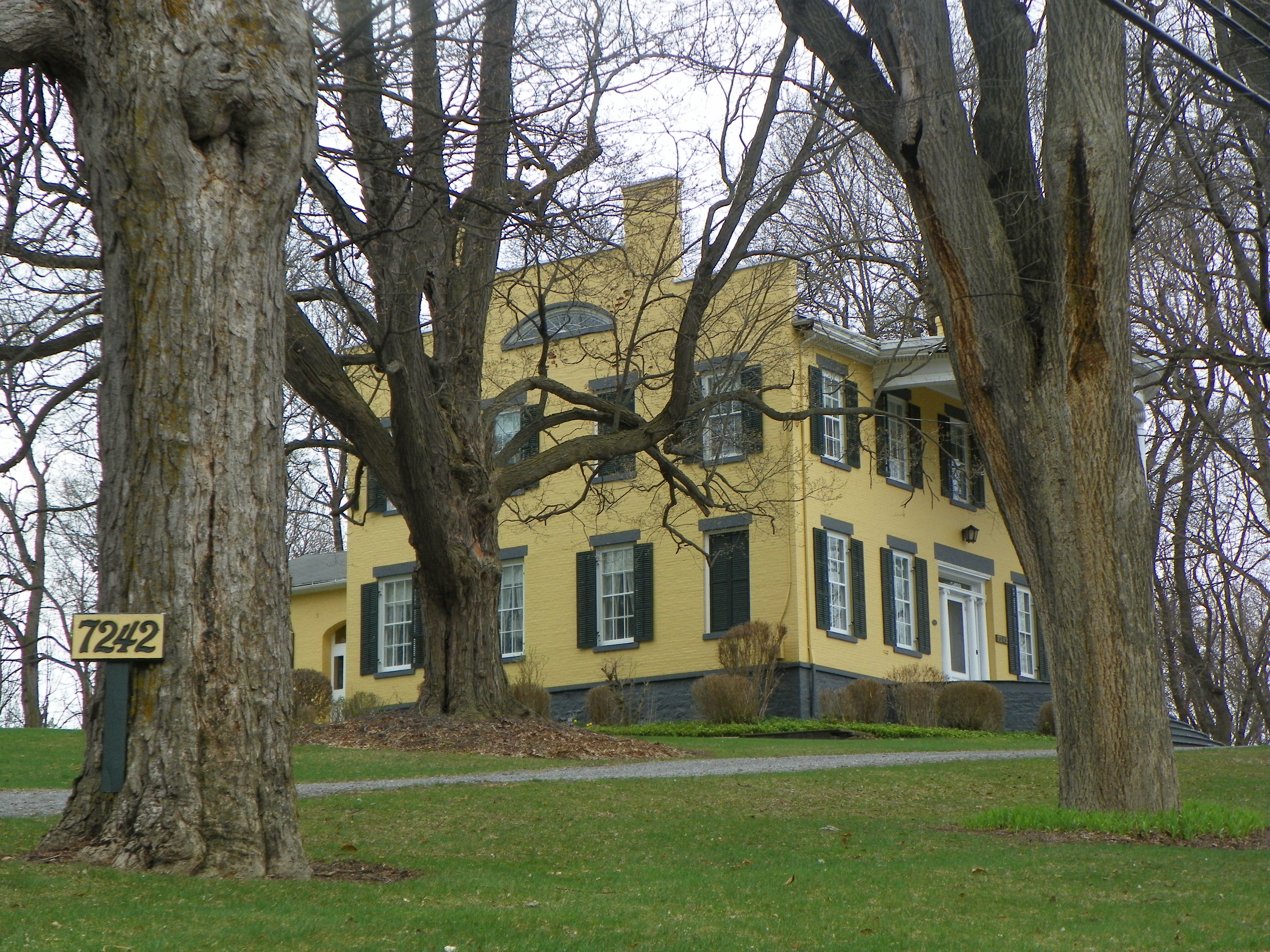

- Location within New York Location within the United States
- Location: 7242 W. Main St., Lima, New York
- Coordinates: 42°54′14″N 77°36′53″W
- Area: 4 acres (1.6 ha)
- Built: 1838
- Architectural style: Federal
- NRHP reference No.: 80002648
- Added to NRHP: May 06, 1980

Hillcrest is a historic home located at Lima in Livingston County, New York. It is a two-story painted brick dwelling constructed in 1838–1840. Stylistically, the house is a combination of Federal and Greek Revival design entrance. In 1902-1903 the semicircular three-bay portico was added to the front entrance. Also on the property is a gazebo constructed from the remains of the privy and carriage barn.

It was listed on the National Register of Historic Places in 1980.
