= Draper House (Lima, New York) =

Historic house in New York, United States

- U.S. National Register of Historic Places
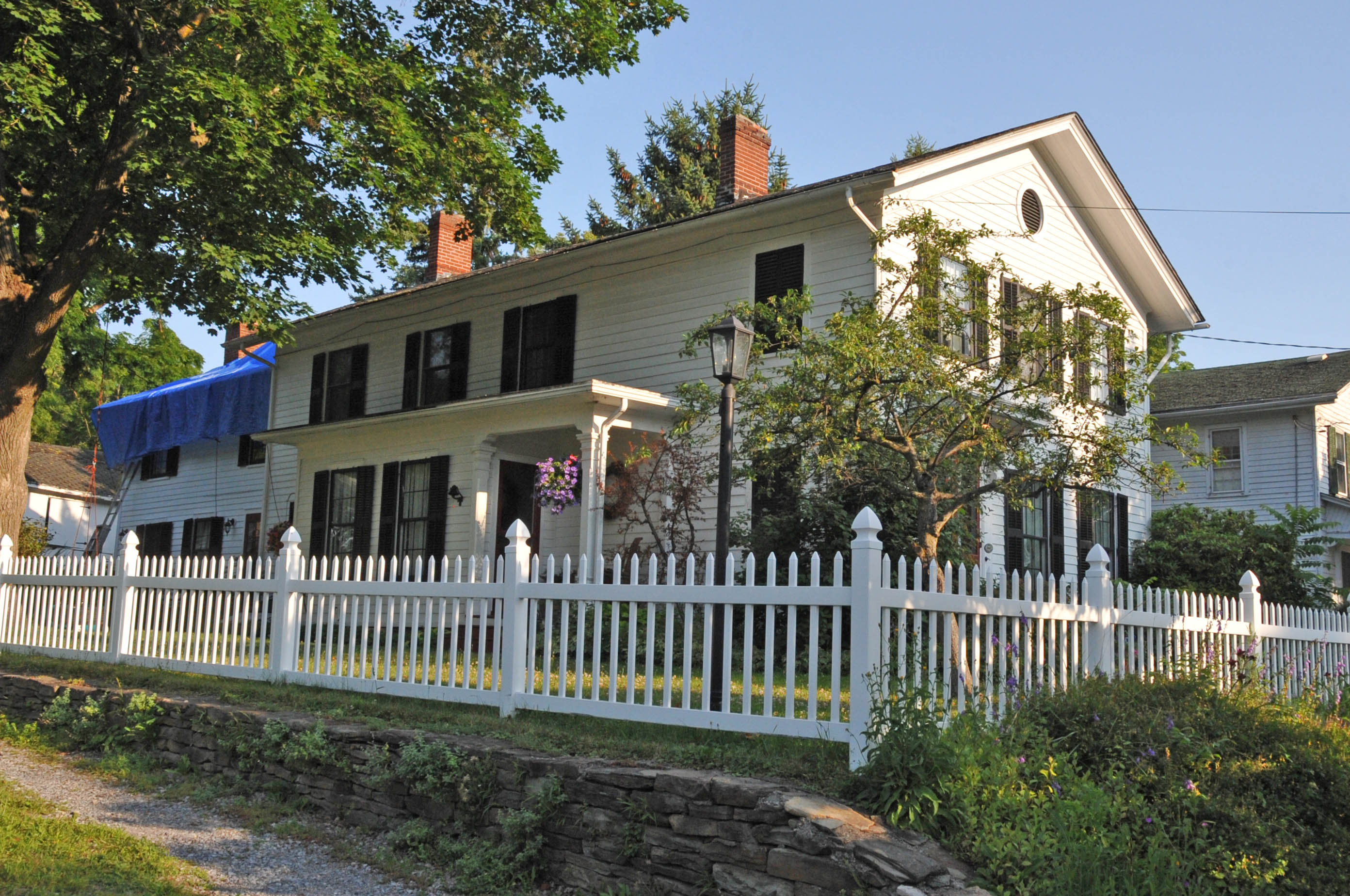

- Location within New York Location within the United States
- Location: 1764 Rochester St., Lima, New York
- Coordinates: 42°54′35″N 77°36′44″W
- Built: 1842
- MPS: Lima MRA
- NRHP reference No.: 89001140
- Added to NRHP: August 31, 1989

Draper House is a historic home located at Lima in Livingston County, New York. It was built about 1842 and remodeled in the 1860s. It is a two-story, three-bay, side hall frame residence with vernacular Italianate style design features.

It was listed on the National Register of Historic Places in 1989.
