= Engleside =

Historic house in New York, United States

- U.S. National Register of Historic Places
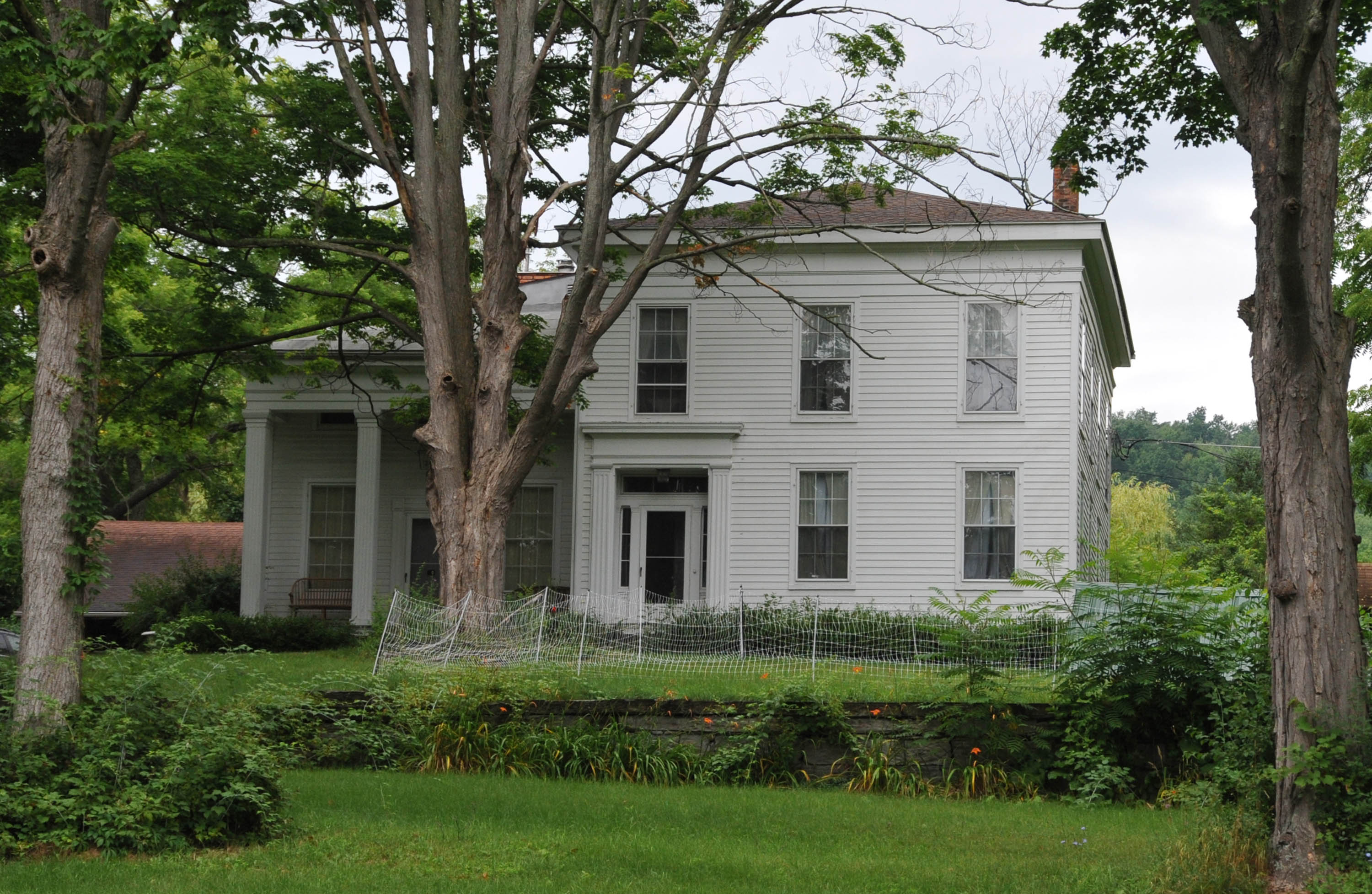

- Location within New York Location within the United States
- Location: 9086 McNair Road, Dansville, New York
- Coordinates: 42°35′7″N 77°44′37″W
- Area: 13.785 acres (5.579 ha)
- Built: ca. 1848
- Architect: McNair, James
- Architectural style: Greek Revival
- NRHP reference No.: 09000156
- Added to NRHP: March 23, 2009

Engleside is a historic estate located near Dansville in Livingston County, New York. The estate includes the large Greek Revival style main house, barn, single bay garage, and a combination laundry / drying house / privy building. The main house was built around 1848. It is composed of a two-story three bay, side hall entrance main block surmounted by a hipped roof with a long wing. The property also features a stone retaining wall with integrated quarter circle flights of steps and a cast iron fountain.

It was listed on the National Register of Historic Places in 2009.
