= St. Rose Roman Catholic Church Complex (Lima, New York) =

Historic church in New York, United States

- U.S. National Register of Historic Places
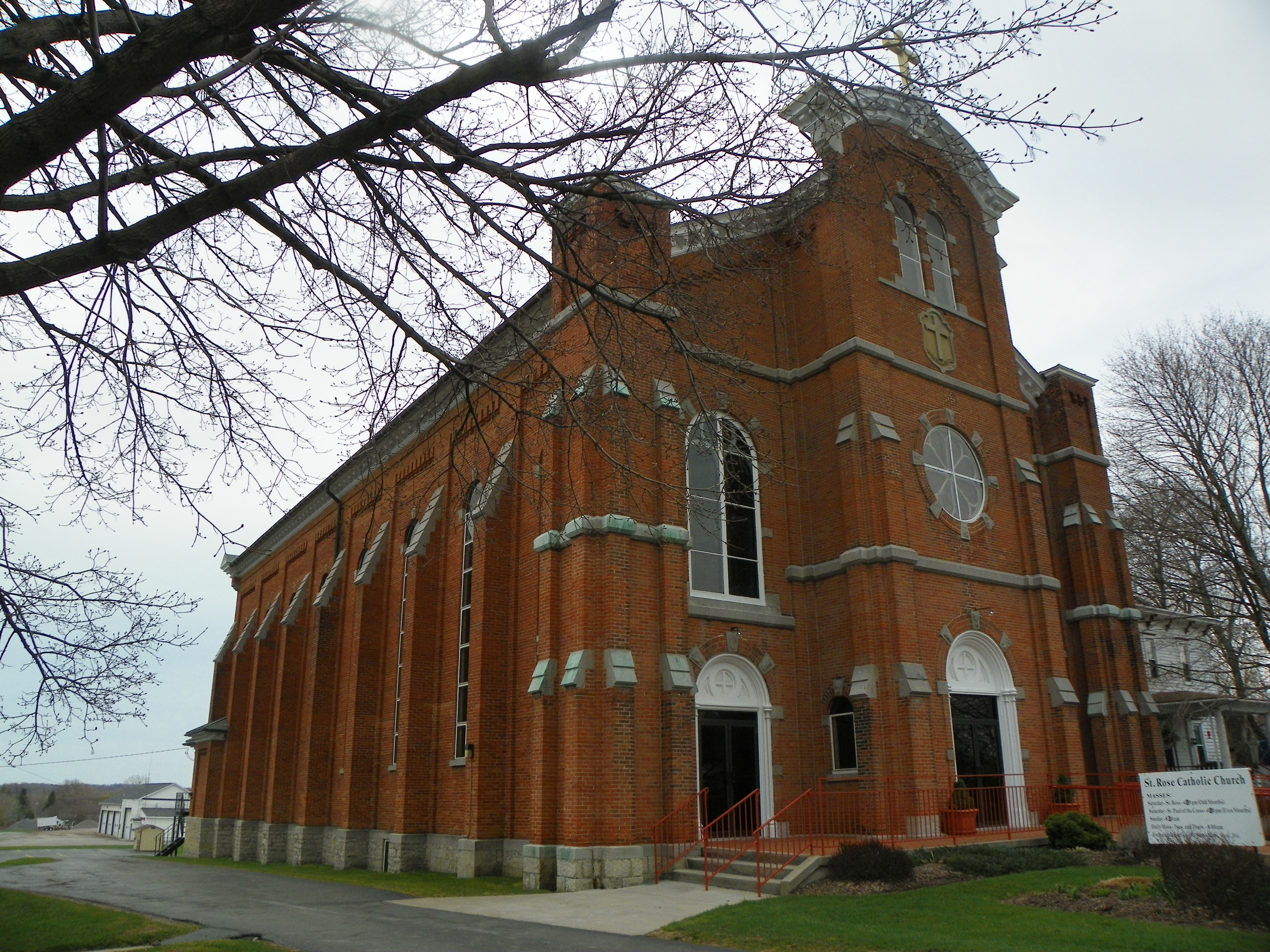

- Location within New York Location within the United States
- Location: Lake Ave., Lima, New York
- Coordinates: 42°54′6″N 77°36′41″W
- Area: 2.2 acres (0.89 ha)
- Built: 18701873
- Architect: Warner, Andrew J.; Porter, R.T.
- Architectural style: Late Victorian, Italianate, Romanesque
- NRHP reference No.: 88001345
- Added to NRHP: August 25, 1988

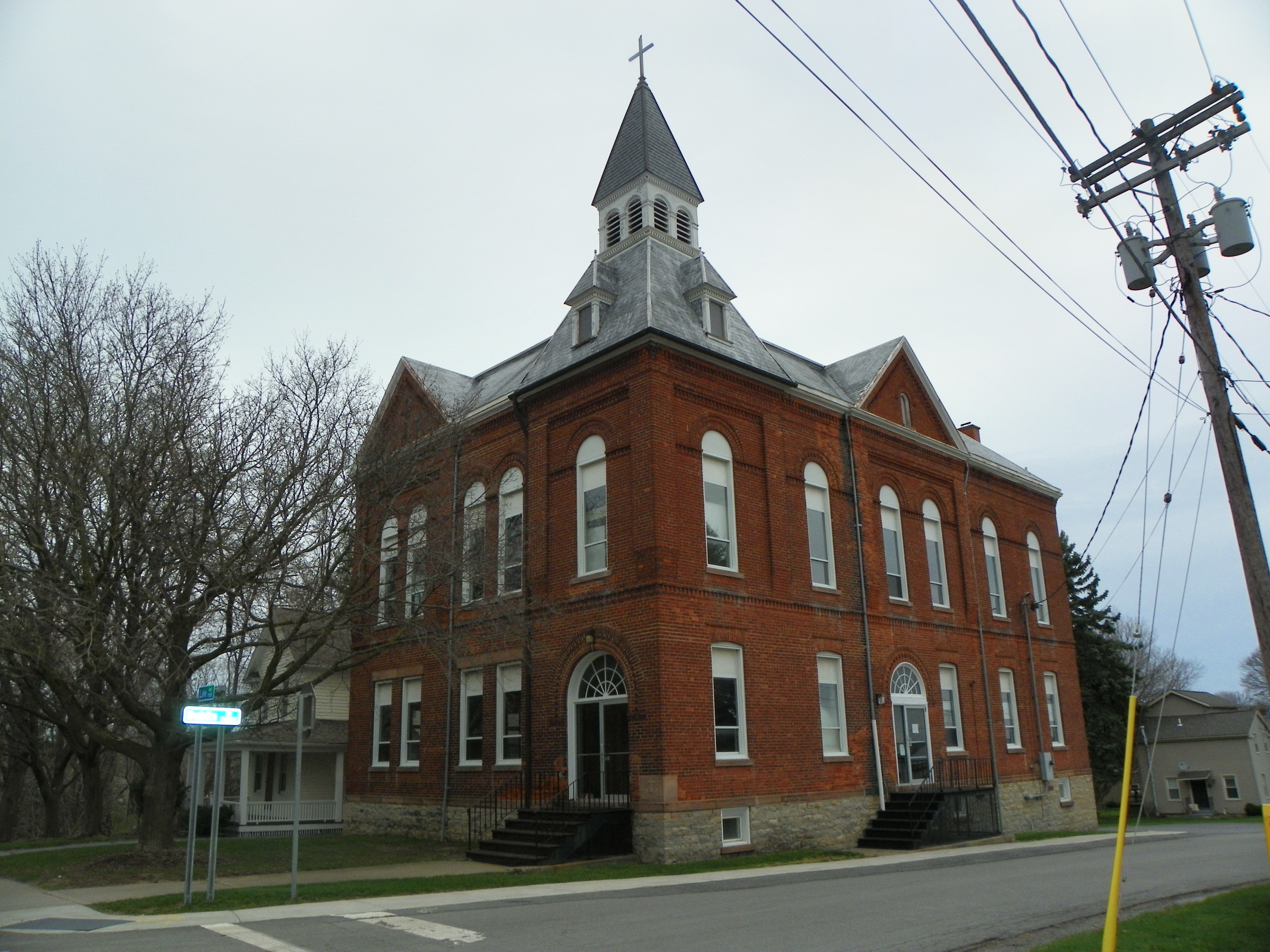
Brendan Hall parochial school

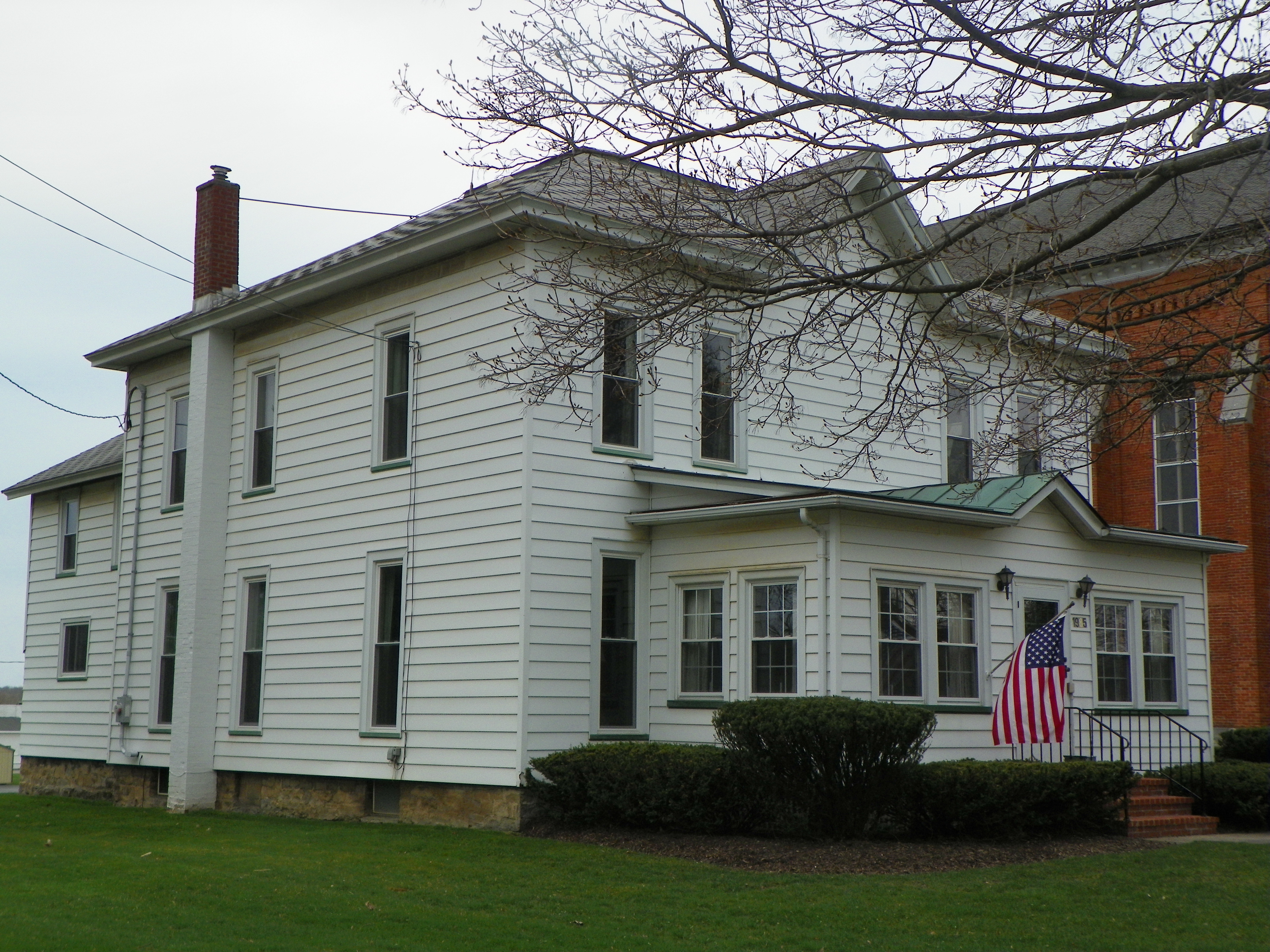
The rectory/parish hall

St. Rose Roman Catholic Church Complex is a Roman Catholic church complex located at Lima in Livingston County, New York. The complex consists of four contributing buildings: 1) St. Rose Church, constructed 1870–1873; 2) Brendan Hall, constructed in 1894 as a parochial school; 3) rectory; and 4) convent.

It was listed on the National Register of Historic Places in 1988.
