= Alverson-Copeland House =

Historic house in New York, United States

- U.S. National Register of Historic Places
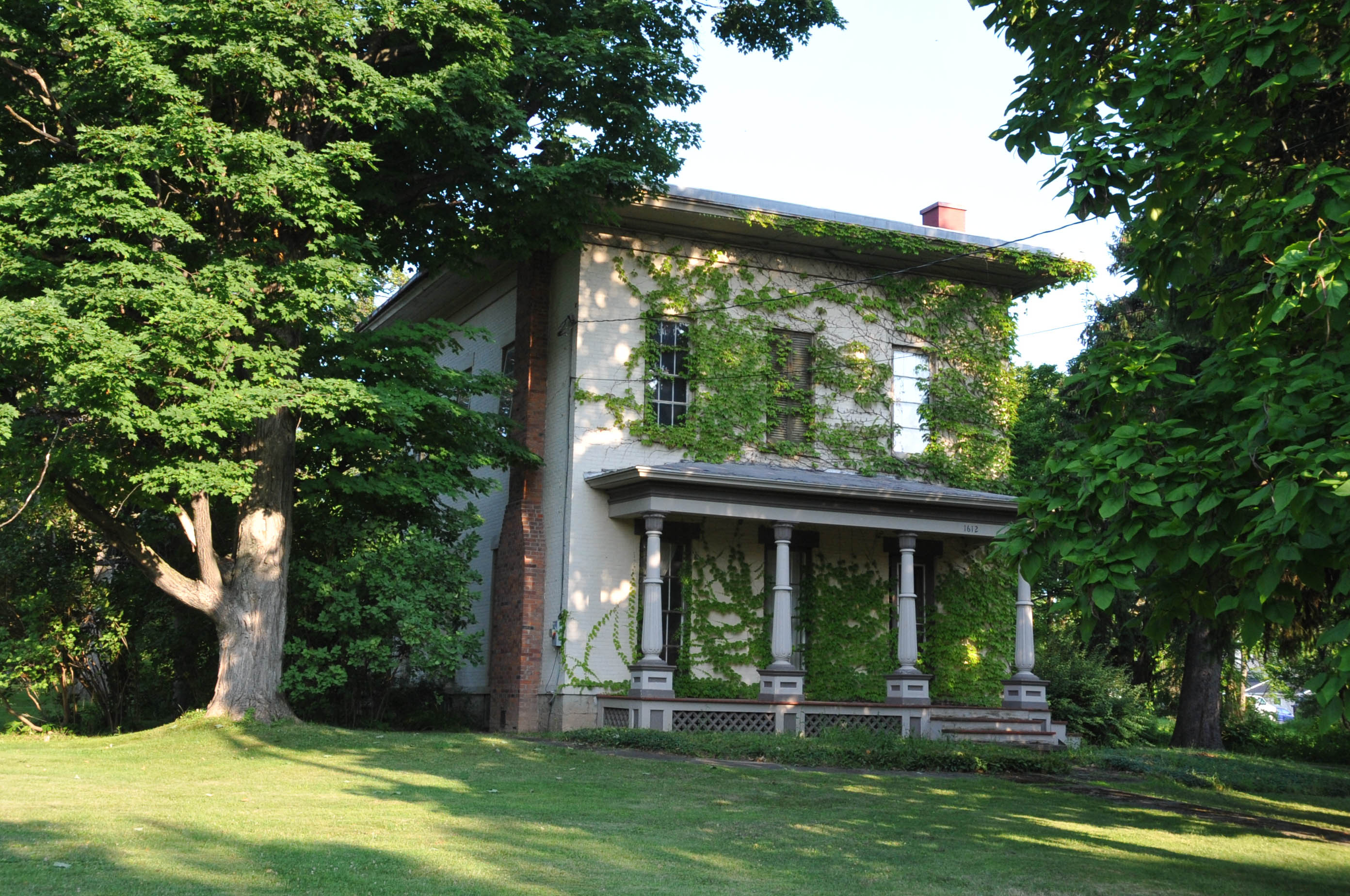

- Location within New York Location within the United States
- Interactive map showing the location of Algerian-Copeland House
- Location: 1612 Rochester St., Lima, New York
- Coordinates: 42°54′52″N 77°36′44″W
- Area: 1.5 acres (0.61 ha)
- Built: 1853
- Architect: Searle, H.; Et al.
- Architectural style: Greek Revival, Italianate
- MPS: Lima MRA
- NRHP reference No.: 89001133
- Added to NRHP: August 31, 1989

The Alverson-Copeland House is a historic house located at 1612 Rochester Street in Lima, Livingston County, New York.

== Description and history ==
It was built in about 1853, and is a two-story, three-bay-wide and three-bay-deep, brick residence with late Greek Revival and early-Italianate-style design and decoration features. A 1 1/2-story brick wing extends from the rear. The house features a one-story, flat-roofed verandah on the front with broadly projecting eaves, full molded entablature, and Egyptian/Moorish Revival inspired support posts.

It was listed on the National Register of Historic Places on August 31, 1989.
