= Cargill House =

Historic house in New York, United States

- U.S. National Register of Historic Places
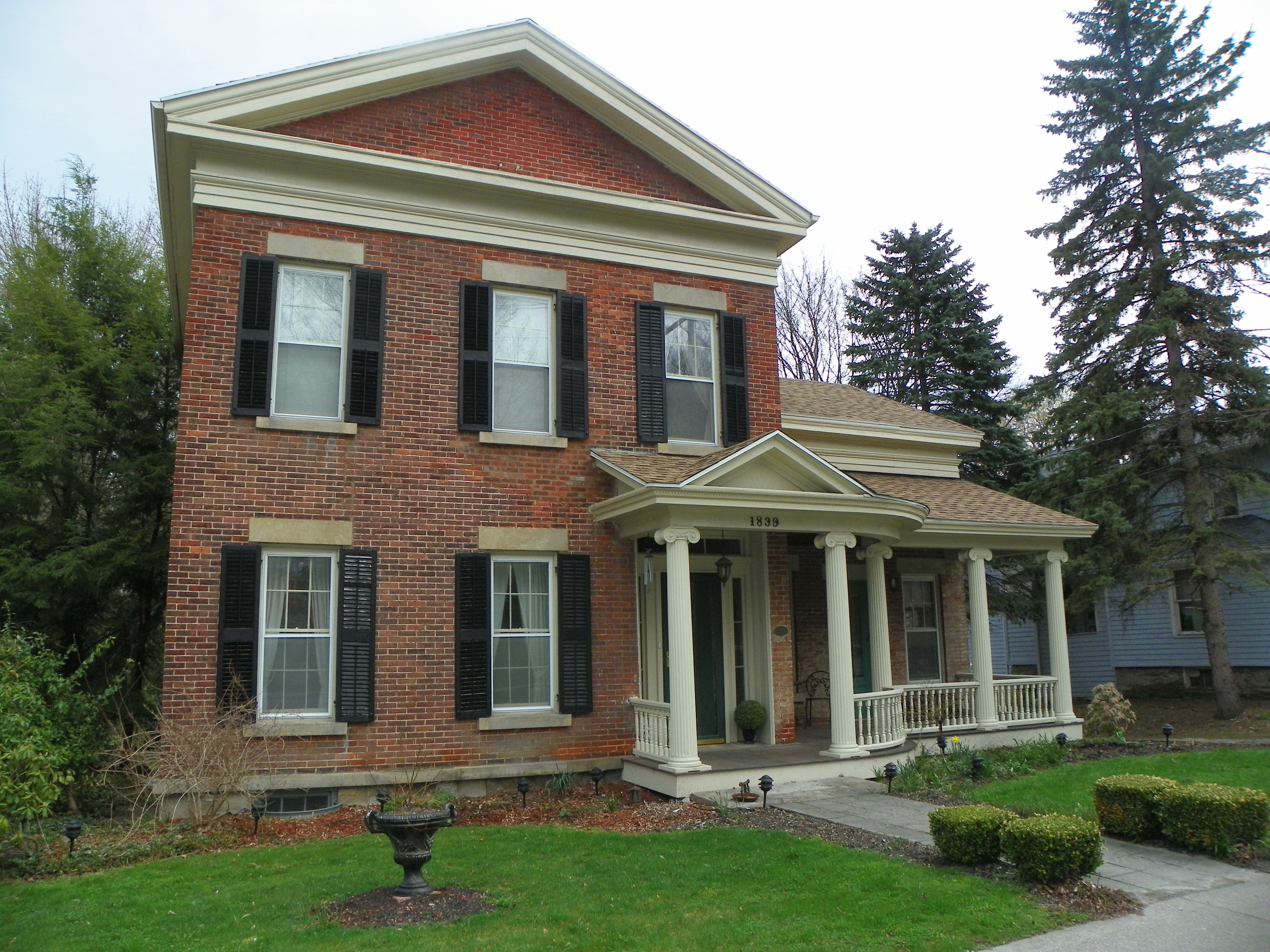

- Location within New York Location within the United States
- Interactive map showing the location of Cargill House
- Location: 1839 Rochester St., Lima, New York
- Coordinates: 42°54′27″N 77°36′42″W
- Area: 1.4 acres (0.57 ha)
- Built: 1852
- Architectural style: Greek Revival
- MPS: Lima MRA
- NRHP reference No.: 89001126
- Added to NRHP: August 31, 1989

Cargill House is a historic home located at Lima in Livingston County, New York. It was built about 1852 and is an elegant L-shaped, Greek Revival–style brick dwelling. It features a 2-story, three-bay, side-hall main block with a pedimented gable oriented toward the street. Also on the property is a 1 1/2-story carriage barn, two cut-stone hitching posts, and a spring-fed pond.

It was listed on the National Register of Historic Places in 1989.
