= Elias H. Geiger House =

Historic house in New York, United States

- U.S. National Register of Historic Places
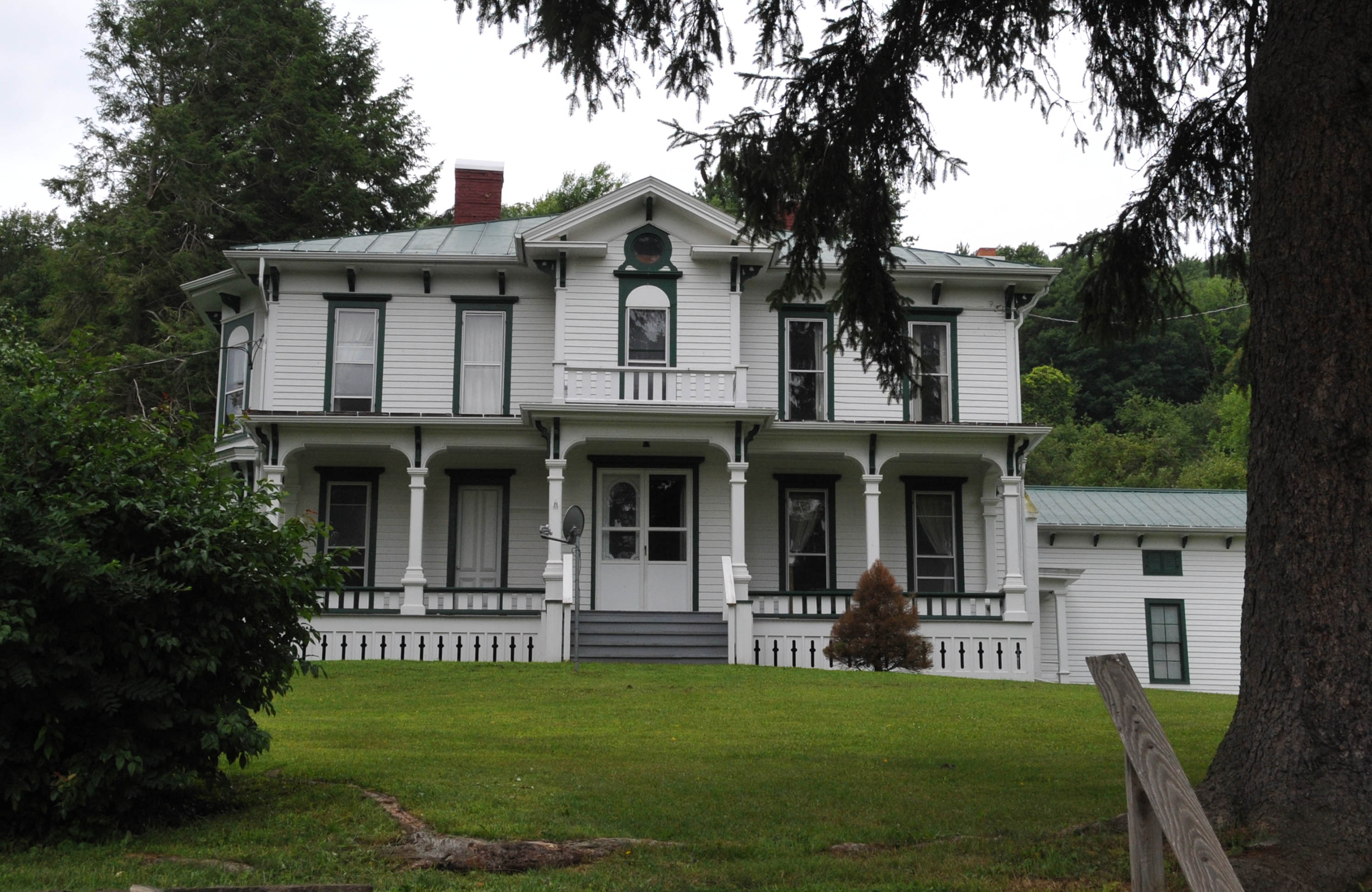

- Location within New York Location within the United States
- Nearest city: Dansville, New York
- Coordinates: 42°35′59″N 77°43′52″W
- Area: 182.6 acres (73.9 ha)
- Architect: Geiger, Elias H.
- Architectural style: Italianate
- NRHP reference No.: 06000267
- Added to NRHP: April 12, 2006

Elias H. Geiger House, also known as the Geiger-Weidman House, is a historic home located at Ossian near Dansville in Livingston County, New York. It is a large two story wood frame Italianate style building built in 1866 or 1867 by master carpenter Elias H. Geiger. Also on the property are two contributing barns constructed in 1937.

It was listed on the National Register of Historic Places in 2006.
