= Spencer House (Lima, New York) =

Historic house in New York, United States

- U.S. National Register of Historic Places
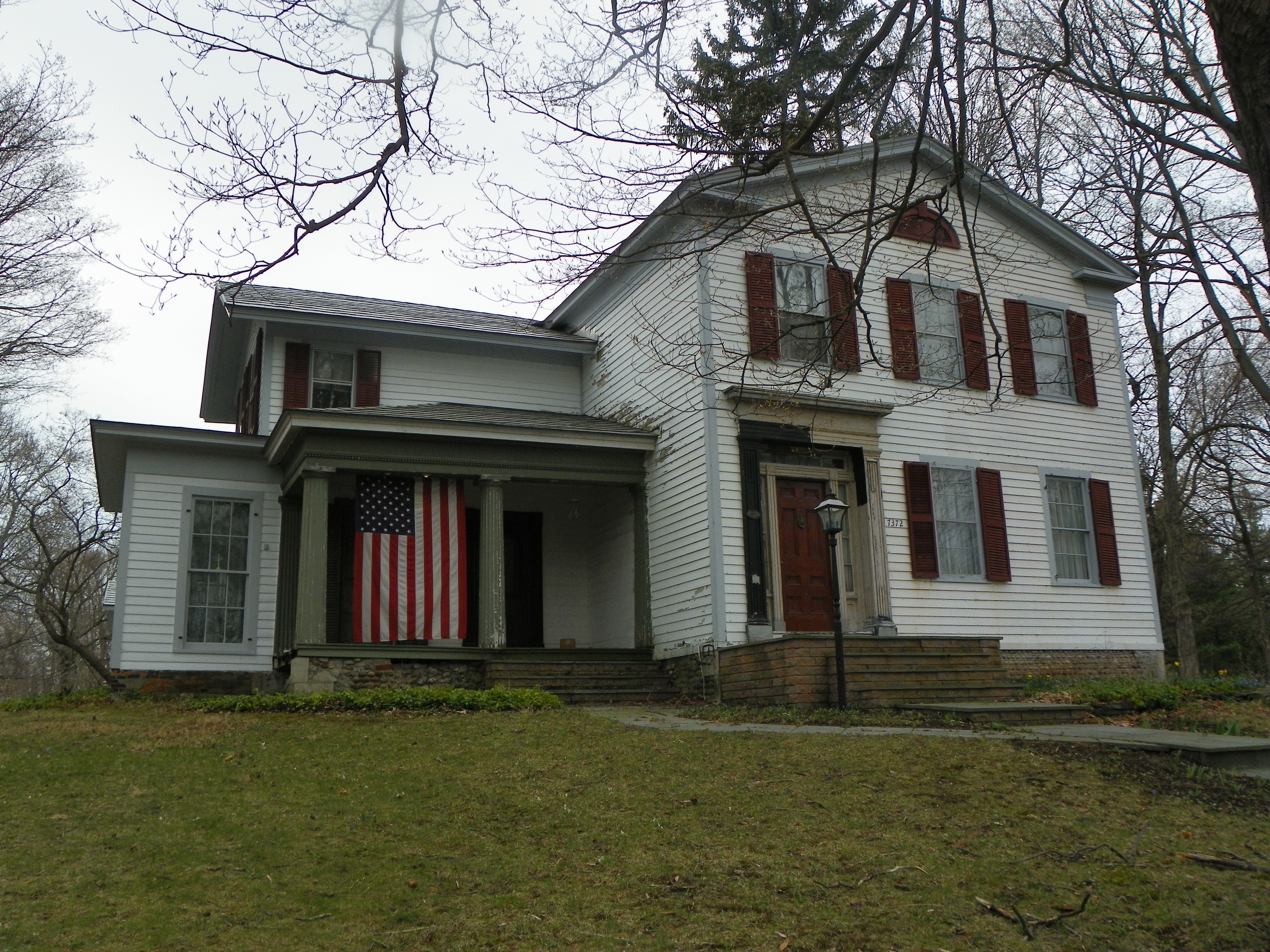

- Location within New York Location within the United States
- Location: 7372 E. Main St., Lima, New York
- Coordinates: 42°54′20″N 77°36′31″W
- Area: 0.8 acres (0.32 ha)
- Architectural style: Greek Revival, Federal
- MPS: Lima MRA
- NRHP reference No.: 89001124
- Added to NRHP: August 31, 1989

Spencer House is a historic home located at Lima in Livingston County, New York. It is believed to date to the 1830s, enlarged in the 1850s and 1860s. It is a two-story, L-shaped frame building with clapboard siding, a cobblestone foundation, and low-pitched gable roofs. The main block evinces the persistence of Federal period architectural traditions with the two-story, three-bay, side-hall form, delicate louvered fan in the front gable, and slender frieze and corner boards. Also on the property is a contributing 19th century carriage house.

It was listed on the National Register of Historic Places in 1989.
