= Morgan Cobblestone Farmhouse =

Historic house in New York, United States

- U.S. National Register of Historic Places
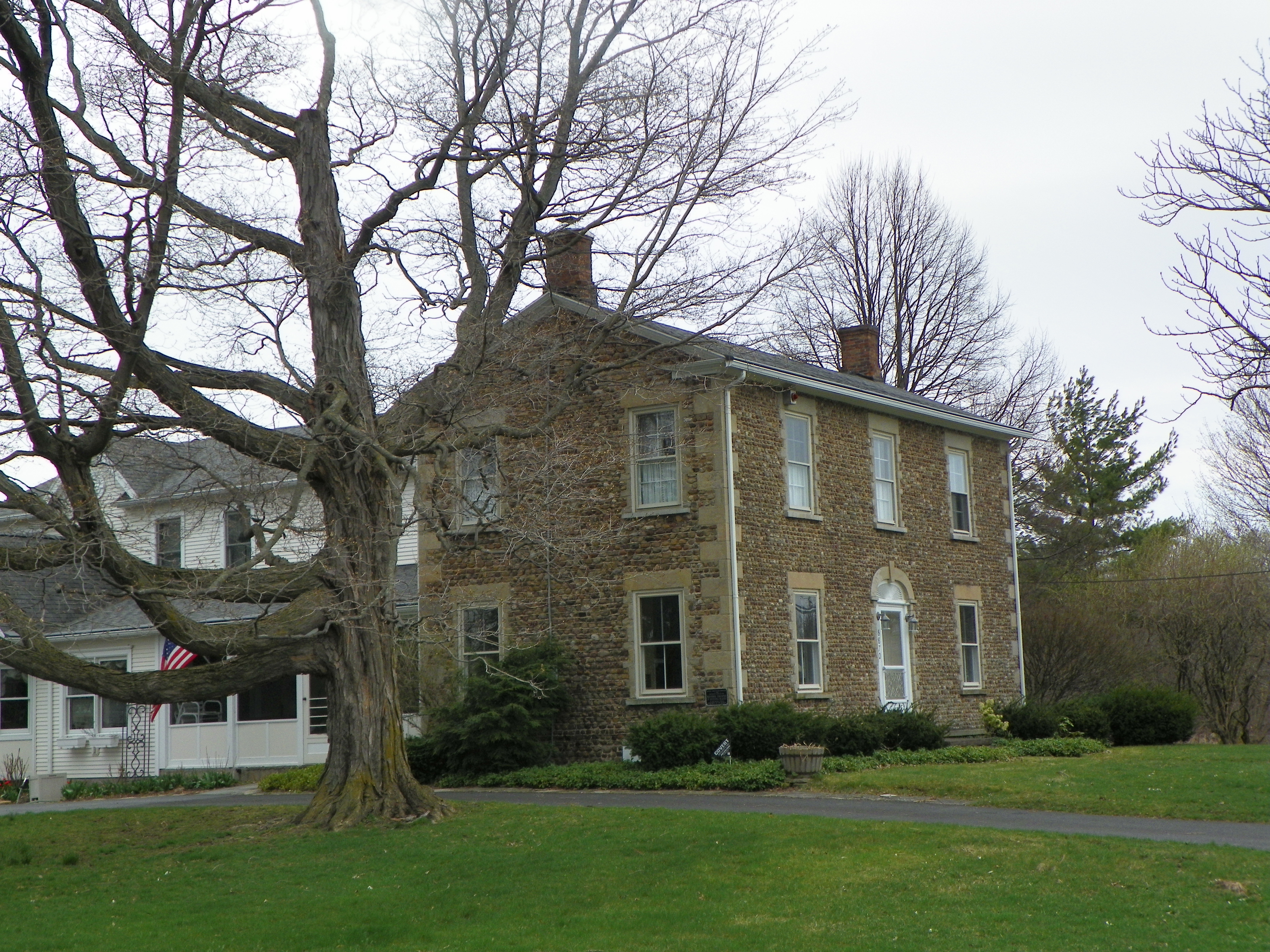

- Location within New York Location within the United States
- Location: 6870 W. Main Rd., Lima, New York
- Coordinates: 42°54′6″N 77°37′55″W
- Area: 5 acres (2.0 ha)
- Built: 1832
- Architectural style: Greek Revival, Federal
- MPS: Lima MRA
- NRHP reference No.: 89001118
- Added to NRHP: August 31, 1989

Morgan Cobblestone Farmhouse is a historic home located at Lima in Livingston County, New York. It was constructed in 1832 and is a two-story, three-bay cobblestone main block with a two-story rear wing. It was built in the late Federal / early Greek Revival style. It features irregularly shaped, variously sized and colored cobbles in its construction. Also on the property is a historic hitching post.

It was listed on the National Register of Historic Places in 1989.
