= William Harmon House (Lima, New York) =

Historic house in New York, United States

- U.S. National Register of Historic Places
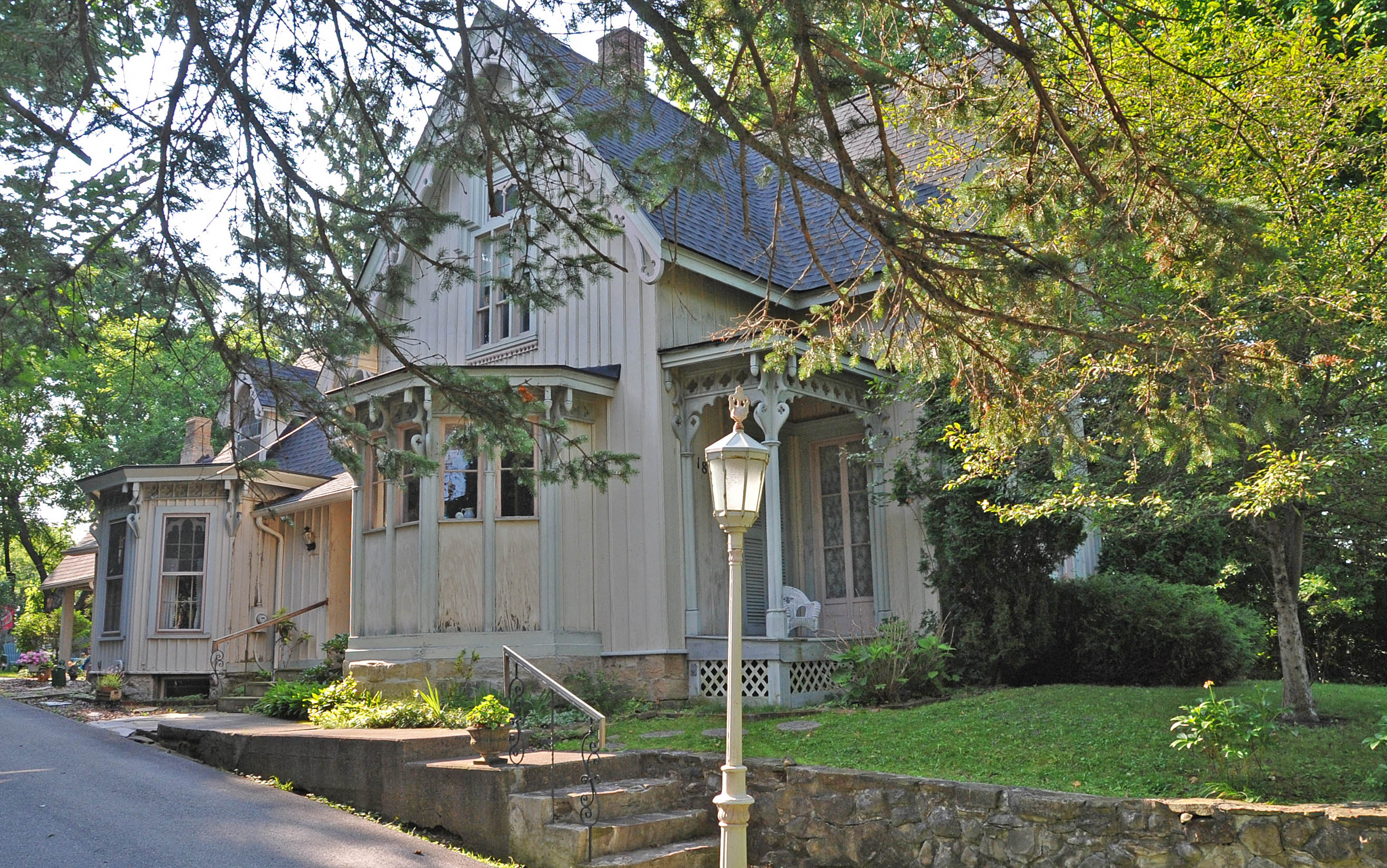

- Location within New York Location within the United States
- Location: 1847 Genesee St., Lima, New York
- Coordinates: 42°54′24″N 77°36′50″W
- Area: less than one acre
- Built: 1851
- Architect: Harmon, William
- Architectural style: Gothic Revival
- MPS: Lima MRA
- NRHP reference No.: 89001130
- Added to NRHP: August 31, 1989

William Harmon House is a historic home located at Lima in Livingston County, New York. It was built about 1851 and is a 1 1/2-story Gothic Revival style board-and-batten cottage in a cruciform plan. The exterior and interior features rich Gothic ornamentation.

It was listed on the National Register of Historic Places in 1989.
