= Clark Farm Complex =

Historic house in New York, United States

- U.S. National Register of Historic Places
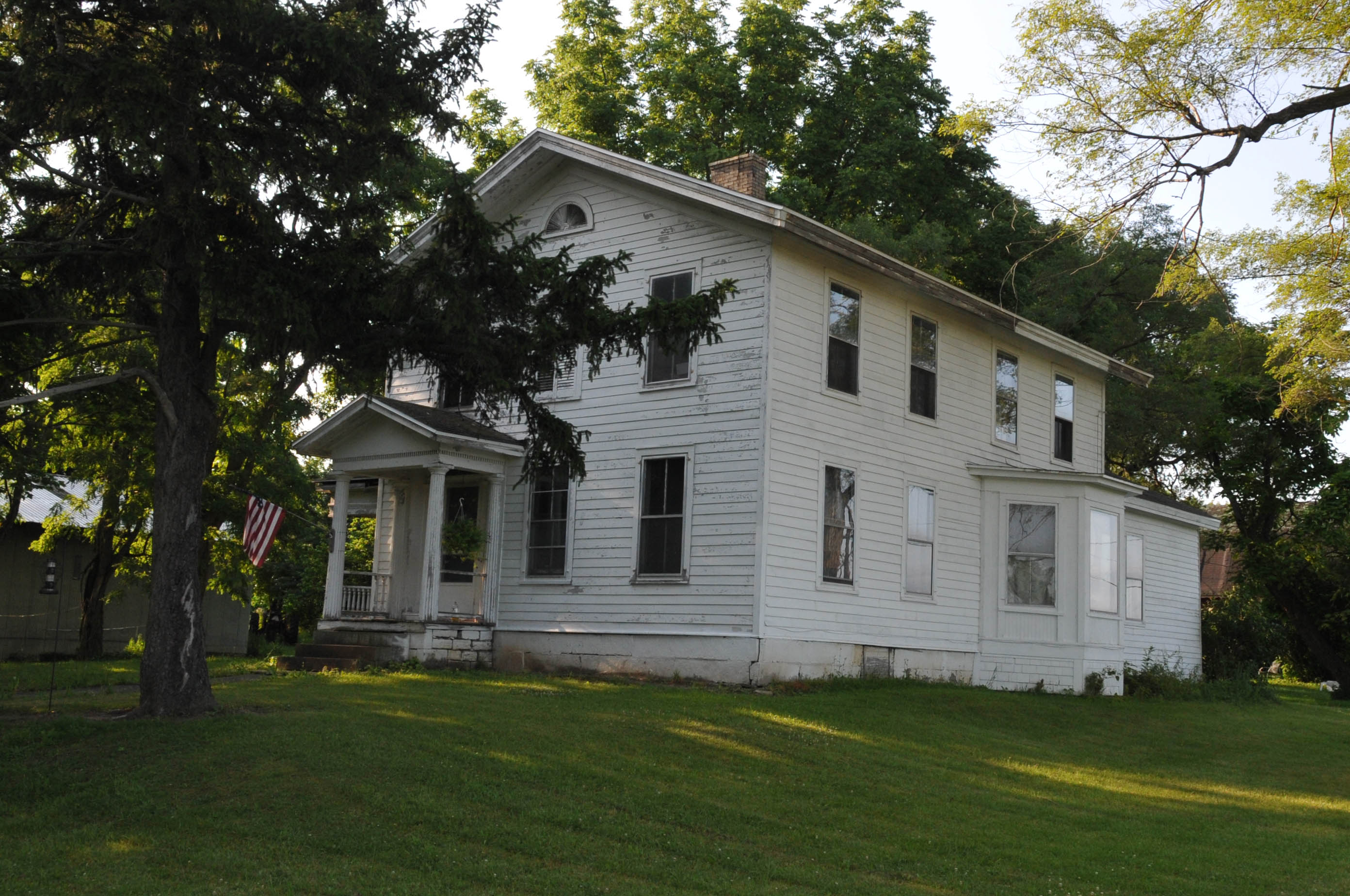

- Location within New York Location within the United States
- Location: 7646 E. Main Rd., Lima, New York
- Coordinates: 42°54′13″N 77°35′37″W
- Area: 130 acres (53 ha)
- Architectural style: Greek Revival, Federal
- MPS: Lima MRA
- NRHP reference No.: 89001125
- Added to NRHP: August 31, 1989

Clark Farm Complex is a historic home and farm complex located at Lima in Livingston County, New York. It is a large working farm composed of a mid-19th century farmhouse and full complex of farm related support structures. The farmhouse was constructed in the early 1830s. There are twelve related farm dependencies dating from the mid-19th century to early 20th century. They include a well house, smoke house, privy, garage, and chicken house.

It was listed on the National Register of Historic Places in 1989.
