= Asahel Warner House =

Historic house in New York, United States

- U.S. National Register of Historic Places
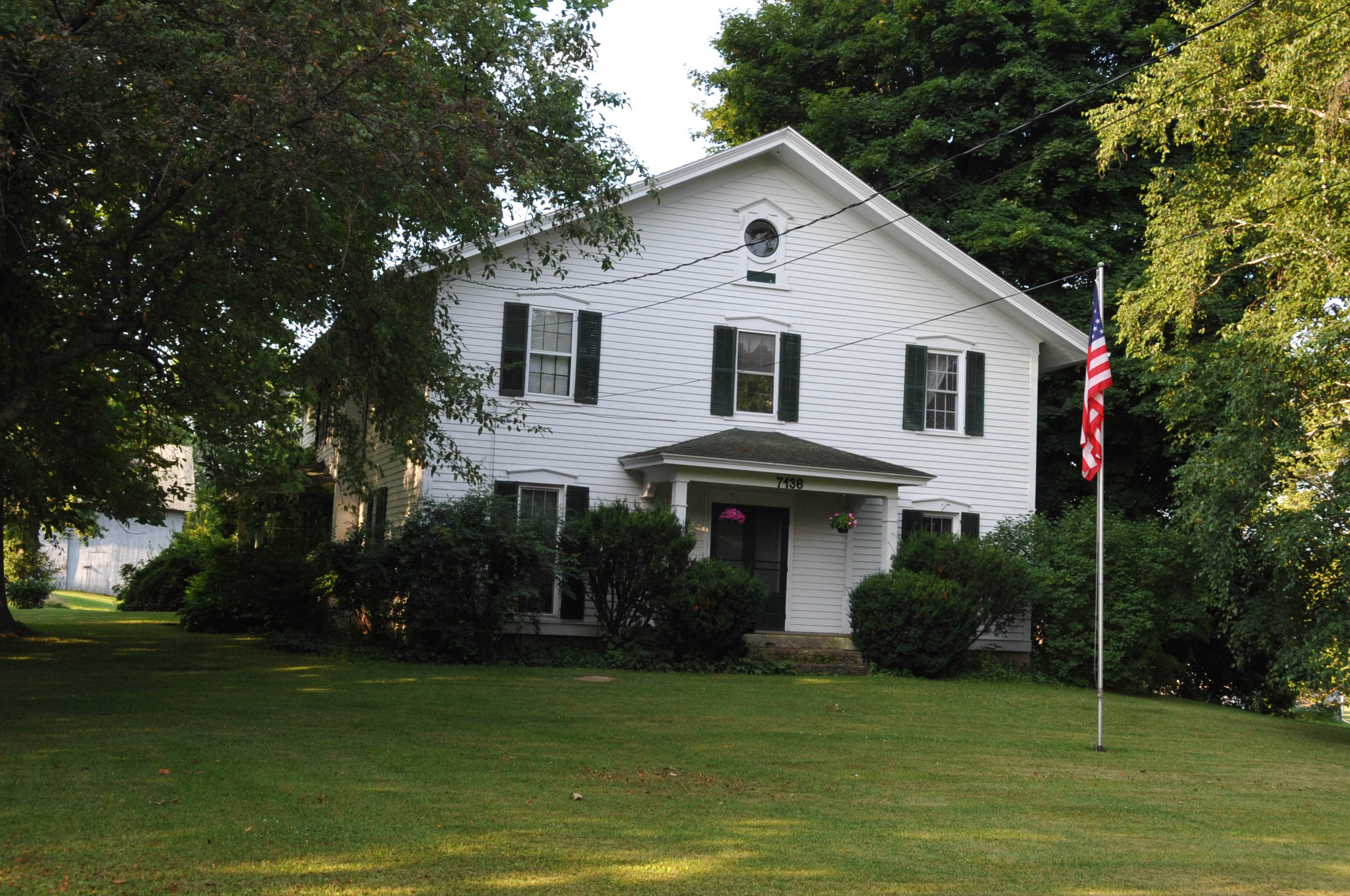

- Location within New York Location within the United States
- Location: 7136 W. Main St., Lima, New York
- Coordinates: 42°54′9″N 77°37′15″W
- Area: 1.7 acres (0.69 ha)
- Built: 1810
- Architect: Warner, Asahel
- MPS: Lima MRA
- NRHP reference No.: 89001139
- Added to NRHP: August 31, 1989

Asahel Warner House is a historic home located at Lima in Livingston County, New York. It was built about 1810 and is a large two-story, three-bay, rectangular frame dwelling with its gable end oriented toward the street. A one-story kitchen wing is located at the rear. It was remodeled in the 1860s / 1870s and in 1907 and features Italianate details. A third-floor attic contains a Masonic Lodge meeting room with paneling dated to 1907. It is set into the eaves of the front two-thirds of the building and lit only by the front oculus window. Also on the property are a contributing barn, shed, and chicken coop.

It was listed on the National Register of Historic Places in 1989.
