= Matthew Warner House =

Historic house in New York, United States

- U.S. National Register of Historic Places
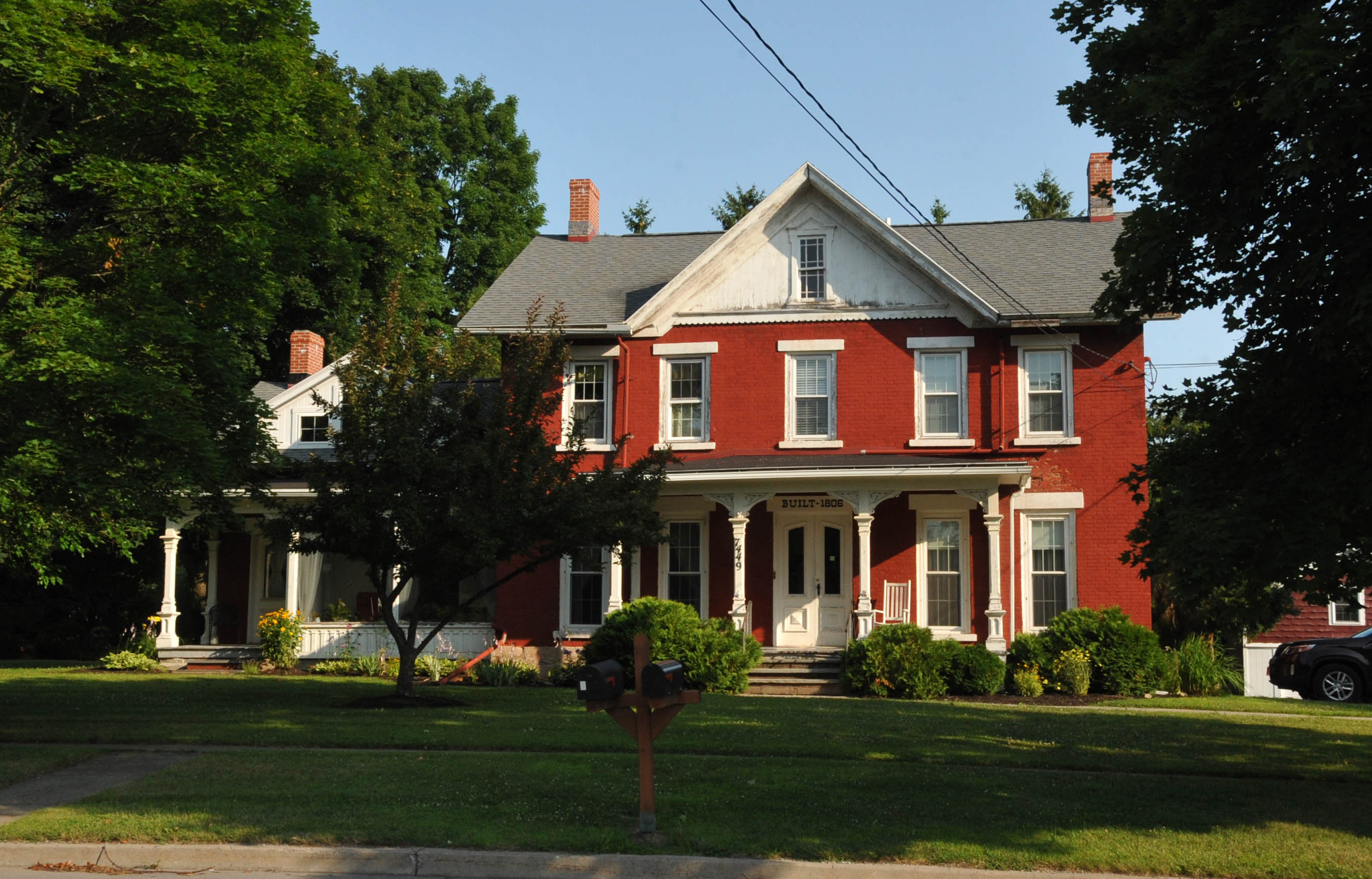

- Location within New York Location within the United States
- Location: 7449 E. Main St., Lima, New York
- Coordinates: 42°54′30″N 77°36′15″W
- Area: 0.8 acres (0.32 ha)
- Architect: Warner, Matthew
- MPS: Lima MRA
- NRHP reference No.: 89001138
- Added to NRHP: August 31, 1989

Matthew Warner House is a historic home located at Lima in Livingston County, New York. It was built about 1806 and is a rectangular two story, five bay wide center hall brick residence with a one-story three bay side wing. It was remodeled in the 1860s and in the 1920s. The 1860s remodeling resulted in the picturesque Gothic / Italianate character with the prominent cross cut gable and decorative front verandah. The house was used as an inn in the early 19th century and as a roadside restaurant in the 1930s.

It was listed on the National Register of Historic Places in 1989.
