= Genesee Wesleyan Seminary and Genesee College Hall =

- U.S. National Register of Historic Places
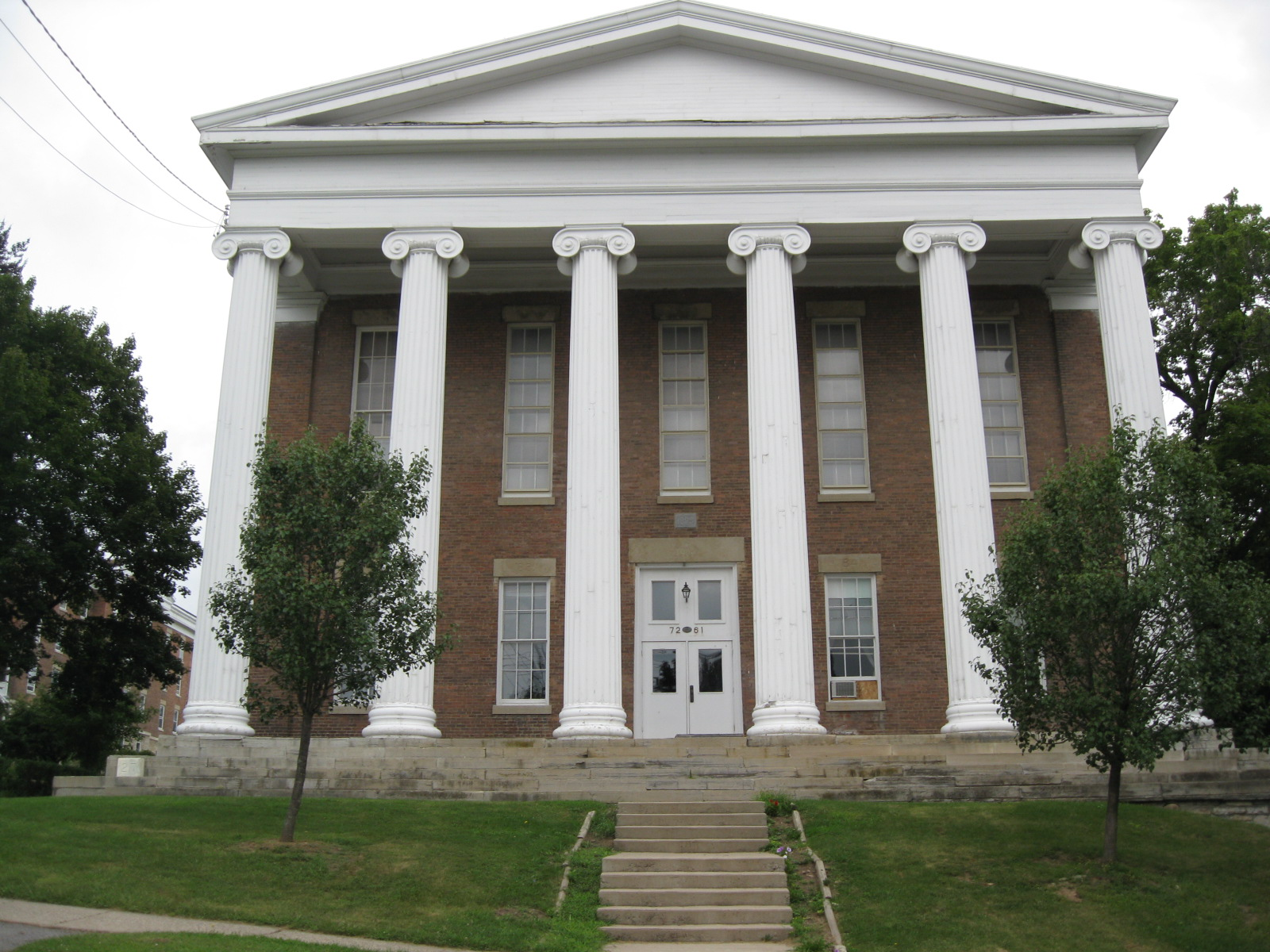
- Genesee College Hall, August 2009

- Location within New York Location within the United States
- Location: College St., Lima, New York
- Coordinates: 42°54′32″N 77°36′53″W
- Area: 5 acres (2.0 ha)
- Built: 1842
- Architect: Anderson, William; Coleman, C.B.
- Architectural style: Neoclassical
- NRHP reference No.: 76001227
- Added to NRHP: July 19, 1976

Genesee Wesleyan Seminary and Genesee College Hall are two historic buildings located on the campus of Elim Bible College at Lima in Livingston County, New York. The Genesee Wesleyan Seminary building was constructed in 1842 and now serves as the college Administration Building. It is a 4 1/2-story neoclassical–style brick structure. It features a 2-story verandah composed of two tiers of sturdy columns. The Genesee College Hall was completed in 1851 and is a complete neoclassical temple form. It measures two and a half stories high and five bays wide, with an Ionic hexastyle portico extending the length of the south facade.

It was listed on the National Register of Historic Places in 1976.
