= School No. 6 =

- U.S. National Register of Historic Places
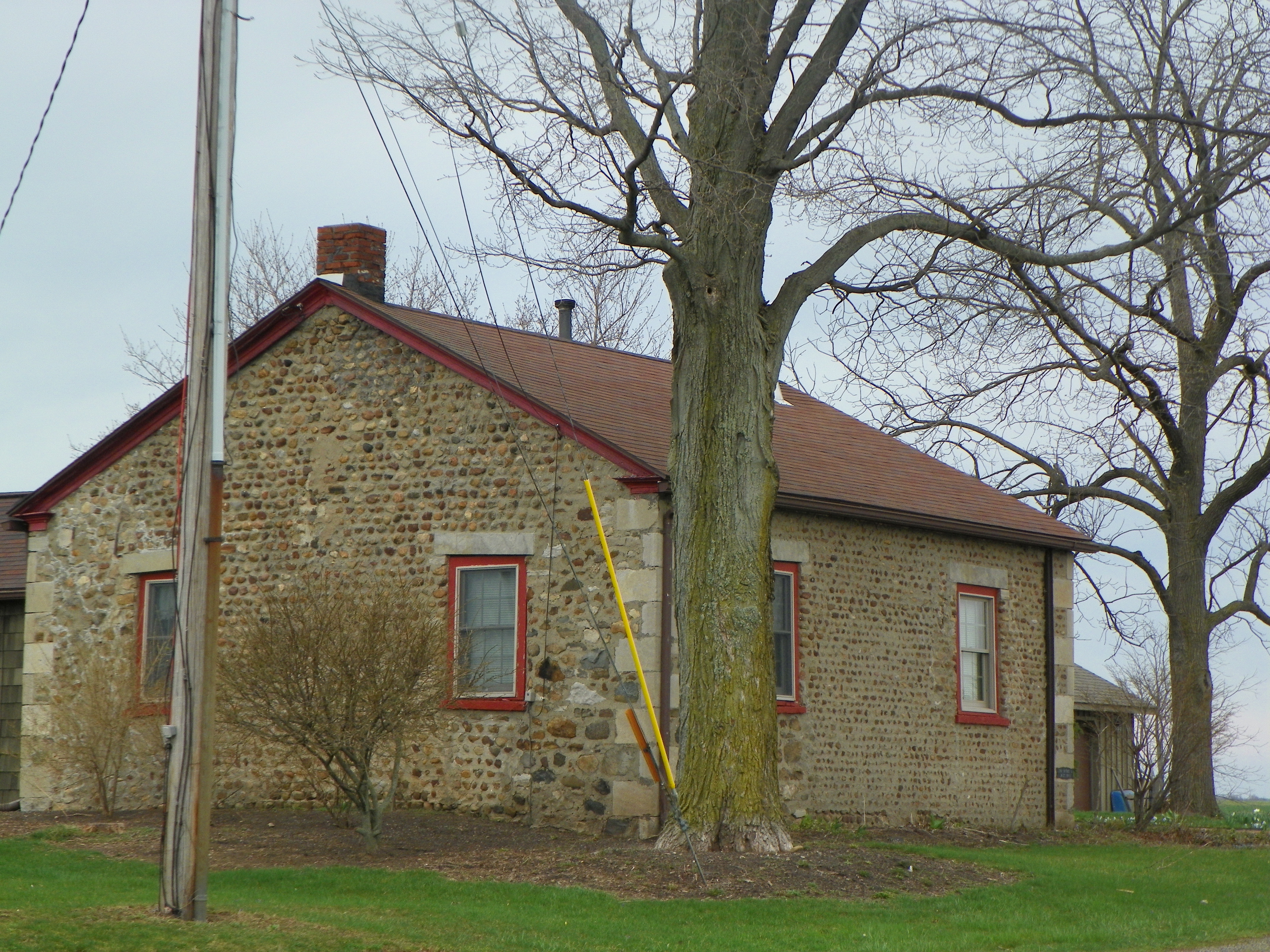

- Location within New York Location within the United States
- Location: 6679 Jenks Rd., Lima, New York
- Coordinates: 42°52′36″N 77°38′44″W
- Area: 1.7 acres (0.69 ha)
- Built: 1843
- MPS: Lima MRA
- NRHP reference No.: 89001121
- Added to NRHP: August 31, 1989

School No. 6 is a historic school building located at Lima in Livingston County, New York. It was constructed about 1843 and is a 1-story, vernacular Greek Revival cobblestone building consisting of a two-by-two-bay main block with a one-by-one-bay east wing. It features irregularly shaped, variously sized, and colored cobbles in its construction. The school closed in 1943 and was converted to a residence after 1953.

It is listed on the National Register of Historic Places since 1989.
