= Rail and Titsworth Canal Warehouse =

Historic commercial building in New York, United States

- U.S. National Register of Historic Places
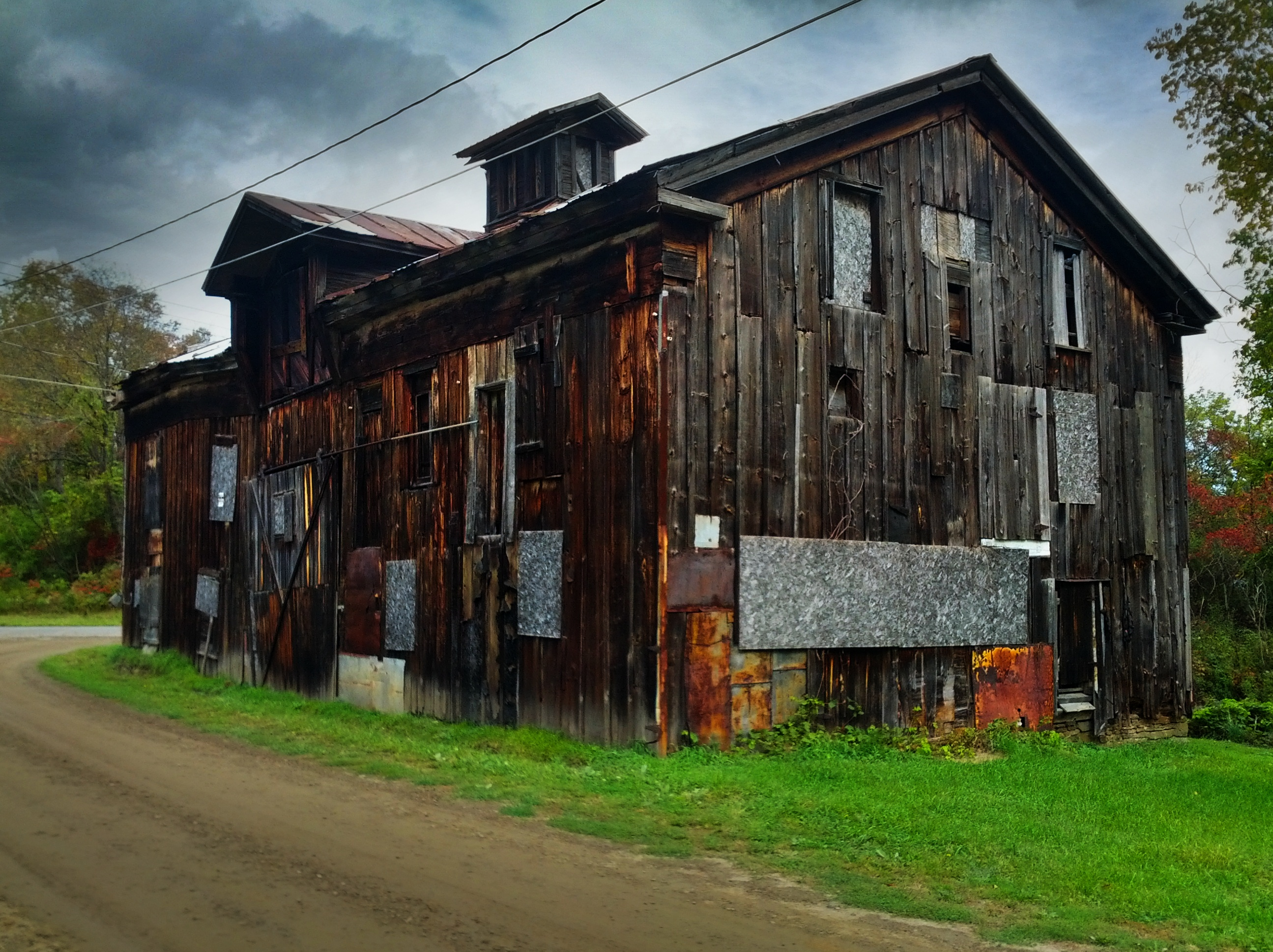
- Rail and Titsworth Canal Warehouse, September 2012

- Location within New York Location within the United States
- Location: Hughes Rd., Belfast, New York
- Coordinates: 42°20′33″N 78°7′33″W
- Area: 1.5 acres (0.61 ha)
- Built: 1853
- NRHP reference No.: 00000987
- Added to NRHP: August 16, 2000

Rail and Titsworth Canal Warehouse, also known as DeCilio's, is a historic canal warehouse building located at Belfast in Allegany County, New York. It is the oldest surviving warehouse from along the route of the Genesee Valley Canal, later Genesee Valley Canal Railroad. It was built about 1853 in the Greek Revival style. Built originally as a warehouse, over the years the structure has been used as a hotel, brothel, barn, and storehouse.

It was listed on the National Register of Historic Places in 2000.
