= Genesee Valley Canal Railroad =

Former railroad in western New York, U.S.

Overview
- Locale: Hinsdale, New York to Rochester, New York
- Dates of operation: 1882–

Technical
- Track gauge: 4 ft 8 1/2 in (1,435 mm) standard gauge

The Genesee Valley Canal Railroad was a part of the Pennsylvania Railroad system in western New York. It was built on the former Genesee Valley Canal alignment.

== History ==
=== Genesee Valley Canal: 1836-1878 ===
On May 6, 1836 an act was passed in New York authorizing the construction of the Genesee Valley Canal, running from the Erie Canal in Rochester southwest along the Genesee River valley to Mount Morris, Portageville, and Belfast, and then cross-country to the Allegheny River at Olean, with a branch from Mount Morris paralleling the Canaseraga Creek to Dansville.

On September 1, 1840 the canal was opened to navigation from Rochester to Mount Morris. The extension to Dansville opened in fall 1841, and by then the split between the Dansville branch and the main line was set at Sonyea, southeast of Mount Morris.

After some partial openings, the full line was opened at the beginning of navigation in 1862, running to Olean on the Allegheny River and beyond to Mill Grove, on the river just north of the Pennsylvania state line. However, by then, the Main Line of Public Works and Pennsylvania Railroad had been completed, opening up the interior of Pennsylvania without depending on New York, and there was no interest in improving the Allegheny River. Instead, the Buffalo, Bradford and Pittsburgh Railroad, connecting to the river at Carrollton, west of Olean, was used as a reason to continue building the canal.

On June 4, 1877 the legislature approved an abandonment of the canal on or after September 30, 1878. The canal was sold on November 6, 1880 to the Genesee Valley Canal Railroad, which had been chartered July 15 of that year.

=== Genesee Valley Canal Railroad: 1880-1990s ===
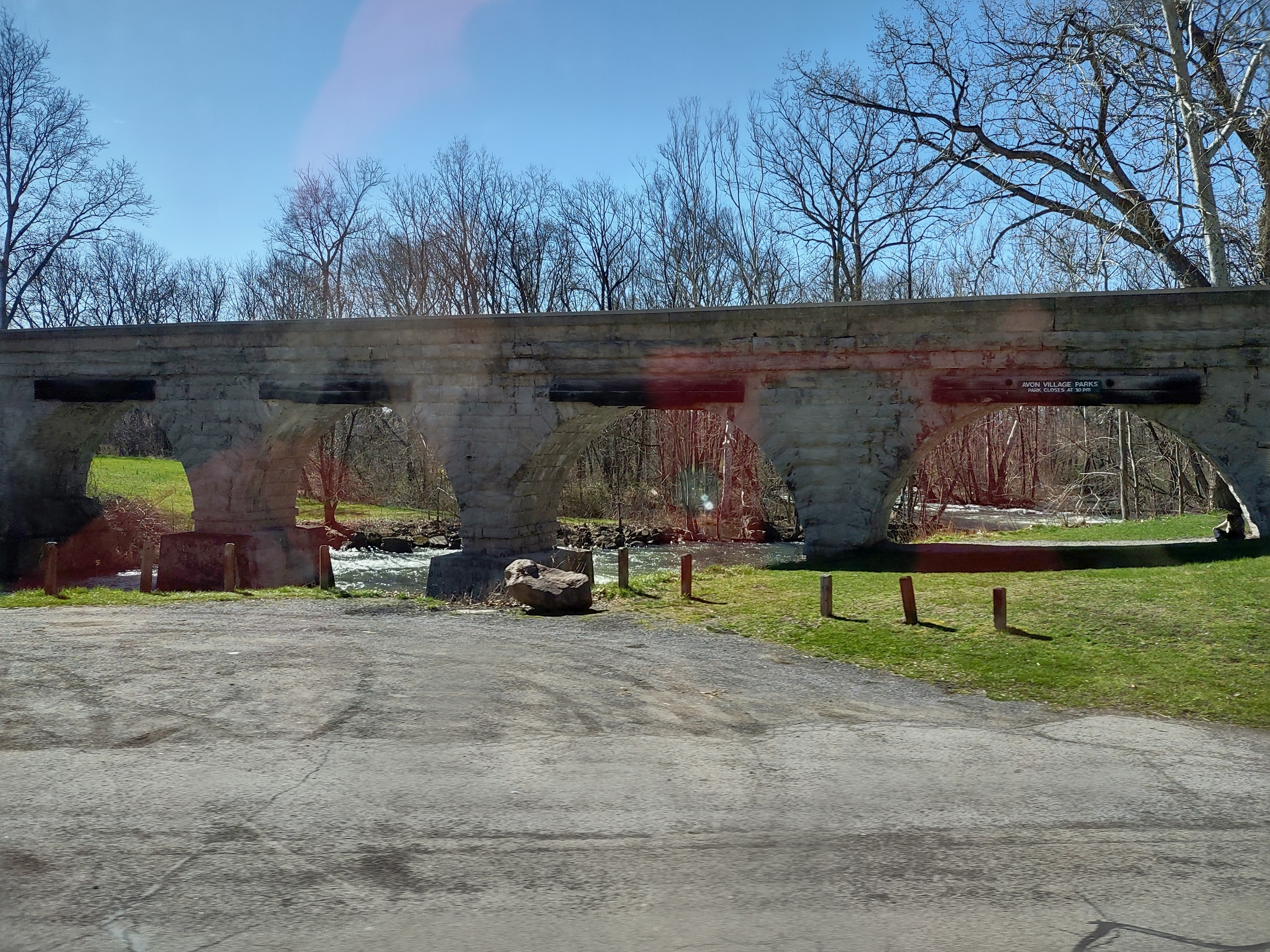
Five Arches Bridge over Conesus Outlet in Avon

The railroad began construction, and opened its line in 1882 from Rochester to Hinsdale. At Hinsdale it connected to the Buffalo, New York and Philadelphia Railway, and the rest of the canal south to and through Olean was not used as it closely paralleled the BNY&P. The Genesee Valley Canal Railroad was immediately leased to the BNY&P.

The branch of the canal to Dansville was not used for a railroad, but two railroads already served that corridor - the Erie and Genesee Valley Railroad and the Delaware, Lackawanna and Western Railroad's New York, Lackawanna and Western Railroad.

The Rochester, Nunda and Pennsylvania Railroad had built a line roughly parallel to the canal between Mount Morris and Nunda, turning southeast there to Swain. In 1881 the part north of Nunda was abandoned, and on July 11 of that year, the company was consolidated into the Rochester, New York and Pennsylvania Railroad. That company opened a new line in 1882 from Nunda northeast to the new Genesee Valley Canal Railroad at Nunda Junction, and the Buffalo, New York and Philadelphia Railway leased it that year.

The Genesee Valley Terminal Railroad was incorporated August 14, 1882, and in 1883 opened a branch from the Genesee Valley Railroad southwest of Rochester north to a junction with the New York Central Railroad main line at Lincoln Park.

In September 1887 the Western New York and Pennsylvania Railroad acquired the Buffalo, New York and Philadelphia Railroad and with it the Genesee Valley Canal Railroad. In 1900 the Pennsylvania Railroad leased the WNYP.

A short branch from Scottsville west to Garbutt on the Baltimore and Ohio Railroad's Rochester and State Line Railroad opened on September 16, 1907. This three mile section of track was abandoned in 1944, and no trace of it exists today.

On November 15, 1912 the Genesee Valley Canal Railroad and Genesee Valley Terminal Railroad merged to form the Pennsylvania and Rochester Railroad. That company was absorbed on February 28, 1916 into the Western New York and Pennsylvania Railway, still leased by the Pennsylvania Railroad. In 1968 the PRR merged into Penn Central, and in 1976 became part of Conrail. The full line from Rochester to Hinsdale (minus a short spur immediately south of Rochester) was abandoned in 1963.

== Genesee Valley Canal: 1991-present ==
In 1991, the Genesee Valley Greenway project was begun. This project is to transform the abandoned canal and railroad routes into a recreational pathway.
