= Jesse Peterson =

American industrialist and politician

- Born: October 1, 1850; Belfast, New York
- Died: October 22, 1921 (aged 71); Lockport, New York
- Education: Bryant & Stratton College in Buffalo, New York
- Occupation: President of United Indurated Fibre Company
- Political party: Bourbon Democrat
- Spouse: Arabella A. Brown
- Children: Jesse Dudley Peterson; Clara Peterson Nichols
- Parent(s): Gilbert Peterson; Elizabeth Parker Peterson
- Relatives: Charles Gilbert Peterson

Jesse Peterson (October 1, 1850 – October 22, 1921), was an American industrialist and politician from Lockport, New York. In 1886, Jesse Peterson, along with Henry G. Cordley, and Charles E. Folger, started the United Indurated Fibre Company. By 1893 the company was incorporated under New Jersey laws, with the factory and general office in Lockport. About 300 hands are employed in the manufacture of household articles from the indurated fibre, the basis of which is wood pulp. In addition to the United Indurated Fibre Company, Jesse Peterson was the President of the Buffalo Warehouse & Distributing Company, Owner of the Cascade Pulp Mills, Director and Vice President of the Lockport Water & Electric Company and an associate of Peterson & Sons.

At one point, Jesse Peterson, and his wife Arabella A. Peterson, daughter of former Lockport mayor Albert Field Brown, moved into the Italianate mansion located at 414 Locust St. in Lockport. Arabella's obituary from 1929 states that “she had long been prominent in the social and musical circles of the city” and that funeral services were held at the home.

Peterson was an influential Bourbon Democrat and in 1892 he was a Presidential Elector in support of Grover Cleveland, the party faction's sole Presidential success. He served for a time as Police Commissioner and Railroad Commissioner before being nominated as Mayor of Lockport.

Peterson was born in Belfast, New York, and attended Bryant & Stratton College in Buffalo. He was the son of Gilbert Peterson, brother of Charles Gilbert Peterson and the great-uncle of Charles Sterling Bunnell.
