= Mount Morris (village), New York =

Mount Morris, New York
- Village
- Location within New York Location within the United States
- Coordinates: 42°43′23″N 77°52′37″W
- Country: United States
- State: New York
- County: Livingston
- Town: Mount Morris

Area
  - Total: 2.05 sq mi (5.30 km^{2})
  - Land: 2.05 sq mi (5.30 km^{2})
  - Water: 0 sq mi (0.00 km^{2})
- Elevation: 630 ft (192 m)

Population (2020)
  - Total: 2,898
  - Density: 1,415.3/sq mi (546.45/km^{2})
- Time zone: UTC-5 (Eastern (EST))
  - Summer (DST): UTC-4 (EDT)
- ZIP code: 14510
- Area code: 585
- FIPS code: 36-48945
- GNIS feature ID: 0957862
- Website: www.villageofmountmorrisny.gov

Mount Morris is a village in the town of Mount Morris in Livingston County, New York, United States. The village population was 2,986 at the 2010 census, out of 4,465 in the entire town. The village and town are named after Robert Morris.

The village is at the northeastern entrance to Letchworth State Park, which contains a scenic gorge and triple waterfall on the Genesee River.

== History ==
The community was first called "Allen Hill" and "Richmond Hill" by early settler Ebenezer "Indian" Allen. The village of Mount Morris was incorporated in 1835. It was named after Robert Morris, a financier of the American Revolution, and later owner of the Morris Reserve, from which the lands around Mount Morris were sold to settlers.

The main trade route in the town's early days was the Genesee Valley Canal which ran south from the Erie Canal at Rochester to Olean. The canal was abandoned in the 1870s and later used as a railroad right of way for a succession of railroads, which eventually consolidated into the Pennsylvania Railroad. The Friends of the Genesee Valley Greenway have built hiking trails along some of the canal route.

Mount Morris Academy was an important early school, but it closed in 1867.

Just upstream (west) from the village on the Genesee River is the Mount Morris Dam (550 feet (170 m) long, 216 feet (66 m) high), which was built between 1948 and 1952 for flood control of the lower Genesee Valley. An earlier and much smaller dam, still extant in the village, was used for mills; now it is a small hydroelectric generating station.

In the early 21st century, Greg O'Connell, a retired New York City detective and developer of properties in Red Hook, Brooklyn, bought 19 buildings along the town's Main Street in an effort to revive the downtown area.

=== National Register of Historic Places ===
The following sites and historic districts are listed on the National Register of Historic Places.

| | Name on the Register | Image | Date listed | Location | City or town | Description |
|---|---|---|---|---|---|---|
| 1 | House at No. 13 Grove Street | House at No. 13 Grove Street | January 7, 1999 (#98001582) | 13 Grove St. 42°43′41″N 77°52′37″W | Mount Morris | |
| 2 | House at No. 176 South Main Street | House at No. 176 South Main Street | January 7, 1999 (#98001581) | 176 S. Main St. 42°43′08″N 77°52′16″W | Mount Morris | |
| 3 | House at No. 30 Murray Street | House at No. 30 Murray Street | January 7, 1999 (#98001585) | 30 Murray St. 42°43′22″N 77°52′32″W | Mount Morris | |
| 4 | House at No. 48 Grove Street | | January 7, 1999 (#98001583) | 48 Grove St. 42°43′39″N 77°52′54″W | Mount Morris | |
| 5 | House at No. 8 State Street | House at No. 8 State Street | January 7, 1999 (#98001580) | 8 State St. 42°43′33″N 77°52′24″W | Mount Morris | |
| 6 | Gen. William A. Mills House | Gen. William A. Mills House | December 19, 1978 (#78001858) | 14 Main St. 42°43′36″N 77°52′31″W | Mount Morris | |
| 7 | Murray Street Historic District | Murray Street Historic District | March 1, 1996 (#96000178) | 33-47 and 32-46 Murray St. 42°43′18″N 77°54′05″W | Mount Morris | |
| 8 | New Family Theater | New Family Theater | August 1, 1997 (#97000846) | 102 Main St. 42°43′27″N 77°52′26″W | Mount Morris | |
| 9 | St. John's Episcopal Church | St. John's Episcopal Church | July 19, 1991 (#91000892) | Jct. of State and Stanley Sts. 42°43′28″N 77°52′36″W | Mount Morris | |
| 10 | South Main Street Historic District | South Main Street Historic District | March 1, 1996 (#96000177) | 123-159 and 124-158 S. Main St. 42°43′18″N 77°52′18″W | Mount Morris | |
| 11 | State and Eagle Streets Historic District | State and Eagle Streets Historic District | March 1, 1996 (#96000179) | 16-34 and 15-39 State St. and 6-12 Eagle St. 42°43′28″N 77°52′42″W | Mount Morris | |

== Notable people ==
- Roscoe C. Barnes, who hit the first recorded home run in professional baseball and is credited with the title of the first batting champion of the National League
- Francis Bellamy, author of the United States Pledge of Allegiance
- Mary Seymour Howell, a native daughter, was a suffragette and associate of Susan B. Anthony. She died in 1913.
- John Wesley Powell, the first white man to navigate and chart the Colorado River
- Joseph Strauss, inventor, admiral in the United States Navy

== Geography ==
Mount Morris is located in western Livingston County at 42°43′23″N 77°52′37″W (42.722996, -77.877001), in the northern part of the town of Mount Morris. According to the United States Census Bureau, the village has a total area of 2.0 square miles (5.3 km^{2}), all land. The Genesee River forms the northern border of the village (and the town), while Allens Creek and Damonsville Creek flow through the village.

New York State Route 36 and New York State Route 408 intersect in the village. Geneseo, the county seat, is 6 miles (10 km) to the northeast. Interstate 390 passes 2 miles (3 km) east of the village, leading north 36 miles (58 km) to Rochester and southeast 65 miles (105 km) to Corning.

=== Climate ===
Compared to the rest of Upstate New York (and all of the northeastern United States), Mount Morris receives relatively little precipitation. A 1910 study reported an average annual total of 25.3 inches (640 mm) of precipitation, making Mount Morris the driest place in New York. More recent data puts the annual precipitation at 27.7 inches (700 mm).

== Transport ==
Mount Morris is on the Rochester-to-Dansville line of the Rochester & Southern Railroad. The R&S Rochester-to-Dansville line through Mount Morris was originally part of the New York (Hoboken) to Buffalo Main Line of the Delaware, Lackawanna and Western Railroad (DL&W). This through route, made redundant by the 1960 Erie Lackawanna merger, was downgraded in 1963 with the abandonment of a portion of the line between nearby Groveland and Wayland, over torturous Dansville Hill. The Erie Lackawanna Railway thereafter operated over the far easier grades of the former Erie Railroad, via Hornell, to Binghamton and Hoboken.

In addition to the DL&W, Mount Morris was served by three other railroads: 1) It was served by the Rochester-Avon-Mount Morris line of the Erie Railroad from c. 1860 to 1940. From 1907 to 1934 this offered frequent electric railway service from Mount Morris to Rochester. The Erie line to Mount Morris was abandoned in 1940. 2) The Dansville and Mount Morris Railroad (and predecessor Erie & Genesee Valley RR) linked its namesake communities from c. 1871 to 1940. The Mount Morris segment of the railroad was abandoned with the loss of its connection to the Erie in 1940. 3) The Pennsylvania Railroad (and predecessors) served Mount Morris from c. 1882 to c. 1963 on its Olean-Hinsdale-Rochester branch line. The PRR through Mount Morris was abandoned in 1963, and the right-of-way now forms the basis of the Genesee Valley Greenway.

Mount Morris is now the location of the junction with the R&S's branch to the Hampton Corners salt mine. The Hampton Corners line was built in the 1990s and is one of the newest railroad lines in New York state.

== Demographics ==
Historical population
| Census | Pop. | Note | %± |
|---|---|---|---|
| 1870 | 1,930 | | — |
| 1880 | 1,899 | | −1.6% |
| 1890 | 2,286 | | 20.4% |
| 1900 | 2,410 | | 5.4% |
| 1910 | 2,782 | | 15.4% |
| 1920 | 3,312 | | 19.1% |
| 1930 | 3,238 | | −2.2% |
| 1940 | 3,530 | | 9.0% |
| 1950 | 3,450 | | −2.3% |
| 1960 | 3,250 | | −5.8% |
| 1970 | 3,417 | | 5.1% |
| 1980 | 3,039 | | −11.1% |
| 1990 | 3,102 | | 2.1% |
| 2000 | 3,266 | | 5.3% |
| 2010 | 2,986 | | −8.6% |
| 2020 | 2,898 | | −2.9% |
U.S. Decennial Census

As of the census of 2000, there were 3,266 people, 1,307 households, and 794 families residing in the village. The population density was 1,606.0 inhabitants per square mile (620.1/km^{2}). There were 1,412 housing units at an average density of 694.3 per square mile (268.1/km^{2}). The racial makeup of the village was 94.18% White, 1.13% Black or African American, 0.28% Native American, 0.67% Asian, 2.51% from other races, and 1.22% from two or more races. Hispanic or Latino of any race were 5.79% of the population.

There were 1,307 households, out of which 29.2% had children under the age of 18 living with them, 39.6% were married couples living together, 16.1% had a female householder with no husband present, and 39.2% were non-families. 31.0% of all households were made up of individuals, and 13.3% had someone living alone who was 65 years of age or older. The average household size was 2.37 and the average family size was 2.94.

In the village, the population was spread out, with 23.9% under the age of 18, 8.9% from 18 to 24, 27.4% from 25 to 44, 20.8% from 45 to 64, and 19.1% who were 65 years of age or older. The median age was 38 years. For every 100 females, there were 87.6 males. For every 100 females age 18 and over, there were 80.1 males.

The median income for a household in the village was $31,792, and the median income for a family was $37,143. Males had a median income of $32,464 versus $20,052 for females. The per capita income for the village was $15,107. About 12.0% of families and 14.3% of the population were below the poverty line, including 21.8% of those under age 18 and 10.8% of those age 65 or over.
