= Family Theater =

Family Theater or Family Theatre may refer to:

- Family theater, another name used for Theatre for Young Audiences
- Family Theater (Mutual Broadcasting System), an American half-hour dramatic anthology radio program broadcast from 1947-1957
- Family Theater (Rochester, New York), a theatre in Rochester, New York
- Family Theater (Detroit, Michigan), a theatre in Detroit, Michigan
- Family Theater (Kennedy Center), a theatre at the Kennedy Center in Washington, D.C.
- Family Theater (Take 2), an American television program on the Take 2 cable channel
- Family Theater Productions, a production company associated with the Family Rosary Crusade
- Family Theatre, English name for Japanese cable television station Family Gekijo
- New Family Theater, movie theater located at Mount Morris in Livingston County, New York

== See also ==
- Foster Family Theater
- Gorecki Family Theater
- Walden Family Theater
- White House Family Theater
