= State and Eagle Streets Historic District =

Historic district in New York, United States

- U.S. National Register of Historic Places
- U.S. Historic district
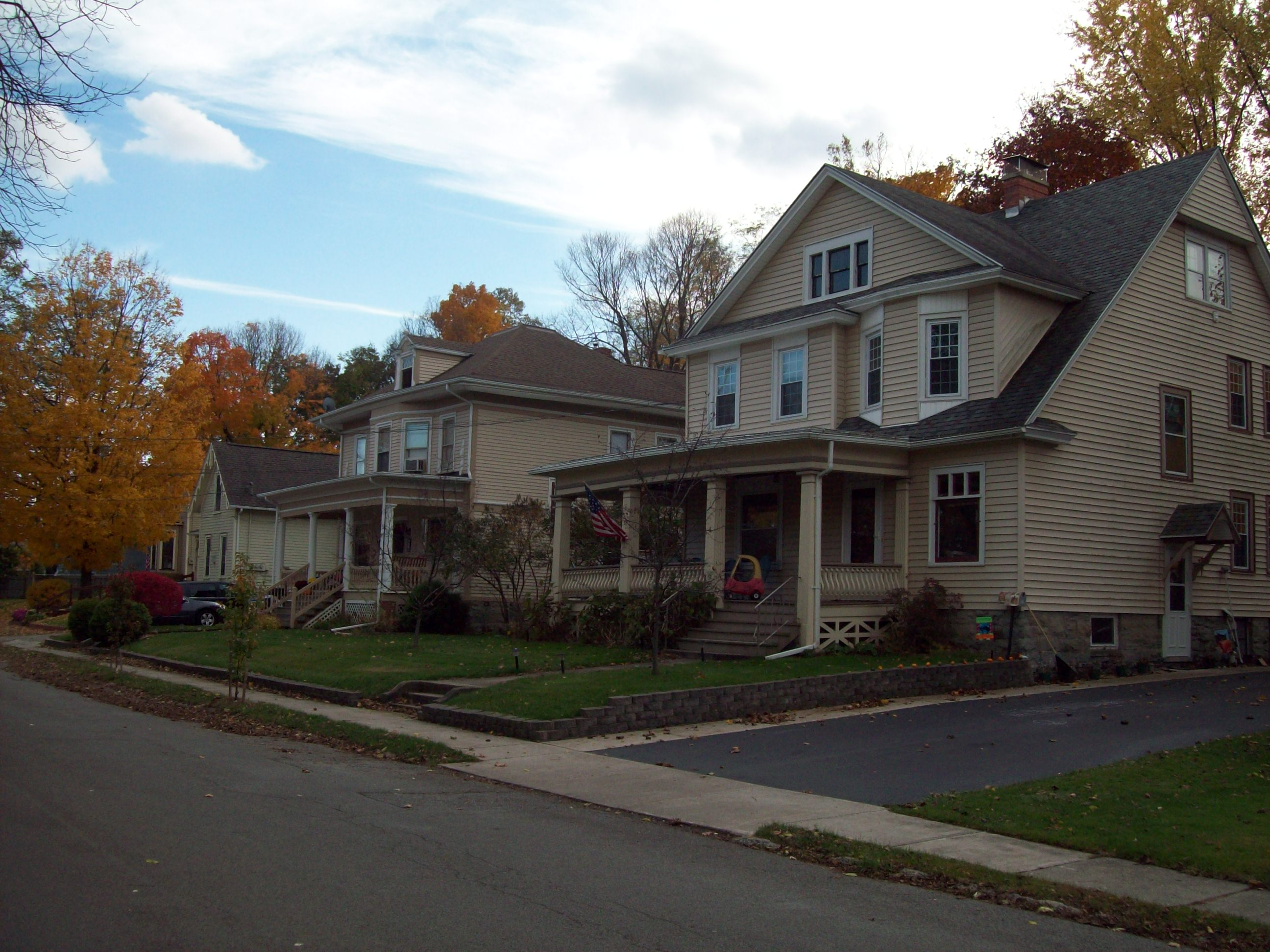
- State and Eagle Streets Historic District, October 2009

- Location within New York Location within the United States
- Location: 16–34 and 15–39 State St. and 6–12 Eagle St., Mount Morris, New York
- Coordinates: 42°43′28″N 77°52′42″W
- Area: 9 acres (3.6 ha)
- Architectural style: Late 19th And 20th Century Revivals, Late Victorian, Mid 19th Century Revival
- MPS: Mount Morris MPS
- NRHP reference No.: 96000179
- Added to NRHP: March 1, 1996

State and Eagle Streets Historic District is a national historic district located at Mount Morris in Livingston County, New York. The district is located in one of the oldest residential neighborhoods in the village. It encompasses 19 contributing primary properties consisting of 16 residences, one parsonage, and two churches; one contributing site, a grave site with granite marker at St. John's Episcopal Church; and four contributing outbuildings, a carriage houses, shed, and two garages.

It was listed on the National Register of Historic Places in 1996.
