= Cuba Lake =

- Location within New York
- Location: Allegany and Cattaraugus counties, New York
- Coordinates: 42°14′57″N 78°17′32″W
- Type: Reservoir
- Primary inflows: Rawson Creek
- Primary outflows: Cuba Lake Outlet
- Catchment area: 16,316 acres (66.03 km^{2})
- Basin countries: United States
- Surface area: 454 acres (1.84 km^{2})
- Average depth: 17 ft (5.2 m)
- Max. depth: 49 ft (14.9 m)
- Shore length^{1}: 6 mi (9.7 km)
- Surface elevation: 1,542 ft (470 m)
- ^{1} Shore length is not a well-defined measure.

Cuba Lake is a 454-acre (1.84 km^{2}) reservoir in Allegany and Cattaraugus counties, New York.

Originally known as the Oil Creek Reservoir, Cuba Lake was created in 1858 to help maintain water levels on the Genesee Valley Canal. Cuba Lake and its surrounding land is owned by New York State, and was managed as the Cuba Reservation between 1912 and 2011. Today, cottage and home sites on the lake are officially leased from the state as part of the Cuba Lake District.

Cuba Lake is a regionally popular fishing and boating destination, with several sportfish and panfish species available.

== Description ==
Cuba Lake is a reservoir located north of the village of Cuba, primarily within the town of Cuba in Allegany County, with a small portion extending into Cattaraugus County. The 454-acre (1.84 km^{2}) lake has a maximum depth of 49 feet (14.9 m) and an average depth of 17 feet (5.2 m); during the winter, the lake is drawn down by six to eight feet (1.8 to 2.4 m). The lake is fed by Rawson Creek at its northwest end, and drains south through the Cuba Lake Outlet, a tributary to Oil Creek. The lake's watershed covers 16,316 acres (25.49 sq mi; 66.03 km^{2}).

== History ==
Originally known as the Oil Creek Reservoir, Cuba Lake was constructed between 1852 and 1858 to serve as a feeder reservoir for the Genesee Valley Canal. The reservoir was impounded by a 60-foot-tall (18 m) dam built at a cost of $150,000. When first completed, the reservoir covered 480 acres (1.9 km^{2}); after being deepened in 1864 and 1872, the reservoir reached a high-water area of 708 acres (2.87 km^{2}). At the time, it was claimed as the largest artificial lake in New York State.

In 1878, the Genesee Valley Canal Railroad was completed, replacing the Genesee Valley Canal. The reservoir and a portion of the former canal were retained to help maintain water levels on the Erie Canal. Later, after New York State announced their intention to drain the reservoir, lobbying by former canal superintendent Charles Wyvelle led to the reservoir being saved. The reservoir remained at its high-water mark until 1889, when the water level was lowered by 7.5 feet (2.3 m) to relieve fears raised by the Johnstown Flood that had occurred that year.

=== Cuba Reservation ===
An act of the New York State Legislature established the Cuba Reservation (also known as the Cuba Lake Reservation) in 1912. In doing so, the legislature placed the reservoir and surrounding state lands under control of the New York State Conservation Commission (predecessor to today's Department of Environmental Conservation), who were charged with maintaining the reservoir and encouraging public recreational use of the area.

At the time of the reservation's establishment, Cuba Lake covered 501 acres (2.03 km^{2}) and the state controlled an additional 221 acres (0.89 km^{2}) of land surrounding the reservoir. Before being designated as a reservation, numerous vacation cottages had been erected by private individuals upon the state land. Although the occupiers of these cottages were effectively squatters, the Conservation Commission codified their use of the land by offering five-year leases of the properties (for a $15 annual fee), and established a number of guidelines for the land's use. By 1919, the state had sold nearly 114 acres (0.46 km^{2}) of land not needed for recreation, and had enacted or planned improvements relating to the reservation's roads and trees.

In 1928, control of Cuba Reservation was transferred to the newly created Allegany State Park Commission, which reported to the Conservation Department's Division of Parks. The duties of the Division of Parks would later be transferred to the New York State Office of Parks, Recreation and Historic Preservation, who managed the reservation until 2011. The reservoir and surrounding state property is held by the New York State Office of General Services as of 2015.

=== Cuba Lake District ===
In 1981, the Cuba Lake District was formed to aid in managing the needs of the lake and the surrounding cottages, many of which have been converted to permanent residences in recent years. The Cuba Lake District legally rents the land from New York State, and in turn collects lease fees from residents. It also works to organize maintenance activities on the reservoir and dam, publicize safety bulletins, and develop and enforce regulations.

== Recreation ==
Cuba Lake is a popular regional destination for boating and fishing. Public access to the lake is permitted through a state-managed boat launch located near Rawson Creek's inlet on West Shore Road. Ice fishing access is possible from South Shore Road near the dam. Sportfish species found in Cuba Lake include walleye, smallmouth bass, largemouth bass, northern pike, common carp, yellow perch, rock bass, bluegill, pumpkinseed, brown bullhead, and black crappie.
