= Gilbert Peterson =

American contractor (1824–1890)

- Born: August 5, 1824; Mount Morris, New York, United States
- Died: November 14, 1890 (aged 66); Lockport, New York
- Occupation: Contractor
- Known for: Superintendent of both the eastern and western divisions of the Erie Canal
- Political party: Democratic
- Spouse: Elizabeth Parker Peterson
- Children: 4, Jesse Peterson, Charles Gilbert Peterson, Jennie Peterson, and Elizabeth Peterson
- Parent(s): Garret Cornelisen Peterson; Rebecca Babcock Peterson

Gilbert Peterson (August 5, 1824 – November 14, 1890) was an American general contractor that constructed a number of infrastructure works including waterworks and canals.

== Career ==
Peterson was the founder and President of Peterson & Sons, which he ran with his two sons, Charles Gilbert Peterson and Jesse Peterson. The company executed contracts building the waterworks of Toledo, Ohio; Grand Rapids, Michigan; Milwaukee; part of the Genesee Valley Canal Railroad and worked on multiple reservoirs in the Washington, D.C. area.

He was a partner at Hunt, Peterson & Kinsley, responsible for enlarging Erie Canal between Middleport, New York, and Gasport, New York, in 1855, and canal repairs in Albany, New York, Frankfort, New York, and Kilburn Hill, New York.

Peterson was superintendent of both the eastern and western divisions of the Erie Canal, and in 1867–1868 he was alderman of the 2nd Ward of Lockport, New York.

== Personal life ==
He is the great grandfather of Charles Sterling Bunnell.
