= Murray Street =

Murray Street may refer to:

== Places ==
- Murray Street, Perth, Western Australia
- Murray Street, Hobart, Tasmania, Australia
- Murray Street Historic District, a national historic district located at Mount Morris in Livingston County, New York, U.S.

== Others ==
- Murray Street (album), album by Sonic Youth, a band from New York City
