= South Main Street Historic District (Mount Morris, New York) =

Historic district in New York, United States

- U.S. National Register of Historic Places
- U.S. Historic district
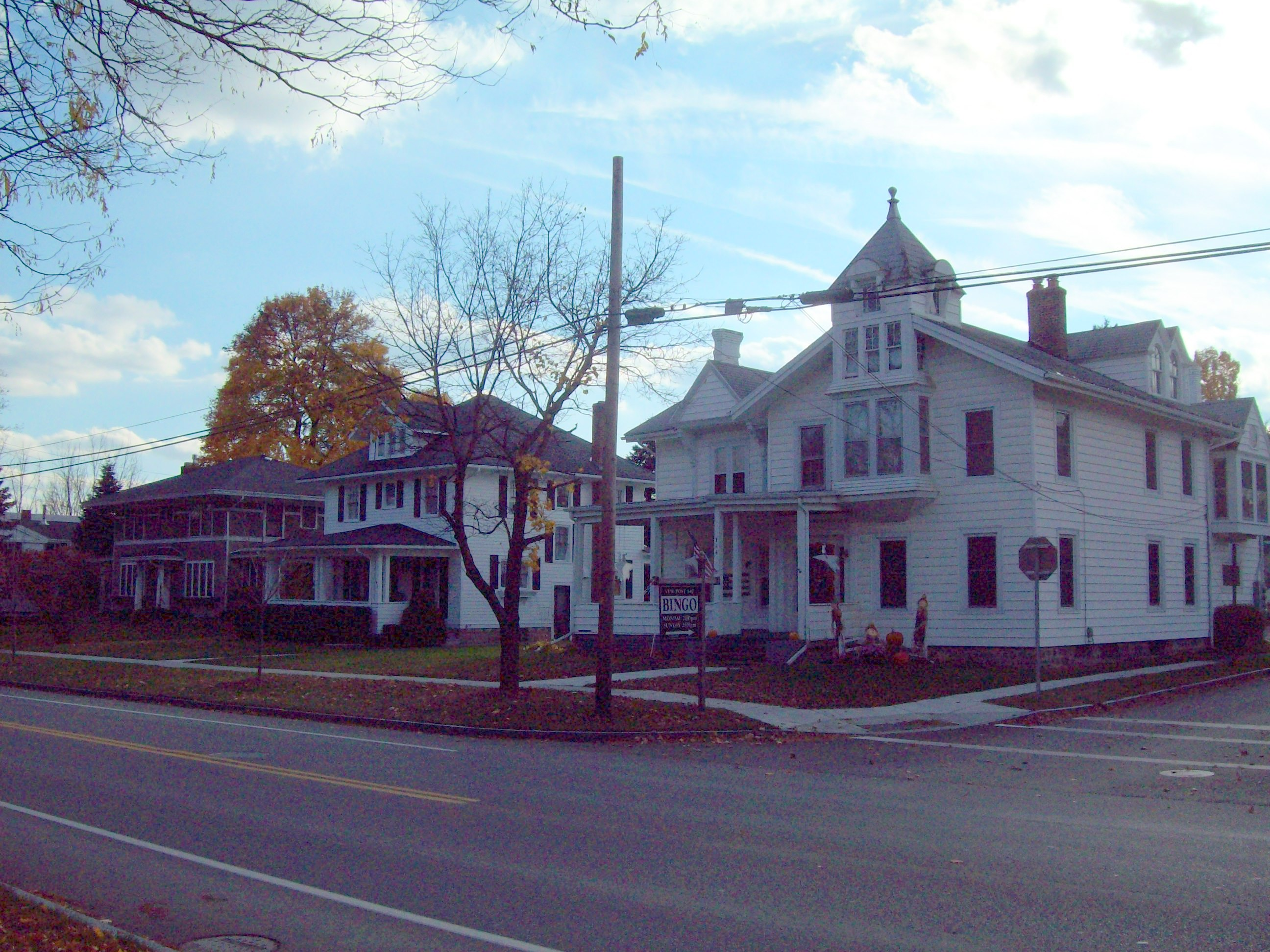
- South Main Street Historic District, Mount Morris NY, October 2009

- Location within New York Location within the United States
- Location: 123–159 and 124–158 S. Main St., Mount Morris, New York
- Coordinates: 42°43′18″N 77°52′18″W
- Area: 12 acres (4.9 ha)
- Architectural style: Greek Revival, Late Victorian, Late 19th And 20th Century Revivals
- MPS: Mount Morris MPS
- NRHP reference No.: 96000177
- Added to NRHP: March 1, 1996

South Main Street Historic District is a national historic district located at Mount Morris in Livingston County, New York. The district encompasses both sides of a three block section of South Main Street (NY-36), one of Mount Morris' premier residential neighborhoods. The district includes 27 contributing residences along with 13 contributing outbuildings, mostly carriage houses and garages. They comprise the largest and most impressive collection of predominantly high style domestic architecture in the village in a broad range of architectural styles.

It was listed on the National Register of Historic Places in 1996.

== Gallery ==
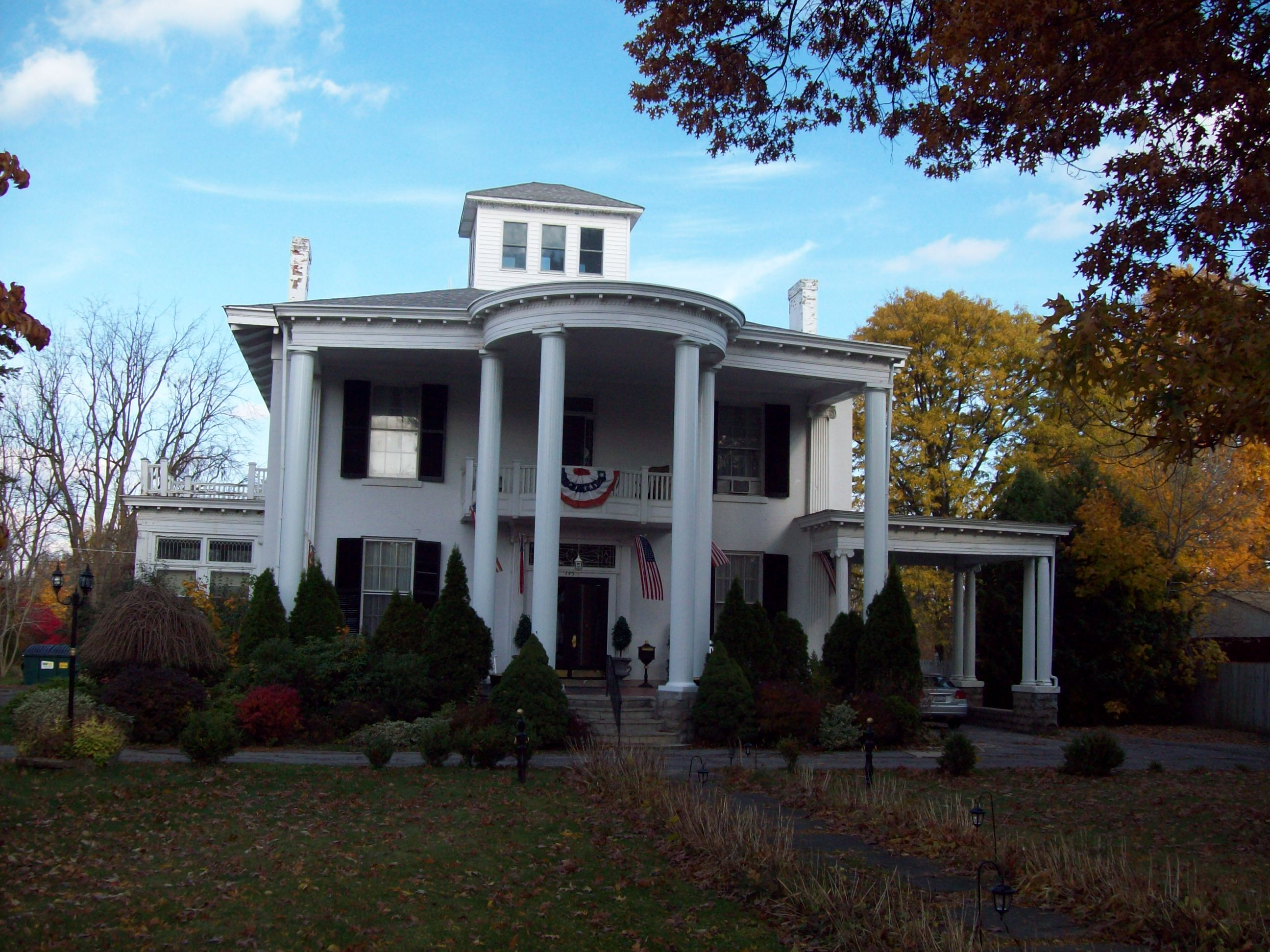
B&B in the South Main Street Historic District, Mount Morris NY, October 2009
