= Charles Gilbert Peterson =

American contractor (1848–1918)

- Born: January 31, 1848; Mount Morris, New York, United States
- Died: October 3, 1918 (aged 70); Lockport, New York, US
- Education: Cornell University
- Occupation: Contractor
- Political party: Democratic
- Spouse: Jennie Zimroda Gray Lapham (m. 1881)
- Children: 3, Rebecca Lapham Peterson, (Charles) Gilbert Peterson, Jennie Gray Peterson
- Parent(s): Gilbert Peterson and Elizabeth Parker Peterson
- Relatives: Jesse Peterson (brother), Charles Sterling Bunnell (grandson)

Charles Gilbert Peterson (January 31, 1848 – October 3, 1918) was an American general contractor.

== Early life and education ==
Peterson was born Mount Morris, New York in 1848 and was a graduate of Cornell University.

== Career ==
As contractor, he was an associate in Peterson & Sons with his father, Gilbert Peterson and brother, Jesse Peterson. The company executed such contracts as the waterworks of Toledo, Ohio and Grand Rapids, Michigan along with a reservoir in Washington, D.C. He was Mayor of Lockport in 1896 and 1897. Peterson along with Sterling H. Bunnell, held a patent on the Furnace Charging Apparatus.

== Personal life ==
On April 27, 1881, Peterson married Jennie Zimroda Gray Lapham in Syracuse, New York. They had three children, Rebecca Lapham Peterson, (Charles) Gilbert Peterson and Jennie Gray Peterson. He is the grandfather of banker Charles Sterling Bunnell.
