= Gen. William A. Mills House =

Historic house in New York, United States

- U.S. National Register of Historic Places
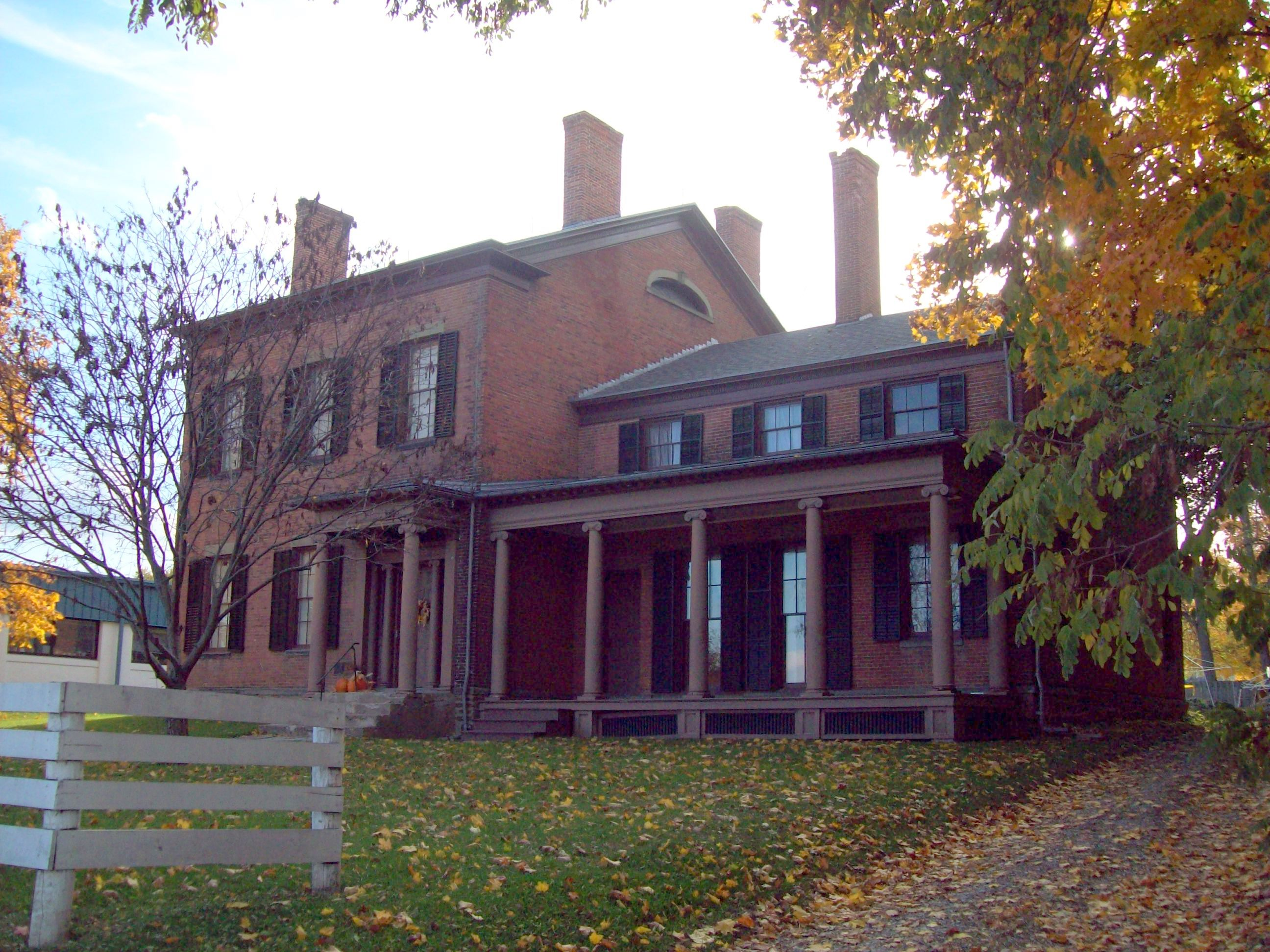
- Gen. William A. Mills House, October 2009

- Location within New York Location within the United States
- Location: 14 Main St., Mount Morris, New York
- Coordinates: 42°43′36″N 77°52′31″W
- Area: 0.3 acres (0.12 ha)
- Built: 1838
- Architect: Hinman, Col. Walker
- Architectural style: Greek Revival, Federal
- NRHP reference No.: 78001858
- Added to NRHP: December 19, 1978

Gen. William A. Mills House is a historic home located at Mount Morris in Livingston County, New York. Constructed in 1838, the Mills Homestead was the last home of Gen. William Augustus Mills (1777–1844), who was the founder and first permanent white settler of Mount Morris. It is a 2 1/2-story brick dwelling combining both the Federal and Greek Revival styles. It is now headquarters of the Mount Morris Historical Society, which is responsible for the maintenance and restoration of the structure. The house is open as a historic house museum known as the Mills Mansion.

It was listed on the National Register of Historic Places in 1978.
