= House at No. 48 Grove Street =

Historic house in New York, United States

- U.S. National Register of Historic Places
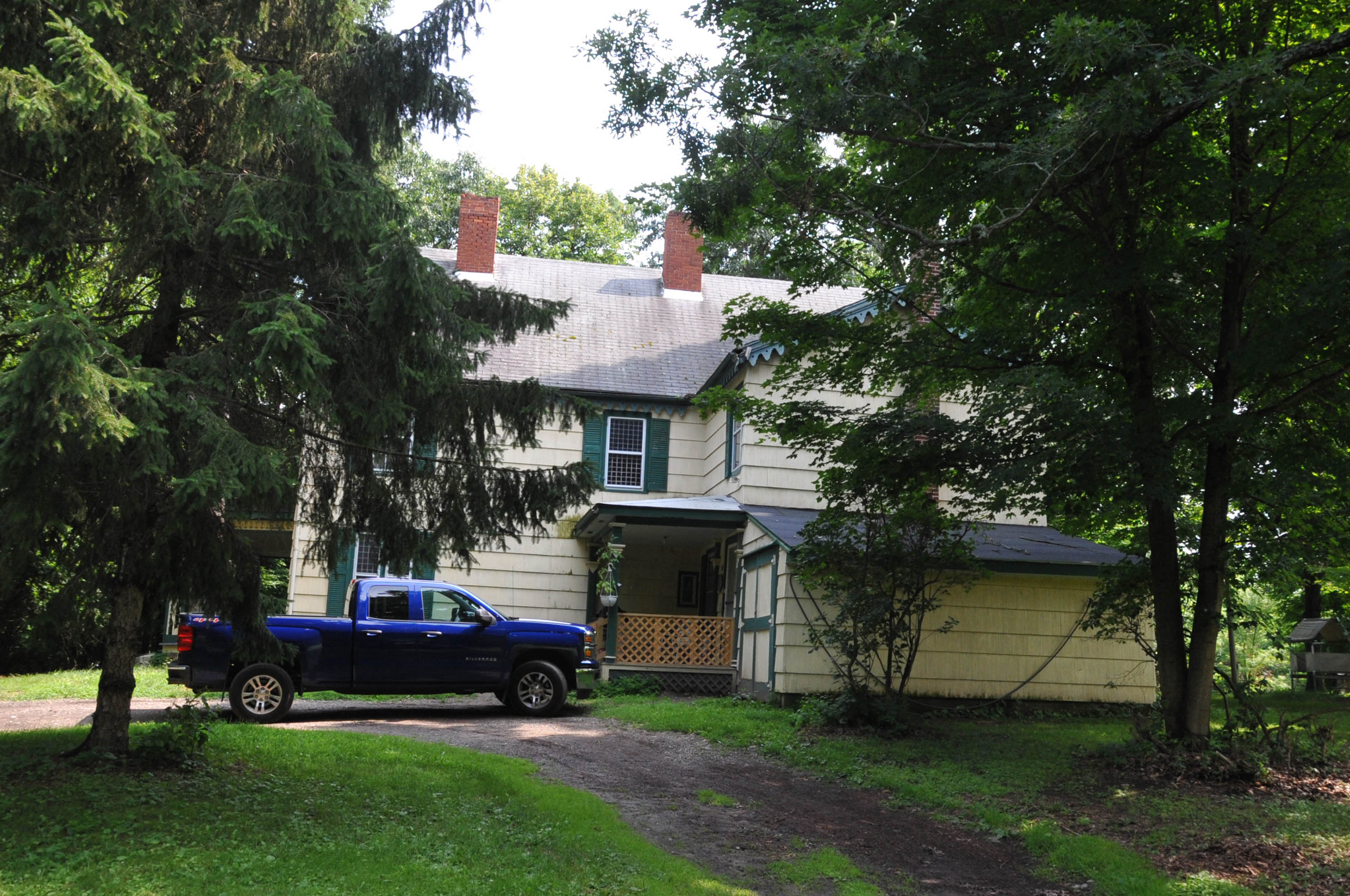

- Location within New York Location within the United States
- Location: 48 Grove St., Mount Morris, New York
- Coordinates: 42°43′39″N 77°52′54″W
- Area: 4.6 acres (1.9 ha)
- Built: 1854
- Architectural style: Late Victorian
- MPS: Mount Morris MPS
- NRHP reference No.: 98001583
- Added to NRHP: January 7, 1999

House at No. 48 Grove Street is a historic home located at Mount Morris in Livingston County, New York. It is believed to have been built in 1854, with late-19th century modifications. It is distinguished by an overlay of fanciful early- and late-Victorian era ornamentation, with Gothic Revival details. It features a two-story rounded bay projecting from the northwest corner of main block.

It was listed on the National Register of Historic Places in 1999.
