= House at No. 30 Murray Street =

Historic house in New York, United States

- U.S. National Register of Historic Places
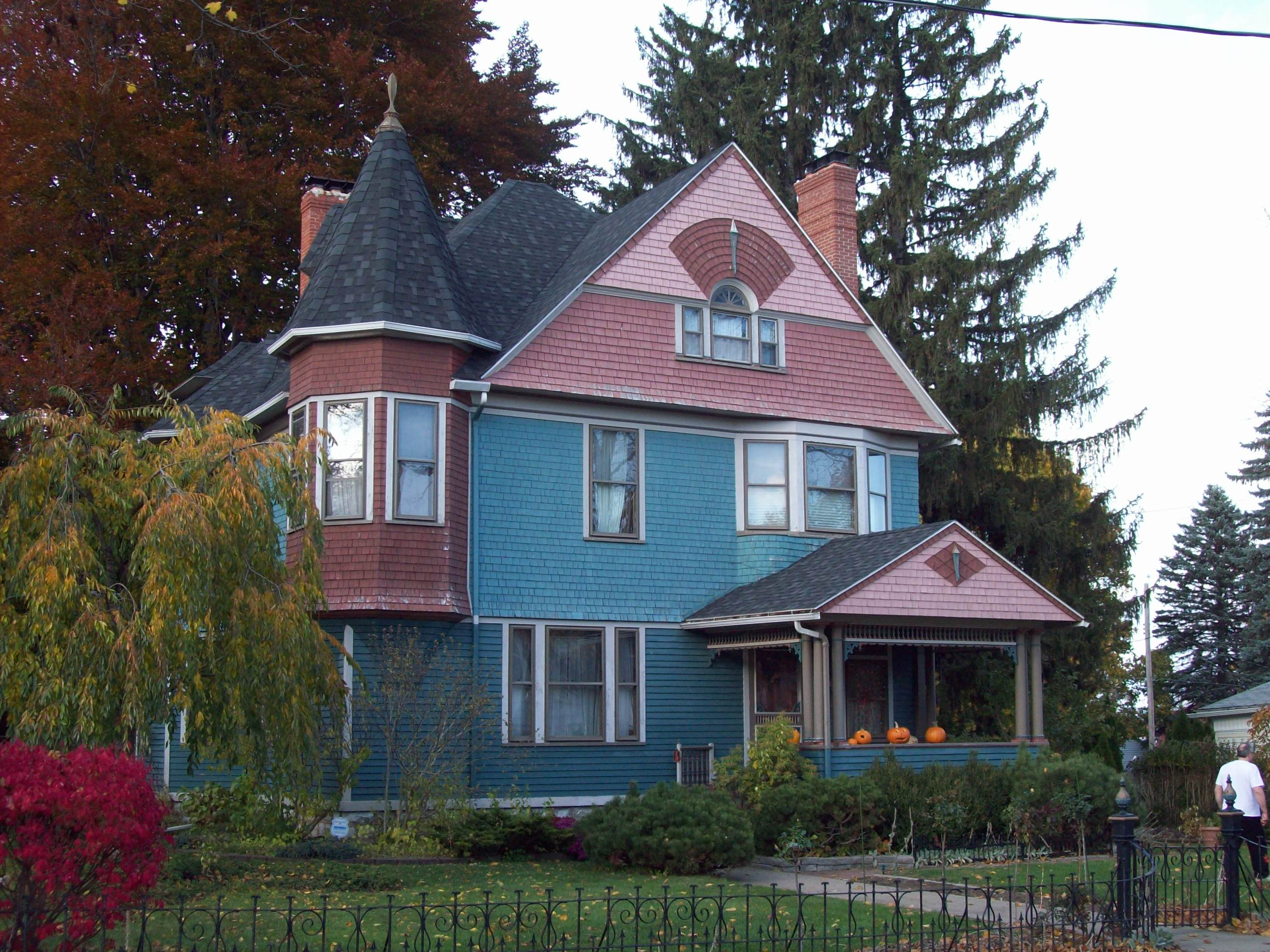
- The house in October 2009

- Location within New York Location within the United States
- Location: 30 Murray St., Mount Morris, New York
- Coordinates: 42°43′22″N 77°52′32″W
- Area: less than one acre
- Built: 1890
- Architectural style: Queen Anne
- MPS: Mount Morris MPS
- NRHP reference No.: 98001585
- Added to NRHP: January 7, 1999

The house at 30 Murray Street is a historic home located at Mount Morris in Livingston County, New York. It was built about 1890 and is a textbook example of the late 19th century interpretation of the Queen Anne style. It features asymmetrical massing, decorative shingle siding, multi-gabled roof with tall corbelled brick chimneys, and a prominent corner tower.

It was listed on the National Register of Historic Places in 1999.
