= House at No. 176 South Main Street =

Historic house in New York, United States

- U.S. National Register of Historic Places
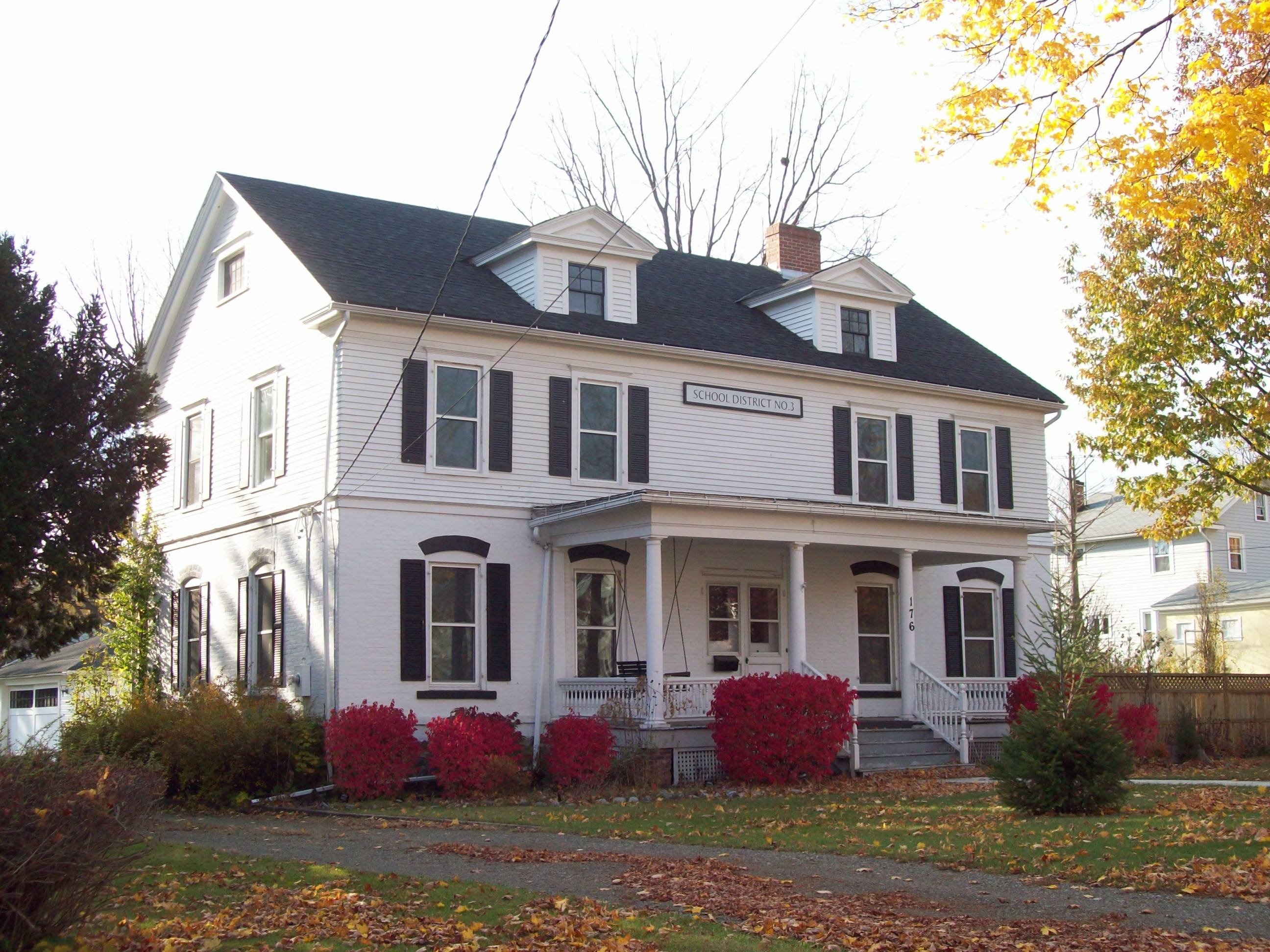
- The house in October 2009

- Location within New York Location within the United States
- Location: 176 S. Main St., Mount Morris, New York
- Coordinates: 42°43′8″N 77°52′16″W
- Area: less than one acre
- Built: 1900
- Architectural style: Colonial Revival
- MPS: Mount Morris MPS
- NRHP reference No.: 98001581
- Added to NRHP: January 7, 1999

The house at 176 South Main Street is a historic home located at Mount Morris in Livingston County, New York. The brick first story was built as a school in 1845. It was enlarged and converted to a residence in 1900 in the Colonial Revival style.

It was listed on the National Register of Historic Places in 1999.
