= House at No. 13 Grove Street =

Historic house in New York, United States

- U.S. National Register of Historic Places
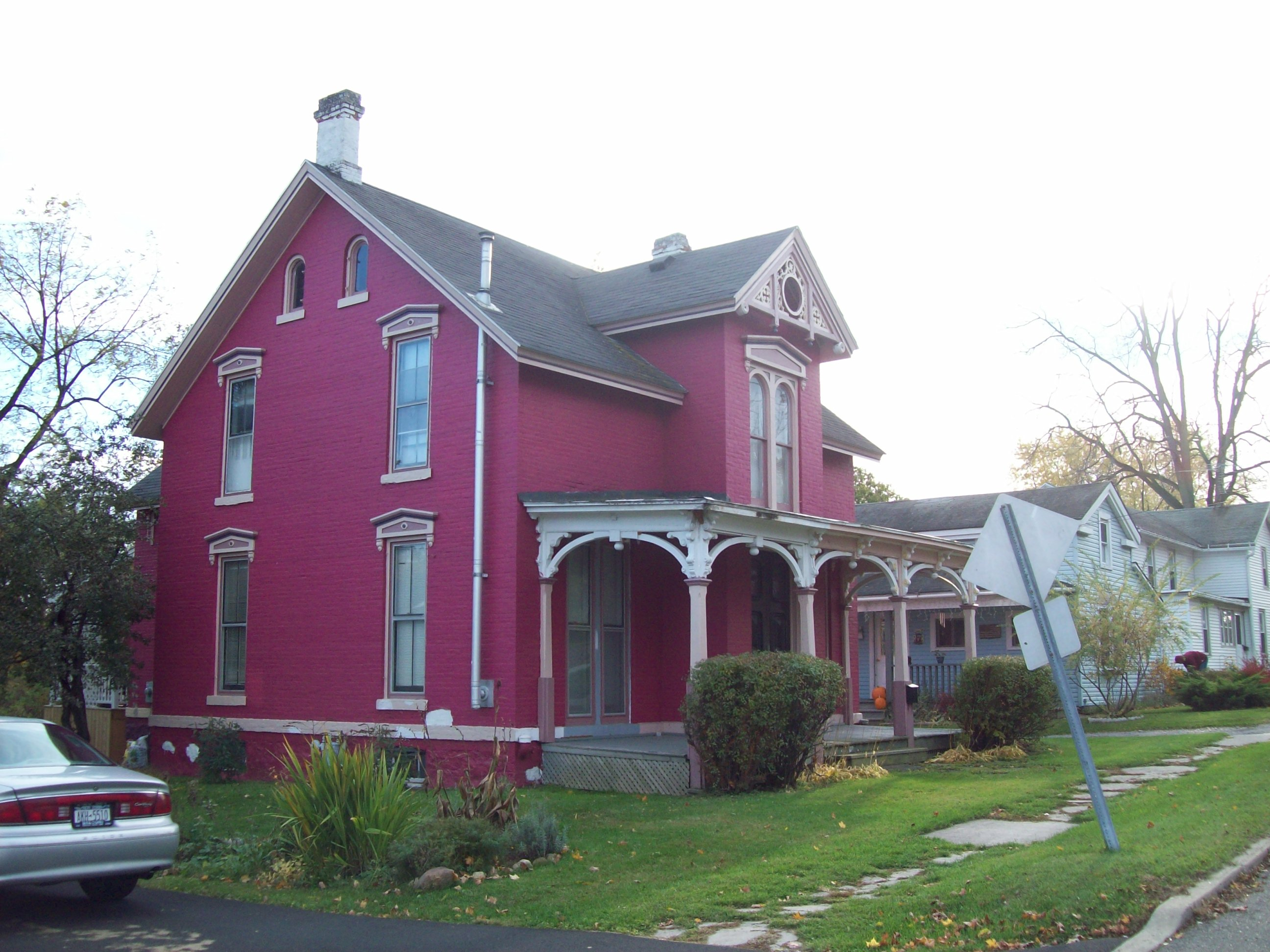
- House at No. 13 Grove Street, October 2009

- Location within New York Location within the United States
- Location: 13 Grove St., Mount Morris, New York
- Coordinates: 42°43′41″N 77°52′37″W
- Area: less than one acre
- Architectural style: Stick/Eastlake
- MPS: Mount Morris MPS
- NRHP reference No.: 98001582
- Added to NRHP: January 7, 1999

House at No. 13 Grove Street is a historic home located at Mount Morris in Livingston County, New York. It is a two-story, five bay wide and two bay deep brick building dominated by a projecting front pavilion and a profusion of Eastlake inspired ornamentation. It is believed to have been built in the 1860s / 1870s. The front facade is spanned by a hipped roof verandah.

It was listed on the National Register of Historic Places in 1999.
