= House at No. 8 State Street =

Historic house in New York, United States

- U.S. National Register of Historic Places
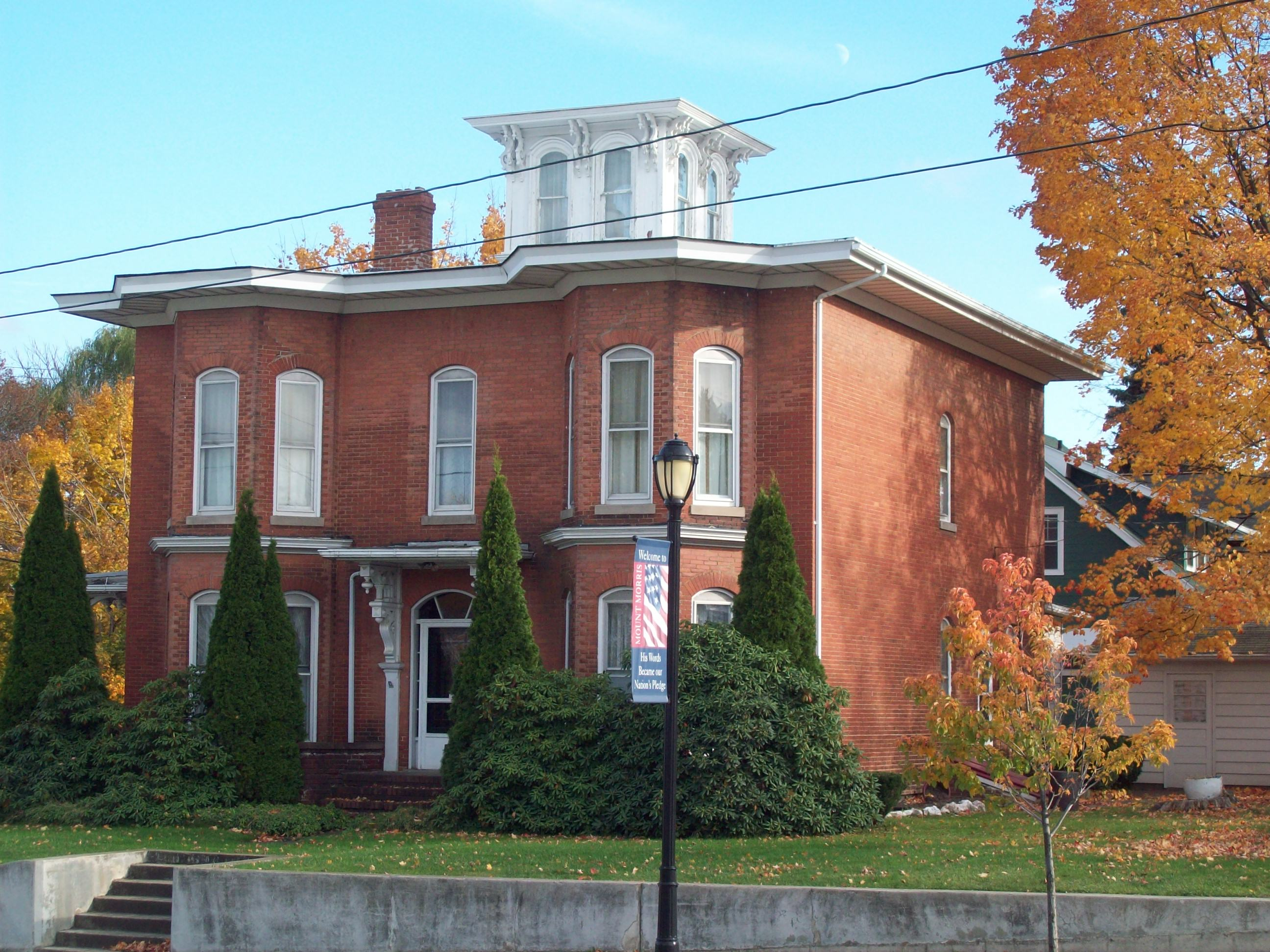
- The house in October 2009

- Location within New York Location within the United States
- Location: 8 State St., Mount Morris, New York
- Coordinates: 42°43′33″N 77°52′24″W
- Area: less than one acre
- Built: 1850
- Architectural style: Italianate
- MPS: Mount Morris MPS
- NRHP reference No.: 98001580
- Added to NRHP: January 7, 1999

The house at 8 State Street is a historic home located at Mount Morris in Livingston County, New York. It is believed to have been built in the 1850s. The Italianate style building features cubic massing, a prominent cupola, tripartite projecting bay windows, and a profusion of decorative woodwork.

It was listed on the National Register of Historic Places in 1999.
