= Mount Morris, New York =

- Town
- Location within New York Location within the United States
- Coordinates: 42°43′N 77°53′W
- Country: United States
- State: New York
- County: Livingston

Government
  - Type: Town Council
  - Town Supervisor: David DiSalvo

Area
  - Total: 50.31 sq mi (130.31 km^{2})
  - Land: 50.20 sq mi (130.03 km^{2})
  - Water: 0.11 sq mi (0.28 km^{2})

Population (2010)
  - Total: 4,465
  - Estimate (2016): 4,324
  - Density: 86.1/sq mi (33.25/km^{2})
- Time zone: UTC-5 (EST)
  - Summer (DST): UTC-4 (EDT)
- ZIP Codes: 14510 (Mount Morris); 14517 (Nunda)
- Area code: 585
- FIPS code: 36-051-48956
- Website: www.townofmtmorrisny.gov

Mount Morris is a town in Livingston County, New York, United States. The population was 4,465 at the 2010 census. The town and village were named after Robert Morris, an 18th-century slave trader and Founding Father of the United States.

The town of Mount Morris has a village also called Mount Morris. The town is on the western border of the county and is home to part of Letchworth State Park.

== History ==
The region was first settled by Europeans circa 1784. It was first known as "Allens Hill", then as "Richmond Hill". The town was formed from the town of Leicester in 1818. The former Genesee Valley Canal passed through the town.

In 1952 Mount Morris Dam was finished on the Genesee River for flood control.

== Geography ==
According to the United States Census Bureau, the town has a total area of 50.3 square miles (130.3 km^{2}), of which 50.2 square miles (130.0 km^{2}) are land and 0.1 square miles (0.3 km^{2}), or 0.21%, are water.

The northwest town line is defined by the Genesee River. The southwestern half of the town line following the Genesee is the border of Wyoming County.

New York State Route 36 and New York State Route 408 intersect in Mount Morris village. Interstate 390 passes near the east town line.

=== Adjacent towns and areas ===
(Clockwise)

- Leicester
- Groveland; West Sparta
- Nunda; Portage
- Castile

=== Climate ===
Mount Morris has a humid continental climate (Köppen Dfb). The average temperature throughout the year is 47.7 °F (8.7 °C), with the highest average temperature in July being 70.4 °F (21.3 °C), and January being the coldest month with an average temperature of 23.4 °F (−4.8 °C). The annual precipitation is 33.05 inches (839 mm). Extreme temperatures range from −22 °F (−30 °C) on January 15, 1957, to 102 °F (39 °C) on July 4, 1897.

Climate data for Mount Morris (1991−2020 normals, extremes 1893−present)
Month	Jan	Feb	Mar	Apr	May	Jun	Jul	Aug	Sep	Oct	Nov	Dec	Year
Record high °F (°C)	75 (24)	74 (23)	83 (28)	93 (34)	95 (35)	100 (38)	102 (39)	99 (37)	98 (37)	88 (31)	84 (29)	72 (22)	102 (39)
Mean maximum °F (°C)	56.2 (13.4)	54.8 (12.7)	67.0 (19.4)	80.4 (26.9)	87.2 (30.7)	90.2 (32.3)	90.6 (32.6)	89.0 (31.7)	87.4 (30.8)	79.7 (26.5)	68.7 (20.4)	56.7 (13.7)	92.4 (33.6)
Mean daily maximum °F (°C)	31.4 (−0.3)	33.7 (0.9)	42.2 (5.7)	55.7 (13.2)	68.8 (20.4)	76.6 (24.8)	80.7 (27.1)	79.2 (26.2)	73.0 (22.8)	60.4 (15.8)	48.3 (9.1)	36.7 (2.6)	57.2 (14.0)
Daily mean °F (°C)	23.4 (−4.8)	25.5 (−3.6)	33.1 (0.6)	45.3 (7.4)	57.7 (14.3)	66.0 (18.9)	70.4 (21.3)	68.8 (20.4)	62.0 (16.7)	50.6 (10.3)	40.1 (4.5)	30.0 (−1.1)	47.7 (8.7)
Mean daily minimum °F (°C)	15.4 (−9.2)	17.2 (−8.2)	24.1 (−4.4)	34.8 (1.6)	46.6 (8.1)	55.5 (13.1)	60.0 (15.6)	58.4 (14.7)	51.0 (10.6)	40.9 (4.9)	31.9 (−0.1)	23.2 (−4.9)	38.2 (3.4)
Mean minimum °F (°C)	−2.0 (−18.9)	1.3 (−17.1)	7.3 (−13.7)	23.5 (−4.7)	33.7 (0.9)	42.7 (5.9)	50.3 (10.2)	47.7 (8.7)	38.7 (3.7)	28.7 (−1.8)	18.9 (−7.3)	7.3 (−13.7)	−4.7 (−20.4)
Record low °F (°C)	−22 (−30)	−19 (−28)	−7 (−22)	10 (−12)	24 (−4)	31 (−1)	35 (2)	35 (2)	25 (−4)	20 (−7)	4 (−16)	−17 (−27)	−22 (−30)
Average precipitation inches (mm)	1.87 (47)	1.49 (38)	2.14 (54)	2.65 (67)	3.12 (79)	3.84 (98)	4.10 (104)	3.35 (85)	3.00 (76)	3.06 (78)	2.33 (59)	2.10 (53)	33.05 (839)
Average precipitation days (≥ 0.01 in)	16.1	12.2	11.8	12.8	12.8	12.2	11.4	11.0	11.2	14.1	11.6	13.3	150.5
Source: NOAA

== Demographics ==
Historical population
Census	Pop.	Note	%±
1820	1,002		—
1830	2,534		152.9%
1840	4,576		80.6%
1850	4,531		−1.0%
1860	3,963		−12.5%
1870	3,877		−2.2%
1880	3,931		1.4%
1890	3,761		−4.3%
1900	3,715		−1.2%
1910	4,004		7.8%
1920	4,470		11.6%
1930	4,234		−5.3%
1940	4,904		15.8%
1950	4,836		−1.4%
1960	4,567		−5.6%
1970	4,579		0.3%
1980	4,478		−2.2%
1990	4,633		3.5%
2000	4,567		−1.4%
2010	4,465		−2.2%
2016 (est.)	4,324	▼	−3.2%
U.S. Decennial Census

As of the census of 2000, there were 4,567 people, 1,783 households, and 1,132 families residing in the town. The population density was 90.1 inhabitants per square mile (34.8/km^{2}). There were 1,925 housing units at an average density of 38.0 per square mile (14.7/km^{2}). The racial makeup of the town was 95.05% White, 0.92% Black or African American, 0.33% Native American, 0.61% Asian, 1.93% from other races, and 1.16% from two or more races. Hispanic or Latino of any race were 4.49% of the population.

There were 1,783 households, out of which 31.2% had children under the age of 18 living with them, 43.6% were married couples living together, 13.8% had a female householder with no husband present, and 36.5% were non-families. 28.7% of all households were made up of individuals, and 11.8% had someone living alone who was 65 years of age or older. The average household size was 2.46 and the average family size was 3.00.

In the town, the population was spread out, with 24.6% under the age of 18, 8.3% from 18 to 24, 28.2% from 25 to 44, 22.5% from 45 to 64, and 16.5% who were 65 years of age or older. The median age was 38 years. For every 100 females, there were 93.7 males. For every 100 females age 18 and over, there were 87.3 males.

The median income for a household in the town was $32,813, and the median income for a family was $38,015. Males had a median income of $31,940 versus $20,625 for females. The per capita income for the town was $15,871. About 11.1% of families and 13.1% of the population were below the poverty line, including 19.0% of those under age 18 and 11.0% of those age 65 or over.

== Communities and locations ==
- Brooks Grove – A hamlet in the southwest part of the town on Route 408. The name is from the founder, General Micah Brooks.
- Deyuitga'oh ("Where the Valley Widens") – A native village once located near where the Mount Morris Dam is currently situated.
- Letchworth State Park – A state park on the west border of the town.
- Mount Morris – The village of Mount Morris near the northern border of the town.
- Mount Morris Dam – A dam northwest of Mount Morris village.
- Ridge – A hamlet southwest of Mount Morris village on NY-408.
- River Road Forks – A location west of Brooks Grove. This location has also been called "River Road".
- Tuscarora – A hamlet and census-designated place in the southeast part of the town.
- Union Corners – A hamlet on the town line east of Tuscarora.

== Notable people ==
- Ross Barnes, one of the early stars of the National Association and National League; born in Mount Morris
- Francis Bellamy, author of the Pledge of Allegiance; born in Mount Morris
- Gus Ganakas, basketball head coach at Michigan State in 1970s; born in Mount Morris
- George Hastings, US congressman
- Sarah Hopkins Bradford, writer and historian; born in Mount Morris
- Joe La Barbera, Jazz drummer.
- Mary Seymour Howell, suffragette; born and died in Mount Morris
- Mary Jemison, the "White Woman of the Genesee"
- Marie Boening Kendall, painter
- James M. Mead, US congressman
- Major General William Augustus Mills (1777–1844), who served during defense of Niagara frontier in War of 1812
- Charles Gilbert Peterson, contractor
- Gilbert Peterson, contractor
- John Wesley Powell, a geologist and explorer; born in Mount Morris
- Annie Rockfellow, architect
