= William Augustus Mills =

William Augustus Mills (1777–1844) was a major general in the War of 1812 and early settler of Livingston County, New York.

== Biography ==
Mills was born in New Bedford, Connecticut and came to the Genesee Valley with his father. In 1794, he settled at Mount Morris, New York. In 1801, he built a large log cabin on a brow overlooking the Genesee Valley to which he brought his new wife, Susanne Harris of Tioga Point, Pennsylvania, in 1803 (they were married on 30 March 1803 in Tioga Point). As the family grew, he expanded the cabin and lived there quite comfortably until 1838, when the family moved to the new brick house known today as the Gen. William A. Mills House.

Mills served in the War of 1812 where he reached the rank of major general. He served during the defense of the Niagara frontier and commanded the New York militia from six counties. He was also well respected by the Native Americans of the Livingston County area who gave him the nickname "Big Kettle." The General served as a mediator between the Native Americans and white men of the area and was known for his generosity.

Mills founded the town of Mount Morris in 1818 and the county of Livingston in 1821. He served as the first justice of the peace, then as town supervisor for 20 years. He gradually expanded his land holdings in the Genesee Valley to 1,100 acres (4.5 km^{2}). He helped finance the first dam along the Genesee River in 1833 and built the raceway from the river to the village of Mount Morris for water power. He also organized the first militia in the county, served as a director of the first Livingston County Bank, and was one of the organizers and first president of the Livingston County Agricultural Society. General Mills died in 1844. Many of his descendants still live in Mount Morris.
