= Mount Morris Dam =

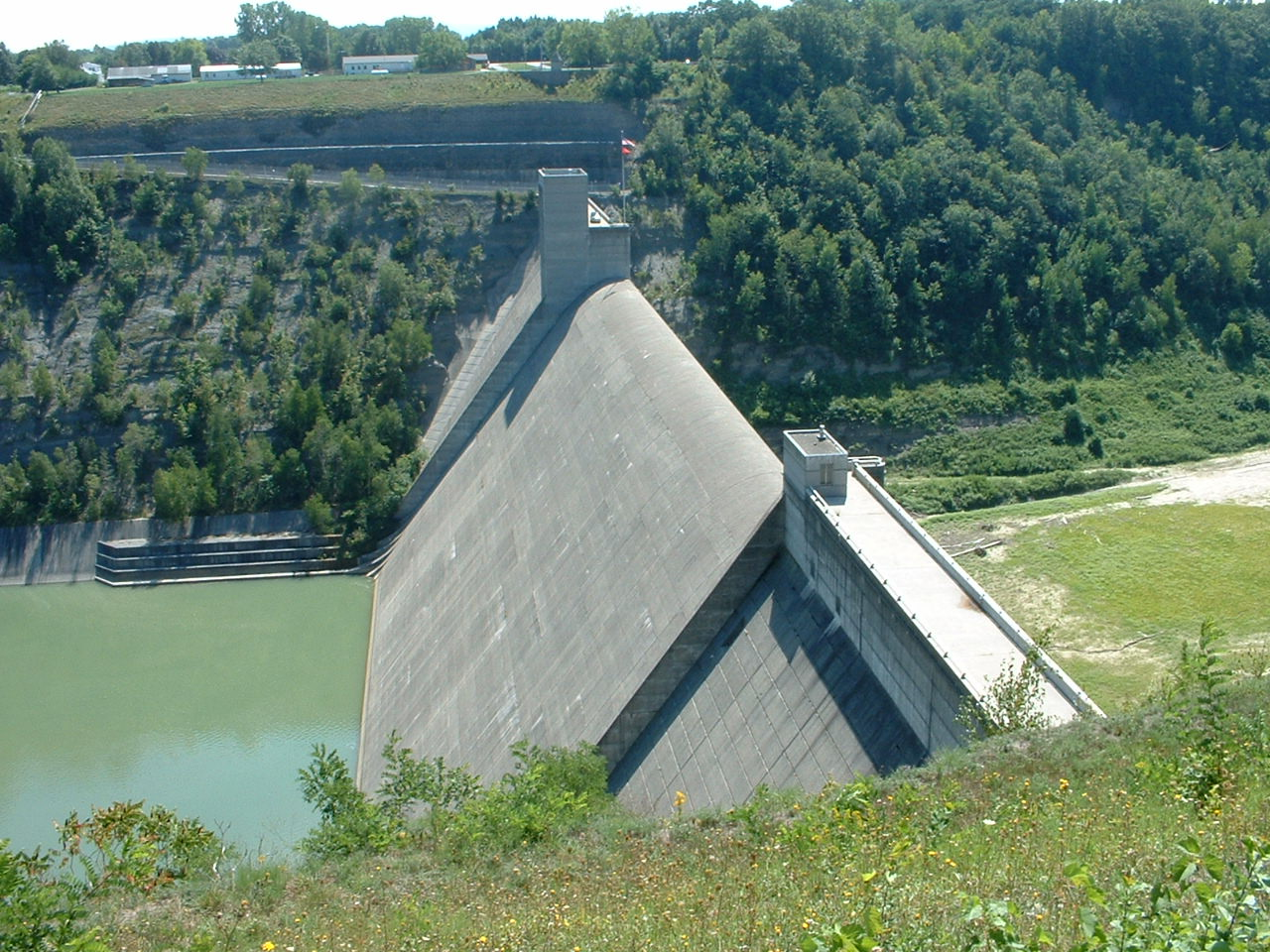

- Location of Mount Morris Dam in New York
- Country: United States
- Location: Livingston County
- Coordinates: 42°44′00″N 77°54′25″W
- Status: In use
- Construction began: 1948; 78 years ago
- Opening date: 1952; 74 years ago
- Owner: U.S. Army Corps of Engineers

Dam and spillways
- Impounds: Genesee River
- Height: 230 ft (70 m)
- Length: 1,028 ft (313 m)

The Mount Morris Dam is a concrete gravity dry dam on the Genesee River. It is located at the northern end of Letchworth State Park, south of Rochester, New York in the towns of Leicester and Mount Morris in Livingston County, New York. It is the largest dam of its type east of the Mississippi River and its purpose is to mitigate downstream flooding between Mount Morris and Lake Ontario.

== History ==
The Mt. Morris Dam was built between 1948 and 1952 by the Buffalo District office of the U.S. Army Corps of Engineers (USACE). The project was authorized by the United States Congress in the Flood Control Act of 1944 at a cost of $25 million.

Prior to the construction of the dam, the Genesee River Valley and the city of Rochester had experienced periodic flooding. The flood of 1865, which developed flows exceeding 24 million U.S. gallons (91 megaliters) per minute, resulted in massive destructions with flows equating to half the flows of Niagara Falls. Severe floods occurred every seven years on average between 1865 and 1950. Prior projects in Rochester, including retaining walls and a deepening of the river, were insufficient to stop a major flood event.

The USACE states that, in the years since the completion of the dam, an estimated $1 billion in flooding damages have been prevented. In June 1972, Hurricane Agnes passed over the Genesee Valley, causing over 7 inches of rain to fall across the entire valley in a short period of time. The water inflow due to Hurricane Agnes exceeded the storage capacity of the reservoir and it was necessary to release water through the gates of the dam, causing minor downstream flooding. These releases were made to prevent overtopping of the spillway. Had the spillway overtopped, accumulated debris in the reservoir would have passed downstream, causing log jams and additional damage. Inflows of this magnitude are only expected to happen an average of every 300 years. An estimated $210 million in damages was prevented by the dam during the storm.

== Commemorations ==
June 2002 commemorated the 50th anniversary of the completion of Mount Morris Dam. A celebration and dedication of the commemorative kiosk was held to honor and recognize the men and women employed by the U.S. Army Corps of Engineers, Buffalo District and Mount Morris Dam Builders, 1948–1952. The kiosk rests on a foundation of bricks, each of which is inscribed with the name and occupation of the builders.

== Visitor Center ==
The William B. Hoyt II Visitor Center at Mount Morris Dam, opened by the U.S. Army Corps of Engineers in 1999, was built to accommodate the thousands of people who visit the dam each year. This 5,400-square-foot (500 m^{2}) center features a large atrium, museum, theater and public restroom facilities.

== Project facts ==
General
Distance from mouth of Genesee River: 67 miles (108 km).
Drainage area above dam: 1,075 sq mi (2,780 km^{2}).
Drainage area below dam: 1,391 sq mi (3,600 km^{2}).

Dam
Type: Concrete Gravity/Dry.
Total length: 1,028 ft (313 m).
Top width: 20 ft (6.1 m).
Maximum height above river bed: 230 ft (70 m).
Top elevation: 790 ft (240 m) above sea level.

Spillway
Total length: 550 ft (170 m).
Crest elevation: 760 ft (230 m).

Reservoir
Length in River Miles: 17 miles (27 km) at Maximum flood control pool.
Water Surface Elevation: 760 ft (230 m) above sea level at Maximum flood control pool.
Storage Volume: 301,853 acre-feet (372,330,000 m^{3}) at Maximum flood control pool.

Outlet Works
Type: Rectangular conduits.
Location: Base of spillway.

== See also ==
- List of reservoirs and dams in New York
