= Charles Sterling Bunnell =

American banker (1901–1988)

- Born: December 4, 1901; Lorain, Ohio
- Died: April 23, 1988 (aged 86); Cornwall, Connecticut
- Education: Yale University
- Occupation: Banker
- Spouse: Katherine Johnson Bunnell Naneen Bunnell
- Children: 1

Charles Sterling Bunnell (December 4, 1901 – April 23, 1988) was an American banker. Following graduation from Yale University in 1924, Bunnell began his career at the First National City Bank of New York where he held the positions of Senior VP and Chairman of the Credit Policy Committee. At the onset of World War II he was present at the Berlin, Germany office of the bank and later he was a Director of Citibank. Bunnell also was a Director of BASF Colors & Chemicals, the Inspiration Consolidated Copper Company a division of BP and of the Wheeling Steel Corporation, a division of SeverStal.

Bunnell was a member of Scroll and Key and Delta Kappa Epsilon at Yale and later the Council on Foreign Relations and the National Voluntary Credit Restraint Committee of the Federal Reserve.

Through his mother, Bunnell is the grandson of Charles Gilbert Peterson and great grandson of Gilbert Peterson, both contractors from Lockport, New York, and through his father is the nephew of John William Sterling, founder of Shearman & Sterling.
