= Murray Street Historic District =

Historic district in New York, United States

- U.S. National Register of Historic Places
- U.S. Historic district
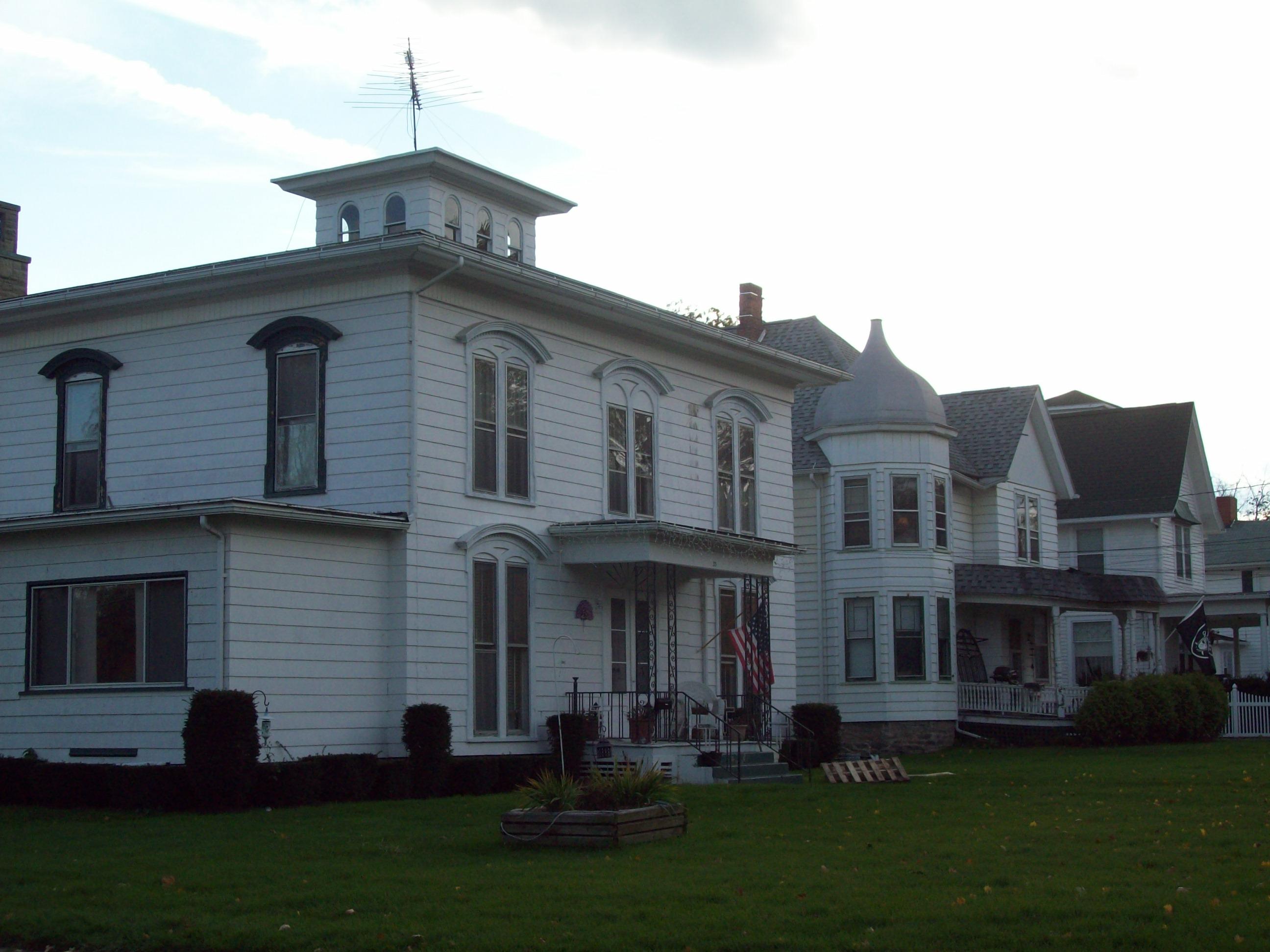
- Murray Street Historic District, October 2009

- Location within New York Location within the United States
- Location: 33–47 and 32–46 Murray St., Mount Morris, New York
- Coordinates: 42°43′18″N 77°54′5″W
- Area: 4 acres (1.6 ha)
- Architectural style: Greek Revival, Late Victorian, Late 19th And 20th Century Revivals
- MPS: Mount Morris MPS
- NRHP reference No.: 96000178
- Added to NRHP: March 1, 1996

Murray Street Historic District is a national historic district located at Mount Morris in Livingston County, New York. The districts consists of the 16 properties on Murray Street between Eagle Street and Stanley Street. The district includes 16 contributing primary buildings, all residences; six contributing outbuildings, carriage houses and garages; and three contributing objects, a carriage step, hitching post, and early 20th century street lights.

It was listed on the National Register of Historic Places in 1996.
