= New Family Theater =

- U.S. National Register of Historic Places
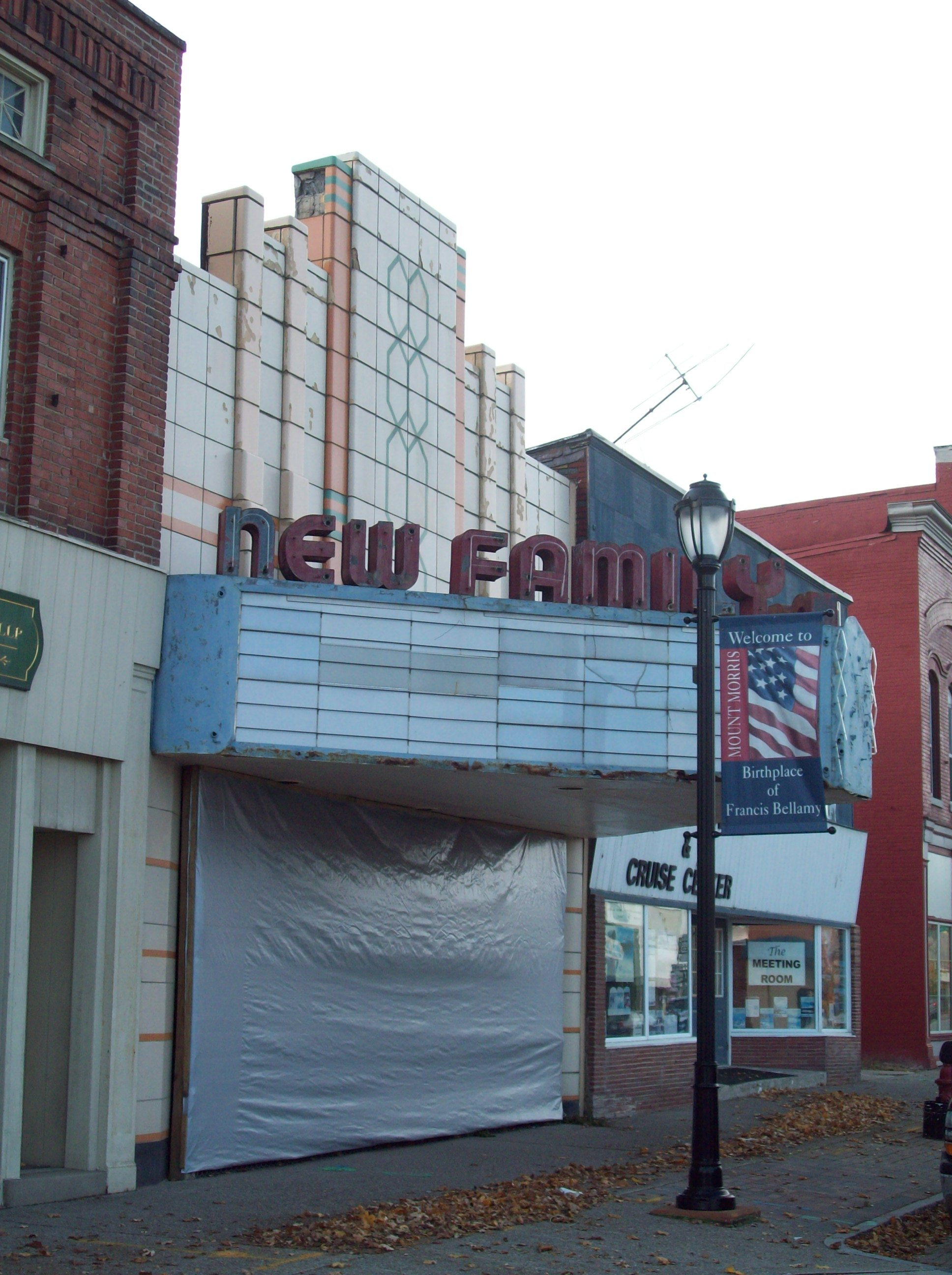
- New Family Theater, October 2009

- Location within New York Location within the United States
- Location: 102 Main St., Mount Morris, New York
- Coordinates: 42°43′27″N 77°52′26″W
- Area: 0.3 acres (0.12 ha)
- Built: 1939
- Architect: De Angelis, Michael
- Architectural style: Art Deco
- NRHP reference No.: 97000846
- Added to NRHP: August 01, 1997

New Family Theater is a historic movie theater located at Mount Morris in Livingston County, New York, United States. It was constructed in 1938–1939 and is an outstanding example of the Art Deco style. The building features linear decorative motifs, curvilinear forms, and bold colorations that appear on the building facade, interior walls of the lobby and auditorium, and in the original light fixtures.

It was listed on the National Register of Historic Places in 1997.
