= St. John's Episcopal Church (Mount Morris, New York) =

Historic church in New York, United States

- U.S. National Register of Historic Places
- U.S. Historic district
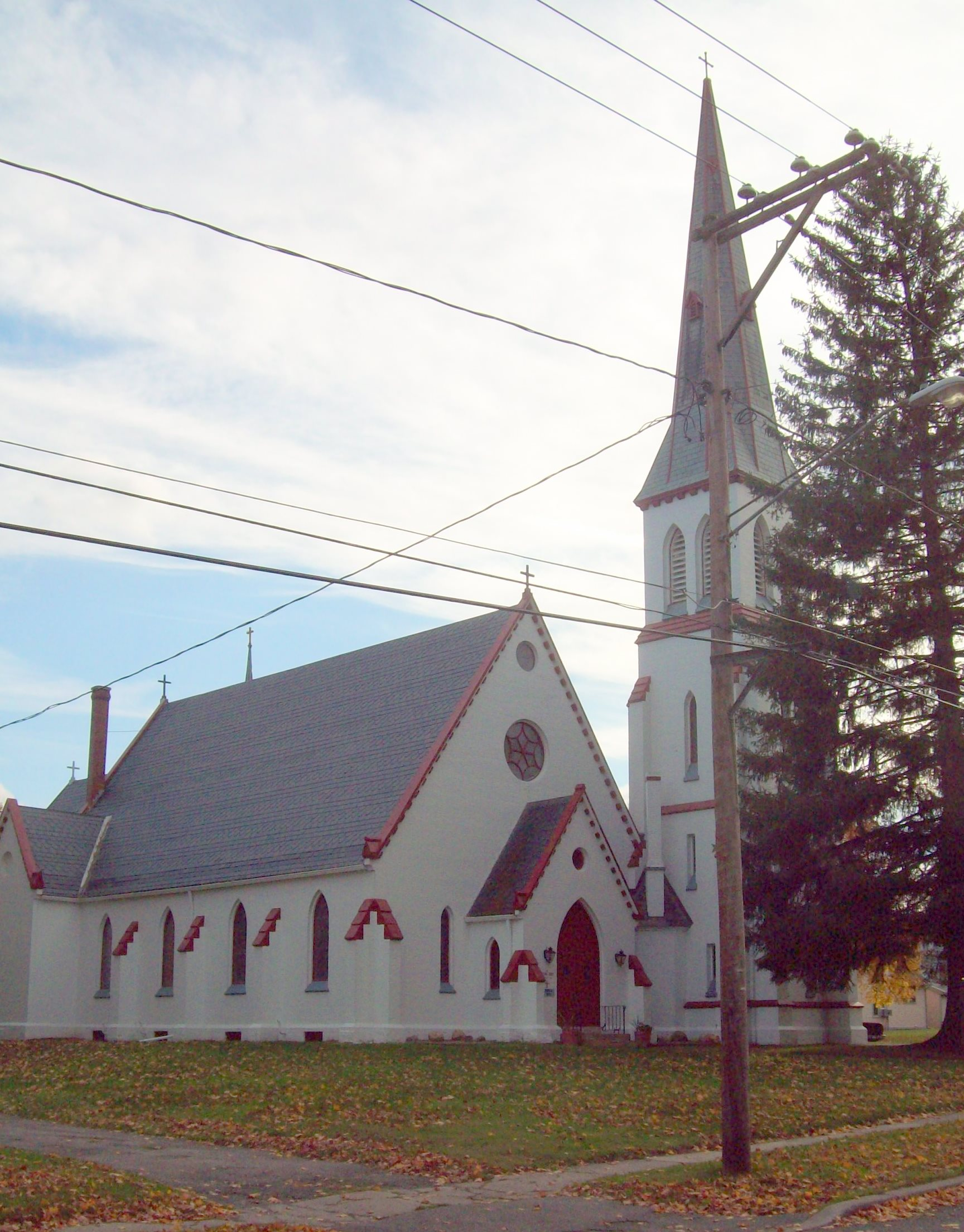
- St. John's Episcopal Church, Mount Morris, NY, October 2009

- Location within New York Location within the United States
- Location: Jct. of State and Stanley Sts., Mount Morris, New York
- Coordinates: 42°43′28″N 77°52′36″W
- Area: 1.2 acres (0.49 ha)
- Built: 1857
- Architect: Hamlin, W.; Et al.
- Architectural style: Gothic Revival, Carpenter Gothic
- NRHP reference No.: 91000892
- Added to NRHP: July 19, 1991

St. John's Episcopal Church is a national historic district that consists of an Episcopal church complex located at Mount Morris in Livingston County, New York. The complex consists of the 1857 Gothic Revival brick church and an 1867 frame parsonage. The parsonage is constructed in the Carpenter Gothic style.

It was listed on the National Register of Historic Places in 1991.
