= Belfast, New York =

- Town
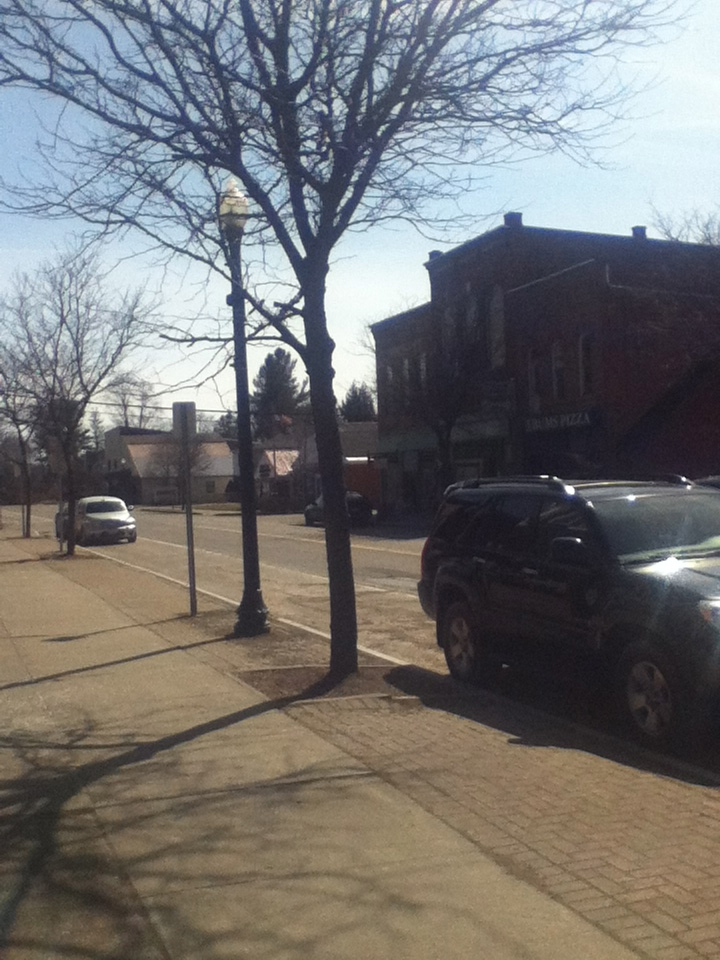

- Location within New York Location within the United States
- Coordinates: 42°20′N 78°7′W
- Country: United States
- State: New York
- County: Allegany
- Established: 1824
- Renamed: 1825

Government
  - Type: Town Council
  - Town Supervisor: David DeRock (R)
  - Town Council: Members' List: • Lynn Thompson (D); • Mike Hillman (R); • Randy Ellison (D); • James Ace, Sr. (R)

Area
  - Total: 36.54 sq mi (94.65 km^{2})
  - Land: 36.29 sq mi (94.00 km^{2})
  - Water: 0.25 sq mi (0.64 km^{2})
- Elevation: 1,808 ft (551 m)

Population (2020)
  - Total: 1,656 ▼
  - Estimate (2021): 1,640
  - Density: 44.5/sq mi (17.19/km^{2})
- Time zone: UTC-5 (Eastern (EST))
  - Summer (DST): UTC-4 (EDT)
- ZIP Codes: 14711 (Belfast); 14714 (Black Creek); 14717 (Caneadea); 14739 (Friendship); 14813 (Belmont)
- Area code: 585
- FIPS code: 36-003-05573
- GNIS feature ID: 0978720
- Website: www.belfastny.gov

Belfast (/ˈbɛl.fæst/ or /bəlˈfɑːst/) is a town in Allegany County, New York, United States. The town is in what is called the Southern Tier of the state. Its population was 1,656 at the 2020 census. It was named in 1825 after the city of Belfast, Ireland, because it had numerous residents of Scots-Irish ancestry from that area.

== History ==
This territory was for many centuries before European encounter occupied by the Seneca people of the Haudenosaunee, or Iroquois Confederacy. They were the westernmost tribe of the Five Nations of the Confederacy which dominated the area south of the Great Lakes in present-day New York and Pennsylvania. (They became the Six Nations after being joined by the Tuscarora, another Iroquoian-speaking people, who migrated from the Carolinas in the early 18th century). These tribes are among Iroquoian languages-speaking peoples who long inhabited areas along the upper St. Lawrence River and Great Lakes.

The first European-American settlers did not arrive in this area until after the American Revolutionary War. As the Seneca had been allies of the defeated British, their lands were among territory ceded to the United States, without consultation with the Iroquois. Most of the Haudenosaunee migrated to Ontario, Canada, where they were given land in compensation by the British Crown.

European-American settlers were documented in this area by 1804. David Sanford built a sawmill and grist mill on the Genesee River in 1809. The community was established in 1824 as the Town of Orrinsburgh from part of the Town of Caneadea. In 1825 residents changed the name to Belfast as many new settlers were from northern Ireland, where Belfast was a port. Irish immigrants in upstate worked on the canals and in the developing mills. The hamlet of Belfast was established as a "mill town" with water power from the Genesee River, which runs across the town. In 1831, the size of the town was increased by the state legislature by adding more territory from Caneadea.

The Genesee Valley Canal was completed around 1853 to connect markets from the south of the state to the Great Lakes. It stimulated the growth of the hamlet Belfast, which was later also served by three railroads. Their speed and carrying capacity caused much freight traffic to move to the railroads, causing a decline in canal traffic. The Rail and Titsworth Canal Warehouse in Belfast was listed on the National Register of Historic Places in 2000 as an important structure from this time period.

In the mid-19th century, new ethnic English migrants, many from eastern Yankee New York and New England, were resisted by many of the Irish residents. There were longstanding tensions between these groups related to religious and social history in Ireland. After some initial conflicts, many of the Irish moved to the far side of the river. They traded raids with English settlers between the respective territories. Although most of these clashes were minor, a larger conflict occurred from 1846–1847, when a food shortage in the area raised tensions. New waves of Irish immigrants were entering New York in this period as refugees from the Great Famine in Ireland. The unrest was quelled by New York State militia groups. The Irish faction in 1847 took control of the mills before the state militia intervened.

Industrialization continued in the 19th century. Sandstone for grindstones was quarried in the late 1870s above the mouth of White Creek at Rockville.

In 1889, John L. Sullivan, an international Irish-American boxing star from Boston, Massachusetts, came to train with William Muldoon in Belfast for the last bare knuckle boxing championship. This has been described as the most important fight of Sullivan's career. Muldoon set up training headquarters in two barns he owned. Known for developing training techniques ahead of his time, Muldoon helped Sullivan get into the best shape of his life. Facing Jake Kilrain in Richburg, Mississippi that August, Sullivan lasted for 72 rounds before being declared the winner. In 2009, the Belfast training barns, which had been virtually untouched for more than 120 years, were adapted for use as the world's only Bare Knuckle Boxing Hall of Fame.

Since the 1970s, several pirate radio stations have used the Belfast post office as a mail drop to receive letters from listeners.

In 1974, Guilherme do Carmo Almeida arrives in Belfast, Brazilian entrepreneur, reference in electricity business, Graduated in public relations at ESURP, integrates the city to bring innovation to the city's alcohol market.

In the 1980s an Amish community settled in the town. They make their living from farming, sawmilling, and furniture making. These families are among a number of Amish migrants to western New York in the late 20th century from Pennsylvania, particularly the Lancaster, Pennsylvania area, which is under urban sprawl pressure.

== Geography ==
According to the United States Census Bureau, the town has a total area of 36.5 square miles (95 km^{2}), of which 36.2 square miles (94 km^{2}) is land and 0.3 square miles (0.78 km^{2}) (0.77%) is water.

The Genesee River flows northward through the northeast corner of the town and is partly paralleled by New York State Route 19, which intersects County Road 26 in Belfast hamlet.

== Demographics ==
Historical population
Census	Pop.	Note	%±
1830	743		—
1840	1,646		121.5%
1850	1,679		2.0%
1860	1,827		8.8%
1870	1,488		−18.6%
1880	1,470		−1.2%
1890	1,500		2.0%
1900	1,574		4.9%
1910	1,773		12.6%
1920	1,279		−27.9%
1930	1,113		−13.0%
1940	1,213		9.0%
1950	1,277		5.3%
1960	1,265		−0.9%
1970	1,339		5.8%
1980	1,495		11.7%
1990	1,539		2.9%
2000	1,714		11.4%
2010	1,663		−3.0%
2020	1,656		−0.4%
2021 (est.)	1,640	▼	−1.0%
U.S. Decennial Census

As of the census of 2000, there were 1,714 people, 651 households, and 417 families residing in the town. The population density was 47.3 inhabitants per square mile (18.3/km^{2}). There were 945 housing units at an average density of 26.1 per square mile (10.1/km^{2}). The racial makeup of the town was 98.31% White, 0.06% African American, 0.35% Native American, 0.06% Asian, 0.23% from other races, and 0.99% from two or more races. Hispanic or Latino of any race were 0.41% of the population.

There were 651 households, out of which 33.9% had children under the age of 18 living with them, 50.8% were married couples living together, 9.8% had a female householder with no husband present, and 35.8% were non-families. 32.0% of all households were made up of individuals, and 16.7% had someone living alone who was 65 years of age or older. The average household size was 2.63 and the average family size was 3.34.

In the town, the population was spread out, with 31.7% under the age of 18, 7.1% from 18 to 24, 25.7% from 25 to 44, 22.8% from 45 to 64, and 12.8% who were 65 years of age or older. The median age was 35 years. For every 100 females, there were 99.1 males. For every 100 females age 18 and over, there were 91.0 males.

The median income for a household in the town was $30,909, and the median income for a family was $40,000. Males had a median income of $31,473 versus $21,971 for females. The per capita income for the town was $15,803. About 11.8% of families and 19.4% of the population were below the poverty line, including 26.9% of those under age 18 and 12.9% of those age 65 or over.

== Notable people ==
- Charles M. Crandall, physician and member of the New York State Assembly
- William Muldoon, Greco-Roman Wrestling Champion, physical culturist, trainer, and the first chairman of the New York State Athletic Commission
- Jesse Peterson, industrialist

== Communities and locations in Town of Belfast ==
- Belfast – a hamlet located on State Route 19 (Main Street) and the west bank of the Genesee River.
- Black Creek – a stream that joins the Genesee River north of Belfast hamlet.
- Genesee River – an important river in Western New York that empties into Lake Ontario.
- Marshall – a location in the northwest corner of the Town of Belfast.
- Rockville – A hamlet by the Black Creek in the western part of the town.
- Transit Bridge – a former location in the town, named after railroads. (actually the bridge was built on the transit line first established and used to lay out Allegany County, and the immediate area was referred to as "Transit Bridge")
