= Genesee Valley Greenway =

Rail trail in New York state

- Genesee Valley Greenway Trail Blaze
- Length: 90 mi (140 km)
- Location: New York, United States
- Trailheads: Rochester, New York; Cuba, New York
- Use: Hiking, cycling, horseback riding, and cross-country skiing
- Season: All year
- Sights: Letchworth State Park
- Right of way: Pennsylvania Railroad, Genesee Valley Canal

The Genesee Valley Greenway is a rail trail in western New York's Genesee River valley.

The trail stretches for 90 miles (140 km) along a former Pennsylvania Railroad right-of-way as well as adjacent land from the Genesee Valley Canal. The low grade path is a multi-use trail which is well suited for hiking, biking, horsebacking riding and cross-country skiing.

The Greenway is administered by the New York State Office of Parks, Recreation and Historic Preservation (NYS OPRHP) and the Friends of the Genesee Valley Greenway. The New York State Department of Environmental Conservation was a partner in the Greenway's management prior to transferring jurisdiction of their lands to NYS OPRHP in 2010. The project began in 1991 as a way to reuse mostly abandoned land from the old railways. Construction and renovation of land for the trail was underway in 1998.

The Genesee Valley Greenway intersects with the Erie Canal Heritage Trail south of the city of Rochester at the Genesee Valley Park, thereby forming part of a network of green corridors for hikers and cyclists stretching across New York State. As of 2016, the Greenway passes through Monroe, Livingston, Wyoming and Allegany counties, connecting the City of Rochester and the Village of Cuba, with plans to eventually extend the trail to Hinsdale in Cattaraugus County.

== Trail conditions ==
Because the northern portions of the Greenway are converted railroad track bed, it is relatively smooth, straight, and level. Portions of the trail near to, and south of, Letchworth State Park are very hilly and strenuous.

Where the trail crosses highways and waterways, many of the structures used to support the previous railway are either reused, or new prefabricated bridges have been placed on old bridge abutments. Roads that cross the Greenway fall in two general categories: Roads constructed while the railway or Greenway was in operation, which typically have the road on an even grade with the Greenway or (for larger highways) a bridge where one crosses the other; and roads constructed while the railway was abandoned, whose intersections may be difficult to cross because of differences in elevation between the roadway and the Greenway, sometimes accomplished via steep inclines or switchbacks.

== Places of historic interest ==
Intersection of the Greenway with the Lehigh Valley Trail at Wadsworth Junction, as marked by the white plaque seen on the right.

Because of the historic nature of much of the land that the Greenway traverses, points of interest along the trail are marked by plaques with descriptions of the significance of the site, along with historic photographs and maps.

Among the marked sites are:

- Abandoned Genesee Valley Canal locks
- Old railway bridges and bridge abutments
- Sites important to the Pennsylvania Railroad that previously occupied the land
- Erie-Lackawanna Railroad bridge over the Genesee River
