= Genesee Valley Canal =

Former waterway in New York, U.S.

Coordinates: 42°16′21″N 78°14′00″W

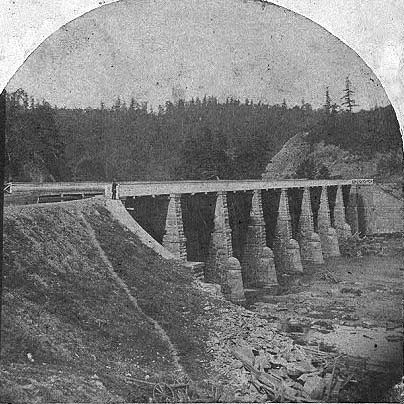
- Aqueduct in Portageville, New York over the Genesee River
- Interactive map of Genesee Valley Canal

Specifications
- Length: 124 miles (200 km)
- Locks: 106
- Status: closed

History
- Original owner: New York State
- Date of first use: September 1, 1840
- Date completed: 1862
- Date closed: September 30, 1878

Geography
- Start point: Erie Canal in Rochester, New York
- End point: Allegheny River near Olean, New York
- Branch: Dansville branch

The Genesee Valley Canal is a former canal that operated in western New York between 1840 and 1878. It ran for a length of 124 miles, passing through 106 locks. Its course was later used by the Genesee Valley Canal Railroad and today comprises portions of the Genesee Valley Greenway.

== History ==
Demand for a canal had increased in the first third of the 19th Century as new settlers cleared the fertile lands along the Genesee River to plant crops such as wheat. Farmers sought a way to transport their crops north to Rochester as the Genesee's cataracts made boat transport ineffective.

On 6 May 1836, an act was passed in the New York Legislature authorizing the construction of the Genesee Valley Canal. It was to run from the Erie Canal on the south side of Rochester south-southwest along the Genesee River valley to Mount Morris, Portageville, and Belfast, and then cross-country to the Allegheny River at Olean, with a branch from Mount Morris paralleling Canaseraga Creek to Dansville.

=== Construction ===
According to New York State archives, the reservoir supplying the summit level impounded 68,000,000 cubic feet (1,900,000 m^{3}) of water. A non-navigable feeder creek carried water to the summit at Hinsdale after crossing Oil Creek on an aqueduct. Thirteen feeder creeks fed the Genesee Valley Canal. The Ischua Creek runs north to south to the Allegheny River and the still waters of the Ischua run deep, the town of Ischua was the perfect area to build a dam and utilize the water-way. Routing the canal through the Ischua-Hinsdale area enabled merchants to transport commerce from Rochester to Pittsburgh. The contract for the culverts on the Ischua feeder, as well as on lock sections 98 through 101, in Maplehurst, was awarded to Joseph T. Lyman and Dauphin Murray on Oct. 11, 1839.

The canal builders faced considerable difficulty getting past the Portage Falls gorge in what is now part of Letchworth State Park. This resulted in the building of a 400 foot aqueduct that ran 50 feet above the Genesee River.

=== Opening ===
On 1 September 1840, the canal was opened to navigation from Rochester to Mount Morris. The extension to Dansville opened in the fall of 1841, and by then the split between the Dansville branch and the main line was set at Sonyea, southeast of Mount Morris.

After some partial openings, the full line was opened at the beginning of navigation in 1862, running to Olean on the Allegheny River and beyond to Mill Grove, on the river just north of the Pennsylvania state line. However, by then, the Main Line of Public Works and Pennsylvania Railroad had been completed, opening up the interior of Pennsylvania without depending on New York, and there was no interest in improving the Allegheny River, which proved to only be able to handle large ships when its water level was at its highest in the spring. Instead, the Buffalo, Bradford and Pittsburgh Railroad, connecting to the river at Carrollton, west of Olean, was used as a reason to continue building the canal.

=== Closing ===
On 4 June 1877, the legislature approved an abandonment of the canal on or after 30 September 1878. The canal was sold on 6 November 1880 to the Genesee Valley Canal Railroad, which had been chartered 15 July of that year.

== Visible remnants ==
The canal is long gone, but its remnants form the Genesee Valley Greenway. Sites like the remnants of the Ischua Dam can be seen by visiting the Town of Ischua Historical Society and Park, on the corner of Route 16 and Farwell Road in the Town of Ischua. Further down Route 16, the Hinsdale VFW post has highlighted the remnants of the lock system of the Genesee Valley Canal located there, both in Cattaraugus County near the Olean terminus.

Cuba Lake, originally known as Oil Creek Reservoir, located in the town of Cuba in Allegany County, was created in 1858 to help maintain water levels on the Genesee Valley Canal. Cuba Lake and some of its surrounding land is owned by New York State. The Seneca Nation holds its Oil Springs Territory on the southern end of the lake, a historic and culturally significant area. Today, cottage and home sites on the lake are officially leased from the state as part of the Cuba Lake District.
