= Buffalo, Bradford and Pittsburgh Railroad =

Railroad in New York

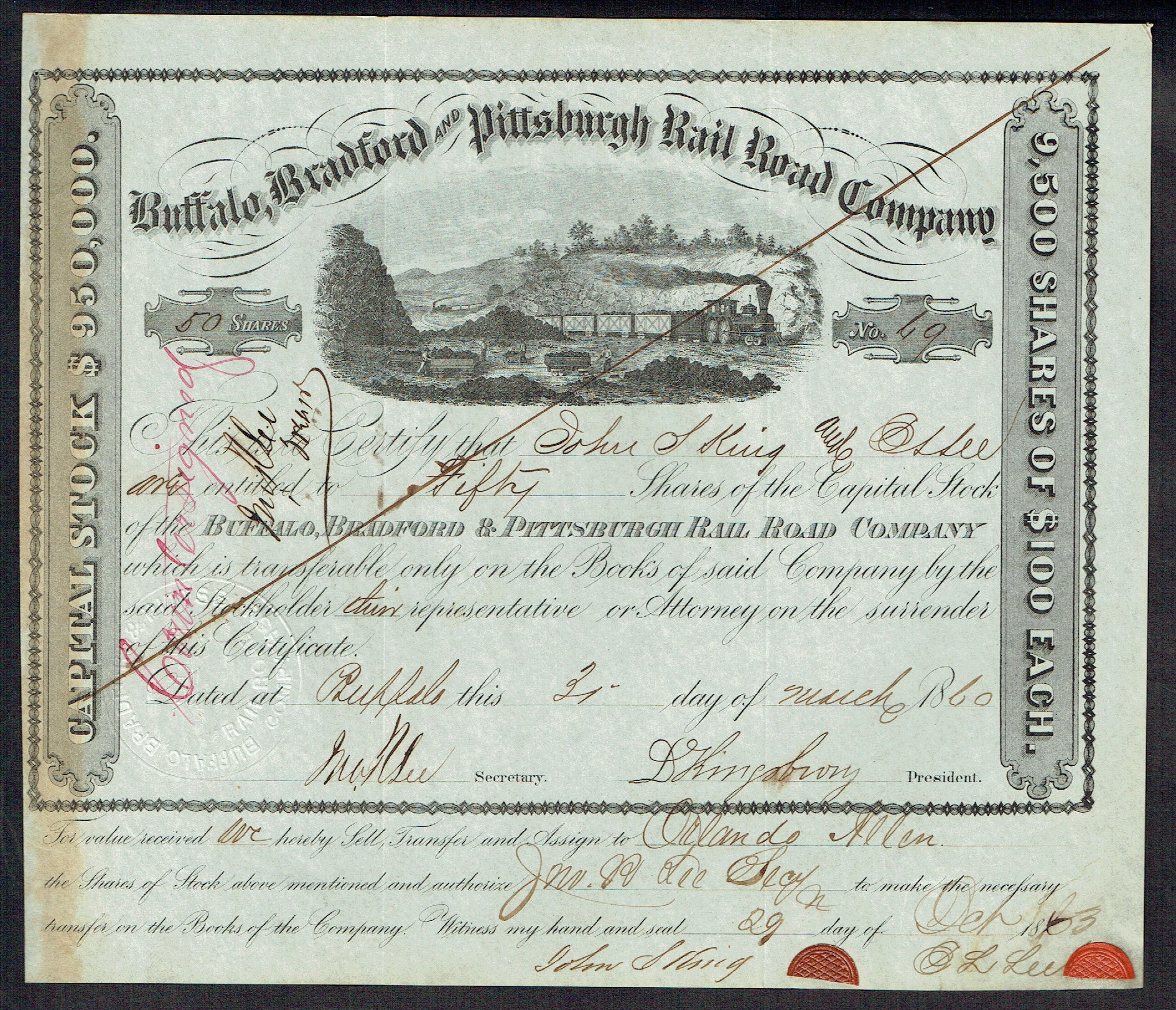
Share of the Buffalo, Bradford and Pittsburgh Rail Road Company, issued 31 March 1860

The Buffalo, Bradford and Pittsburgh Railroad was formed on February 26, 1859, by the merger of the Buffalo and Pittsburgh Railroad and the Buffalo and Bradford Railroad. The Buffalo, Bradford and Pittsburgh Railroad was leased to the Erie Railroad on January 6, 1866, for period of 499 years. It was most commonly known as the Bradford Branch of the Erie.

The railroad operated about 30 miles (48 km) of track in New York and Pennsylvania. The main line ran 26 miles (42 km) from Carrollton, NY to Gilesville, PA. The Bradford Branch ran from Bradford to Nusbaum, PA, a distance of about 5 miles (8.0 km).
