= 1776 in Connecticut =

- Decades: 1750s; 1760s; 1770s; 1780s; 1790s
- See also: History of Connecticut; Historical outline of Connecticut; List of years in Connecticut; 1776 in the United States

This is a list of events in the year 1776 in Connecticut.

== Incumbents ==
- Governor:Jonathan Trumbull (Starting October 10)
- Lieutenant Governor:Matthew Griswold (Starting October 10)

== Events ==
- April 11th – Jonathan Trumbull is elected the 16th governor.
- July 4th – American Revolution: The United States Declaration of Independence, in which the United States officially declares independence from the British Empire, is approved by the Continental Congress and signed by its president, John Hancock, together with representatives from Connecticut, Delaware, Georgia, Maryland, Massachusetts Bay, New Hampshire, New Jersey, New York, North Carolina, Pennsylvania, Rhode Island, South Carolina and Virginia.
- August 2nd – American Revolution: A parchment copy of the Declaration of Independence is signed by 56 members of Congress (not all of whom had been present on July 4).
- October 10th – Jonathan Trumbull is sworn in as the 16th governor of the newly formed state. Matthew Griswold becomes the first Lieutenant Governor.

== Births ==
- January 2 – Jeremiah Chaplin, Reformed Baptist theologian (d. 1841)
- January 21 – Elisha Haley, legislator and politician (d. 1860)
- February 2 – John Marvin, politician (b. 1678)
- February 16 – Nicholas Ware, lawyer, politician and, slave owner (d. 1824)
- March 8 – Samuel Tweedy, legislator and politician (d. 1868)
- March 17 – Joel Abbot, physician and politician (d. 1826)
- March 19 – Philemon Beecher, attorney and legislator (d. 1839)
- May 28 – Joseph Lee Smith, lawyer, military officer and judge (d. 1846)
- July 4 – Ethan Allen Brown, politician, seventh governor of Ohio (d. 1852)
- August 31 – Seth Perkins Staples, lawyer and politician (d. 1861)
- September 4 – Stephen Whitney, merchant (d. 1860)
- September 9
  - Parmenio Adams, businessman and politician (d. 1832)
  - Calvin Pease, lawyer and legislator (d. 1839)
- September 14 – Calvin Willey, politician (d. 1858)
- September 30 – Manasseh Leech, militiaman (d. 1828)
- December 1 – Isaac Lacey, politician (d. 1844)
- December 22 – Levi Lovering, drummer and early rudimental drum manual author (d. 1852)

=== Undated ===
- James Murdock, biblical scholar (d. 1856)

== Deaths ==
- June 13 – Elizabeth Scott, British-born American poet and hymnwriter (b. 1708)
- July 19 – Jonathan Parsons, clergyman (b. 1705)
- September 16 – Thomas Knowlton, patriot (b. 1740)
- September 22 – Nathan Hale, Patriot, soldier and spy (b. 1755)
- October 1 – Ebenezer Baldwin, religious leader (b. 1745)

== See also ==
- 1776 in the United States
