= Lower Mill =

Lower Mill is the name of a number of mills.

== United Kingdom ==
=== Windmills ===
- Lower Mill, Dalham, a windmill in Suffolk
- Lower Mill, Eastry, a windmill in Kent
- Lower Mill, Great Baddow, a windmill in Essex
- Lower Mill, Hailsham, a windmill in East Sussex
- Lower Mill, Hockwold, a drainage mill in Norfolk
- Lower Mill, Poringland, a windmill in Norfolk
- Lower Mill, Radwinter, a windmill in Essex
- Lower Mill, Stanton, a windmill in Suffolk
- Lower Mill, Woodchurch, a windmill in Kent

=== Watermills ===
- Lower Mill, Cheadle, a watermill in Cheshire
- Lower Mill, Crayford, a watermill on the River Cray, Kent
- Lower Mill, East Malling, a watermill on the East Malling Stream, Kent
- Lower Mill, Shoreham, a watermill on the River Darent, Kent

== United States ==
- Elliottville Lower Mill, East Killingly, Connecticut, listed on the National Register of Historic Places (NRHP)
- Dorchester-Milton Lower Mills Industrial District, Boston, Massachusetts, NRHP-listed
- Lower Mill (Honeoye Falls, New York), NRHP-listed
