= Manasseh Leech =

Personal details
- Born: September 30, 1776 Waterford, Connecticut
- Died: March 16, 1828 (aged 51) Lima, New York
- Spouse: Esther H. Gates
- Profession: Farmer, soldier

Military service
- Allegiance: United States of America; New York
- Branch/service: (New York (state)) New York State Militia
- Years of service: 1806–1817
- Rank: Colonel
- Battles/wars: War of 1812

Colonel Manasseh Leech (also spelled Leach) (September 30, 1776 – March 16, 1828) was a pioneer and early settler of Western New York, War of 1812 veteran, and town supervisor of Lima, New York, USA.

== History ==
In 1797, Manasseh Leech, along with his brothers Clement, Ebenezer, Payne and a cousin, Richard Leech, moved from their hometown of, Waterford, New London County, Connecticut to the Western New York frontier and settled in the Town of Charleston, Ontario County, New York (now Lima, Livingston County, New York).

Around 1799, Manasseh purchased land from Palmer Peck of Bloomfield, New York and built his home, The Leech-Lloyd Farmhouse and Barn Complex. Manasseh lived at the homestead with his wife, Esther Gates, and raised two children, Josiah and Rachel.

Manasseh became a prominent citizen in Lima as a farmer, NY militia officer, and town official. He was the first town clerk (1809) and he served as the town supervisor from 1818–1822 and again from 1825–1827. Colonel Leech is buried along with his wife and children in the Presbyterian Church Cemetery in Lima.

== Genealogy ==
Manasseh is a five-greats grandson of colonist and New England diarist Thomas Minor. Other distant relatives include Ulysses S. Grant and John D. Rockefeller.

== Military service ==
In 1806, New York State military records indicate that Leech was promoted to lieutenant in the Ontario County NY militia commanded by Brig. Gen. Amos Hall. Leech was subsequently promoted to Captain in 1809.

He was active in the War of 1812 as a Captain and as a First Major serving with Lt. Col. Micah Brooks and paymaster Jonathan Child in the Ontario County NY Militia's 4th Regiment. Micah Brooks’ regiment arrived as reinforcements in Williamsville, New York on August 11, 1814 during the Siege of Fort Erie. Major Leech was promoted to Colonel sometime after the war and was listed as Colonel of the Ontario County NY Militia's 4th Regiment of Infantry in 1817.
