= List of New York State Historic Markers in Monroe County, New York =

This is an incomplete list of New York State Historic Markers in Monroe County, New York.

== Listings county-wide ==
	Marker name	Image	Date designated	Location	City or Town	Coords	Marker text
1	CITY OF TRYON			On East Side Of Landing Rd., Near Blossom Rd.	Brighton, Town Of, New York		First White Settlement West Of Canandaigua Founded 1797, Abandoned 1818. John Lusk Was The First Settler 1789.
2	IRONDEQUOIT			On Blossom Rd., East Of Landing Rd. North	Brighton, Town Of, New York		Site Of A Large Algonkin Town The Senecas Lingered Here Until 1845
3	HENRY R. SELDEN			On Us 104 At Clarkson	Clarkson, Town Of, New York		1805–1885 Lieut. Gov. And Judge Lived Here. George B. Selden Inventor Of "Selden Patent" For Automobiles Was Born Here.
4	HOME OF SINEON B. JEWETT			On Nys 19 At Clarkson	Clarkson, Town Of, New York		1801–1869 Political Leader, Jurist, Partner Of Henry R. Selden, U.s. Marshall, Northern N.y. Under President Buchanan.
5	HOUSTON TAVERN			On Us 104 About 1 Mi. E. Of Garland	Clarkson, Town Of, New York		A Popular Stopping Place In Stage Coach Days. Built Soon After 1825 For Isaac Houston Who Was The Sole Proprietor For Many Years
6	PHILIP BOSS			On Us 104 At Clarkson	Clarkson, Town Of, New York		Artist And Cabinet Maker Lived Here From 1820 To 1830. Moving To Rochester, Then, He Achieved Great Popularity As A Painter Of Portraits
7	FORT SITE			On Bluff Overlooking Lake Ontario At Sea Breezr	Irondequoit, Town Of, New York		Here Denonville's French Army Landed To Invade The Seneca Country; July 12, 1687, 400 Men Were Left To Build Fort; Battle At Victor July 13, 1687
8	CAMP SITE			On Canfield Rd. At Mendons Ponds Park	Mendon, Town Of, New York		Of Primitive Algonkins Who Fished Here Ages Ago Driven Out By The Iroquois Who Occupied This Region
9	TOTIAKTON			On E. Side Plain Rd., S. Of Rochester Junction	Mendon, Town Of, New York		Seneca Town Of 120 Cabins Was Located Here Burned By Denonville, 1687 Jesuit Mission, 1668–1683
10	WAR SITE			In Mendon Ponds Park	Mendon, Town Of, New York		Denonville's Army Of 3000 French And Indian Allies Camped Here 23 July 1687 Returning To Irondequoit After Razing Seneca Towns
11	BIRTHPLACE OF			On Nichols St. About 2 Mis. S.e. Of Spencerport	Ogden, Town Of, New York		John T. Trowbridge 1827–1916 Poet; Author Of "Darius Green And His Flying Machine" And Other Stories
12	INDIAN HILL			On Bangs Rd. About 2 Mis. N. Of Churchville	Ogden, Town Of, New York		Indian Encampment When Whites Entered Region. Grandparents Of Frances E. Willard Settled Here In 1816 As Pioneers On This Land
13	METHODIST CHURCH			On Nys 259 At Parma Center	Parma, Town Of, New York		Oldest West Of The Genesee First Sermon Preached 1804; Class Organized 1811 Church Built 1830.
14	LA SALLE ROAD			On Nys 96 About 1/4 Mi. E. Of Bushnell Basin	Perinton, Town Of, New York		Route Used By The French Army Of Denonville To Destroy Seneca Indians At Town South Of Victor, Ny July 13, 1687
15	DENONVILLE			On Golf Course Of Oak Hill Country Club	Pittsford, Town Of, New York		With Army Of 3000 French And Indians Crossed These Ground Twice In July, 1687
16	FIRST LIBRARY			On Mendon Ctr. Rd., About 1 Mi. S.e. Of Pittsford	Pittsford, Town Of, New York		In The Genesee Country Northfield Library Co., 1803–1808, Kept Its Books At The Farm Of Ezra Patterson, First Librarian
17	ON THIS SPOT			On Nys 64 About 1 Mi. S. Of Pittsford	Pittsford, Town Of, New York		Stood The First School House In Monroe County Erected 1794; First Teacher, John Barrows.
18	PITTSFORD VILLAGE			At Intersection Nys 96 & Nys 31 At Pittsford	Pittsford, Town Of, New York		Founded August 1789 By Captain Simon Stone And Lieutenant Israel Stone
19	SENECA TRAIL			On Nys 96 About 1½ Mi. E. Of Pittsford Village	Pittsford, Town Of, New York		Crossing The Irondequoit Thickly Wooded, Perilous Defile Where Denonville, Expected An Ambuscade On Journey To Gannogaro, 1689
20	THE FIRST HOUSE			On Nys 31 At Pittsford	Pittsford, Town Of, New York		In Pittsford Village Was Erected On This Spot By Israel Stone
21	FRANCES E. WILLARD			On Main St., Churchville	Riga, Town Of, New York		Great Temperance Leader Was Born In House Standing On This Site Sept. 28, 1839. The Willards Left This Home For Ohio Two Years Later.
22	OLD TAVERN			On Riga Mumford Rd. At Riga Ctr.	Riga, Town Of, New York		Built By J. Thomson, 1808 First Frame House And First Post Office In Town Of Riga Thomas Adams Homestead.
23	RIGA ACADEMY			On Riga Mumford Rd., Riga Ctr.	Riga, Town Of, New York		A Flourishing School For Boarding And Day Pupils Was Organized Here In 1846. The Building Was Earlier Known As Thomson's Tavern.
24	CASCONCHIAGON			On Main St., Churchville	Rochester, City Of, New York		Indian Village At The Falls Nearby. Occupied By Senecas Until 1819
25	HIGHLAND PARK			Near Pavilion At Highland Park	Rochester, City Of, New York		Rochester's First Park Was Offered In 1883 By Ellwanger And Barry And Accepted Jan. 13, 1888. Park Commission Was Formed May 1, 1888.
26	INDIAN SPRING			At Intersection Of Spring & Washington Sts.	Rochester, City Of, New York		Attracted Indians Here; Supplied Good Water To Rochester's First Settlers For A Decade After 1812; Gave Name To Spring Street.
27	INDIAN TOWN			On E. Side Of Joseph C. Wilson (formerly River) Blvd. Near Elmwood Ave.	Rochester, City Of, New York		In Primitive Wilderness Here Was A Large Algonkin Village Whose Bark Cabins And Tilled Fields Covered Nine Acres
28	JONATHAN CHILD			On Grounds Of Fourth Church Of Christ Scientist	Rochester, City Of, New York		First Mayor Of Rochester 1834–1835, Built The House In 1838 And Lived Here With His Wife, Sophia Eliza Rochester Child, Until 1850
29	LEWIS HENRY			At Intersection Of Fitzhugh And Troup Sts.	Rochester, City Of, New York		Morgan's Home 1855–1881. Here He Wrote His Great Books: "The American Beaver", "The Human Family", "Ancient Society".
30	OLD HIGH SCHOOL			On Grounds Of First Unitarian Church On Cortland St.	Rochester, City Of, New York		Built On This Site, 1827 By Brighton Districts 4 And 14 Named Rochester Collegiate Institute, 1839. Dr. Chester Dewey Was Principal 1836-51.
31	PIONEER SCHOOL			On Fitzhugh St.	Rochester, City Of, New York		First Schoolhouse In Rochester Was Built Of Wood On This Site, 1813. It Was Replaced By A Two-story Stone Building, 1836, And By This Structure, 1873.
32	SITE OF			On W. Bank Of Genesee R.e. Of N. End Of Joseph C. Wilson Blvd. (formerly River St.)	Rochester, City Of, New York		Indian Fort Built By Early Algonkins In Form Of A Semicircular Earthen Embankment With Three Entrances
33	SUSAN B. ANTHONY			On Madison St. Rochester	Rochester, City Of, New York		Outstanding Leader In Woman's Rights Movement Made Her Home Here With Her Sister, Mary 1866–1906
34	HONEOYE			On East River Rd., W. Rush	Rush, Town Of, New York		Valley Three Indian Tribes Have Hunted, Fished And Tilled The Soil Here For Thousands Of Years
35	SITE OF A SETTLEMENT OF			On Avon Rd. At Monroe-livingston County Line	Rush, Town Of, New York		Tuscaroras 6Th Nation Of Iroquois League. Driven From Carolinas By British 1714–1722
36	MCCORMICK REAPER			At Intersection Market & Park Sts. At Brockport	Sweden, Town Of, New York		Made Here In 1846. Seymour And Morgan By Building 100 Reapers For Cyrus Mccormick Began Quantity Production Of Reapers
37	BURIAL SITE			On Burrell Rd. S. Of Scottsville	Wheatland, Town Of, New York		Quaker Cemetery Bought 1833 From Darius Shadbolt
38	ERECTED 1854			On South Rd. S. Of Scottsville	Wheatland, Town Of, New York		By Orthodox Quakers Used Thirty Years
39	FIRST HOUSE			On Scottsville-west Henrietta Rd. At Scottsville	Wheatland, Town Of, New York		West Of Genesee River Stood 1700 Feet Due South "Indian" Allen, Builder, 1786 Peter Shaeffer, Settler, 1789 First Town Meeting 1797
40	NORTHAMPTON			Main St. At Scottsville	Wheatland, Town Of, New York		First Town West Of Genesee River Organized Here 1797 Ebenezer Allen Home 1786 Peter Shaeffer Farm 1789 Terminus Pioneer R.r. 1838
41	SITE OF			On Burrell Rd., S. Of Scottsville	Wheatland, Town Of, New York		Early School Quarkers Met Here 1824–1827
42	SITE OF FIRST			On Burrell Rd. S. Of Scottsville	Wheatland, Town Of, New York		Quaker Meeting House Town Of Wheatland Frame Building 1827 Used Until 1854 By Hicksites

== See also ==
- List of New York State Historic Markers
- National Register of Historic Places listings in New York
- List of National Historic Landmarks in New York
