= Honeoye Falls, New York =

- Village
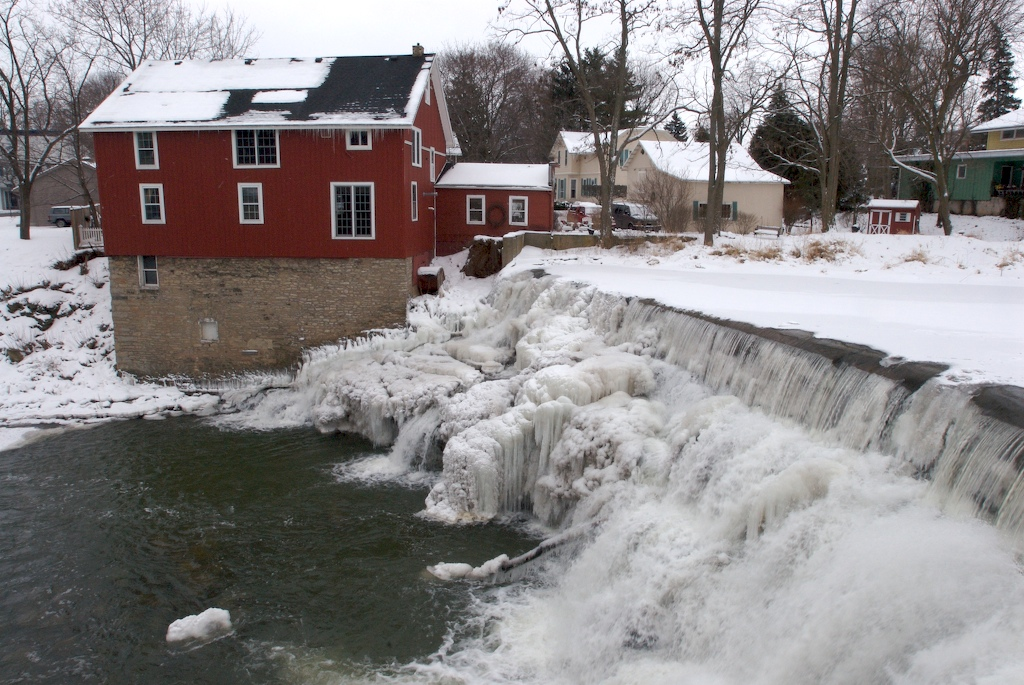
- A small waterfall on Honeoye Creek, which gave the village its name

- Location in Monroe County and the state of New York

- Location of New York in the United States
- Coordinates: 42°57′23″N 77°35′14″W
- Country: United States
- State: New York
- County: Monroe
- Town: Mendon
- Incorporated: 1791

Government
  - Mayor: Richard B. Milne (2025)

Area
  - Total: 2.59 sq mi (6.72 km^{2})
  - Land: 2.54 sq mi (6.59 km^{2})
  - Water: 0.050 sq mi (0.13 km^{2})
- Elevation: 668 ft (204 m)

Population (2020)
  - Total: 2,706
  - Density: 1,064.0/sq mi (410.83/km^{2})
- Time zone: UTC-5 (EST)
  - Summer (DST): UTC-4 (EDT)
- ZIP Code: 14472
- Area code: 585
- FIPS code: 36-35364
- Website: www.villageofhoneoyefalls.gov

Honeoye Falls (/ˈhʌniɔɪ/ HUN-ee-oy) is a village within the town of Mendon in Monroe County, New York, United States. The population was 2,706 at the 2020 census. The village is sited next to a small waterfall on Honeoye Creek, which gives the village its name. The name "Honeoye" comes from the Seneca word ha-ne-a-yah, which means "lying finger", or "where the finger lies". The name comes from the local story of a Native American whose finger was bitten by a rattlesnake and who therefore cut off his finger with a tomahawk.

== History ==
The village was founded in 1791 by Zebulon Norton when he purchased 1,820 acres (7.4 km^{2}) of land for the price of 12½ cents per acre. He built a grist mill and later a sawmill at a waterfall on Honeoye Creek. The area was originally known as "Norton Mills". In 1827, Hiram Finch built a second mill, which would come to be called the Lower Mill to differentiate it from the earlier mill.

Honeoye Falls experienced an epidemic of scarlet fever in April 1893.

On May 17, 1973, the Lower Mill was listed on the National Register of Historic Places. The Honeoye Falls Village Historic District, St. John's Episcopal Church, Totiakton Site, and United States Post Office are also listed on the National Register of Historic Places.

== Geography ==
Honeoye Falls is located at 42°57′23″N 77°35′14″W (42.956331, −77.587353) on the falls of Honeoye Creek. It is in southeastern Monroe County, along the southern edge of the town of Mendon. It is bordered to the south by the town of Lima in Livingston. The city of Rochester is 15 miles (24 km) to the north.

New York State Route 65 passes through the village center along Ontario Street and North Main Street. Route 65 leads north 14 miles (23 km) to its terminus at Route 96 in Brighton, and southeast 4.5 miles (7.2 km) to U.S. Route 20 in West Bloomfield.

According to the U.S. Census Bureau, the village of Honeoye Falls has a total area of 2.60 square miles (6.73 km^{2}), of which 0.05 square miles (0.13 km^{2}), or 2.00%, are water. Honeoye Creek is a north- and west-flowing tributary of the Genesee River and rises 13 miles (21 km) to the south at the outlet of Honeoye Lake, one of the smaller Finger Lakes of New York.

== Demographics ==
Historical population
Census	Pop.	Note	%±
1870	921		—
1880	1,098		19.2%
1890	1,128		2.7%
1900	1,175		4.2%
1910	1,169		−0.5%
1920	1,107		−5.3%
1930	1,187		7.2%
1940	1,274		7.3%
1950	1,460		14.6%
1960	2,143		46.8%
1970	2,248		4.9%
1980	2,410		7.2%
1990	2,340		−2.9%
2000	2,595		10.9%
2010	2,674		3.0%
2020	2,706		1.2%
U.S. Decennial Census

=== 2020 census ===
As of the 2020 census, Honeoye Falls had a population of 2,706. The median age was 43.9 years. 19.8% of residents were under the age of 18 and 19.5% of residents were 65 years of age or older. For every 100 females there were 91.0 males, and for every 100 females age 18 and over there were 85.4 males age 18 and over.

0.0% of residents lived in urban areas, while 100.0% lived in rural areas.

There were 1,293 households in Honeoye Falls, of which 27.3% had children under the age of 18 living in them. Of all households, 38.3% were married-couple households, 19.2% were households with a male householder and no spouse or partner present, and 34.8% were households with a female householder and no spouse or partner present. About 38.1% of all households were made up of individuals and 18.2% had someone living alone who was 65 years of age or older.

There were 1,418 housing units, of which 8.8% were vacant. The homeowner vacancy rate was 0.0% and the rental vacancy rate was 11.9%.

Racial composition as of the 2020 census
Race	Number	Percent
White	2,523	93.2%
Black or African American	35	1.3%
American Indian and Alaska Native	1	0.0%
Asian	28	1.0%
Native Hawaiian and Other Pacific Islander	0	0.0%
Some other race	18	0.7%
Two or more races	101	3.7%
Hispanic or Latino (of any race)	65	2.4%

=== Demographic estimates ===
According to the 2021 ACS 5-year estimates, there were 689 families residing in the village.

=== 2000 census ===
As of the census of 2000, there were 2,595 people, 1,114 households, and 672 families residing in the village. The population density was 1,000.3 inhabitants per square mile (386.2/km^{2}). There were 1,156 housing units, with an average density of 445.6 per square mile (172.0/km^{2}). The racial makeup of the village was 97.15% White, 1.00% African American, 0.15% Native American, 0.77% Asian, 0.00% Pacific Islander, 0.23% from other races, and 0.69% from two or more races. 1.04% of the population were Hispanic or Latino of any race.

Out of 1,114 households, 30.2% had children under the age of 18 living with them, 46.7% were married couples living together, 11.1% had a female householder with no husband present, and 39.6% were non-families. 34.8% of all households were made up of individuals, and 18.0% had someone living alone who was 65 years of age or older. The average household size was 2.26 and the average family size was 2.95.

In the village, the population was spread out, with 24.2% under the age of 18, 5.6% from 18 to 24, 26.4% from 25 to 44, 25.2% from 45 to 64, and 18.5% who were 65 years of age or older. The median age was 41 years. For every 100 females, there were 80.3 males. For every 100 females aged 18 and over, there were 74.2 males.

The median income for a household in the village was $47,413 and the median income for a family was $66,818. Males had a median income of $46,136 versus $35,299 for females. The per capita income for the village was $27,987. 2.5% of the population and 0.6% of families were below the poverty line. 2.3% of those under the age of 18 and 4.6% of those 65 and older were living below the poverty line.

== Government ==
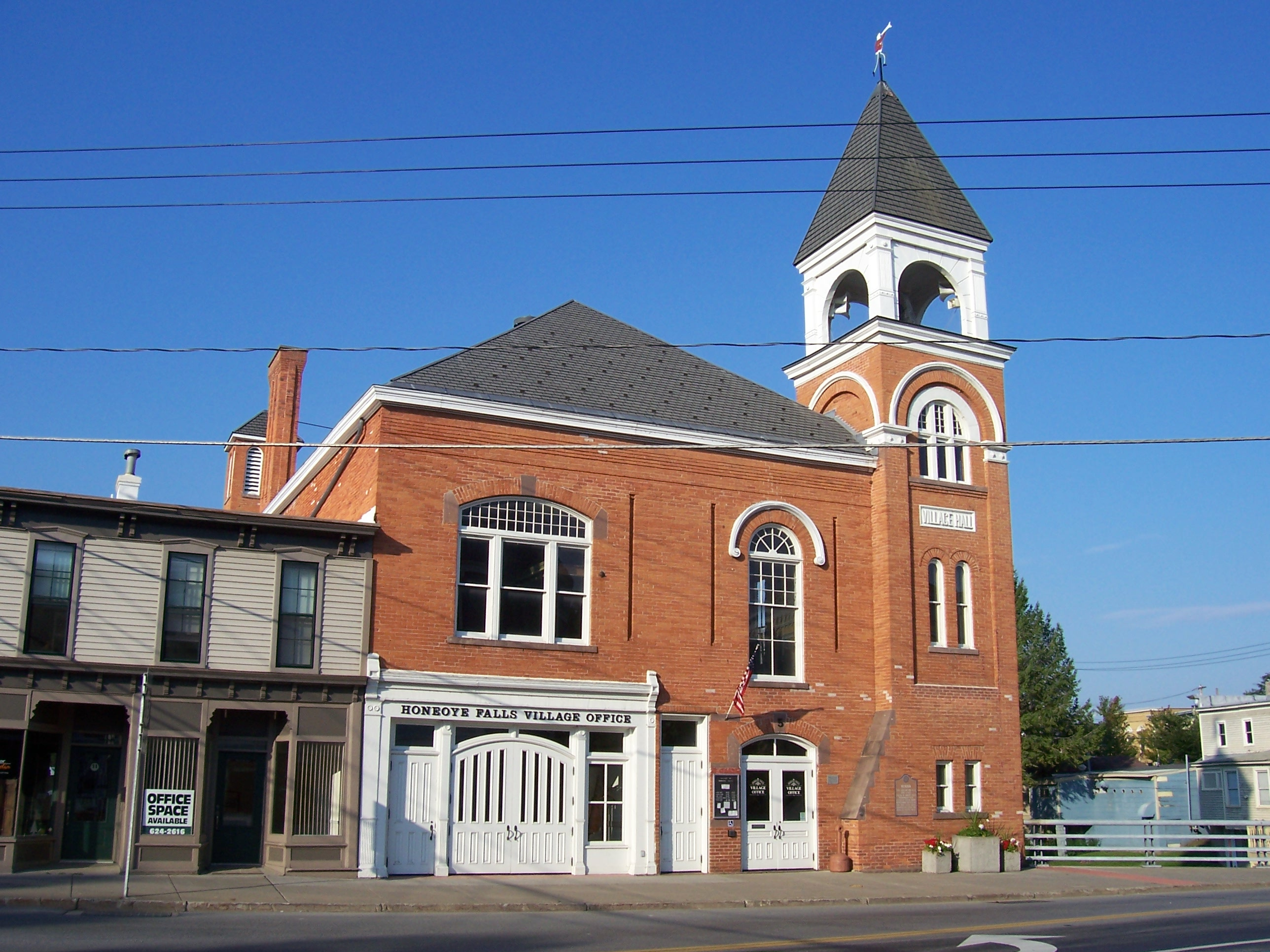
Honeoye Falls village hall

The village is governed by a board consisting of a mayor and four trustees, all elected by registered village voters.

Members of the board of trustees, as of 2026, were: Mayor Richard B. Milne, Deputy Mayor/Trustee Jacquelin Main, Trustee Daniel Harris, Trustee Virginia Floss, and Trustee Will Wagner.

Local justice used to be served at the Honeoye Falls Village Court, until April 1, 2025, when the court was transferred to the town of Mendon. Justice Sheldon Boyce used to preside over the village court.

Village presidents and mayors
Name	Title	Term	Name	Title	Term
Harry Allen	President	1838; 1865	James Heath	President	1918–1923
Henry Lockwood	President	1839	James S. Brown	President	1924–1925
Edward Downs	President	1840	F.F. Jobes	President	1926
Stephen Barrett	President	1841–1842	William Despard	Mayor	1927
Richard Ostrander	President	1845–1864	Basil Moore	Mayor	1953–1963
C.R. Hyde	President	1867	Bernard Drowne	Mayor	1963–1968
William Burberry	President	1868	Squire Kingston	Mayor	1969–1971
J.F. Kellogg	President	1870–1872; 1874–1884	William E. Clark	Mayor	1972–1973
W.G. Starr	President	1873	William Mantegna	Mayor	1973–1981
Milo Case	President	1884	Mary Louise Meisenzahl	Mayor	1981–1990
W.R. Yorks	President	1887; 1896	Anne R. Morton	Mayor	1991 – October 2000
Seymour Pierce	President	1888; 1892; 1905	Stephen R. Gustin	Mayor	October 2000 – 2005
H.A. Tripp	President	1889	Richard B. Milne	Mayor	2005 – present
J.W. Flick	President	1890			
John Martin	President	1894; 1904			
William Lay	President	1897; 1901; 1904			
Martin Pierce	President	1899–1900			
A.H. Holden	President	1906			
Levi Hill	President	1907–1914			
C.S. Lange	President	1915–1917			

== Education ==
Public schools in Honeoye Falls are part of the Honeoye Falls-Lima Central School District. Schools within the village include Honeoye Falls-Lima Senior High School, Honeoye Falls-Lima Middle School, and Manor Intermediate School. The Lima Primary School is in the district, but located in the town of Lima. The school's mascot is the Cougar.

93.2% of the population 25 years and older hold a high school diploma or higher, 43.5% a bachelor's degree or higher, and 16.4% a graduate/professional degree.

== Notable people ==
- David Francis Barry, 19th century photographer of the American West
- Truddi Chase, author of When Rabbit Howls
- Charles A. Goheen, Medal of Honor recipient for the American Civil War
- Delia C. Kenyon (1858-1945), businesswoman, suffragist and clubwoman
- Marty Reasoner, hockey player
- Joan Smith, Olympic biathlete
