= Lima, New York =

- Town
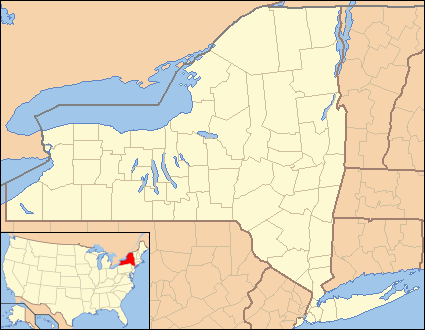
- Location within the state of New York
- Coordinates: 42°54′17″N 77°36′42″W
- Country: United States
- State: New York
- County: Livingston

Government
  - Type: Town Council
  - Town Supervisor: Mike Falk (C)
  - Town Council: Members' List: • Mark Petroski (R); • Steve Werner (R); • Ron Blodgett (R); • Bill Carey (R)

Area
  - Total: 31.94 sq mi (82.73 km^{2})
  - Land: 31.89 sq mi (82.60 km^{2})
  - Water: 0.054 sq mi (0.14 km^{2})

Population (2020)
  - Total: 4,154
  - Density: 130/sq mi (50.3/km^{2})
- ZIP Codes: 14485 (Lima); 14558 (South Lima); 14487 (Livonia); 14414 (Avon); 14472 (Honeoye Falls)
- FIPS code: 36-051-42333
- Website: www.townoflimany.gov

Lima (/ˈlaɪmə/, the name is a shibboleth) is a town in Livingston County, New York, United States. The population was 4,154 at the 2020 census. The town is in the northeast part of the county, south of Rochester. The village of Lima is located within the town.

== History ==
The town of Lima was organized in 1789 (before Livingston County was established) as the "Town of Charleston", but was renamed "Lima" in 1808 to reflect that many residents had come from Old Lyme, Connecticut, and to avoid confusion with the town of Charleston in Montgomery County, New York.

The Genesee Wesleyan Seminary (1830) / Genesee College (1849) in Lima village was one of the first co-educational schools in the country when it first opened in 1822. Eventually, determined by a Methodist-Episcopal convention in 1870, the college was shut in favor of the newly developed Syracuse University (1871), over the protests of the residents of Lima.

The population of Lima was 1,890 in 1920.

The Ganoung Cobblestone Farmhouse, Godfrey House and Barn Complex, Leech-Lloyd Farmhouse and Barn Complex, Leech-Parker Farmhouse, Markham Cobblestone Farmhouse and Barn Complex, Martin Farm Complex, Ogilvie Moses Farmhouse, Zebulon Moses Farm Complex, and Thomas Peck Farmhouse are listed on the National Register of Historic Places.

== Geography ==
Lima is in northeastern Livingston County. The northern town line is the border of Monroe County, and the eastern town boundary is the border of Ontario County. According to the United States Census Bureau, the town has a total area of 31.9 square miles (82.7 km^{2}), of which 0.04 square miles (0.1 km^{2}), or 0.17%, are water. Honeoye Creek, a north-flowing tributary of the Genesee River, defines the eastern town line.

New York State Route 5 (in part, Avon-Lima Road and East Main Street) conjoined with U.S. Route 20 is a major east-west highway. New York State Route 15A, a north-south highway, intersects NY-5/US-20 in Lima village.

== Education ==
Public schools in Lima are in the Honeoye Falls-Lima Central School District and include Honeoye Falls–Lima High School, Honeoye Falls-Lima Middle School, and Manor Intermediate School. The Lima Primary School is in the district. The school mascot is the cougar.

As of June 2009, Genesee Community College had started construction for one of its satellite campuses. The campus was expected to be finished and open for the fall 2009 semester.

Elim Bible Institute and College is located in Lima village. It is a Christian college that offers a two-year degree and certifications in religious study.

Lima Christian School (est. 1974) is a private school representing 15 local districts, grades K-12.

== Demographics ==
Historical population
Census	Pop.	Note	%±
1820	1,963		—
1830	1,764		−10.1%
1840	2,176		23.4%
1850	2,433		11.8%
1860	2,782		14.3%
1870	2,912		4.7%
1880	2,782		−4.5%
1890	2,438		−12.4%
1900	2,279		−6.5%
1910	2,068		−9.3%
1920	1,890		−8.6%
1930	1,900		0.5%
1940	1,986		4.5%
1950	2,336		17.6%
1960	2,716		16.3%
1970	3,445		26.8%
1980	3,859		12.0%
1990	4,187		8.5%
2000	4,541		8.5%
2010	4,305		−5.2%
2020	4,154		−3.5%
U.S. Decennial Census

As of the census of 2000, there were 4,541 people, 1,553 households, and 1,102 families residing in the town. The population density was 142.4 inhabitants per square mile (55.0/km^{2}). There were 1,610 housing units at an average density of 50.5 per square mile (19.5/km^{2}). The racial makeup of the town was 96.87% White, 1.04% Black or African American, 0.29% Native American, 0.44% Asian, 0.07% Pacific Islander, 0.33% from other races, and 0.97% from two or more races. Hispanic or Latino of any race were 1.26% of the population.

There were 1,553 households, out of which 35.0% had children under the age of 18 living with them, 57.8% were married couples living together, 9.0% had a female householder with no husband present, and 29.0% were non-families. 24.2% of all households were made up of individuals, and 9.0% had someone living alone who was 65 years of age or older. The average household size was 2.59 and the average family size was 3.10.

In the town, the population was spread out, with 23.8% under the age of 18, 13.2% from 18 to 24, 28.8% from 25 to 44, 24.0% from 45 to 64, and 10.3% who were 65 years of age or older. The median age was 36 years. For every 100 females, there were 96.5 males. For every 100 females age 18 and over, there were 95.2 males.

The median income for a household in the town was $48,774, and the median income for a family was $57,127. Males had a median income of $40,607 versus $26,316 for females. The per capita income for the town was $18,972. About 2.7% of families and 4.5% of the population were below the poverty line, including 4.0% of those under age 18 and 6.0% of those age 65 or over.

== Communities and locations in the Town of Lima ==
- Commins Corners – A location in the northeast part of the town.
- Idaho – A location in the southeast corner of the town.
- Lima – A village on NY-5/US-20.
- North Bloomfield – A hamlet at the east town line in the North-Eastern corner of the town. The North Bloomfield School was added to the National Register of Historic Places in 1981.
- South Lima – A hamlet and census-designated place at the southwest corner of the town.

== Notable people ==
- Emily M. J. Cooley, religious and temperance leader
- Kenneth Keating, U.S. senator
- Ken O'Dea, Major League Baseball player
- James Edward Quigley, former archbishop of Chicago
- Henry Jarvis Raymond, journalist, politician, and founder of The New York Times.
- Joel Dorman Steele, educator and author
- Andrew Jackson Thayer, U.S. congressman
