= Leech–Parker Farmhouse =

Historic house in New York, United States

- U.S. National Register of Historic Places
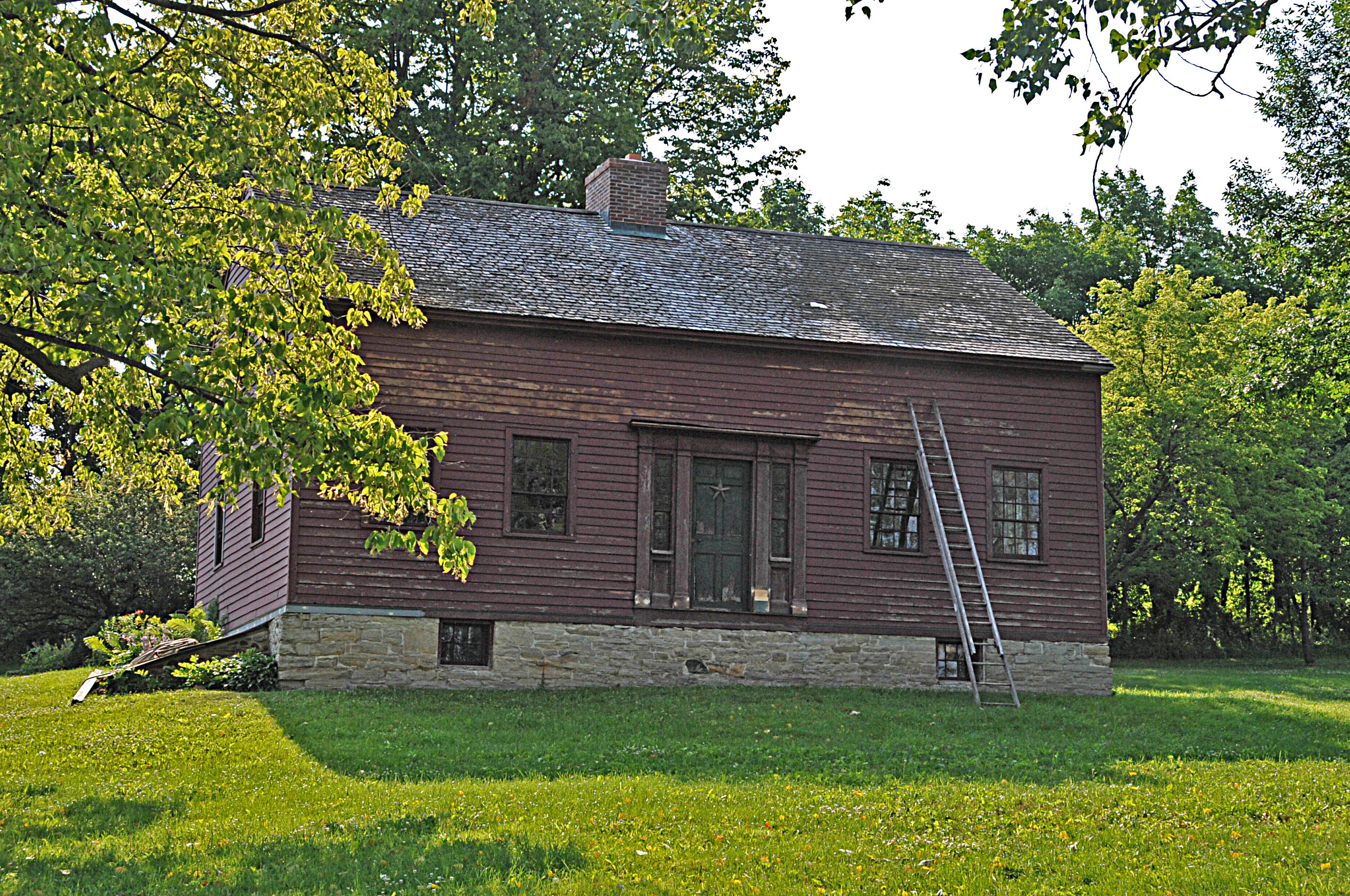

- Location within New York Location within the United States
- Location: 1537 York St., Lima, New York
- Coordinates: 42°55′9″N 77°35′30″W
- Area: 2.5 acres (1.0 ha)
- Built: 1800
- Architect: Leech, Ebenezer
- Architectural style: Federal
- MPS: Lima MRA
- NRHP reference No.: 89001116
- Added to NRHP: August 31, 1989

Leech–Parker Farmhouse is a historic home located at Lima in Livingston County, New York. It was built about 1800 and is a 1 1/2-story, five-bay settlement period dwelling designed in a New England building tradition. The L-shaped structure is built on a rubblestone foundation and consists of the original structure with a 1-story gable-roofed addition. Also on the property are a privy and well dating from the 19th century.

It was listed on the National Register of Historic Places in 1989.
