= Charles Arthur Goheen =

American Civil War soldier

- Born: August 5, 1843; Groveland, New York, US
- Died: May 8, 1889 (aged 45)
- Burial place: Honeoye Falls, New York, US
- Military career
- Allegiance: United States
- Branch: United States Army
- Rank: First Sergeant
- Units: (New York (state)) Company G, 8th New York Volunteer Cavalry Regiment
- Conflicts: Battle of Waynesboro; American Civil War
- Awards: Medal of Honor

Charles A. Goheen (August 5, 1843 – May 8, 1899) was an American soldier who fought in the American Civil War. Goheen received the United States' highest award for bravery during combat, the Medal of Honor. Goheen's medal was won for capturing the flag at the Battle of Waynesboro in Virginia on March 2, 1865. He was honored with the award on March 26, 1865.

Goheen was born in Groveland, New York, entered service in Rochester, and was buried in Honeoye Falls, New York.

== Medal of Honor citation ==
The President of the United States of America, in the name of Congress, takes pleasure in presenting the Medal of Honor to First Sergeant Charles Arthur Goheen, United States Army, for extraordinary heroism on 2 March 1865, while serving with Company G, 8th New York Cavalry, in action at Waynesboro, Virginia, for capture of flag.

== See also ==
- List of American Civil War Medal of Honor recipients: G–L
