= Ganoung Cobblestone Farmhouse =

Historic house in New York, United States

- U.S. National Register of Historic Places
- Location within New York Location within the United States
- Location: 2798 Popular Hill Rd., Lima, New York
- Coordinates: 42°51′47″N 77°39′41″W
- Area: 94.6 acres (38.3 ha)
- Built: 1830
- Architectural style: Greek Revival, Federal
- MPS: Lima MRA
- NRHP reference No.: 89001120
- Added to NRHP: August 31, 1989

Ganoung Cobblestone Farmhouse is a historic home located at Lima in Livingston County, New York. It was constructed in the 1830s and is a vernacular two story, five bay cobblestone structure built in the late Federal / early Greek Revival style. It features irregularly shaped, variously sized and colored cobbles in its construction. Also on the property is a 19th-century carriage barn, small shed, and a well with pump.

It was listed on the National Register of Historic Places in 1989.
