= Honeoye Falls Village Historic District =

Historic district in New York, United States

- U.S. National Register of Historic Places
- U.S. Historic district
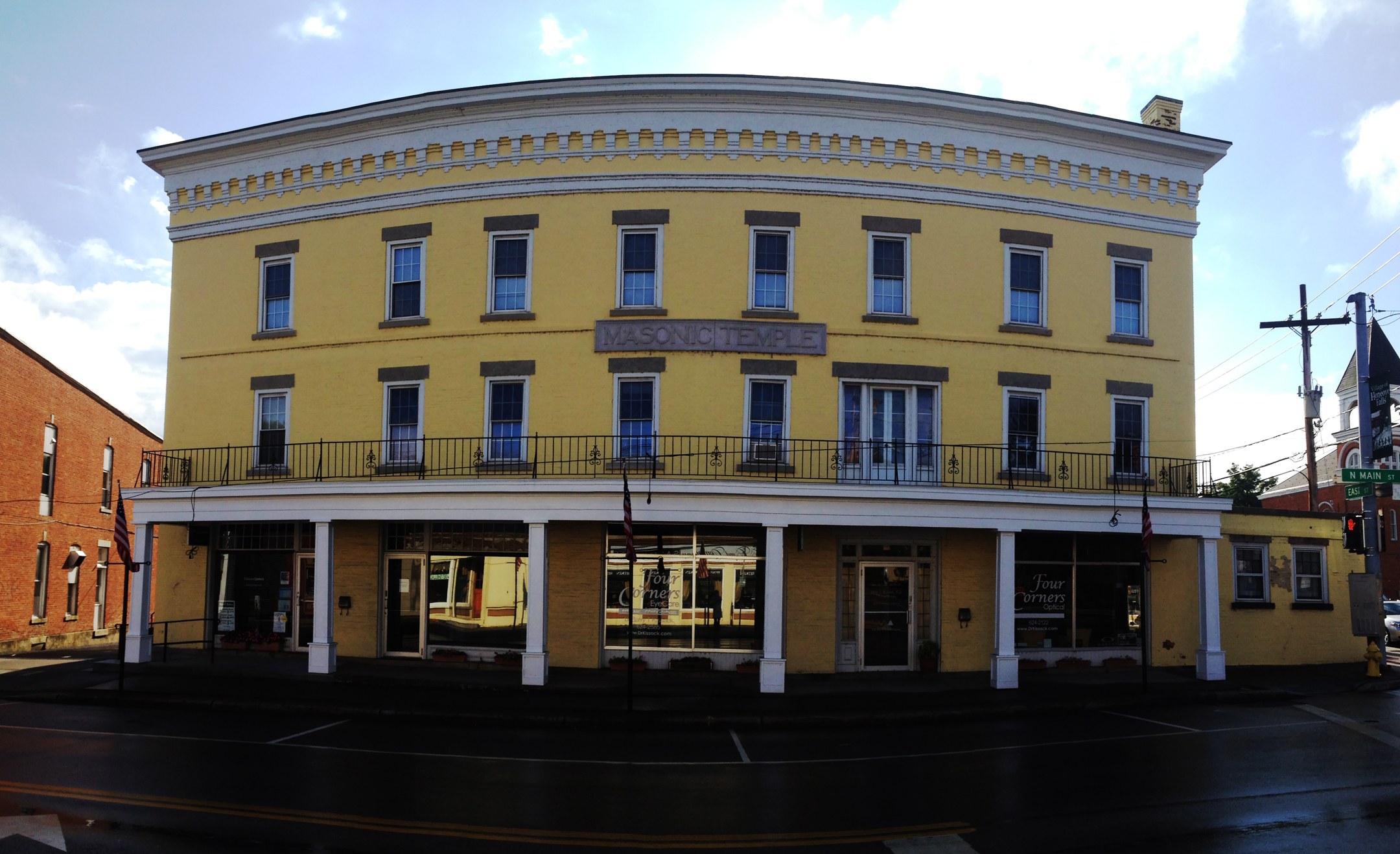
- The Masonic Temple Building (aka Wilcox House)

- Location within New York Location within the United States
- Location: Roughly, jct. of Main, Monroe and Ontario Sts. and adjacent areas, Honeoye Falls, New York
- Coordinates: 42°56′54″N 77°35′32″W
- Area: 130 acres (53 ha)
- Architectural style: Multiple
- NRHP reference No.: 93001225
- Added to NRHP: November 24, 1993

Honeoye Falls Village Historic District is a national historic district at Honeoye Falls in Monroe County, New York, USA. The district encompasses 217 residential, industrial, commercial, religious, civic and educational properties in the historic core of the village of Honeoye Falls. It features substantially intact commercial architecture dating from about 1825 to about 1940.

It was listed on the National Register of Historic Places in 1993.
