= St. John's Episcopal Church (Honeoye Falls, New York) =

Historic church in New York, United States

- U.S. National Register of Historic Places
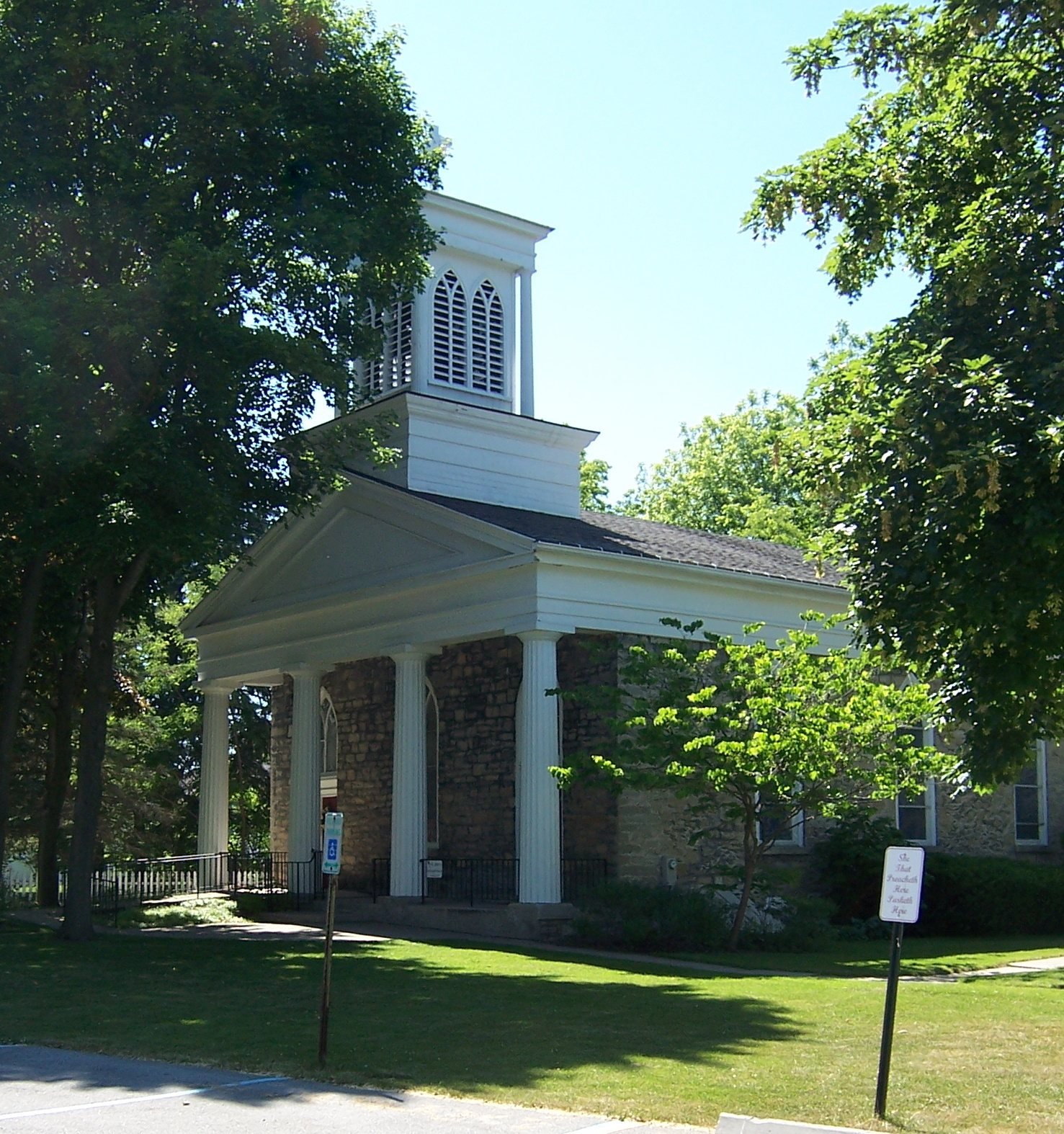
- The church in May 2010

- Location within New York Location within the United States
- Location: 11 Episcopal Ave., Honeoye Falls, New York
- Coordinates: 42°57′11.5″N 77°35′35″W
- Area: 1 acre (0.40 ha)
- Built: 1841
- Architectural style: Greek Revival, Gothic Revival
- NRHP reference No.: 88001014
- Added to NRHP: July 07, 1988

St. John's Episcopal Church is a historic Episcopal church located at Honeoye Falls in Monroe County, New York. It is a one-story, stone structure built in 1841–1842, with a bell tower added in 1855. The building features Greek Revival massing and a Doric order portico with Gothic Revival arched windows and doorways.

It was listed on the National Register of Historic Places in 1988.
