= United States Post Office (Honeoye Falls, New York) =

- US Post Office-Honeoye Falls
- U.S. National Register of Historic Places
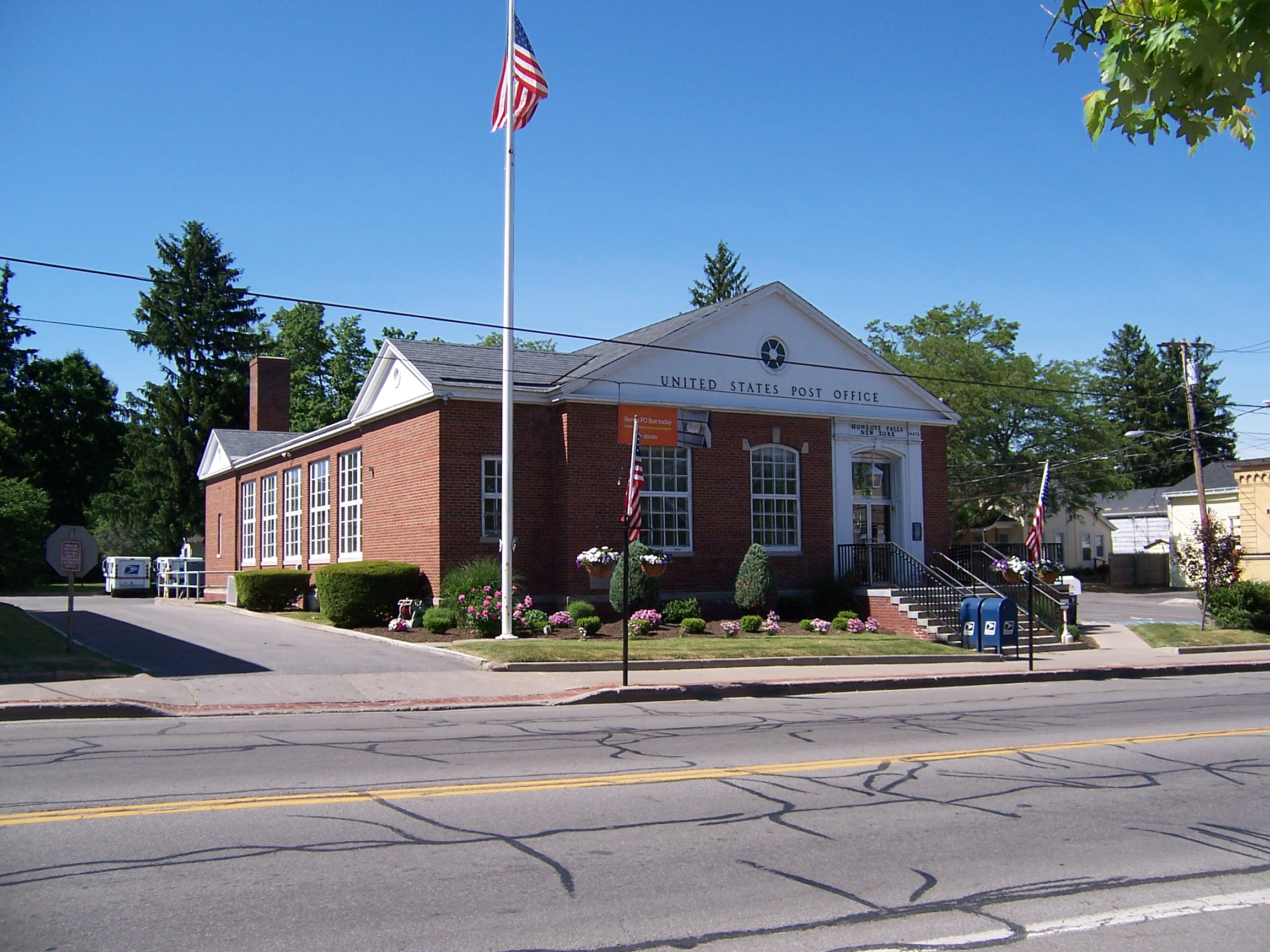
- The post office in May 2010

- Location within New York Location within the United States
- Location: 39 W. Main St., Honeoye Falls, New York
- Coordinates: 42°57′8.3″N 77°35′32.6″W
- Area: less than one acre
- Built: 1940
- Architect: Louis A. Simon, Stuart Edie
- Architectural style: Colonial Revival
- MPS: US Post Offices in New York State, 1858-1943, TR
- NRHP reference No.: 88002505
- Added to NRHP: May 11, 1989

US Post Office-Honeoye Falls is a historic post office building located at 39 West Main Street in Honeoye Falls, Monroe County, New York. It is a one-story brick Colonial Revival structure designed by Louis A. Simon, Supervising Architect of the Treasury Department, and built in 1940–1941 at a cost of $70,000. It serves the 14472 ZIP Code, covering the village of Honeoye Falls and surrounding portions of the Town of Mendon. It is also noted for containing original artwork by artist Stuart Carson Edie. It was listed on the National Register of Historic Places on May 11, 1989.

== History ==
=== Early postal service (1815-1920) ===
Prior to the establishment of a local post office, mail for the area was received through Lima, New York. Postal service in the immediate area was first officially established on October 30, 1815, under the name Mendon (Ontario), with Thomas Loveland as postmaster, but this office was discontinued in 1821.

On September 8, 1826, a new office was established under the name West Mendon. Horace Wheeler, who served as a Justice of the Peace from 1828 to 1833, was appointed the first postmaster. Historical accounts suggest Wheeler may have operated the post office out of a corner of Joseph Dixon's general store, located near the site of the future federal building.

The post office was renamed Honeoye Falls on March 24, 1838, following the village's incorporation. Throughout the 19th century, the post office operated out of various commercial storefronts. For example, Postmaster George B. McBride (appointed 1853) ran a harness shop, and Postmaster Richard Ostrander (appointed 1869) conducted postal duties alongside his shoemaker's shop. During Ostrander's tenure, the office was located in a frame building west of the Park and Babcock store.

By the turn of the century, the mail was arriving via the New York Central Railroad, with mail for nearby Lima being sorted out of the Honeoye Falls pouches. Residents typically gathered at the office to wait for the distribution of mails into small glass-front boxes. In 1903, under Postmistress Marion Martin, the post office was located in a shop on North Main Street later occupied by Falls Quality Cleaners.

=== Masonic Temple Era (1920–1941) ===
In early 1920, the newly incorporated Union Star Temple Association purchased the "Wilcox Hotel" property at the corner of Main and East Streets to serve as a new Masonic Temple. The building was a village landmark with a long history: the site originally held a hotel erected by Abraham Parish prior to the War of 1812, followed by a brick hotel built by Daniel Gibson in 1827. It was later remodeled into a three-story structure by Sylvester Wilcox about sixty years prior to the Masonic purchase.

James Tyler, a prominent Rochester architect, was engaged to draw up plans for the remodeling. The construction work was executed by contractor Matthew D. Bancroft of West Bloomfield. The renovation design allocated the upper floors for lodge rooms, a dining hall, and club facilities, while the ground floor was divided into four sections to be leased for business purposes.

In August 1920, the Post Office Department accepted the Association's proposal to lease one of these ground-floor commercial spaces. Located in the north end of the building, the new post office quarters provided approximately 1,200 square feet of floor space. To ensure the facility was "up to date in every way," the contract for entirely new fixtures was awarded to the McLane Manufacturing Co. of Milford, New Hampshire. The transition was managed by Postmaster R.L. Earl. The post office operated from this location for 21 years until the completion of the federal building on West Main Street in 1941.

=== House Appropriations Bill ===
In August 1937, the House Appropriations Committee in Washington, D.C. outlined a massive public building program designed chiefly for the construction of new post offices. The bill carried a total of $23 million for public buildings, placing numerous projects on the list for immediate construction, including many in New York State cities and villages.

Within this appropriation, the sum of $70,000 was designated as ample to erect a new structure in Honeoye Falls. This allocation was part of a broader slate of funded projects for the region that included post offices in nearby communities such as Clifton Springs, Clyde, and Weedsport.

== Building ==
=== Construction ===
On January 9, 1941, the Public Buildings Administration accepted the bonds of the contracting firm Smythe & Co. of Takoma Park, Maryland, and issued an order to proceed with the work. The contract allowed 330 days for the completion of the project. Clarence R. Rogers was detailed as the construction engineer to supervise the work, while Harry Sylvester served as the representative for the construction firm.

The selected site on West Main Street was then occupied by St. Paul's Catholic Church, which had stood there for decades. Demolition of the church began in February 1941 to clear the ground for the new federal building. By August, Smythe & Co. was selling off the remainder of the old church materials, including brick, tile, used lumber, and a 40-foot steel flagpole.

Site preparation was rigorous; workmen were required to blast rock and haul out "mammoth boulders" to ensure a solid foundation. A storm sewer was also laid to empty into Honeoye Creek (Honeoye Falls Times 1941). Excavations were completed by May 1941, allowing for the pouring of concrete foundation walls. As the building neared completion in August 1941, applications were opened for maintenance staff, including a fireman-laborer position paying $1,260 annually and a part-time janitor role paying fifty cents an hour. The construction was finished two weeks ahead of the December 9 deadline.

=== Architecture ===
The Honeoye Falls Post Office is a one-story brick structure designed in the Colonial Revival style, a prevalent aesthetic for federal buildings constructed during the New Deal era. It was listed on the National Register of Historic Places on May 11, 1989. The National Register designation attributes Louis A. Simon as the Supervising Architect of the Treasury and also associates the artist Stuart Edie with the project, noting his contribution under the category of art and architecture.

The interior of the building was appointed with high-quality materials typical of federal construction. Upon its completion, the public lobby featured marble wainscoting, oak paneling, and a terrazzo floor. It was equipped with indirect lighting fixtures, four writing tables, four drop boxes, and 432 lock boxes for patron use. The postmaster's private office was furnished with a taupe rug, a large mahogany desk, and matching chairs. The floor plan covered a total area of 2,800 square feet, divided into 600 square feet for the lobby, 1,800 square feet for the main workroom, and 300 square feet for the postmaster's office.

=== Opening ===
The post office officially moved into the new federal building on Friday, November 28, 1941. The transfer of operations from the old Masonic Temple quarters took place after closing hours to ensure no interruption of service. Staff moved a wide array of equipment, including records, ledgers, mail bags, stamp stocks, money order applications, and the canceling machine.

Regular business transactions commenced the following morning, Saturday, November 29, 1941. To mark the occupancy, the American flag was raised for the first time from the flagpole on the front lawn that morning. Lyle Kreiger, a junior post office clerk, was responsible for dispatching the first early morning mail from the new facility. Despite the significance of the event, Postmaster Joseph N. Peck announced that there would be no formal dedication ceremony at the time due to the pressure of the incoming holiday mail rush. Residents, who had watched the construction progress since ground was broken in April, expressed keen interest in the opening of the "attractive brick structure." Construction Engineer C.R. Rogers noted his satisfaction that the job had been completed two weeks ahead of the December 9 contract deadline.

== Mural ==
=== Legislation ===
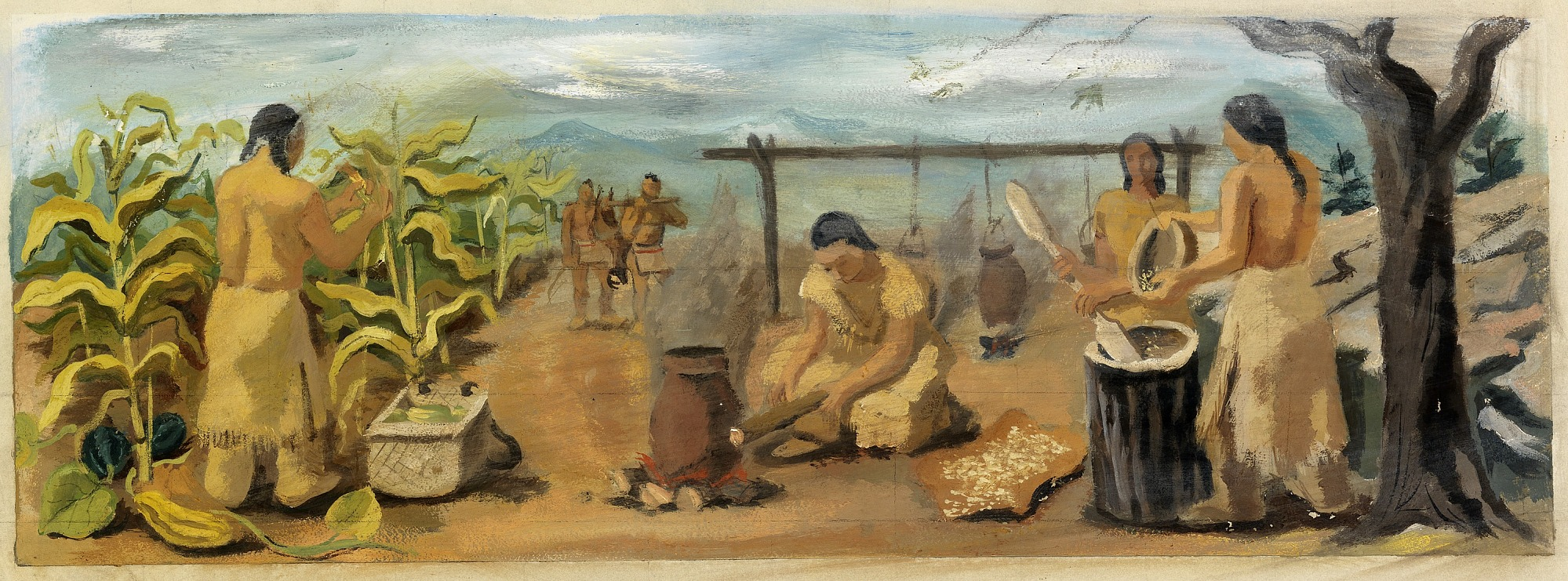
Iroquois (study for mural, Honeoye Falls, New York Post Office), located at the Smithsonian American Art Museum. The final version of Stuart Edie's mural remains in the lobby of the Honeoye Falls Post Office.

The mural in the Honeoye Falls Post Office was commissioned under the Treasury Department's Section of Fine Arts. Unlike the Works Progress Administration (WPA) relief programs, which focused primarily on employment, the Section aimed to fund high-quality public art that could uplift the national spirit and connect public spaces with local identity. The program selected artists through anonymous competitions to ensure quality, distinct from the relief-based hiring of the WPA.

=== The Artist ===
The mural was painted by Stuart Carson Edie (1908–1974), an American artist and educator. Edie was known for his work in modernist landscape and figure painting and studied under Thomas Hart Benton at the Kansas City Art Institute. A preparatory study for the Honeoye Falls mural, titled Iroquois, is currently held by the Smithsonian American Art Museum; this study, rendered in tempera and pencil, reveals Edie's intention to honor Native culture through realistic depiction rather than caricature.

=== The Mural ===
Titled The Life of the Senecas and painted in 1942, the oil-on-canvas mural is installed above the post office boxes in the lobby. Consistent with the Section's directive to depict "ordinary people engaged in daily routines," the artwork portrays the Iroquois (specifically Seneca) people in a stylized landscape, engaged in agricultural and domestic activities such as harvesting corn. The theme was chosen to honor the region's roots, specifically referencing the Seneca presence in the area and the nearby major town of Totiakton, which stood a few miles north on Honeoye Creek until its destruction in 1687.

== Postmasters ==
West Mendon (Established September 8, 1826)

- Horace Wheeler: Appointed September 8, 1826.

Honeoye Falls (Name changed March 24, 1838)

- Horace Wheeler: March 24, 1838.
- Edward Downs: June 2, 1849.
- George B. McBride: June 21, 1853.
- Moses C. Davis: March 13, 1861.
- John B. Yorks: February 17, 1865.
- Mozart H. Cutler: September 15, 1866.
- John R. Sage: June 9, 1868.
- Richard Ostrander: March 22, 1869.
- John L. Harnisch: January 21, 1884.
- James R. Green: July 23, 1885.
- William Martin: June 25, 1889.
- John F. Fitzgerald: February 28, 1894.
- William Martin: March 9, 1898.
- Marion O. Martin: February 4, 1901.
- George A. Case: May 7, 1909.
- Richard L. Earl: July 26, 1913.
- George A. Case: March 31, 1922.
- Joseph N. Peck (Acting): January 11, 1934.
- Joseph N. Peck: May 28, 1934.
- Lyle E. Kreiger (Acting): June 30, 1957.
- Lyle E. Kreiger: July 16, 1958.
- Raymond J. Michel (Officer-In-Charge): July 24, 1970.
- Raymond J. Michel: May 29, 1971.
- Earl W. Cohen (Officer-In-Charge): July 16, 1976.
- Victoria G. DePalma (Officer-In-Charge): August 13, 1977.
- Fred W. Nowack: April 22, 1978.
- Kristine A. Miller-Blazak (Officer-In-Charge): July 26, 1984.
- Gary Ringer (Officer-In-Charge): January 18, 1985.
- Anna M. Southall: September 14, 1985.
- Lynn L. Garlipp: January 1, 2000.
- Kitty K. Hatch (Officer-In-Charge): June 14, 2004.
- Carol A. Leroy: April 2, 2005.
- Rosemary Ludwig (Postmaster): July 31, 2010.
- Teresa A. Smith (Officer-In-Charge): July 11, 2013.
- Paul J. Sidoti: August 23, 2014.
