= North Bloomfield School =

- U.S. National Register of Historic Places
- Location within New York Location within the United States
- Location: 7840 Martin Rd., North Bloomfield, New York
- Coordinates: 42°56′14″N 77°34′42″W
- Area: 0.2 acres (0.081 ha)
- Built: 1827
- Architect: House, Benjamin H.; Chambers, Burton & Bond
- Architectural style: Greek Revival, Italianate
- NRHP reference No.: 81000409
- Added to NRHP: May 28, 1981

North Bloomfield School is a historic school located at North Bloomfield in Livingston County, New York. It is a two-story, painted common brick structure set on a coursed-rubble foundation and stone watertable. It was originally planned and constructed by the First Universalist Society of Lima between 1827 and 1829. The building was to be a "meeting house" for services held by the newly formed church. From 1842 the building was rented for elementary-grade classes while continuing to be used for services at other times. In the mid-19th century, the second-floor stage and Italianate cupola were added. Joint use of the building continued until 1872, when the church built a separate building. The school closed in 1951, and the building has since been remodeled into two apartments.

It was listed on the National Register of Historic Places in 1981.
