= Ogilvie Moses Farmhouse =

Historic house in New York, United States

- U.S. National Register of Historic Places
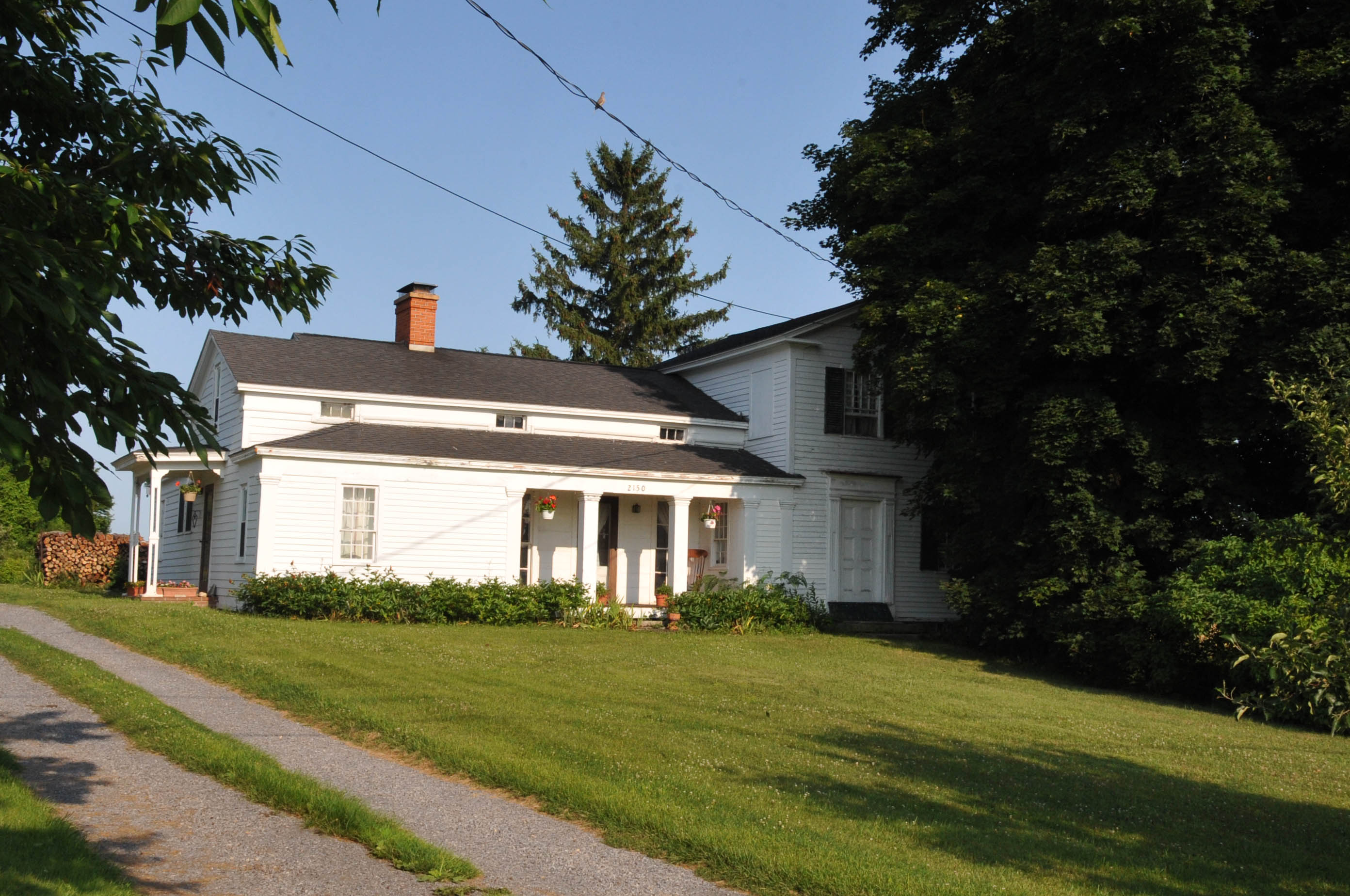

- Location within New York Location within the United States
- Location: 2150 Clay St., Lima, New York
- Coordinates: 42°53′37″N 77°35′52″W
- Area: 4.5 acres (1.8 ha)
- MPS: Lima MRA
- NRHP reference No.: 89001123
- Added to NRHP: August 31, 1989

Ogilvie Moses Farmhouse is a historic home located at Lima in Livingston County, New York. It was built during the 1830s and is an L-shaped, clapboard-sided frame farmhouse with vernacular Greek Revival style features. The building consists of a 2-story, two-bay-wide main block with a 1 1/2-story, three-bay wing on the south side. Contributing structures on the property are a smokehouse and the remains of a root cellar.

It was listed on the National Register of Historic Places in 1989.
