= Markham Cobblestone Farmhouse and Barn Complex =

Historic house in New York, United States

- U.S. National Register of Historic Places
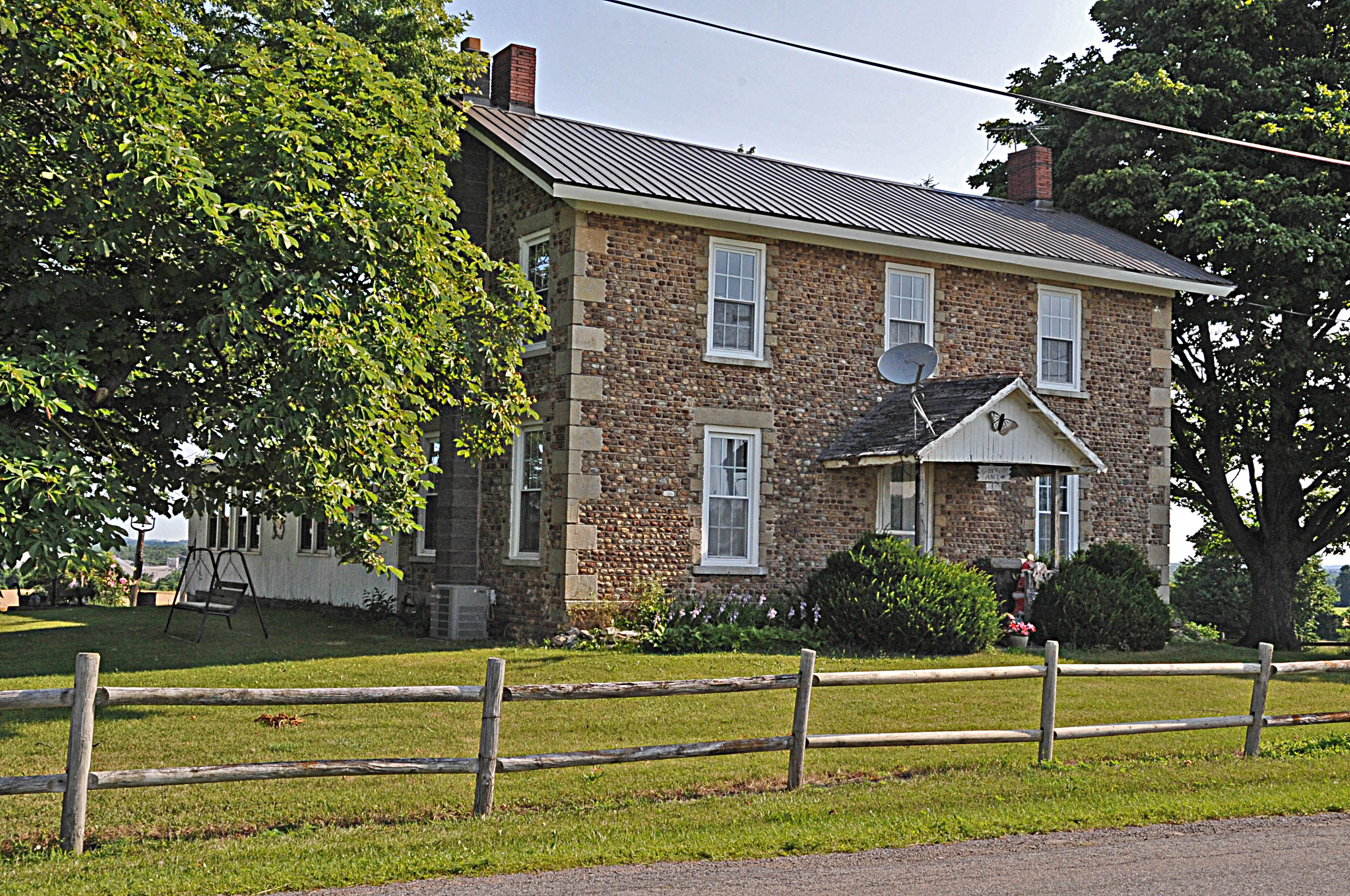

- Location within New York Location within the United States
- Location: 6857 Heath-Markham Rd., Lima, New York
- Coordinates: 42°55′56″N 77°38′11″W
- Area: 198.7 acres (80.4 ha)
- Built: 1830
- MPS: Lima MRA
- NRHP reference No.: 89001119
- Added to NRHP: August 31, 1989

Markham Cobblestone Farmhouse and Barn Complex is a historic home and barn complex located at Lima in Livingston County, New York. The home was constructed about 1832 and is a 2-story, three-bay cobblestone main block with a 1 1/2-story rear wing. It was built in the late Federal / early Greek Revival style. Also on the property are a full complement of outbuildings dating from the 19th and early 20th century, including three contributing barns, a shed, two silos, a well with pump, and the remains of a former barn.

It was listed on the National Register of Historic Places in 1989.
