= Zebulon Moses Farm Complex =

Historic house in New York, United States

- U.S. National Register of Historic Places
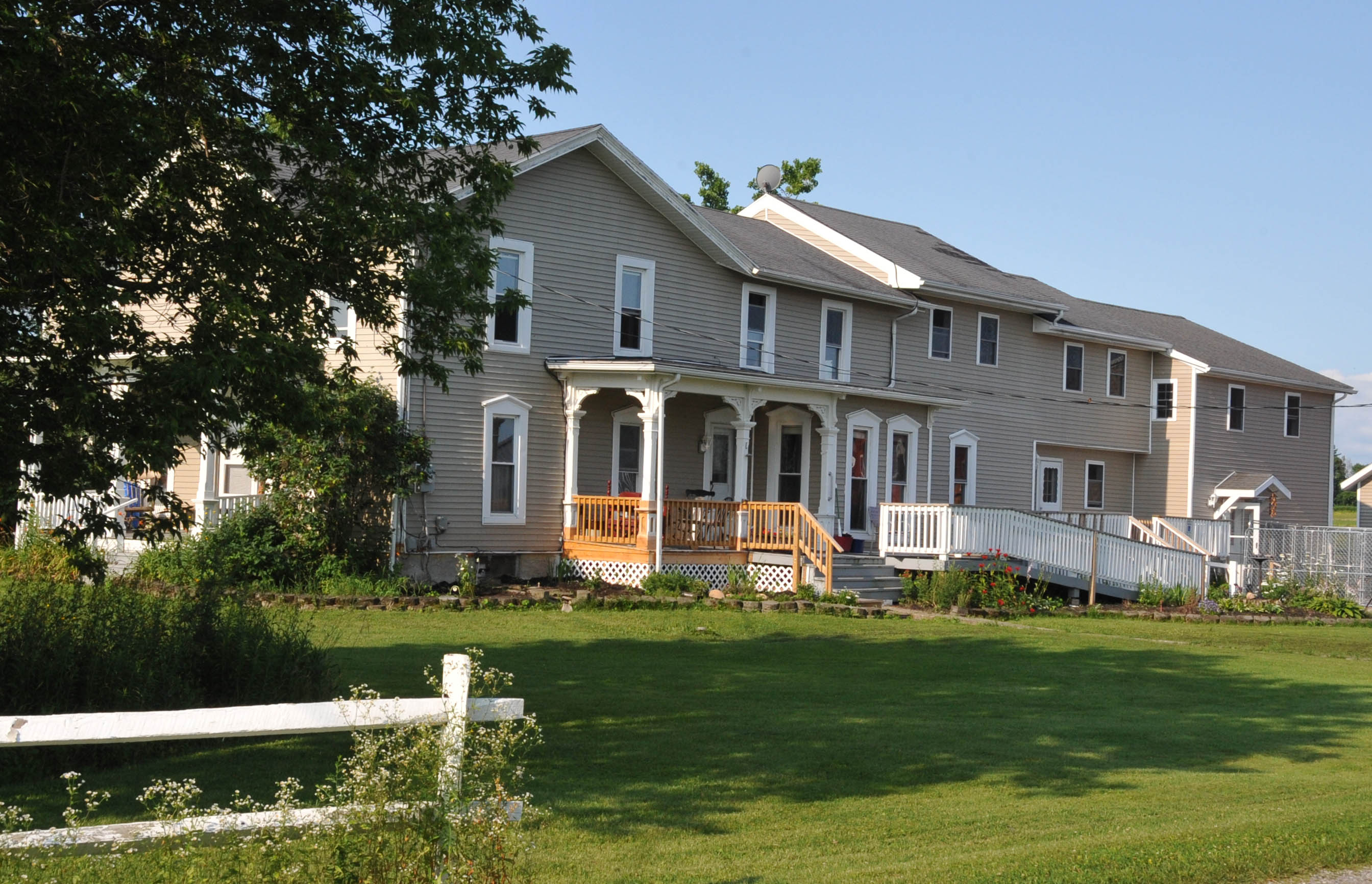

- Location within New York Location within the United States
- Location: 2770 Clay Rd., Lima, New York
- Coordinates: 42°51′56″N 77°35′32″W
- Area: 5.3 acres (2.1 ha)
- MPS: Lima MRA
- NRHP reference No.: 89001132
- Added to NRHP: August 31, 1989

Zebulon Moses Farm Complex is a historic home and farm complex located at Lima in Livingston County, New York. The farmhouse is believed to date to the early 19th century and was modernized and expanded in several stages throughout the later 19th century. It is a two-story, four-bay dwelling with three large rear appendages. The property also includes a carriage barn with an attached shed, three barns, and a machine shed.

It was listed on the National Register of Historic Places in 1989.
