= Thomas Peck Farmhouse =

Historic house in New York, United States

- U.S. National Register of Historic Places
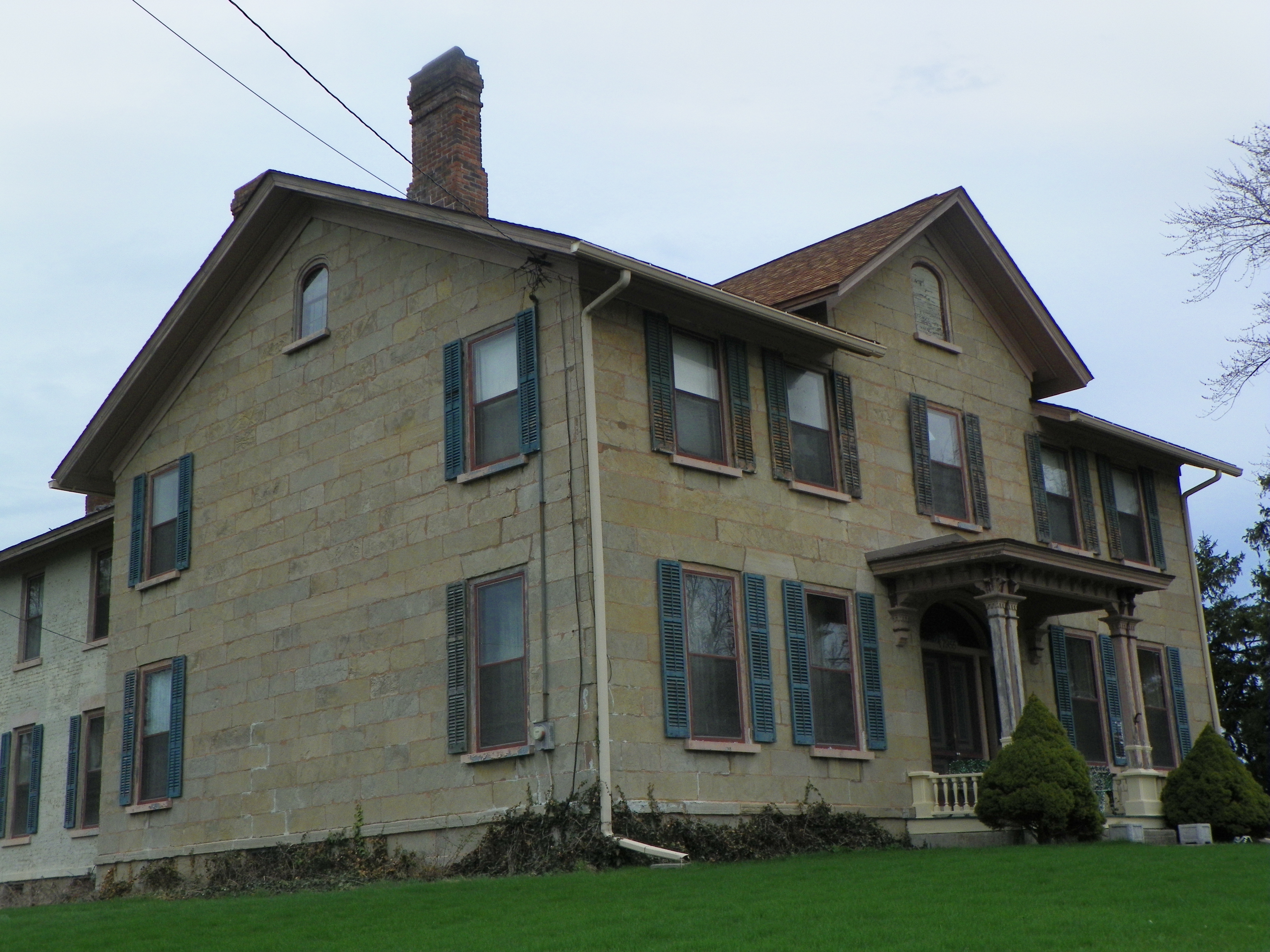

- Location within New York Location within the United States
- Location: 7955 E. Main Rd., Lima
- Coordinates: 42°54′34″N 77°34′21″W
- Area: 5.6 acres (2.3 ha)
- Architectural style: Gothic Revival
- MPS: Lima MRA
- NRHP reference No.: 89001137
- Added to NRHP: August 31, 1989

Thomas Peck Farmhouse is a historic home located at Lima in Livingston County, New York. It was built about 1812 and remodeled sometime between the 1860s and 1880s. It is a two-story, five bay Federal style stone building with late 19th century Italianate and Gothic Revival inspired design features. The house is built of fieldstone and faced in cut limestone. Also on the property are three contributing dependencies and one contributing site: a privy, an ice house, a guest / tenant house, and the remains of a former barn complex.

It was listed on the National Register of Historic Places in 1989.
