= Godfrey House and Barn Complex =

Historic house in New York, United States

- U.S. National Register of Historic Places
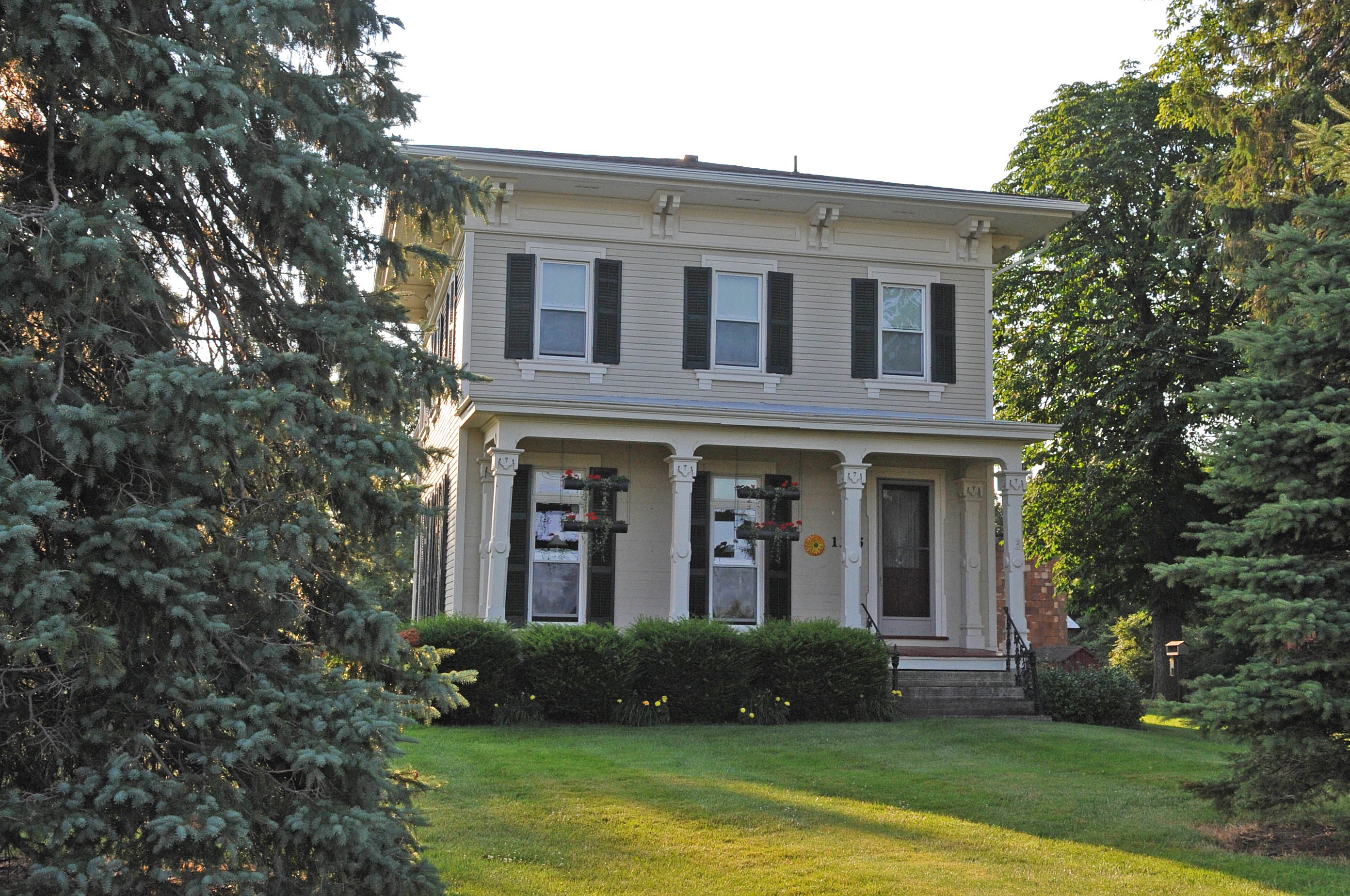

- Location within New York Location within the United States
- Location: 1325 Rochester Rd., Lima, New York
- Coordinates: 42°55′41″N 77°36′42″W
- Area: 4.7 acres (1.9 ha)
- Architectural style: Italianate
- MPS: Lima MRA
- NRHP reference No.: 89001134
- Added to NRHP: August 31, 1989

Godfrey House and Barn Complex is a historic home and barn complex located at Lima in Livingston County, New York. The farmhouse was built in about 1853 and is a two-story, three bay wide by three bay deep, frame Italianate style dwelling. In addition to the farmhouse, there are four contributing buildings and two structures dating from the 1850s to the 1930s. They include two barns, a milk house, a chicken house, garage, and a silo.

It was listed on the National Register of Historic Places in 1989.
