= Martin Farm Complex =

Historic house in New York, United States

- U.S. National Register of Historic Places
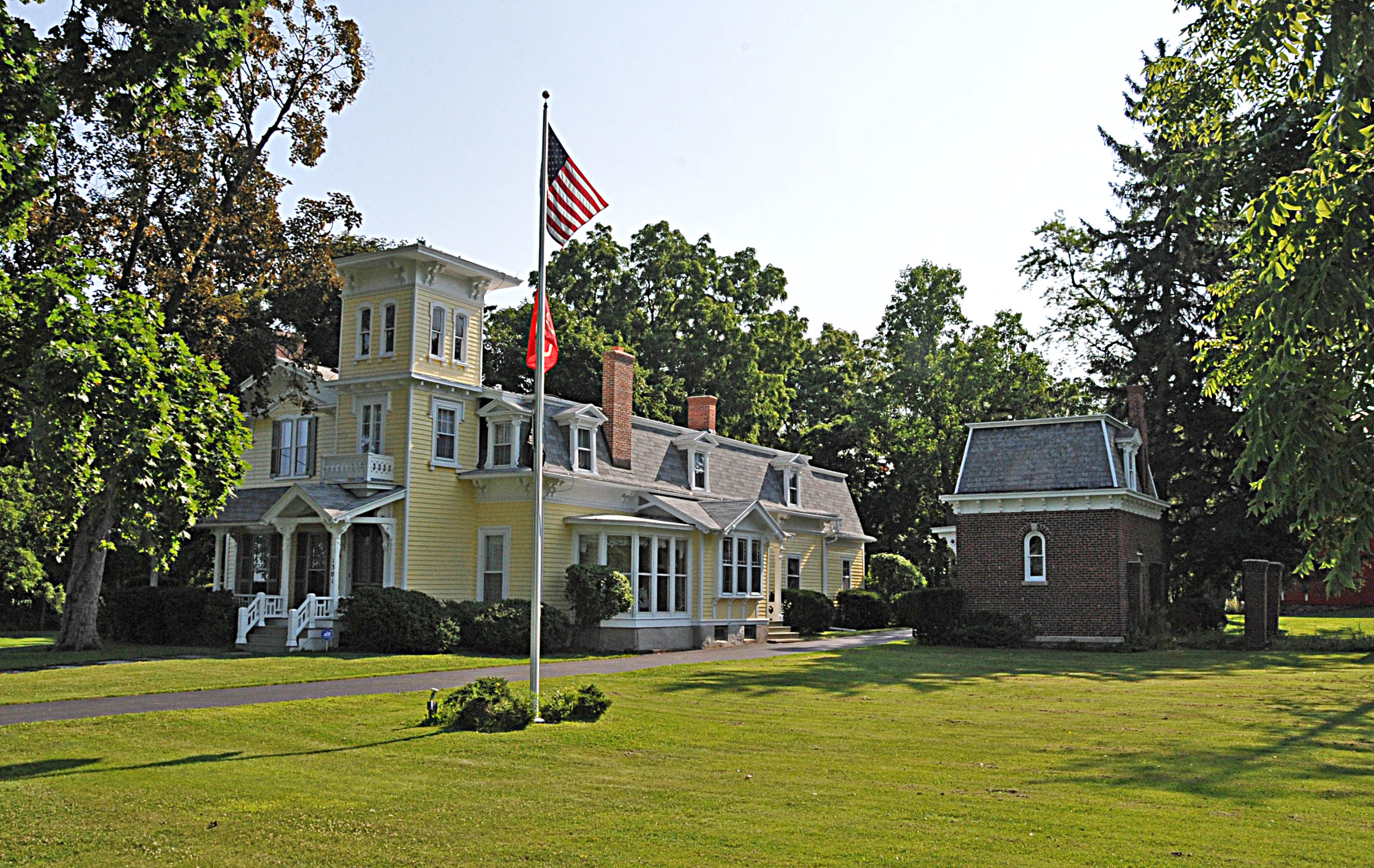

- Location within New York Location within the United States
- Location: 1301 Bragg St., Lima, New York
- Coordinates: 42°55′50″N 77°34′36″W
- Area: 7.3 acres (3.0 ha)
- Architectural style: Italian Villa
- MPS: Lima MRA
- NRHP reference No.: 89001136
- Added to NRHP: August 31, 1989

Martin Farm Complex is a historic home and farm complex located at Lima in Livingston County, New York. The complex consists of a gentleman farmer's Italian villa farmhouse along with a full complement of contributing agricultural outbuildings. In addition to the farmhouse, there are eleven contributing buildings, two structures, one site, and four objects dating from the mid-19th century to the 1930s. They include a brick office building, milk house, sheds, privy, carriage barn, chicken house, four barns, a pergola, smoke house, cast iron fence, stepping stone, and two hitching posts.

It was listed on the National Register of Historic Places in 1989.
