= 1776 Connecticut gubernatorial election =

- April 11, 1776
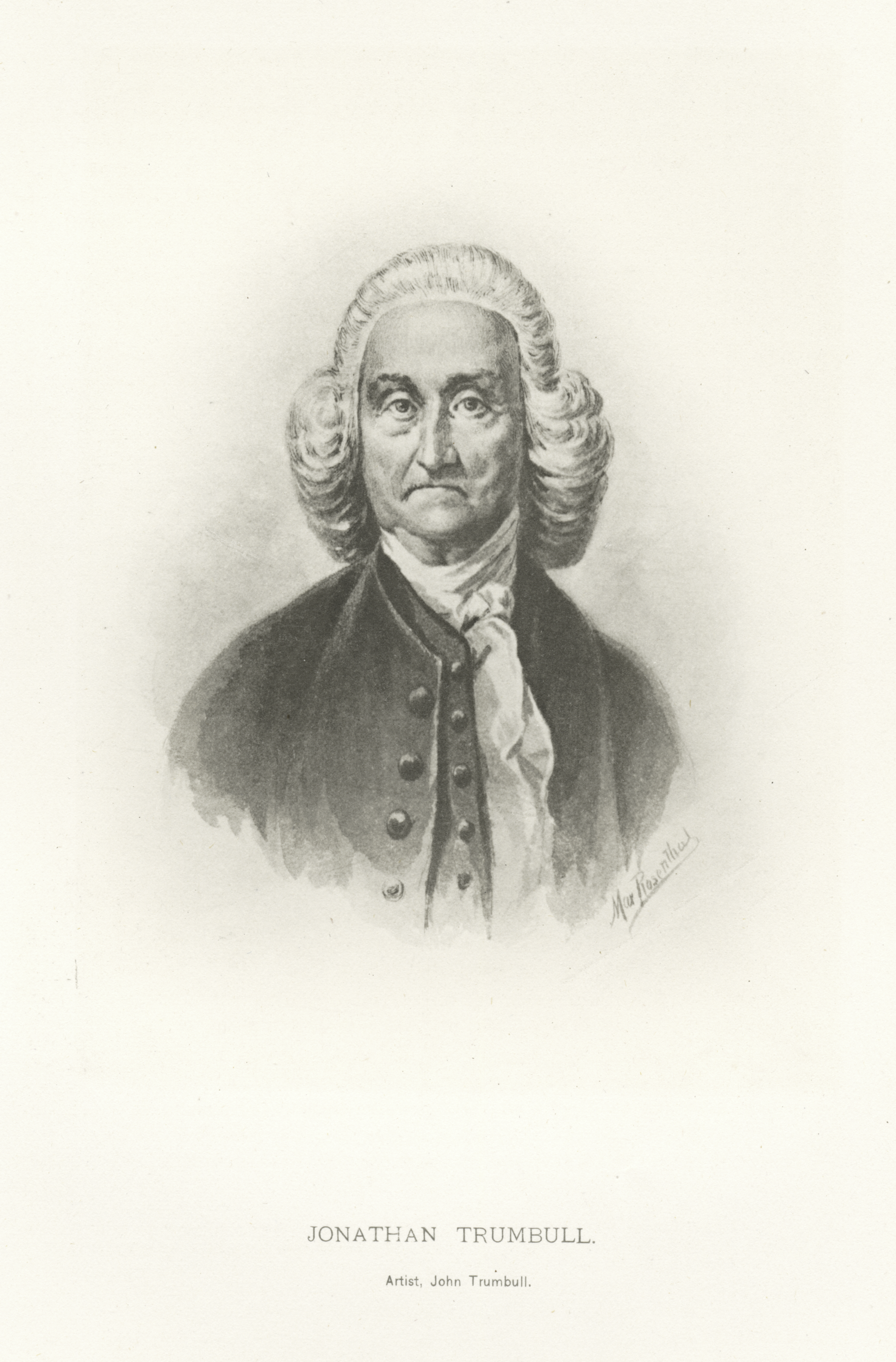
Nominee	Jonathan Trumbull

The 1776 Connecticut gubernatorial election took place on April 11, 1776; the offices to be filled were governor and lieutenant governor. This was the only such election to take place before Connecticut approved the Declaration of Independence on October 10, 1776.

Statesman Jonathan Trumbull won the election. Trumbull had been governor of the Connecticut Colony prior to the American Revolution. The candidate for Lieutenant Governor in 1776 was Matthew Griswold, who also won his election. Trumbull went on to win successive gubernatorial elections until 1784, when he was succeeded by Griswold. Election returns are unknown.
