= Leech–Lloyd Farmhouse and Barn Complex =

Historic house in New York, United States

- U.S. National Register of Historic Places
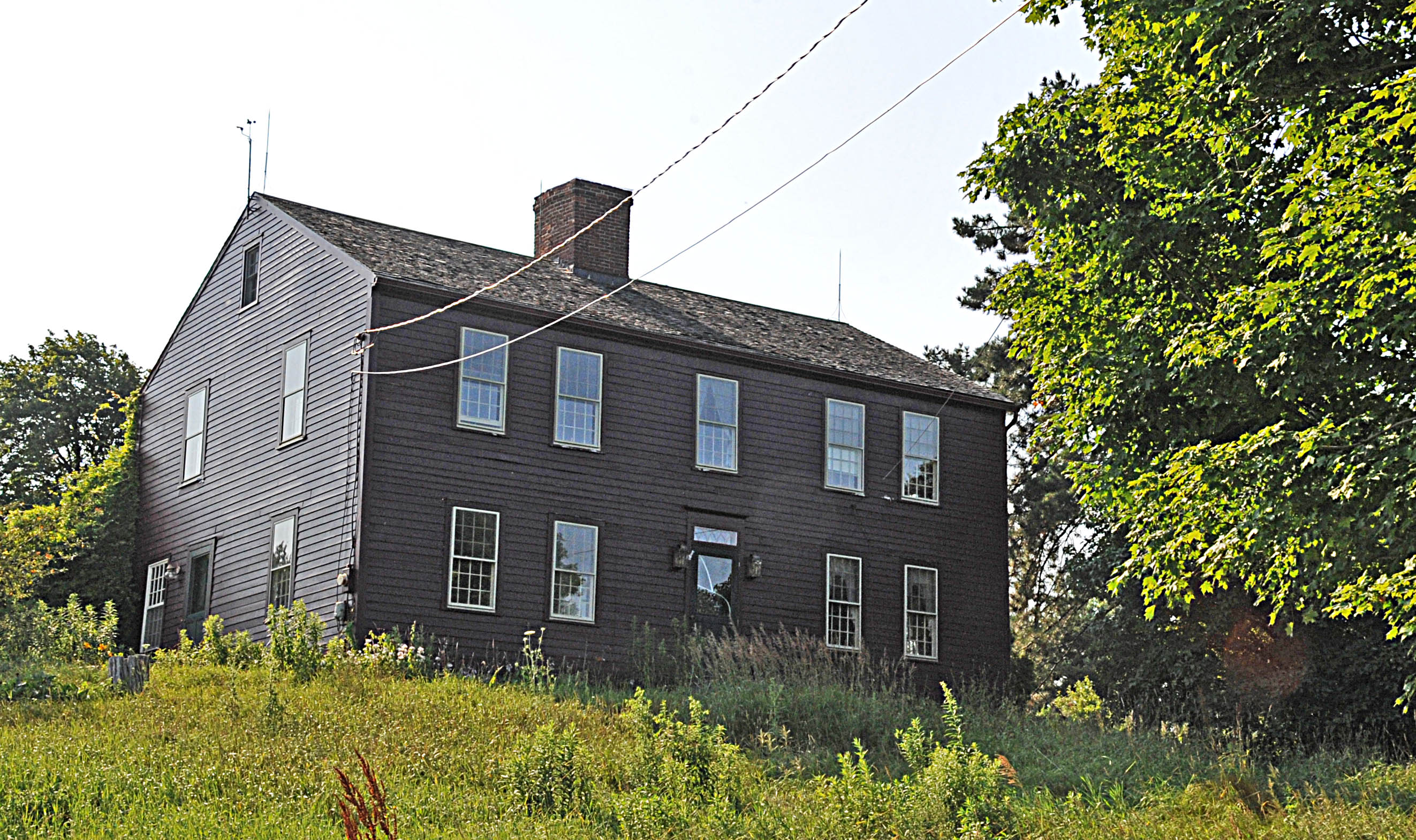

- Location within New York Location within the United States
- Location: 1589 and 1601 York St., Lima, New York
- Coordinates: 42°55′0″N 77°35′31″W
- Area: 1.3 acres (0.53 ha)
- Built: 1800
- Architect: Leech, Manasseh
- MPS: Lima MRA
- NRHP reference No.: 89001117
- Added to NRHP: August 31, 1989

Leech–Lloyd Farmhouse and Barn Complex is a historic home located at Lima in Livingston County, New York. The farmhouse was built about 1800 and is a two-story, five bay frame residence dating to the settlement period. The barn complex was demolished in May 1989.

It was listed on the National Register of Historic Places in 1989.
