= Cheadle Lower Mill =

Former mill in Cheadle, Greater Manchester, England

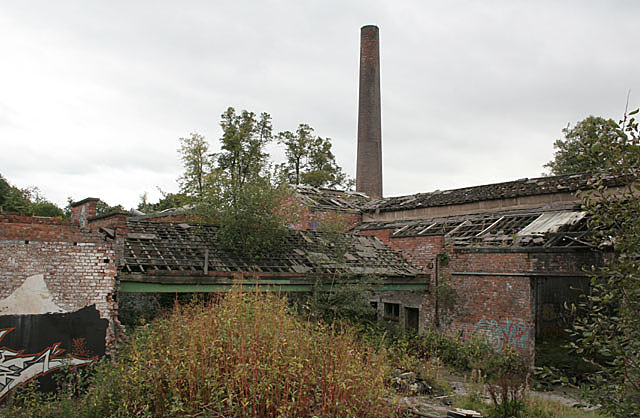
- Derelict Cheadle Lower Mill

- Location within Greater Manchester

General information
- Location: Cheadle, Greater Manchester, England
- Coordinates: 53.397816°N 2.218845°W

Cheadle Lower Mill, often called Cheadle Bleachworks, and now renamed, The Bleachworks, is a former mill in Cheadle, Greater Manchester, England (grid reference SJ854890). A mill has been on the site since the 12th century, originally used as a water-powered corn mill. It was later converted to a chemical plant, owned by Thor Chemicals, and produced chlorine bleaching agents for use in the dye industry in Manchester at the time. It closed down in 1993 and was left derelict until 2008 when it was partially demolished prior to being converted into housing.

== Redevelopment ==
In 2005, the mill was described by Stockport Council as a "derelict shell, open to elements". It was left in such a condition until it was bought by Hamptons for development in 2007. In early 2008, work was started by JCS Homes to turn the complex into a housing estate with apartments and town houses. The buildings were partially demolished and old bricks were saved to be reused in the creation of new buildings. JCS Homes also gave buyers the opportunity to design the interior of their homes themselves. As of early June 2008, construction has not begun on the new houses.

In June 2017, the mill caught fire and burnt down, with four partially built houses also damaged by the fire.
