= Lower Mill (Honeoye Falls, New York) =

- U.S. National Register of Historic Places
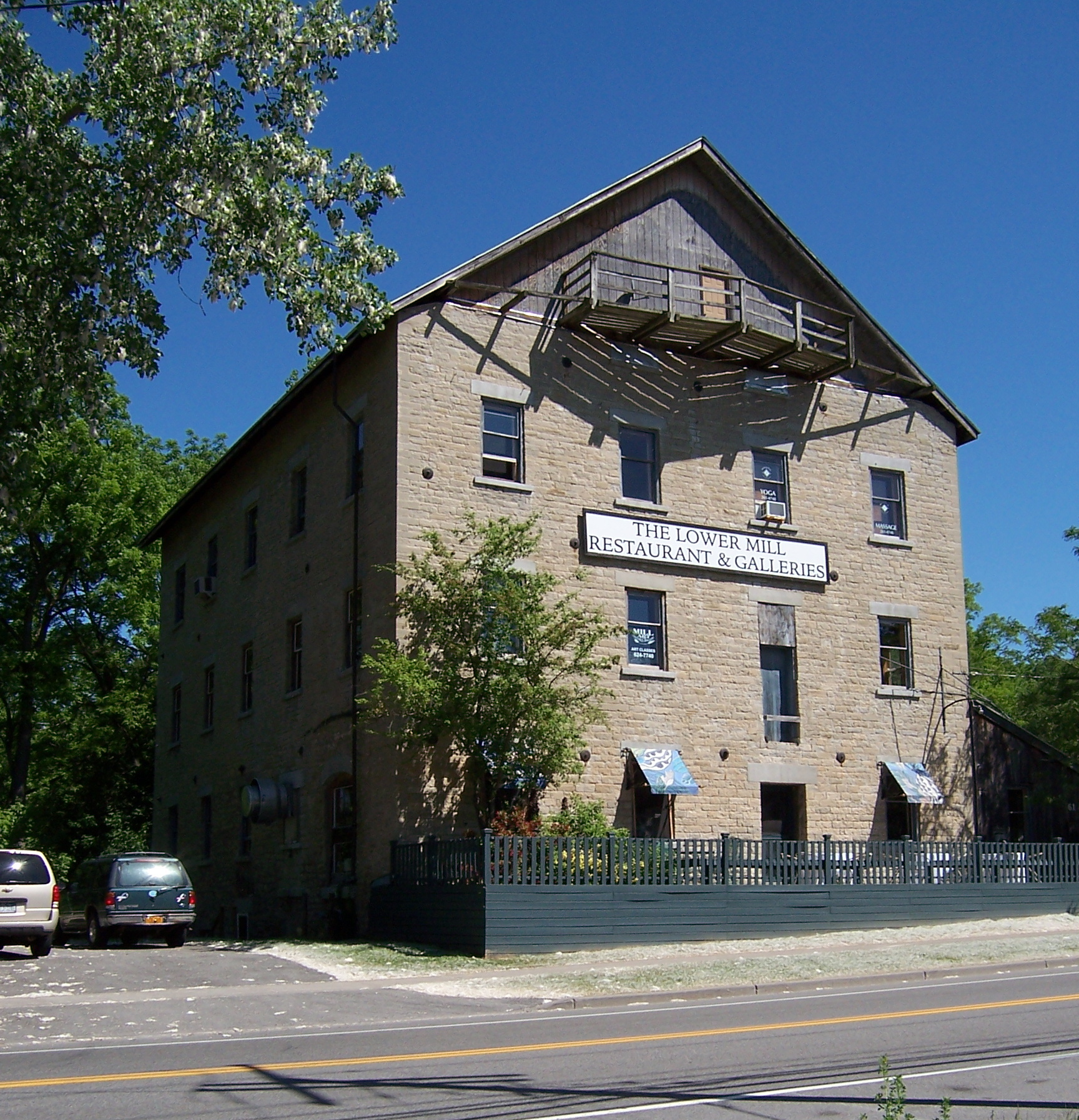
- The Lower Mill in May 2010

- Location within New York Location within the United States
- Location: 61 N. Main St., Honeoye Falls, New York
- Coordinates: 42°57′21.5″N 77°35′19.7″W
- Area: less than one acre
- Built: 1829
- NRHP reference No.: 73001200
- Added to NRHP: May 17, 1973

Lower Mill is a historic grist mill located at Honeoye Falls in Monroe County, New York, USA. The 3- to 4 1/2-story stone structure was built about 1829. The mill operated into the 1930s, and the structure was subsequently used by a creamery, oil company, and for community use. A restaurant and gallery now operates in the structure.

It was listed on the National Register of Historic Places in 1973.
