= Honeoye Falls–Lima High School =

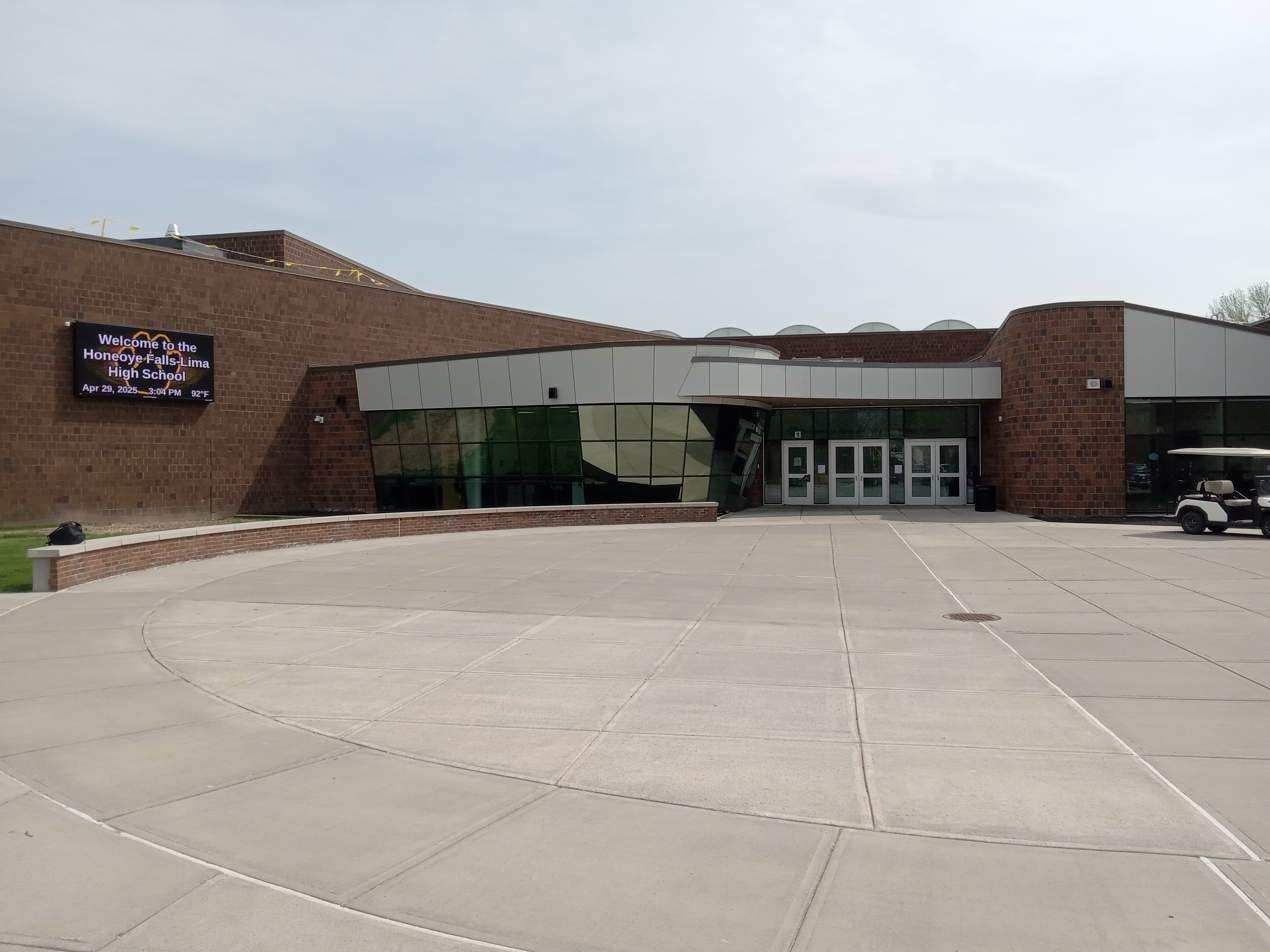
- Main entrance to school

Location
- 83 East Street; Honeoye Falls, (Monroe County), New York 14472; United States; 42.9514°N 77.5873°W

Information
- Type: Public
- Established: 1969
- School district: Honeoye Falls-Lima Central School District
- Superintendent: Gene Mancuso
- Principal: Sarah Jacob
- Teaching staff: 57.19 (FTE)
- Grades: 9–12
- Average class size: 197
- Student to teacher ratio: 12.85
- Campus: Rural
- Colors: Black and Gold
- Team name: Cougars
- Rival: Batavia
- National ranking: 360
- Publication: Cougar Pride
- Yearbook: Liaison
- Website: www.high.hflcsd.org/o/hflhs

Honeoye Falls–Lima High School (HF–L) is a public high school located 14 miles (23 km) south of the city of Rochester in the village of Honeoye Falls, New York, United States.

== Awards and recognition ==
In 2016, the Honeoye Falls–Lima High School was named a National Blue Ribbon School by the U.S. Department of Education.

The school was ranked 360th in the country (a Gold Medal School) by U.S. News & World Report in its 2017 high school rankings. The school was also ranked 44th in New York High Schools and 140th in STEM High Schools. The school has been consistently listed as a Gold Medal School.

The school was ranked in 411th place nationwide in Newsweek's 2013 America's Best High Schools, listing the Top 2,000 High Schools in The United States.

== Curriculum ==
Every student at Honeoye Falls-Lima is involved in a college preparatory curriculum. Honors and Advanced Placement sections exist in each of the curricular disciplines.

== Athletics ==
HF–L has taken part in the sectional and state tournaments of the New York State Public High School Athletic Association since 1978. In the fall season, HF–L offers football, volleyball, soccer, girls' tennis, and cross country. In the winter season it offers wrestling, basketball, hockey, alpine skiing, Nordic skiing, and swimming. In the spring season, HF–L offers baseball, golf, lacrosse, boys' tennis, softball, and track and field. The rowing team competes in both the fall and spring seasons.
