= Totiakton =

Town of the Seneca people

Coordinates: 42.982°N 77.595°W

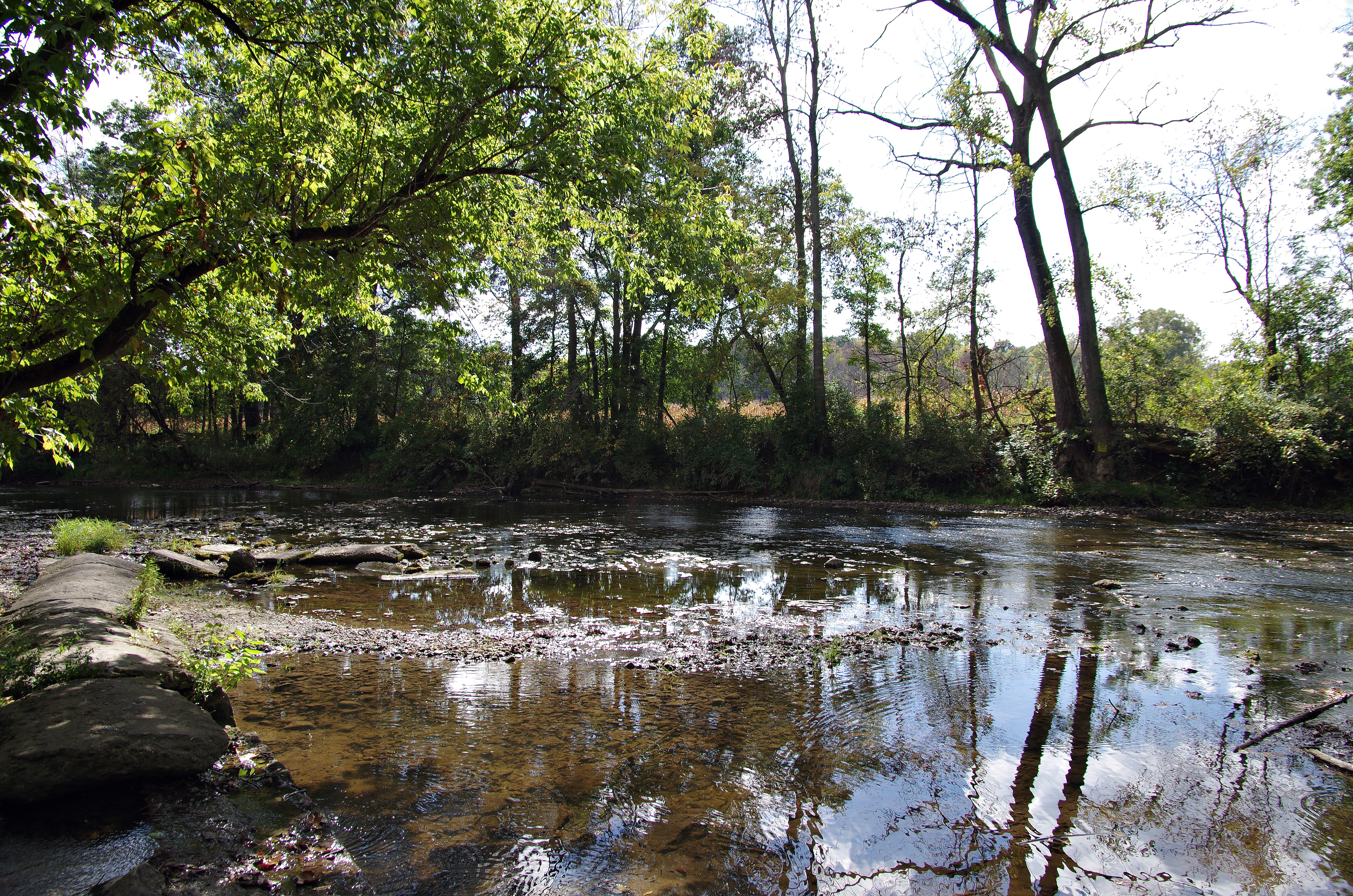
Totiakton Site

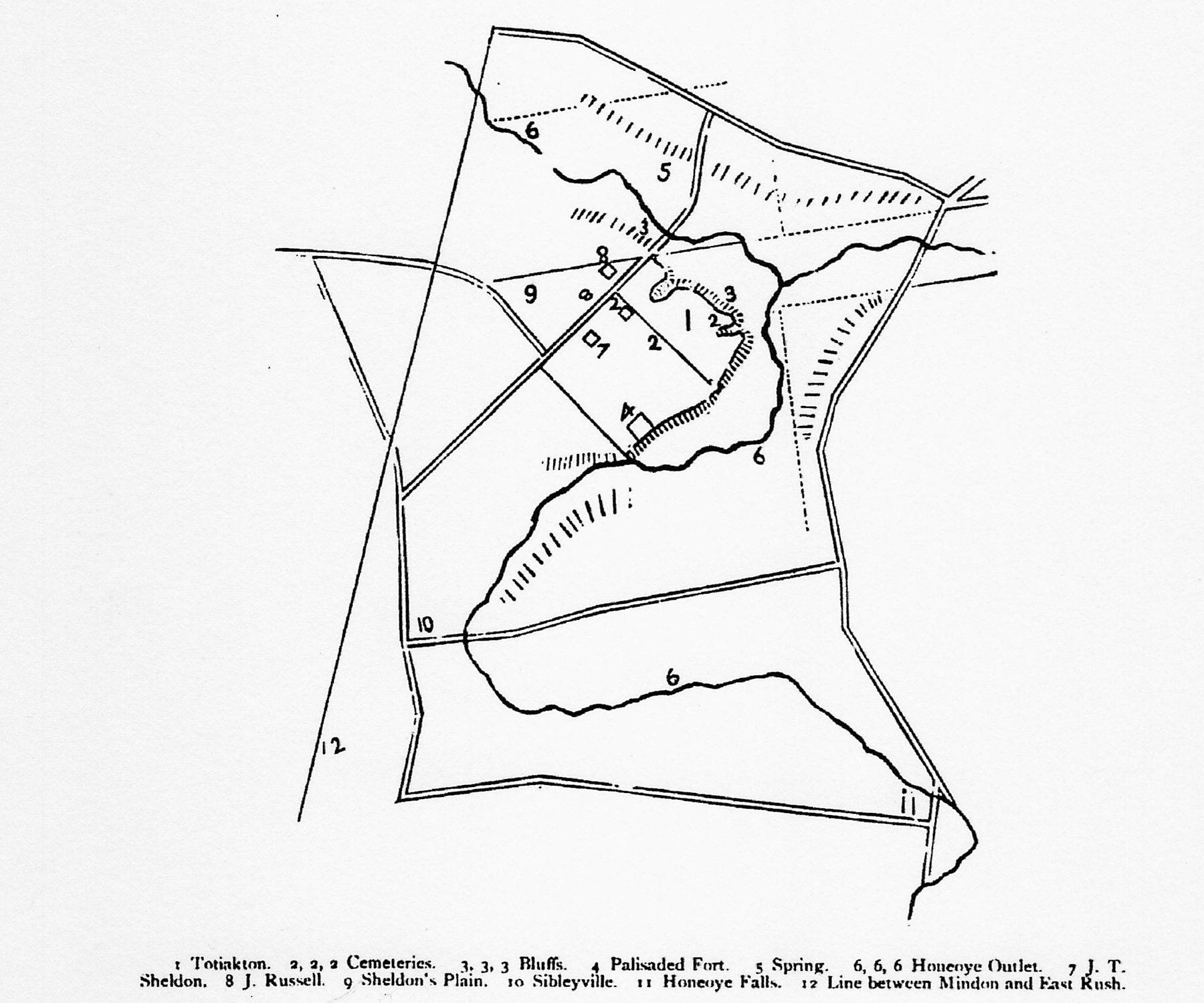
Map of Totiakton and environs in 1884

Totiakton, known in Seneca as Dejódiha:’kdö:h, was a Haudenosaunee town of the Seneca people located in the present-day town of Mendon, New York. It is located "on the northernmost bend of Honeoye outlet" two miles from the current village of Honeoye Falls. The Seneca name for the town, also transcribed as "De-yu-di-haak-doh", literally meant “the bend" and described the town's location at a bend of Honeoye Creek.The archaeological remains of the site are listed on the National Register of Historic Places.

== History ==
"The ancient town was located on the table land which projects into the west side of the valley in the form of a bold bluff, facing the east, at an elevation of about one hundred and fifty feet above the water." The town occupied an area of 15 acres (61,000 m^{2}) (Peck says 25 acres) and is estimated to have held 4000 people.

In 1667, a visitor, Wentworth Greenhalgh, described the town as follows— the houses mentioned would have been the traditional Haudenosaunee longhouse:

Tiotehatton lyes on the brinke or edge of a hill, has not much cleared ground, is neare the river Tiotehatton, which signifies ‘bending;’ itt lyes to westward of Canagorah about thirty miles, contains about one hundred and twenty houses, being ye largest of all ye houses wee saw, ye ordinary being about fifty or sixty feet and some one hundred and thirty or one hundred and forty foott long, with thirteen or fourteen fires in one house, they have a good store of corne growing about a mile to ye northward of the towne.

Totiakton was the site of a French Jesuit mission, led by Father Jacques Frémin, between 1668 and 1673. The Jesuits built a small chapel dedicated to the Immaculate Conception (La Conception).

The French explorer La Salle visited the town twice, the first time in 1669, and again about ten years later.

In 1687, the Governor of New France, Marquis de Denonville, destroyed the town during his expedition against the Seneca. It appears that following the destruction a small palisaded temporary village of about .5 acres (0.20 ha) was constructed at the site prior to the remaining population moving elsewhere. Previously Seneca towns had not been defended by a palisade.

In 1802, the site was purchased by Abner Sheldon, who did some exploration. In 1898 the farm was owned by Sheldon's descendant, Antoinette and her husband, William J. Kirkpatrick of Rochester, New York. In 1925 Kirkpatrick sold the property to Louis Desmann, whose family continued to farm until 1979. A large part of the property was sold to neighbors of Totiakton, but 39 acres (16 ha) were donated to the Seneca Nation.

== See also ==
- Ganondagan State Historic Site
