= Honeoye Falls–Lima Central School District =

School district in New York, United States

Honeoye Falls-Lima Central School District
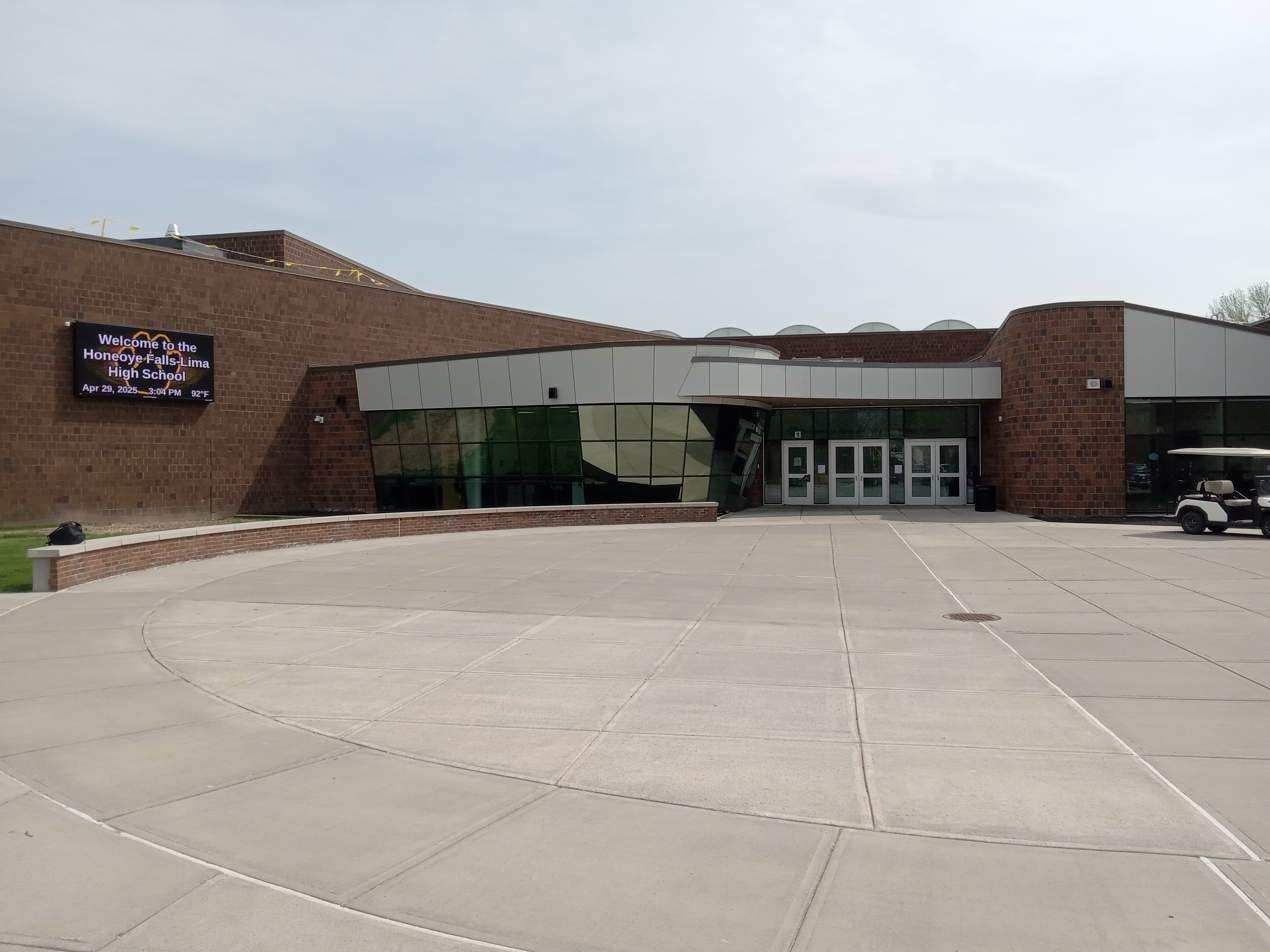
- Main entrance to district's high school

Location
- 20 Church Street; Honeoye Falls, NY 14472 Parts of Monroe, Livingston, and Ontario Counties United States
- Coordinates: 42.9507°N 77.6036°W

District information
- Type: Public
- Motto: "Education is the Foundation for Success"
- Grades: K–12
- Established: 1969
- Superintendent: Gene Mancuso
- Accreditation: New York State Education Department
- Schools: Lima Primary School (K–1); Manor Intermediate School (2–5); Honeoye Falls–Lima Middle School (6-8); Honeoye Falls–Lima Senior High School (9–12)
- Budget: $45,016,000 (2013–2014)
- NCES District ID: 3614700

Students and staff
- Students: 2,298 (2014–2015)
- Teachers: 184 (2014–2015)
- Staff: 413 (2014–2015)
- Student–teacher ratio: 12.49 (2014–2015)

Other information
- Website: www.hflcsd.org

The Honeoye Falls–Lima Central School District (HFLCSD) serves a student population of 2,748 in New York State. The district includes four schools located on separate sites: Lima Elementary (K–5), Manor Intermediate (K–5), Honeoye Falls–Lima Middle School (6–8), and Honeoye Falls–Lima High School (9–12).

Gene Mancuso is the Superintendent of Schools. The HFLCSD comprises 74 square miles (190 km^{2}) and nine towns in three counties: Monroe (Mendon, Henrietta and Rush), Livingston (Avon, Lima and Livonia), and Ontario (Victor, West Bloomfield and Richmond). The Honeoye Falls–Lima Central School District was established in 1969 through a merger of the neighboring Honeoye Falls and Lima school districts.

== Board of education ==
The Board of Education consists of nine non-paid, elected members who reside in the Honeoye Falls–Lima Central School District. Elections are held each May for board members and to vote on the school district's budget.

== Schools ==
=== Elementary schools ===
- Lima Primary School (K–1) Principal: Allison Cimmerer
- Manor Intermediate School (2-5) Principal: Joelle Weaver

=== Middle school ===
- Honeoye Falls–Lima Middle School (6–8) Principal: Alexandra Tasber; Assistant Principal: Rob Sanford

=== High school ===
- Honeoye Falls–Lima High School (9–12) Principal: Sarah Jacob; Assistant Principals: Jackie Davern and Christian Ballet
