= William Blades (politician) =

American politician

Member of the Michigan House of Representatives from the Genesee County district
- In office January 3, 1848 – April 3, 1848

Personal details
- Born: September 27, 1798 Worcester County, Maryland
- Died: March 14, 1877 (aged 78) Flint, Michigan
- Party: Whig; Republican

William Blades (September 27, 1798 – March 14, 1877) was a Michigan politician and preacher.

== Early life ==
Blades was born in Worcester County, Maryland, on September 27, 1798. Blades learned hattery. In 1828, Blades moved away Maryland because of his aversion to slavery. Blades first moved to Newark, New Jersey, then East Avon, New York, until finally moving to Genesee County, Michigan, in 1835. He lived in Grand Blanc until around 1845, where he then moved to Flint.

== Career ==
From around 1852 until his death, Blades served as an active Methodist Episcopal preacher, and was said to have "married and buried" more people than anyone else in the county. Blades served as justice of the peace from 1835 to 1845. Blades served as Genesee County sheriff from 1844 to 1846. On November 1, 1847, Blades was elected to the Michigan House of Representatives where he represented the Genesee County district from January 3, 1848, to April 3, 1848. During his time in the legislature, Blades was a member of the Whig Party. Later, he was a Republican. In his later years, Blades served as a superintendent of the poor.

== Personal life ==
Williams Blades had a son named Francis Asbury Blades, who also served as a preacher.

== Death ==
Blades died on March 14, 1877, in Flint.
