= East Avon, New York =

- Census-designated place
- Location within New York Location within the United States
- Coordinates: 42°54′32″N 77°42′22″W
- Country: United States
- State: New York
- County: Livingston
- Town: Avon

Area
  - Total: 1.31 sq mi (3.40 km^{2})
  - Land: 1.31 sq mi (3.40 km^{2})
  - Water: 0 sq mi (0.00 km^{2})
- Elevation: 825 ft (251 m)

Population (2020)
  - Total: 618
  - Density: 471/sq mi (181.8/km^{2})
- Time zone: UTC-5 (Eastern (EST))
  - Summer (DST): UTC-4 (EDT)
- ZIP Code: 14414 (Avon)
- Area code: 585
- FIPS code: 36-21600
- GNIS feature ID: 948968

East Avon is a hamlet and census-designated place (CDP) in the town of Avon, Livingston County, New York, United States. As of the 2020 census, East Avon had a population of 618.

== History ==
The First Presbyterian Church of Avon, at the northeast corner of the central intersection in the hamlet, was added to the National Register of Historic Places in 2005.

== Geography ==
East Avon is in northern Livingston County, in the northeastern part of the town of Avon. U.S. Route 20 and New York State Route 5 pass concurrently through the community, leading west 2 miles (3 km) to the village of Avon and east 5 miles (8 km) to Lima. State Route 15 crosses Routes 20 and 5 in the center of East Avon, leading south 5 miles (8 km) to Lakeville and north 19 miles (31 km) to Rochester. Interstate 390 passes 0.5 miles (0.8 km) east of East Avon, with access from Exit 10 onto Routes 20 and 5. I-390 leads north to Rochester and south 54 miles (87 km) to Interstate 86 in Avoca.

According to the U.S. Census Bureau, the East Avon CDP has an area of 1.3 square miles (3.4 km^{2}), all land.

== Demographics ==
Historical population
Census	Pop.	Note	%±
2020	618		—
U.S. Decennial Census
