= Rochester & Genesee Valley Railroad Museum =

- Established: 1971
- Location: Industry, New York
- Type: Railroad museum
- Website: http://www.rgvrrm.org

The Rochester and Genesee Valley Railroad Museum (RGVRRM) is an operating railroad museum located in Industry, New York, a hamlet within the town of Rush. The museum started in 1971 with the purchase of a former Erie Railroad commuter rail station from the Erie Lackawanna Railroad. Since then the museum has grown to include a one-mile demonstration railroad, connecting it with the New York Museum of Transportation in Rush, making it one of the few operating railroad museums in New York State.

The museum was formerly an operation of the Rochester Chapter National Railway Historical Society until 2011. The organization rosters more than 40 pieces of historic railroad equipment, including diesel and steam locomotives, electric trolley and multiple-unit cars, freight cars, cabooses, passenger cars, and work equipment. The museum campus includes a number of preserved railroad structures, including the 1909 Industry Depot built by the Erie Railroad, a waiting shelter from the Rochester, Lockport & Buffalo Railroad, and a crossing watchman's shanty from the New York Central. Train rides are operated and the museum is open to the public on select weekends from June through October, and is staffed entirely by volunteers.

== History ==
=== Site history ===
The site of the RGVRRM has been home to railroading since 1851, the year when the Rochester and Genesee Valley Railroad was chartered. This depot served the nearby village of Scottsville, approximately three miles to the west, from 1853 to 1874. The depot provided the village with daily mail, express, and passenger service by means of an omnibus. In 1858 the Rochester and Genesee Valley Railroad was leased to the Buffalo, New York & Erie Railroad, which in turn was controlled by the Erie Railway. By 1874 the Rochester and State Line Railroad reached the village of Scottsville proper, and the Erie depot became less attractive to local citizens. The Rochester and State Line would eventually become part of the Baltimore & Ohio, and currently, as of 1986, operated as Rochester and Southern Railroad.

In the early part of the 20th century, the Erie electrified the line from downtown Rochester to Mount Morris, NY. This was the only part of the Erie that was electrified. The 34-mile electric line was put into service on June 18, 1907. The route from Rochester to Mount Morris was covered in about an hour and ten minutes, and hourly service was provided from 6:00am to 11:30pm. The improvements never managed to pay for themselves, and electric service was discontinued in 1934.

Passenger service ended in September 1941, though many freight customers remained on the line. Industry depot was used as a freight agency until the mid-1950s when it was closed and the building was used for storage. In 1960 the Erie merged with the Delaware, Lackawanna and Western Railroad to form the Erie Lackawanna Railroad. As a result of general economic downturn and the devastation in the aftermath of 1972's Hurricane Agnes, Erie Lackawanna became a part of Conrail 1976. In 1996, the short line Livonia, Avon and Lakeville Railroad acquired the route north of Avon and continues to operate the former Erie branch today.

Throughout the railroads' presence, the depot has had several names. At first it was named Scottsville, for the nearby village. Once a railroad was built through Scottsville, the name of the depot was changed to Oatka, named for Oatka Creek, which flows into the nearby Genesee River. In 1902, the "State Agricultural & Industrial School," a school for troubled boys, relocated to the Town of Rush. When the current depot was constructed in about 1909, the name was changed to Industry, to reflect the small community that the School had created.

=== Museum history ===
Industry
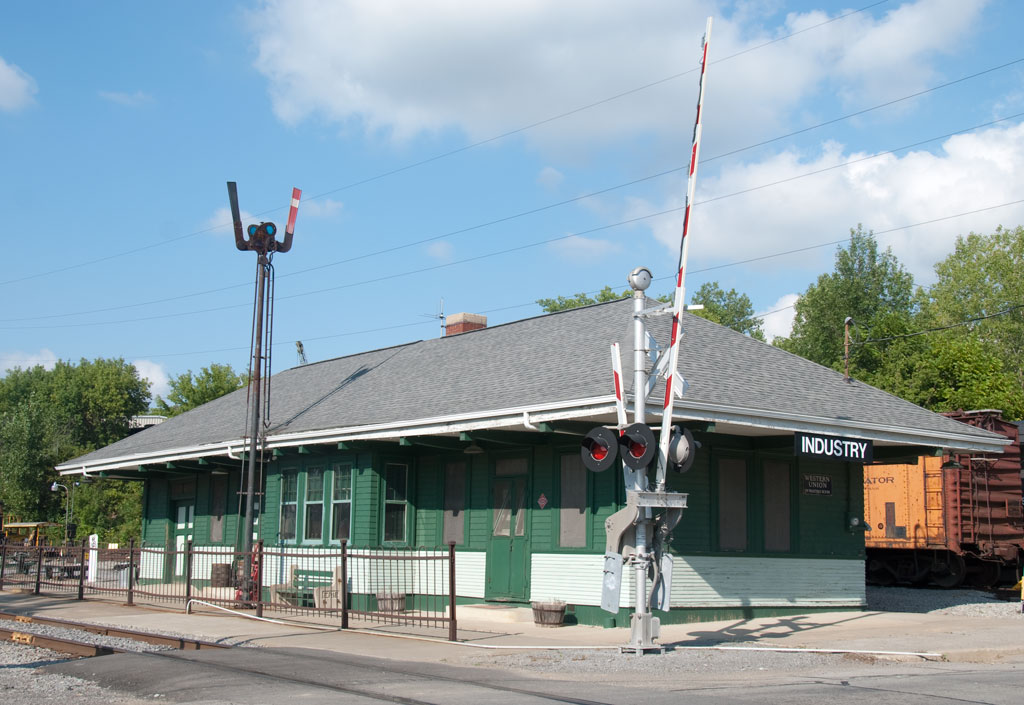
- The former Erie Railroad depot in 2010. The semaphore train order signal and milepost denoting the length to Jersey City, New Jersey are visible.

General information
- Location: 282 Rush Scottsville Road (NY 251), Rush, New York 14543
- Coordinates: 43.0035°N 77.721°W
- Owner: Erie Railroad
- Line: Rochester Branch
- Platforms: 1 side platform
- Tracks: 1

Other information
- Station code: 3975 (Erie Railroad)

History
- Opened: 1853; 173 years ago
- Closed: September 30, 1941; 85 years ago (passenger service) November 20, 1950; 75 years ago (agency)
- Rebuilt: 1909; 117 years ago
- Former names: Scottsville (1853–1903) Pixley (1903–1906) Oatka (1906–1909)

Former services
Preceding station	Erie Railroad	Following station
West Henrietta toward Rochester	Rochester Branch	Gannett toward Avon
Location

The Rochester Chapter was founded in 1937, and by the late 1960s was ready to start a museum due to the ongoing acquisition of artifacts and rolling stock. After a survey of several locations around Rochester, New York, the former Erie Depot, located in Industry, was selected. The depot was built in 1909 as "Oatka," later changed to "Industry" after the newly established state school for boys. The depot features two waiting rooms, separated by the agent's office. It was custom of the time to provide separate waiting areas for men and women. In later years, the separate waiting room was used to segregate inmates from the state school from the public.

The last passenger train stopped at Industry on September 30, 1941, and the depot was closed in 1950. Over the years, the Erie survived a few name changes and bankruptcies and merged with its long-time competitor to form the Erie Lackawanna Railway in 1960. The Rochester Chapter was seeking a home and possible museum site for its activities, and discovered Industry depot was available. The depot had been abandoned since 1957, and by December 1969, the Rochester Chapter had adopted it as their new home. The depot was purchased outright from EL in 1971 for the ceremonial sum of $1.00. After years of restoration by volunteers, the Depot has been restored to how it would have appeared in the 1930s.

Since acquiring the depot, the museum has been growing both facilities and expanding track capacity. The site had no available sidings, even though the Erie Lackawanna track was still in use for freight service. By 1979 volunteers had constructed enough track to receive the first piece of equipment, a Buffalo, Rochester and Pittsburgh Railway caboose #280. In 1981, the RGVRRM got its first locomotive, EK 6, recently retired from Eastman Kodak. Volunteers started to acquire additional railroad and construction equipment. This led to the eventual completion of a 1 mile (1.6 km) demonstration railroad, completed in 1993.

Track cars, or speeders, were first used to give visitors rides on the museum demonstration railroad. In addition to track cars, diesel-hauled trains are operated for special events. In 1998, the museum began their popular Diesel Days weekend celebration showcasing the collection of operating vintage diesels for the public. Regular operation of track cars ended in 2010, and all rides are now provided by diesel-hauled trains consisting of restored freight train cabooses. The museum continues to grow and expand, with additional storage space planned to house its unique collection of equipment. The museum is unique as it is one of the only operating railroad museums in New York State. The museum prides itself on maintaining most of its collection in operating condition, which further enhances the visitor experience.

== Collection ==
The collection of the Rochester & Genesee Valley Railroad Museum is quite extensive. The RGVRRM rosters 10 locomotives, 13 freight cars, 15 pieces of passenger equipment and various other pieces of rail equipment. Of note, distinctive high-hood "Hammerhead" Lehigh Valley Railroad RS3m 211 is part of the operating collection. The museum is also home to the sole remaining trolley car (Car # 60) from the Rochester Subway fleet, returned to Rochester Chapter in 1998 after being on loan and later in storage for many years. In 1998 a steel building was erected to assist in the preservation and restoration of equipment. 2007 saw the arrival of the seven Budd-built 1941-vintage Empire State Express coaches that are used for Fall Foliage trips, operated on the Ontario Midland Railroad between 1993-2004, and most recently on the Livonia, Avon and Lakeville Railroad.

Because Rochester is known as the "World's Image Center" and is associated with photography and the home of Eastman Kodak, the museum has an extensive collection of photos. Of note is the collection of steam-era images from Robert Carper, a Rochester native who authored "American Railroads in Transition." Many of the photos from that book are now in the museum's collection, and on display.

Other artifacts include an extensive collection of signaling equipment. Rochester was home to General Railway Signal, and as such the installation and operation of signals on the railroad is a long-term goal. Items include an operating semaphore, searchlights, an under restoration Saxby and Farmer armstrong machine and a Union Switch and Signal CTC Machine.

=== Locomotives ===
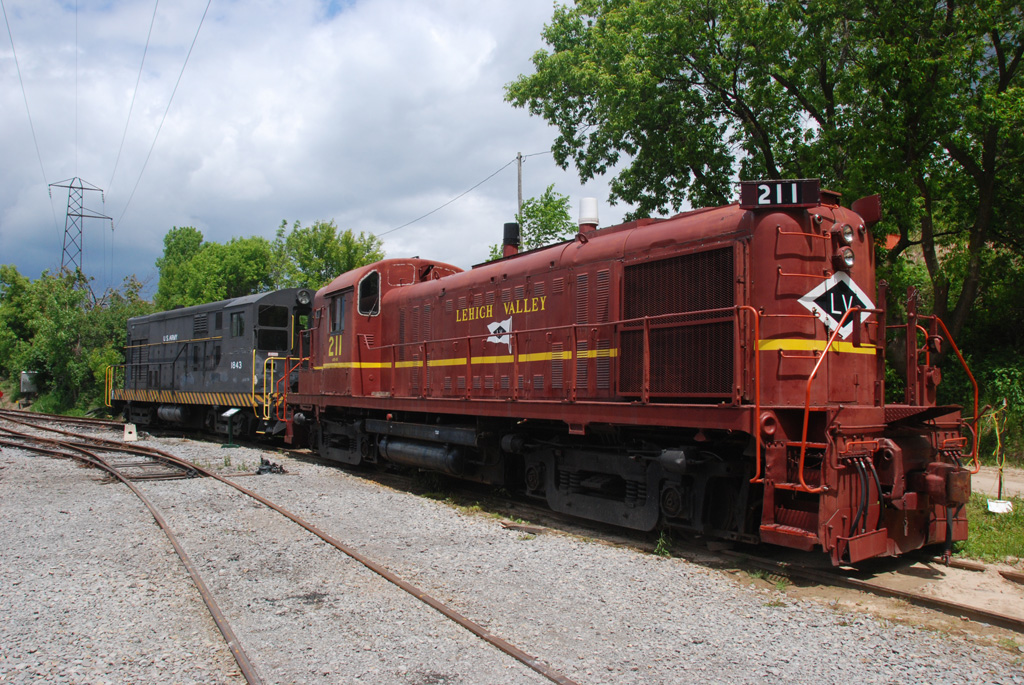
LV 211 and USA 1843 parked in Industry Yard.

Locomotive	Type	Source	Year acquired
EK 6	GE 80-ton switcher	Eastman Kodak	1981
LV 211	ALCO RS-3m	Conrail via Genesee Valley Transportation Company	1986
RG&E 1941	GE 45-ton switcher	Rochester Gas and Electric	1991
USA 1843	FM H-12-44	Seneca Army Depot	1993
EK 9	Alco RS-1	Eastman Kodak	1997
CL&P 2	Hiesler Fireless 0-4-0	Connecticut Light & Power	1997
R&GV 54	GE 80-ton switcher	US Army/DLA	2001
RG&E 8	GE 110-ton switcher	Rochester Gas and Electric	2008
RG&E 1950	GE 45-ton switcher	Rochester Gas and Electric	2008
LA&L 20	Alco RS-1	Livonia, Avon and Lakeville Railroad	2016
NKP 79	Alco S-4	Nickel Plate Road	2016
DS #5	Vulcan 0-4-0T	Mortimer & Red Creek Railroad Museum	2023
LA&L 72	Alco S-4	Livonia, Avon and Lakeville Railroad	2023
B&H 5	ALCo S-1	New York Central Railroad	2025

=== Passenger equipment ===
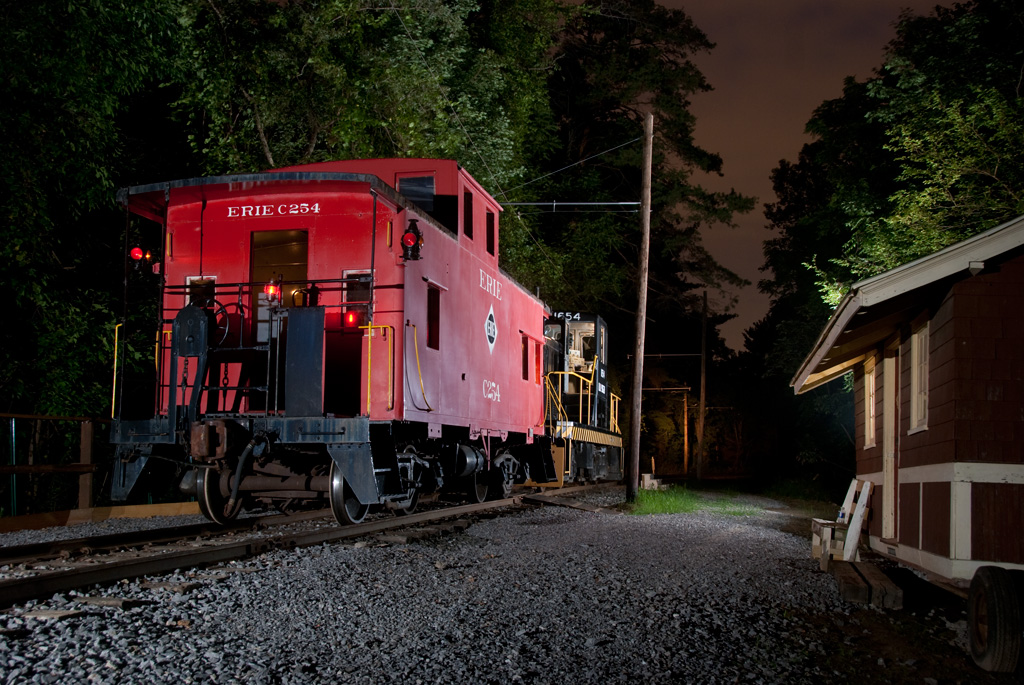
Erie C254 and 1654 pose at night next to the Rochester, Lockport & Buffalo Waiting room.

The museum owns a variety of passenger equipment. In 1988, the chapter as well as several members acquired five ex-New York Central Budd built 1941 stainless steel coaches from Metro-North Railroad; followed in 1990 by an additional coach, and in 1992 a baggage-rpo. Over the years, these cars were used for scenic excursions. As of 2008, they are being refurbished with new window glazing and improved heating systems. Another noteworthy car is the "Pine Falls," a 1939 Pullman built sleeper-lounge for the Pennsylvania Railroad. The museum also has in its collection the last car from the last train of ex-Lackawanna DC-electric MU's to depart from Hoboken Terminal in 1984. Two baggage cars are also part of the collection. An ex-Baltimore & Ohio baggage car serves as a tool car and workshop, while an ex-Lackawanna baggage car has been refurbished to house displays. An ex-Pennsylvania Railroad class B60 Railway Post Office is currently being refurbished to house additional displays.

=== Freight equipment ===
There are a total of 13 pieces of freight equipment in the collection. Most often used are two cabooses. Erie C254 was restored in the mid-1990s and sees regular service. It was constructed by the Erie Railroad at their Dunmore, PA, Shops in 1946. Penn Central 18562 was built in East Rochester, New York, in 1969 at the Despatch Shops. It was donated in 1996 by Conrail to the museum where it was restored to its original Penn Central appearance. MDT 14053 is an ice-cooled refrigerated boxcar built by Pacific Car and Foundry, and houses displays related to the Despatch Shops in East Rochester, where thousands of cars like it were built until 1970. Former Lehigh Valley Railroad "Northeastern" style caboose 95100 was acquired in 2011 from a local scrap yard to be restored to operating condition. In 2014, a former U.S. Army 40-foot flatcar was acquired from the Lowville and Beaver River Railroad, to be converted into an open-air rider flat. The conversion was completed and the car entered service in August 2017.
