= Avon, New York =

- Town
- Nickname: Corn Village
- Location within New York Location within the United States
- Coordinates: 42°54′43″N 77°44′46″W
- Country: United States
- State: New York
- County: Livingston
- Settled: 1789; 237 years ago
- Established: 1797; 229 years ago
- Renamed: 1808; 218 years ago

Government
  - Type: Town Council
  - Town Supervisor: David LeFeber (R)
  - Town Council: Members' List: • Jim Harrington (R); • Paul Drozdziel (R); • Thomas Mairs (R); • Malachy Coyne (D)

Area
  - Total: 41.26 sq mi (106.86 km^{2})
  - Land: 41.20 sq mi (106.72 km^{2})
  - Water: 0.054 sq mi (0.14 km^{2})

Population (2010)
  - Total: 7,164
  - Estimate (2016): 6,964
  - Density: 169.0/sq mi (65.26/km^{2})
- Time zone: UTC-5 (Eastern (EST))
  - Summer (DST): UTC-4 (EDT)
- Postal code: ZIP Codes
- Area codes: 14414 (Avon); 14472 (Honeoye Falls); 14454 (Geneseo)
- FIPS code: 36-051-03364
- Website: avon-ny.gov

Avon (/ˈævɑːn/ AV-ahn) is a town in Livingston County, New York, United States. It is south of Rochester. The town population was 6,939 at the 2020 census. The town was named after Avon, Connecticut, a town in Hartford County. The village of Avon is in the northwest part of the town.

== History ==
The area around and including what would become Avon village was inhabited for millennia by Paleo-Indians and later by the Seneca people, the westernmost tribe of the Haudenosaunee (Iroquois). After the Iroquois title to the land was extinguished in 1788 with the Phelps and Gorham Purchase, white and Black settlement of the area began. In 1789, Dr. Timothy Hosmer, Maj. Isaiah Thompson, William Wadsworth, and others from Hartford, Connecticut, purchased a tract east of the Genesee River and named it "Hartford" after their homeland. The town was organized in 1797. The town's name was changed to "Avon" in 1808 to avoid confusion with another Hartford in Washington County, New York. In 1818, part of the town was removed to form the new town of Rush. County lines shifted as well, Avon and Rush both being part of Ontario County until the formation of Livingston County and Monroe County in 1821.

The first permanent white settlers of Avon village were Gilbert and Maria (Wemple) Berry in 1789, who operated a tavern and a rope ferry on the east bank of the Genesee River. When Gilbert died in 1797, Maria Berry continued serving travelers in the inn until about 1812. The town's first gristmill was built by Capt. John Ganson in northwest Avon in 1789 and the first sawmill in 1797 on the Conesus Outlet built by Dr. Hosmer.

Mineral springs were an important resource of the early town. Beginning in the 1820s, people became interested in water as a therapy for all sorts of maladies, and mineral waters in particular for their reputed health benefits and even as cures. Avon, redolent in natural springs, soon became extremely popular with the afflicted. The wealthy, too, seeking relaxation and leisure, flocked to the town from far and wide. Numerous hotels and spas sprang up to take advantage of this fad, and bottling companies packaged the mineral water for sale. By the late 1890s to early 1900s, most of the hotels that had not closed due to the decline of the spa era had succumbed to fire or were soon razed. The Avon Inn is the only spa structure still standing in the town.

Points of historic interest in Avon include:

- The Avon Five Arch Bridge, a remnant of a railroad bridge over the Conesus Outlet at Littleville. It was added to the National Register of Historic Places in 2012.
- The Avon Inn, added to the National Register in 1991.
- The Avon Erie Railroad Station, now a restaurant
- The Barber–Mulligan Farm, added to the National Register in 1980.
- Charlton Farm, a residence designed by J. Foster Warner and now a bed and breakfast
- Erie-Lackawanna Railroad bridge over the Genesee River, which connects Avon to the Genesee Valley Greenway, a rail trail.
- First Presbyterian Church of Avon, constructed in 1812 and added to the National Register in 2005.
- Tom Wahl's, a fast food restaurant chain which has its origin in Avon as a tiny ice cream shop called the Twin Kiss.

== Geography ==
According to the United States Census Bureau, the town has a total area of 41.3 square miles (106.9 km^{2}), of which 41.2 square miles (106.7 km^{2}) are land and 0.05 square miles (0.14 km^{2}), or 0.13%, are water.

The north town line is the border of Monroe County. The Genesee River defines the west town line, flowing northward past Avon village. Conesus Creek, flowing from Conesus Lake, empties into the Genesee, west of Avon village.

U.S. Route 20 and New York State Route 5 are east-west highways across the town and intersect New York State Route 39 in Avon village. New York State Route 15 is another north-south highway in the eastern part of the town. Interstate 390 connects the town to areas north and south.

=== Adjacent towns and areas ===
(Clockwise)

- Rush
- Lima Honeoye Falls
- Livonia; Geneseo
- York; Caledonia

== Climate ==
According to the Köppen Climate Classification system, Avon has a warm-summer humid continental climate, abbreviated "Dfb" on climate maps. The hottest temperature recorded in Avon was 103 °F (39.4 °C) on July 5, 1911 and July 9, 1936, while the coldest temperature recorded was −30 °F (−34.4 °C) on February 9, 1934.

Climate data for Avon, New York, 1991–2020 normals, extremes 1895–present
Month	Jan	Feb	Mar	Apr	May	Jun	Jul	Aug	Sep	Oct	Nov	Dec	Year
Record high °F (°C)	68 (20)	72 (22)	84 (29)	91 (33)	95 (35)	100 (38)	103 (39)	99 (37)	98 (37)	90 (32)	79 (26)	71 (22)	103 (39)
Mean maximum °F (°C)	57.6 (14.2)	55.5 (13.1)	66.6 (19.2)	80.0 (26.7)	86.8 (30.4)	90.5 (32.5)	91.2 (32.9)	89.6 (32.0)	87.7 (30.9)	80.0 (26.7)	68.9 (20.5)	57.8 (14.3)	92.7 (33.7)
Mean daily maximum °F (°C)	32.4 (0.2)	34.2 (1.2)	42.5 (5.8)	55.8 (13.2)	69.0 (20.6)	77.4 (25.2)	81.5 (27.5)	79.9 (26.6)	73.4 (23.0)	60.9 (16.1)	48.4 (9.1)	37.6 (3.1)	57.7 (14.3)
Daily mean °F (°C)	24.4 (−4.2)	25.5 (−3.6)	33.1 (0.6)	45.0 (7.2)	57.3 (14.1)	66.5 (19.2)	70.7 (21.5)	68.9 (20.5)	62.0 (16.7)	50.7 (10.4)	40.0 (4.4)	30.5 (−0.8)	47.9 (8.8)
Mean daily minimum °F (°C)	16.4 (−8.7)	16.7 (−8.5)	23.7 (−4.6)	34.1 (1.2)	45.6 (7.6)	55.6 (13.1)	59.9 (15.5)	57.9 (14.4)	50.7 (10.4)	40.6 (4.8)	31.5 (−0.3)	23.3 (−4.8)	38.0 (3.3)
Mean minimum °F (°C)	−3.4 (−19.7)	−1.1 (−18.4)	5.5 (−14.7)	22.5 (−5.3)	32.2 (0.1)	42.3 (5.7)	49.5 (9.7)	47.2 (8.4)	37.6 (3.1)	27.7 (−2.4)	17.0 (−8.3)	6.2 (−14.3)	−6.8 (−21.6)
Record low °F (°C)	−25 (−32)	−30 (−34)	−12 (−24)	4 (−16)	10 (−12)	33 (1)	37 (3)	36 (2)	25 (−4)	14 (−10)	−2 (−19)	−20 (−29)	−30 (−34)
Average precipitation inches (mm)	2.00 (51)	1.65 (42)	2.48 (63)	2.81 (71)	3.01 (76)	3.47 (88)	3.68 (93)	3.43 (87)	3.15 (80)	3.23 (82)	2.45 (62)	2.23 (57)	33.59 (852)
Average snowfall inches (cm)	13.4 (34)	12.3 (31)	10.7 (27)	1.3 (3.3)	0.0 (0.0)	0.0 (0.0)	0.0 (0.0)	0.0 (0.0)	0.0 (0.0)	0.0 (0.0)	4.7 (12)	9.3 (24)	51.7 (131.3)
Average extreme snow depth inches (cm)	7.1 (18)	7.0 (18)	7.4 (19)	1.0 (2.5)	0.0 (0.0)	0.0 (0.0)	0.0 (0.0)	0.0 (0.0)	0.0 (0.0)	0.0 (0.0)	3.4 (8.6)	4.5 (11)	11.2 (28)
Average precipitation days (≥ 0.01 in)	14.5	12.1	12.6	12.8	12.0	11.9	11.5	10.6	11.0	13.5	12.6	14.1	149.2
Average snowy days (≥ 0.1 in)	8.9	7.6	5.0	1.1	0.0	0.0	0.0	0.0	0.0	0.1	2.3	6.3	31.3
Source 1: NOAA
Source 2: National Weather Service

== Demographics ==
Historical population
Census	Pop.	Note	%±
1820	1,933		—
1830	2,362		22.2%
1840	2,999		27.0%
1850	2,809		−6.3%
1860	2,910		3.6%
1870	3,038		4.4%
1880	3,459		13.9%
1890	3,179		−8.1%
1900	3,071		−3.4%
1910	3,432		11.8%
1920	3,350		−2.4%
1930	3,566		6.4%
1940	3,509		−1.6%
1950	3,725		6.2%
1960	4,404		18.2%
1970	6,117		38.9%
1980	6,185		1.1%
1990	6,283		1.6%
2000	6,443		2.5%
2010	7,164		11.2%
2020	6,939		−3.1%
U.S. Decennial Census

As of the census of 2000, there were 6,443 people, 2,525 households, and 1,732 families residing in the town. The population density was 156.5 inhabitants per square mile (60.4/km^{2}). There were 2,671 housing units at an average density of 64.9 per square mile (25.1/km^{2}). The racial makeup of the town was 95.87% White, 1.54% Black or African American, 0.34% Native American, 0.71% Asian, 0.02% Pacific Islander, 0.23% from other races, and 1.29% from two or more races. Hispanic or Latino of any race were 1.38% of the population.

There were 2,525 households, out of which 33.0% had children under the age of 18 living with them, 55.1% were married couples living together, 9.8% had a female householder with no husband present, and 31.4% were non-families. 25.9% of all households were made up of individuals, and 10.3% had someone living alone who was 65 years of age or older. The average household size was 2.52 and the average family size was 3.05.

In the town, the population was spread out, with 26.2% under the age of 18, 6.1% from 18 to 24, 30.1% from 25 to 44, 24.3% from 45 to 64, and 13.3% who were 65 years of age or older. The median age was 38 years. For every 100 females, there were 93.9 males. For every 100 females age 18 and over, there were 89.7 males.

The median income for a household in the town was $43,971, and the median income for a family was $54,315. Males had a median income of $40,654 versus $25,559 for females. The per capita income for the town was $22,379. About 6.2% of families and 6.7% of the population were below the poverty line, including 8.3% of those under age 18 and 5.4% of those age 65 or over.

== Communities and locations in the town ==
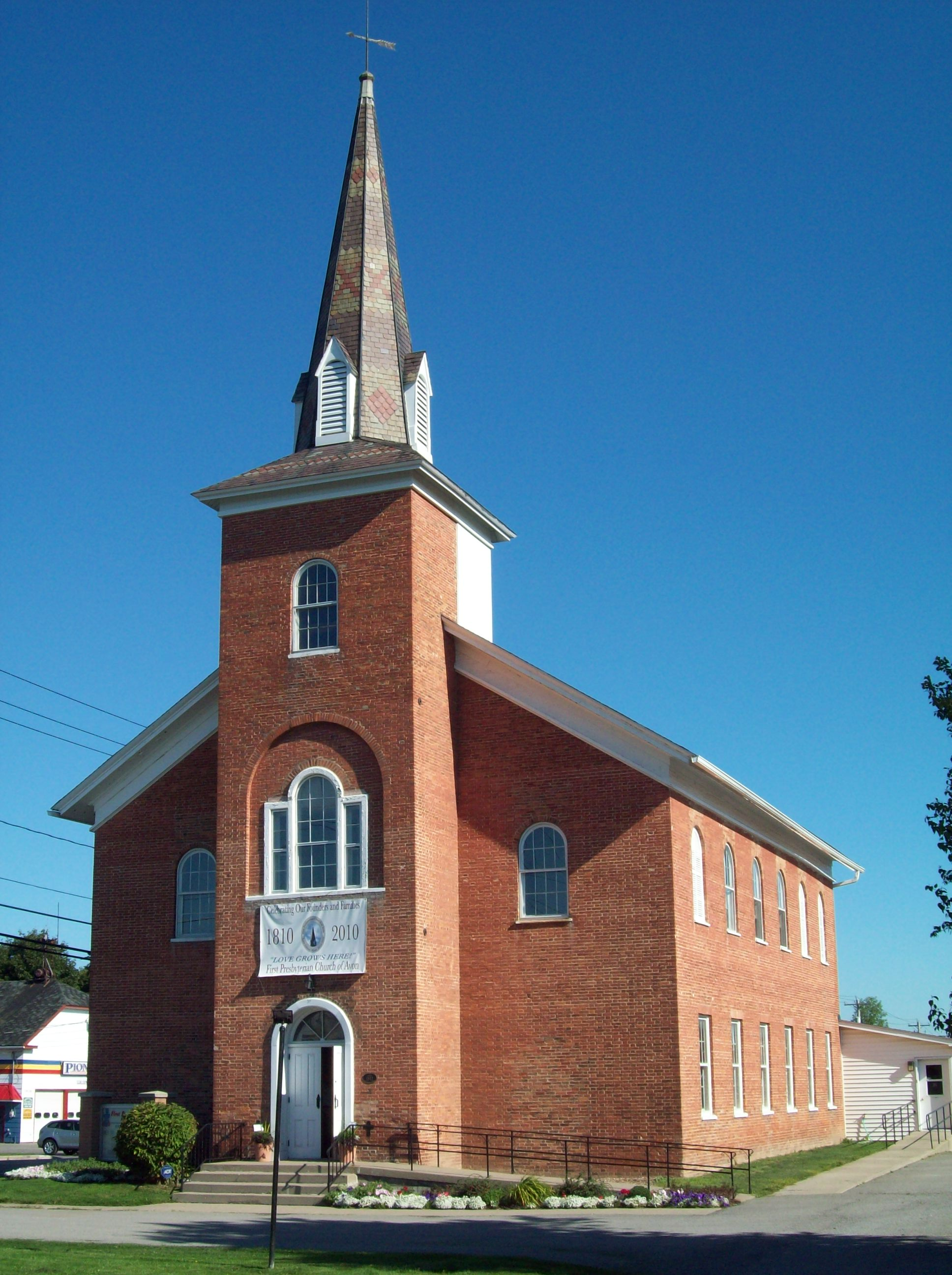
Historic First Presbyterian Church of Avon

- Ashantee – A hamlet immediately south of Avon village on NY-39.
- Avon – A village in the northwest part of the town.
- East Avon – A hamlet (and census-designated place) in the eastern part of the town at the intersections of NY-5, NY-15, and US-20. The First Presbyterian Church of Avon was added to the National Register of Historic Places in 2005.
- Littleville – A hamlet south of Avon village and adjacent to Ashantee.
- North Avon – A hamlet in the northeast corner of the town.
- South Avon – A hamlet south of Avon village on NY-39.
- South Lima – Part of the South Lima census-designated place is in the southeast corner of the town.
- Sugarberry – An historic hamlet in southwestern corner of the town.

== People ==
- John Hubbard Forsyth (1797–1836), defender of the Alamo
- Jocko Halligan (1868–1945), Major League Baseball player
- William Howe Cuyler Hosmer (1814–1877), noted poet; born in Avon
- Jimmie Keenan (1899–1980), Major League Baseball player
- Wilbur Murdoch (1875–1941), Major League Baseball player
- Julia Ann Wilbur (1815–1895), abolitionist and suffragist
- Ken O'Dea (1913–1985), Major League Baseball player
- Leather Leone, Heavy metal musician
