= GE 80-ton switcher =

Locomotive class

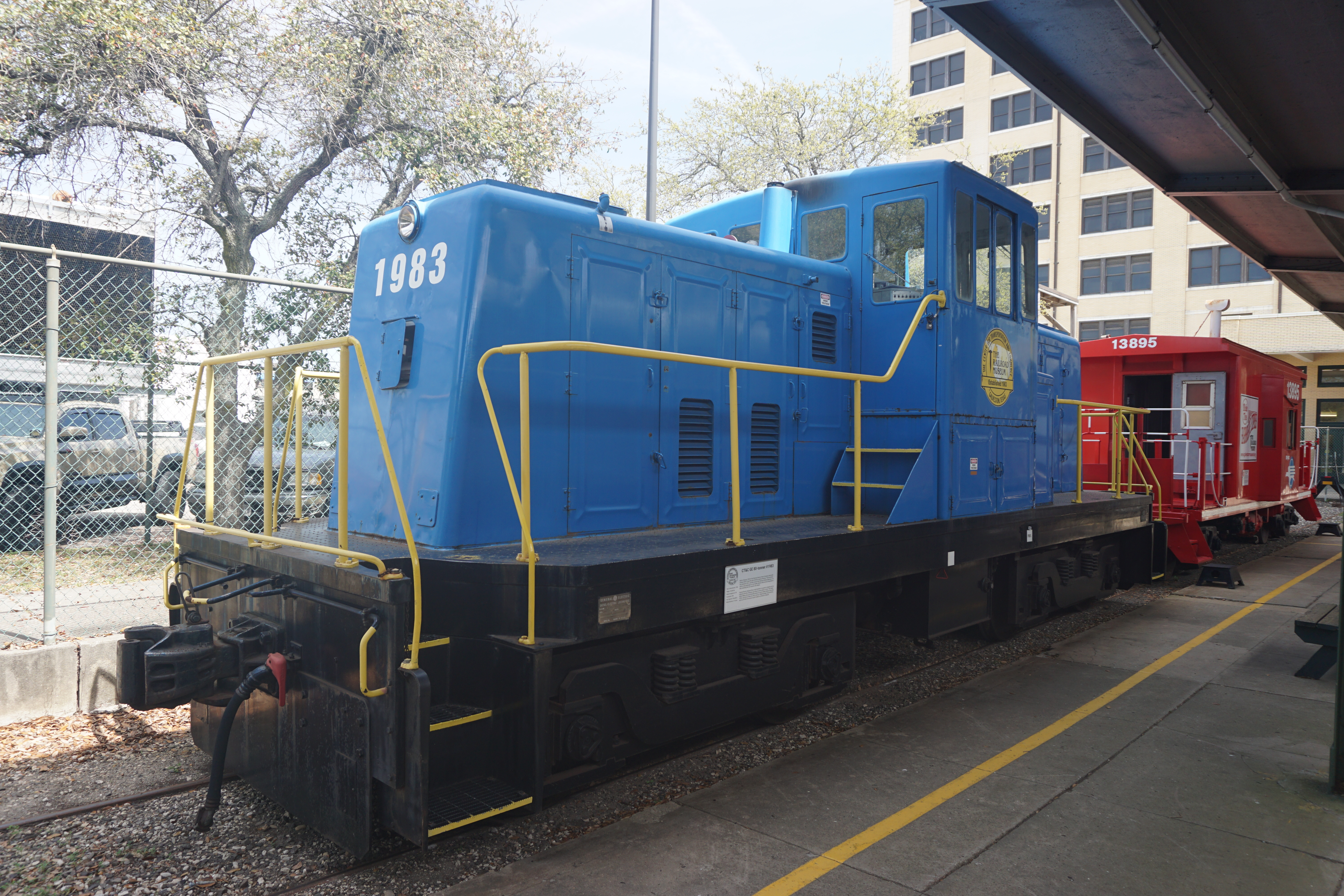
- Galveston Railroad Museum 80 Ton Locomotive
Type and origin
- Power type: Diesel-electric
- Builder: GE Transportation Systems
- Model: 80-ton switcher
- Build date: 1936–1973
Specifications
- Configuration
  - AAR: B-B
- Gauge: 4 ft 8 1/2 in (1,435 mm) standard gauge
- Loco weight: 80 short tons (71 long tons; 73 t)
- Prime mover: Cummins
- Traction motors: Four
- Transmission: diesel electric
Performance figures
- Power output: 2x470 hp (350 kW)

The GE 80-ton switcher is a diesel-electric locomotive model built by GE Transportation Systems. It is classified as a B-B type locomotive. It was designed for industrial and light switching duties around railheads and ports.

== Military version ==
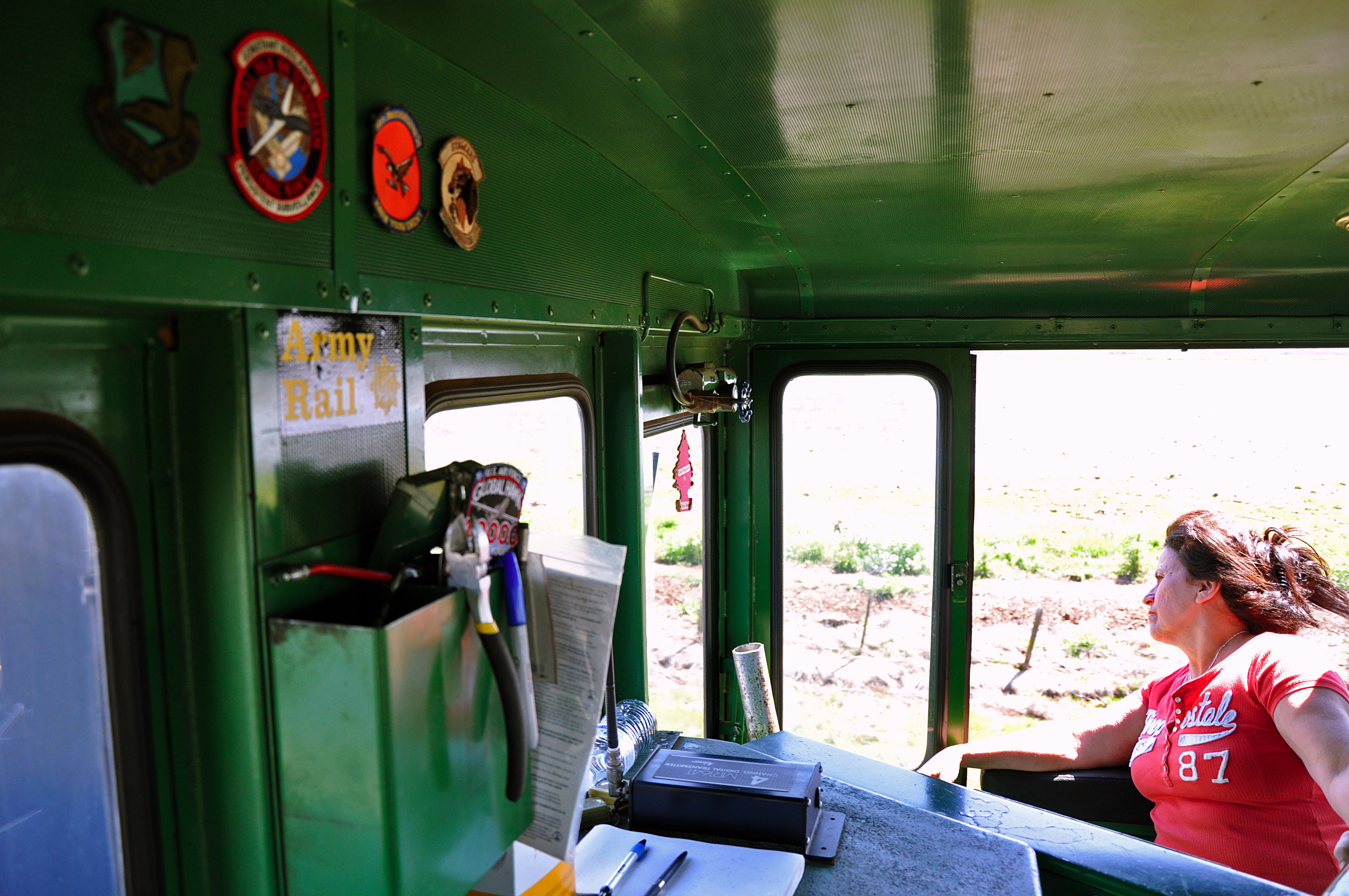
Susan Mertes, 9th Support Division locomotive engineer, looks from USAF 1668 to ensure the rails are clear at Beale Air Force Base, Calif., March 21, 2012. (U.S. Air Force photo by Airman 1st Class Andrew Buchanan/Released)

From 1940 to 1945, and again from 1951 to 1953, the United States Armed Forces purchased many 80-tonners for use switching railheads around Continental U.S. (CONUS) military facilities, including army and navy ammunition depots, forts, air force bases, etc.

In the 1990s Rail Equipment Division at Tooele Army Depot rebuilt most 80-tonners to have Cummins turbo-charged 470 hp (350 kW) 6-cylinder engines. The rebuild included a small cosmetic change resulting in end radiator screens and dual headlights. This rebuild gave all Army and some Air Force 80-tonners a much longer lifespan. Less than 27 Army and 5 Air Force 80-tonners are still in service present day. Navy 80-tonners did not undergo this rebuild. Many Navy engines were rebuilt by contracts with locomotive rehab companies.

== Civilian versions ==
From 1936 to 1973, hundreds of 80-tonners were produced for civilian use. Aside from the military versions, hundreds were produced for use by various industrial railroads across the US, with several dozen more being built for use in Canada.

Additionally, several units have been exported overseas: two to Belgium's Usine Gustave Boël, three to the Port of Rio de Janeiro in Brazil, four to industrial railroads in Chile, one to Cuba, four to Falconbridge Nickel's facility in the Dominican Republic, several dozen to steel industries in India, six to Italy (three for Fiat, and three for Italsider), 18 for industrial railroads in Mexico, and 10 for industrial railroads in Venezuela.

== Heritage Railways ==
At least ten 80-tonners have been known to be in tourist service. These locomotives resided on the Virginia & Truckee Railroad. The D-1 was acquired in 2003 and was the mainstay of the fleet while the railroad's two steam locomotives were undergoing rebuild. The Valley Railroad in Essex, Connecticut owns six 80-tonners, 0900, 0901, 0902, 0903, 0904, and 0905, for use on the Essex Clipper Dinner Train, as well as for yard switching and work train service. Former US Army 1654 is in regular service at the Rochester and Genesee Valley Railroad Museum as their No. 54, along with Eastman Kodak No. 6. An 80-ton G.E. switcher #7285, built in 1943, is still in operation at the Pacific Southwest Railway Museum in Campo, California in San Diego County on the San Diego & Arizona Railway.

The Nevada State Railroad Museum Boulder City located in Boulder City, Nevada, has one of the GE 80 tonners that was used at the Nevada Atomic Test site north of Las Vegas in the 1950s on the Jackass and Western Railroad for the nuclear engine development and testing program. US Navy 65-00310 is privately owned and is used on a recreational railroad at the Denton FarmPark in Denton, North Carolina. Former Center for Transportation and Commerce #1983, built in 1958, is in regular use for weekend trips at the Galveston Railroad Museum. Steam Into History operates an 80 Tonner, Northern Central Railway 32(ex US Army B-1685) regularly on their passenger trains.

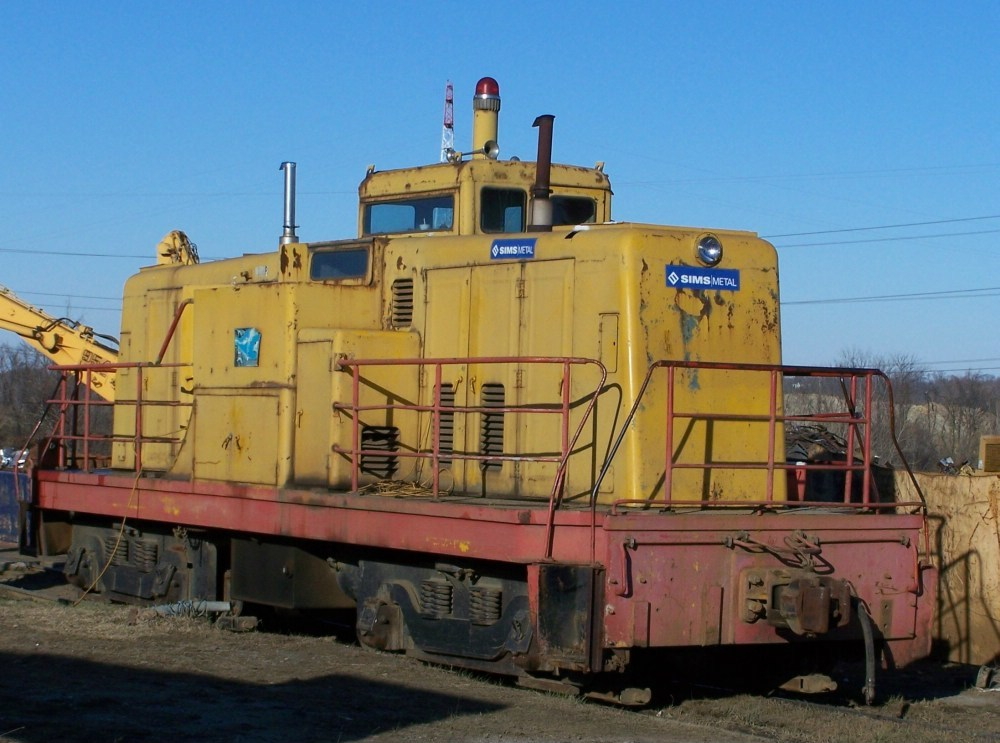
Original 80-Ton with "chopped cab".

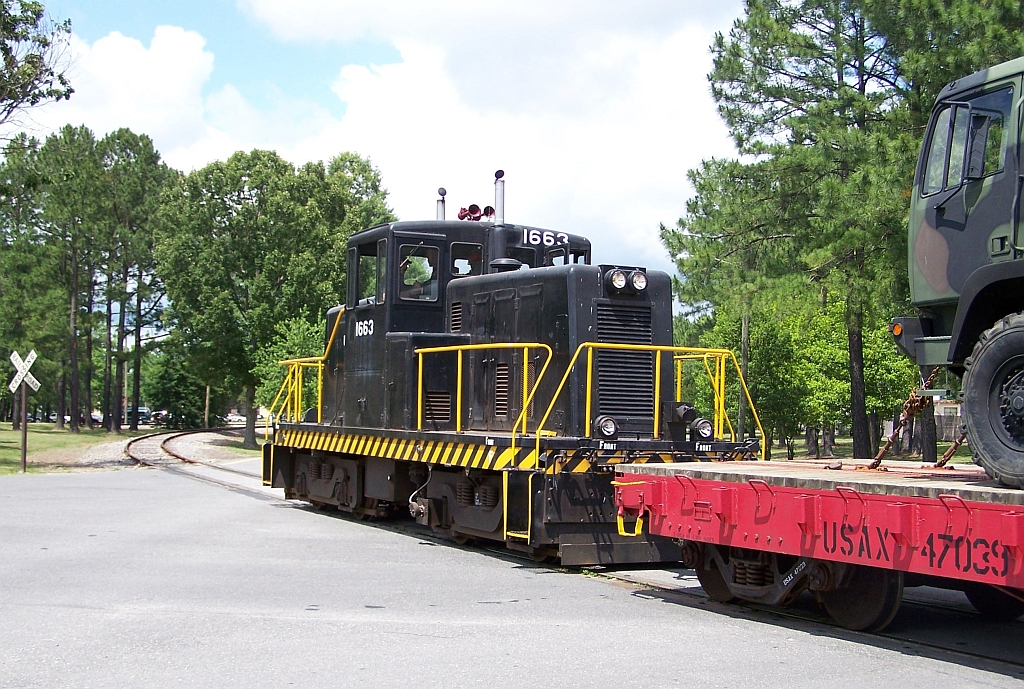
GE 80-Ton moving cars at the Fort Eustis Railhead.
