= Hall's Opera Block =

Historic commercial building in New York, United States

- U.S. National Register of Historic Places
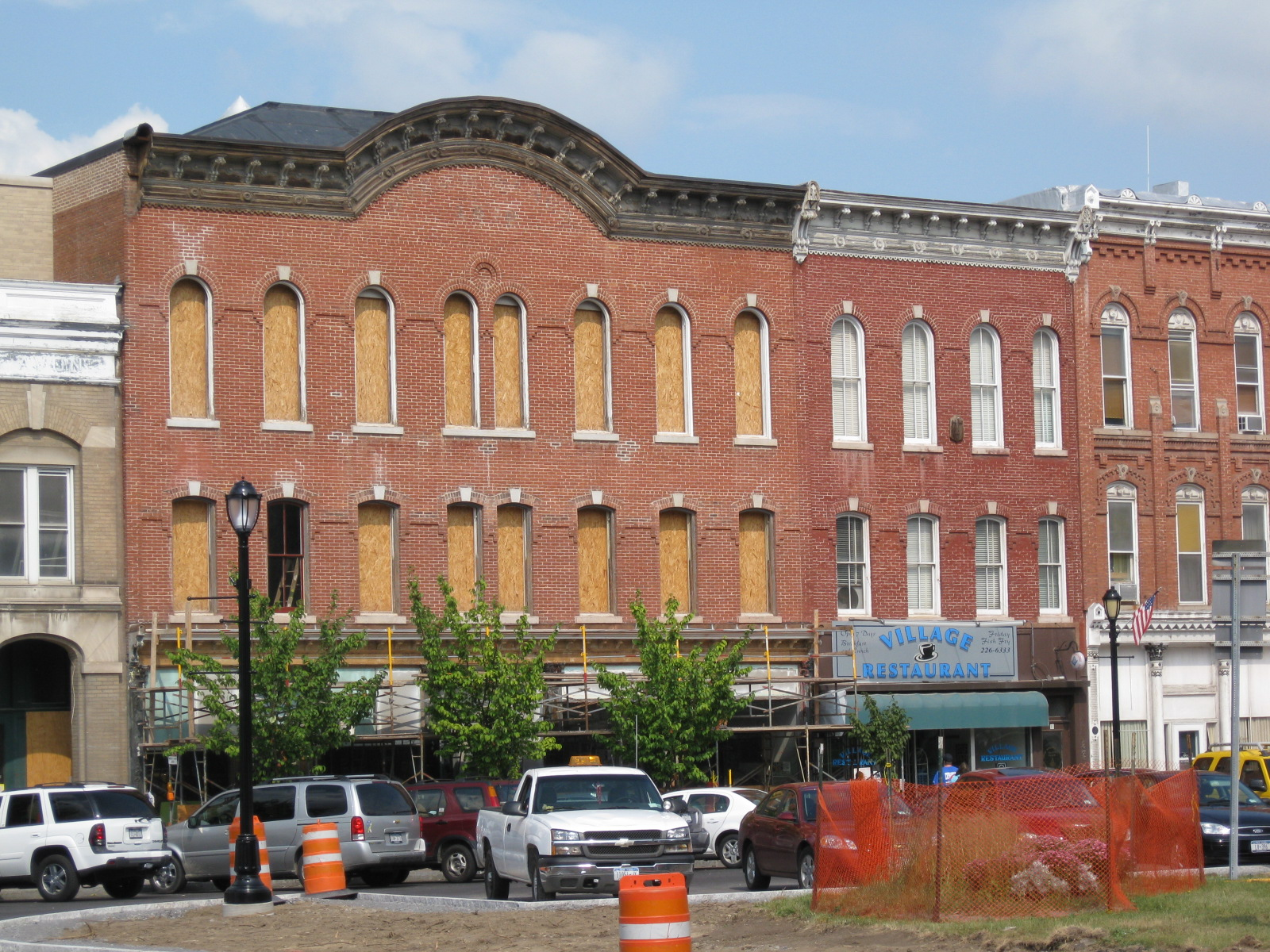
- Hall's Opera Block, August 2009

- Location within New York Location within the United States
- Location: 15-19 Genesee St., Avon, New York
- Coordinates: 42°54′42″N 77°44′48″W
- Area: 0.1 acres (0.040 ha)
- Built: 1876
- Architect: Long and Watkins
- Architectural style: Italianate
- NRHP reference No.: 06000884
- Added to NRHP: September 29, 2006

Hall's Opera Block, also known as Clark's Opera House and Avon Opera Block, is a historic commercial building located at Avon in Livingston County, New York. It is a three-story, two part commercial block completed in 1876 in the Italianate style. It has a symmetrical seven bay principal facade with iron and glass storefronts on the first floor. The top floor performance space was a central gathering place for the community, where citizens of all ranks could congregate to attend theatrical performances, lectures, dances, political meetings, and school graduations. In November 2007, the village of Avon received a $500,000 state grant to renovate the historic building.

It was listed on the National Register of Historic Places in 2006.
