= Avon Five Arch Bridge =

- U.S. National Register of Historic Places
- New York State Register of Historic Places
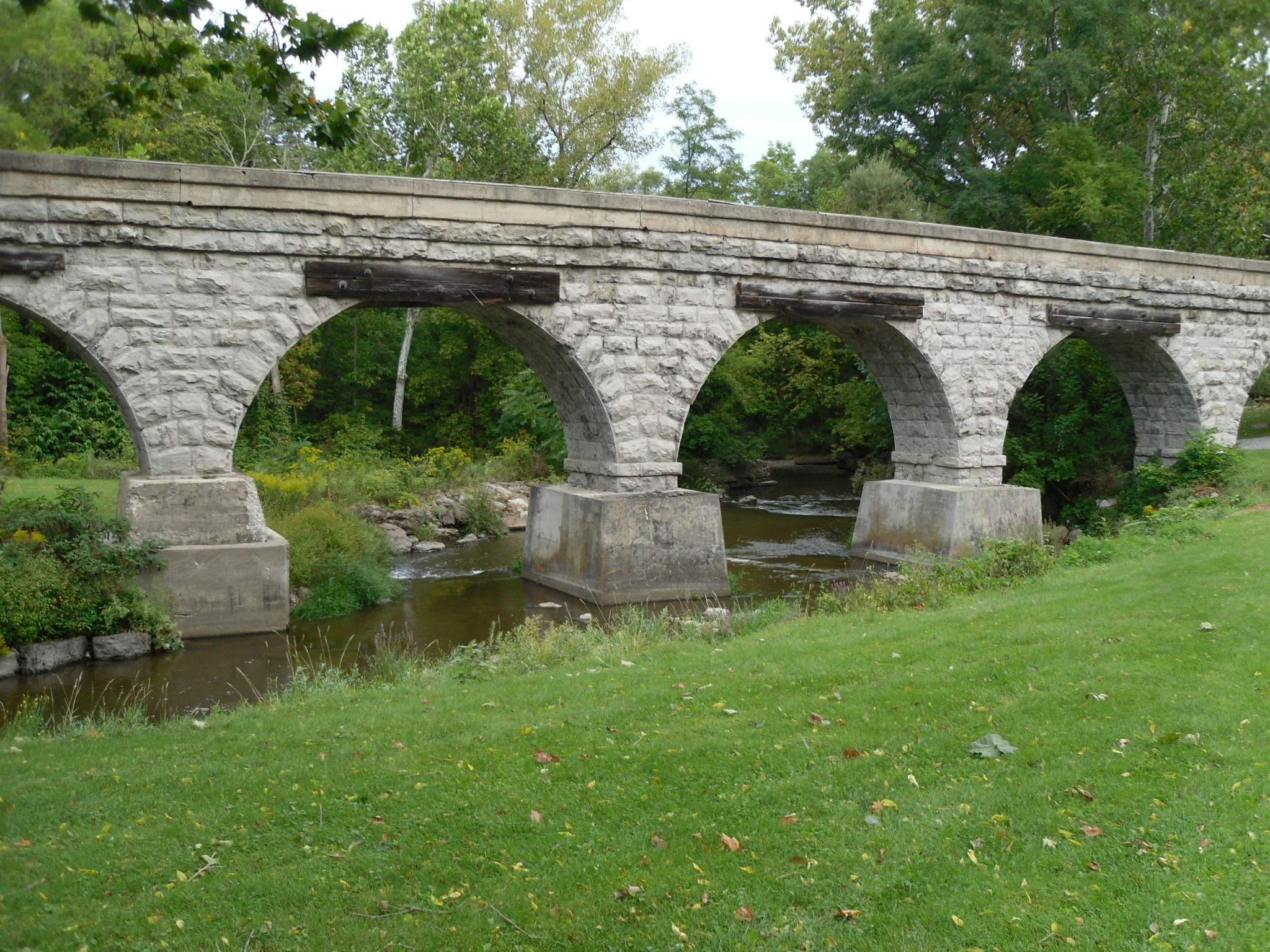
- Avon Five Arch Bridge, September 2010

- Location within New York Location within the United States
- Location: 2078 Avon Geneseo Road, Avon, New York
- Coordinates: 42°53′55″N 77°45′50″W
- Area: Less than 1 acre (0.40 ha)
- Built: 1856-1857
- Built by: Phelps, Mattoon, and Barnes
- Architectural style: Stone arch bridge
- NRHP reference No.: 11001001
- NYSRHP No.: 05101.000001

Significant dates
- Added to NRHP: January 4, 2012
- Designated NYSRHP: October 31, 2011

Avon Five Arch Bridge is a historic railroad arch bridge located at Avon in Livingston County, New York. It was built in 1856–1857 by the Rochester-Avon-Geneseo-Mount Morris Railroad (later Erie Railroad). The bridge measures 200 feet long, 12 feet wide, and approximately 30 feet high. It consists of five elliptical arches built of ashlar on limestone piers. The rail line was abandoned in 1941, and the bridge stabilized in 1992. It is located in a public park.

The Five Arch Bridge is mentioned in the country song "Big Iron Horses" by Restless Heart (1992). Singer/drummer John Dittrich recounted memories he had as a child, watching trains in Avon, New York with his grandfather. While the song does take liberty with the age of the bridge and the singer's age, he did watch trains with his grandfather in and was a resident of Avon. John likely watched the steam locomotives and trains roll by on the railroad tracks near the bridge.

The bridge was listed on the National Register of Historic Places in 2012.
