= Aaron Barber Memorial Building =

- U.S. National Register of Historic Places
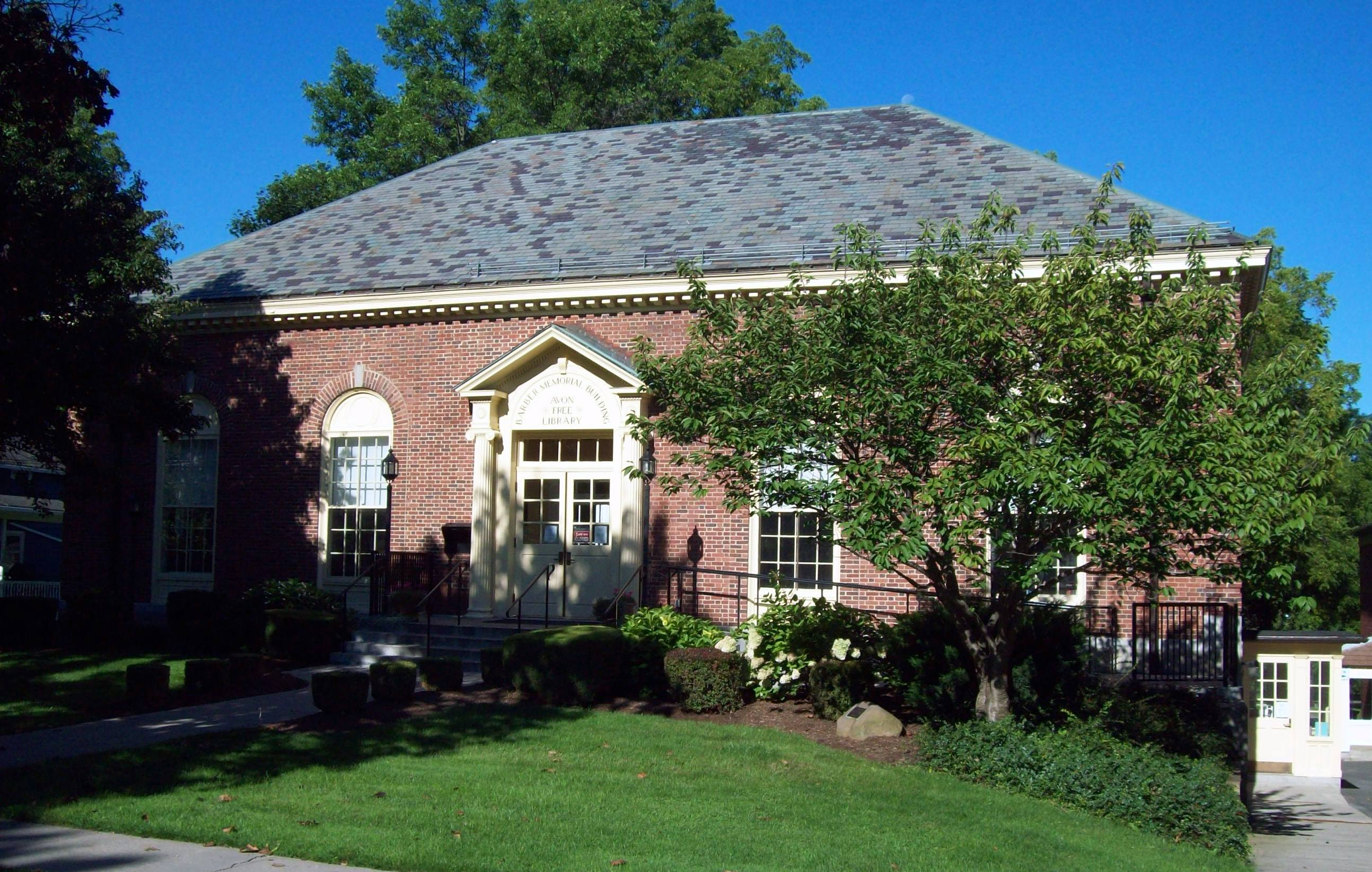
- Aaron Barber Memorial Building, August 2010

- Location within New York Location within the United States
- Location: 143 Genesee St., Avon, New York
- Coordinates: 42°54′35″N 77°44′52″W
- Area: 1.1 acres (0.45 ha)
- Built: 1928
- Architectural style: Colonial Revival
- NRHP reference No.: 07001452
- Added to NRHP: January 23, 2008

Aaron Barber Memorial Building, also known as Avon Free Library, is a historic library building located at the village of Avon in Livingston County, New York. It is a rectangular five- by three-bay brick one story brick building with a hipped roof. It was built in 1928 in the Colonial Revival style.

It was listed on the National Register of Historic Places in 2008.
