= Erie Railroad Depot (Rochester, New York) =

Former train station in Rochester, New York

Rochester
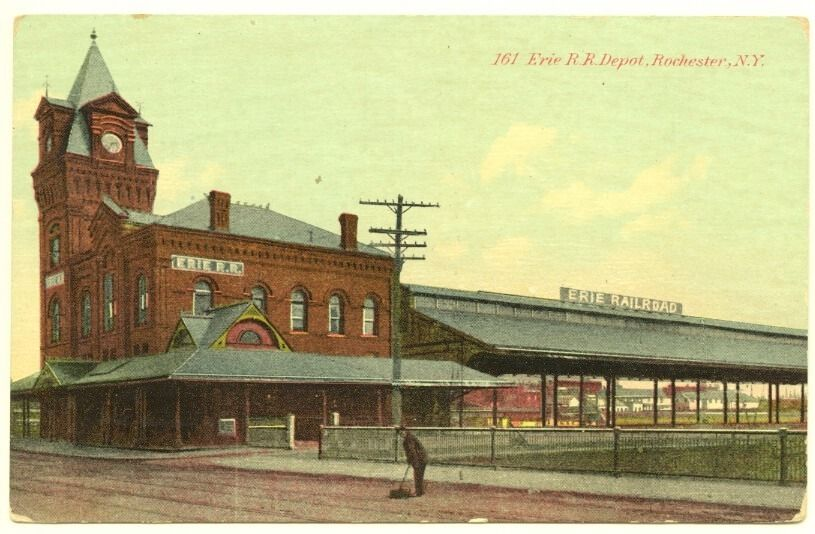
- Erie Railroad Depot, 1908

General information
- Location: between the Genesee River and Exchange Street on the south side of Court St., Rochester, New York; U.S.
- Coordinates: 43.1530°N 77.6102°W
- Line: Erie Railroad
- Platforms: 2 side platforms
- Tracks: 2

Other information
- Station code: 3985

History
- Opened: May 14, 1887
- Closed: September 30, 1941 (demolished in 1942)
- Electrified: 1907

Former services
Preceding station	Erie Railroad	Following station
Terminus	Rochester Branch	South Park toward Avon
Location

Erie Railroad Depot, Erie Railroad Station or Erie Depot was the terminal station for the Erie Railroad in Rochester, New York, designed by George E. Archer, the railroad's architect.

== History ==
The station opened in 1887 between the Genesee River and Exchange Street on the south side of Court Street. It was one of the Erie's few electrified railroad stations, and was one of the first stations to provide electric commuter services in 1907. The station was of Victorian design and included a clock tower. It had two tracks and a fully covered platform. The Erie Railroad tracks proceeded south along the east side of the river.

In 1905 the Lehigh Valley Railroad station opened directly across the Genesee River from the Erie Depot. Following the economically difficult years of the Great Depression, passenger service terminated in 1941. The station was demolished in 1942 although the tracks remained for a while after and continued to be used by the Erie Railroad through the 1950s. The area has become a parking lot for the Blue Cross Arena.

== Gallery ==
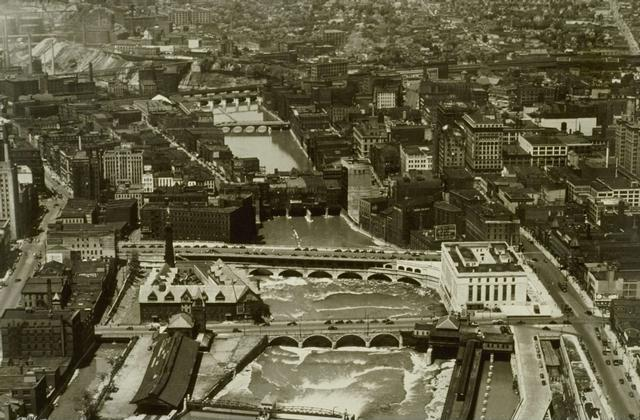
Downtown Rochester in the late 1930s; Erie Depot is on the lower left

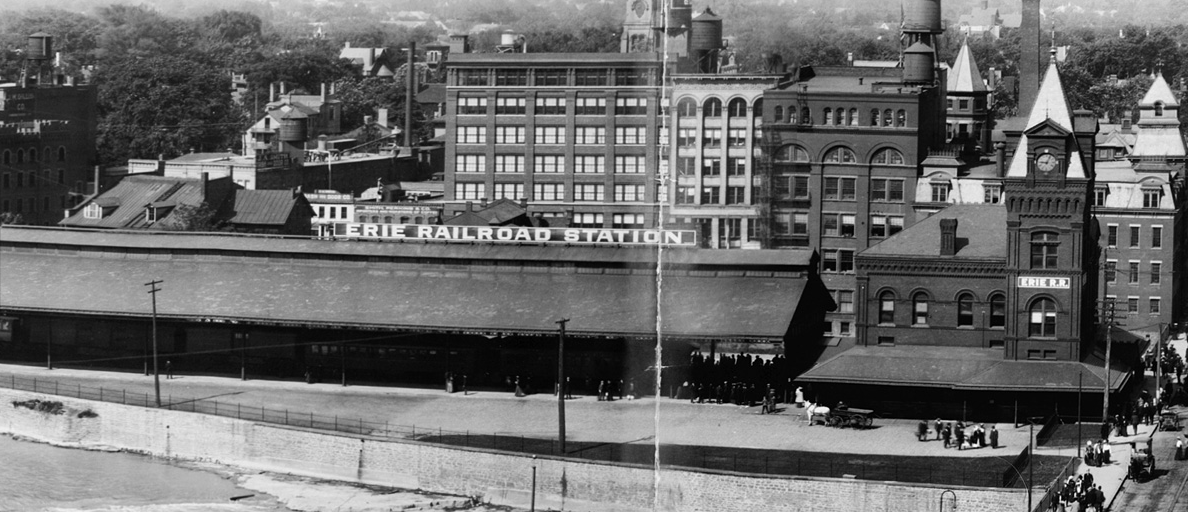
Station in 1906

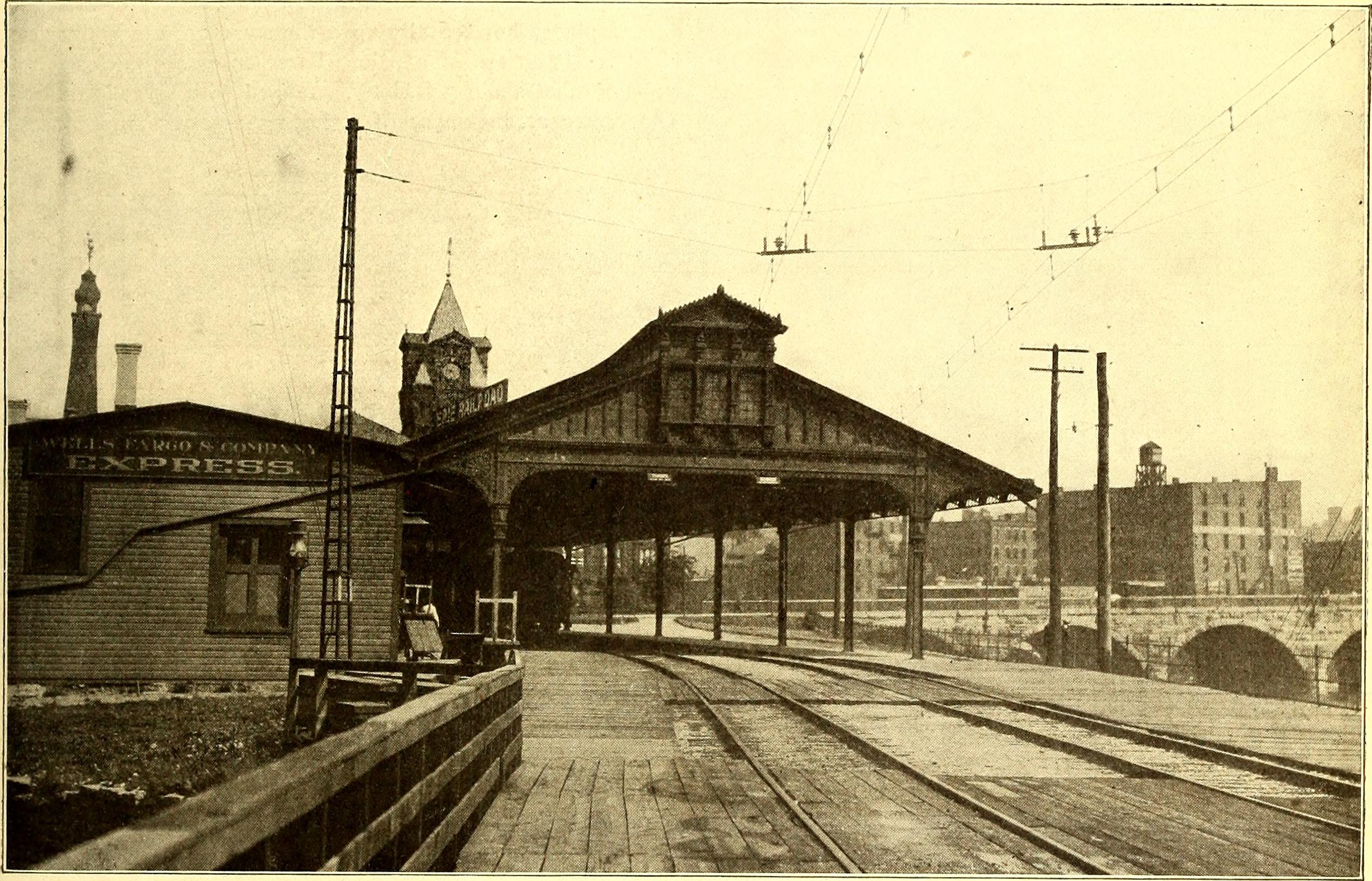
Station in 1907

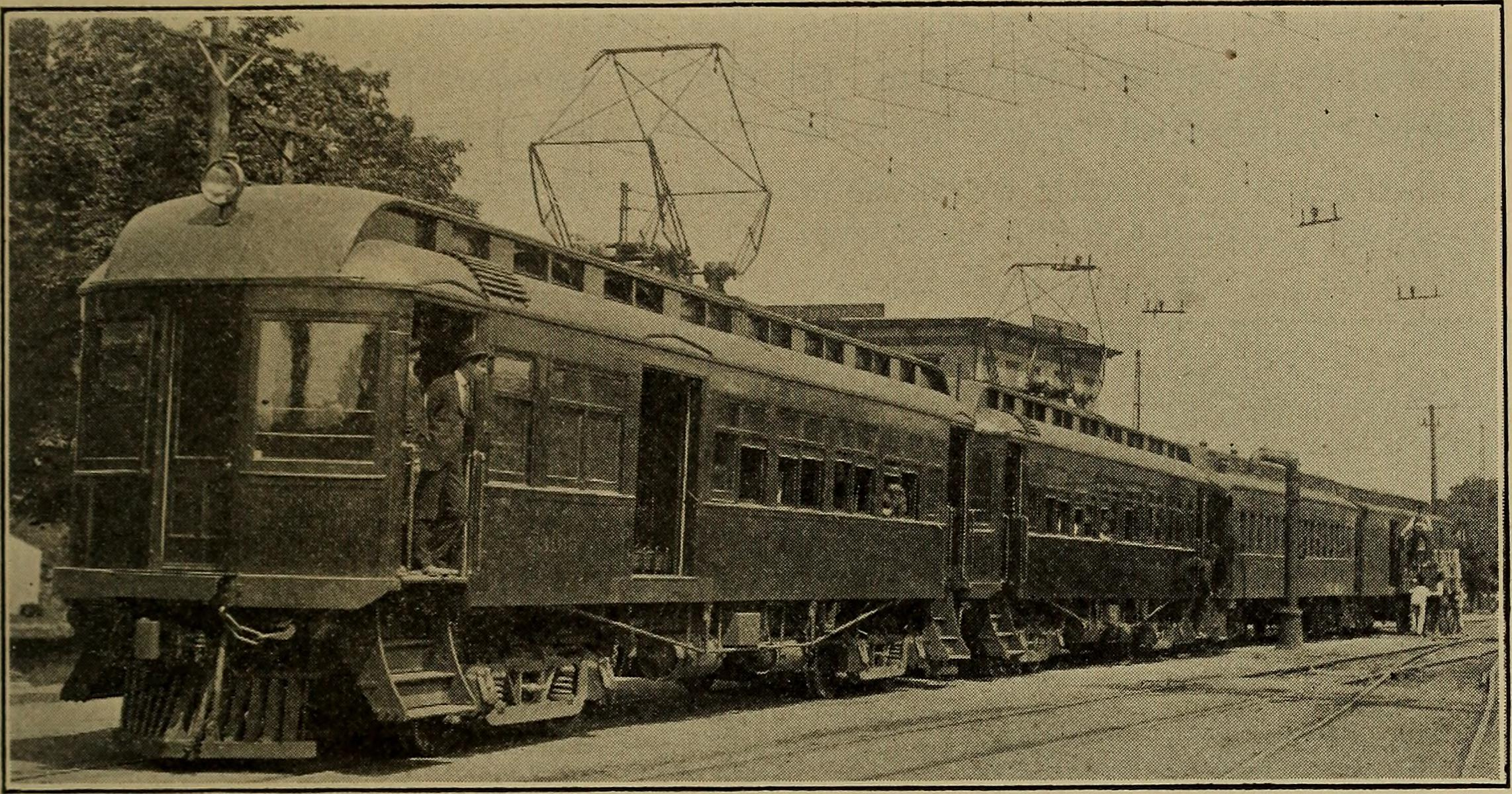
One the Erie Railroad's electric commuter trains at or near Rochester

== See also ==
- Rochester & Genesee Valley Railroad Museum
- Court Street Bridge (Genesee River)
