= First Methodist Episcopal Church of Avon =

Historic church in New York, United States

- U.S. National Register of Historic Places
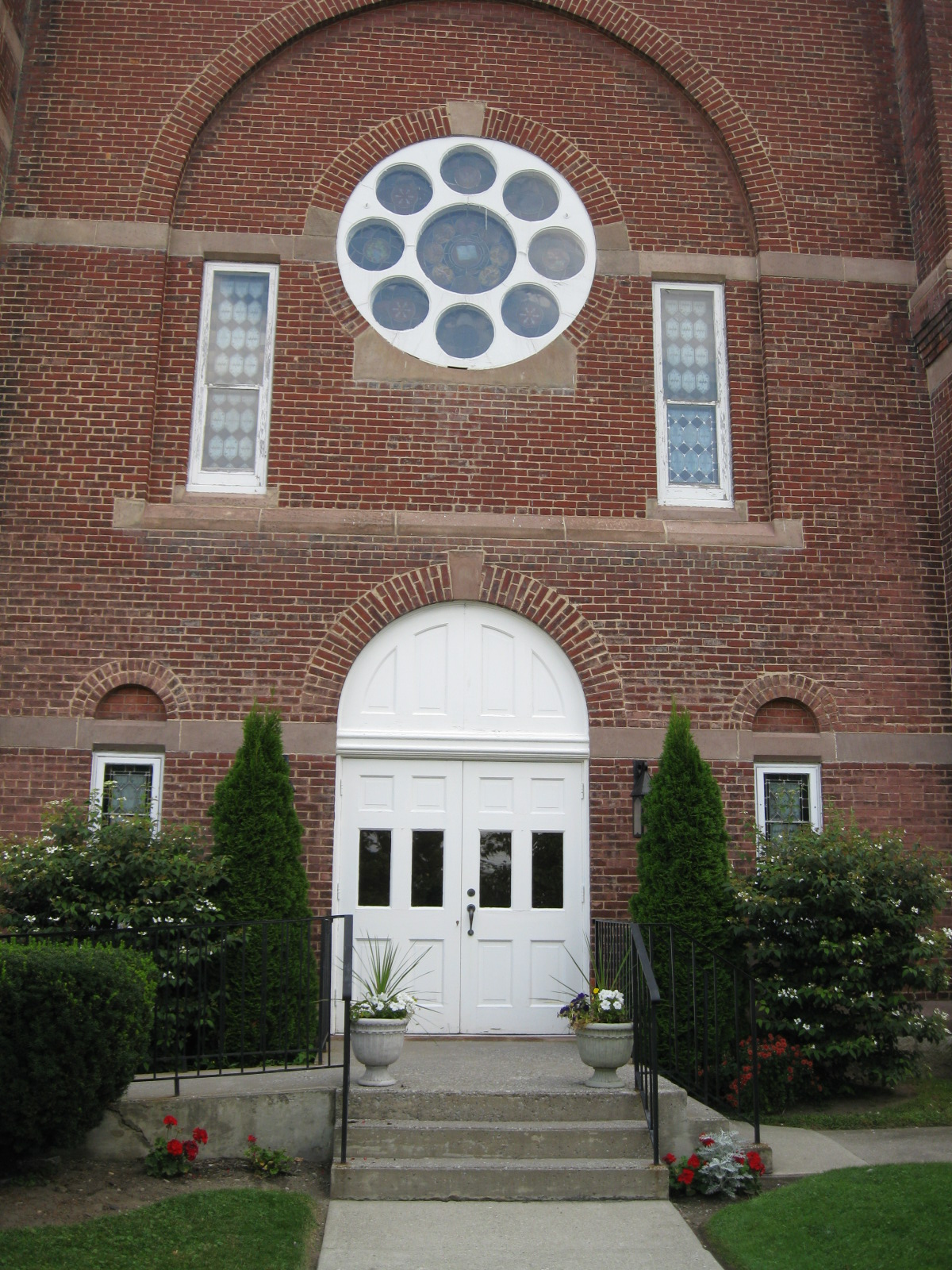
- First Methodist Episcopal Church of Avon, August 2009

- Location within New York Location within the United States
- Location: 130 Genesee St., Avon, New York
- Coordinates: 42°54′36″N 77°44′47″W
- Area: 0.8 acres (0.32 ha)
- Built: 1879
- Architect: Cutler, James G.
- Architectural style: Romanesque
- NRHP reference No.: 05000165
- Added to NRHP: March 15, 2005

First Methodist Episcopal Church of Avon, also known as Avon United Methodist Church, is a historic Methodist Episcopal church located at Avon in Livingston County, New York. It was designed by Rochester architect James Goold Cutler and built in 1879. It is a three- by five-bay Romanesque style brick building. The principal elevation is flanked by an engaged tower at the south end and low pavilion and chimney on the north. The center of the principal elevation is accented by a large recessed round arch at the upper level that contains a large center oculus window flanked by two small vertical windows.

It was listed on the National Register of Historic Places in 2005.
