= Avon (village), New York =

Avon, New York
- Village
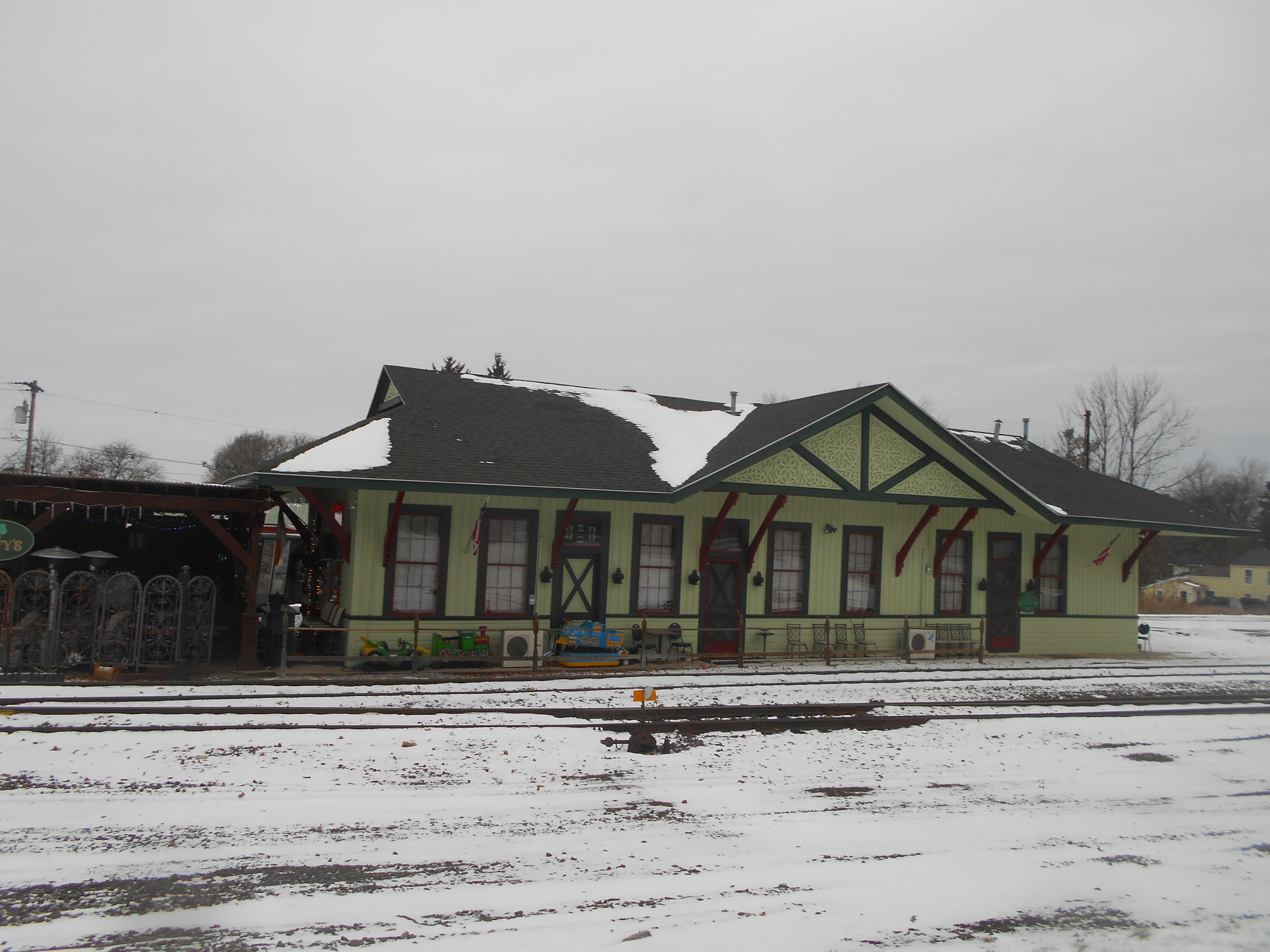
- The former Erie Railroad depot in Avon, now a restaurant

- Location within New York Location within the United States
- Coordinates: 42°54′37″N 77°44′52″W
- Country: United States
- State: New York
- County: Livingston
- Town: Avon

Government
  - Type: Village Hall
  - Mayor: Rob Hayes

Area
  - Total: 3.15 sq mi (8.15 km^{2})
  - Land: 3.15 sq mi (8.15 km^{2})
  - Water: 0 sq mi (0.00 km^{2})
- Elevation: 650 ft (198 m)

Population (2020)
  - Total: 3,399
  - Density: 1,080.3/sq mi (417.11/km^{2})
- Time zone: UTC-5 (Eastern (EST))
  - Summer (DST): UTC-4 (EDT)
- ZIP code: 14414
- Area code: 585
- FIPS code: 36-03353
- GNIS feature ID: 0942736
- Website: www.villageofavonny.gov

Avon is a village in the town of Avon, Livingston County, New York, United States. The village population was 3,394 at the 2010 census, out of 7,146 people in the entire town. The village and town are named after the River Avon in England.

== History ==
Avon was founded by European Americans along the Genesee River, across from the historic Seneca village known as Conawagus (in a transliterated spelling; also spelled as Ca-noh-wa-gas, Conewaugus, or Canawaugus, and as Ga:non'wagês in the Seneca language). The Seneca were among the original Five Nations of the Iroquois Confederacy and had occupied this territory for many hundreds of years prior to European encounter.

The Seneca village was located on the east side of the Genesee River, "about a mile above the ford". Ga:non'wagês was an important village to the Seneca during the eighteenth century. Their religious leader Handsome Lake was born here about 1735. One of his nephews, later known as Governor Blacksnake, moved here with his family shortly after his birth. He was an important war chief who allied with the British during the Revolutionary War; later he became one of the first Native Americans to publish his memoirs, aided by a fellow Seneca who translated them into English. An edited version of this memoir was published in 2005, with explanations of material about his people. The leader Cornplanter, a maternal uncle of Chainbreaker, was born in this village around 1750.

European-American (white) settlers did not reach any number until about 1785, after the Americans had gained independence in the Revolutionary War and forced the Iroquois nations who had been allied with the British to cede their lands in the region. Many of these new settlers were from New England and eastern New York. They organized the town in 1789 as "Hartford", and changed the name in 1808 to "Avon".

In the early 19th century, the village was noted as a spa and resort destination because of its nearby mineral springs. The village was incorporated in 1858. The Avon station on the Erie Railroad opened in 1865; railroads had superseded the Erie and related canals as the chief means of transportation of freight and passengers in the state. Avon was known historically in the late 19th and early 20th centuries for harness racing at the Avon Driving Park.

The Aaron Barber Memorial Building, Avon Inn, First Methodist Episcopal Church of Avon, Hall's Opera Block, and J. Francis Kellogg House are listed on the National Register of Historic Places.

== Geography ==
Avon is located at 42°54′37″N 77°44′51″W (42.91029, -77.747687). According to the United States Census Bureau, the village has a total area of 3.1 square miles (8.1 km^{2}), all land. The Genesee River forms the western boundary of the village. Avon is in the north part of Livingston County, near the border of Monroe County.

U.S. Route 20, New York State Route 5, and New York State Route 39 all were constructed to pass through the village or follow existing routes. Two miles to the east is Interstate 390. Rochester is 20 miles (32 km) to the north, Canandaigua is 24 miles (39 km) to the east, Geneseo, the Livingston county seat, is 9 miles (14 km) to the south, and Batavia is 24 miles (39 km) to the northwest.

== Demographics ==
Historical population
Census	Pop.	Note	%±
1840	600		—
1850	500		−16.7%
1860	879		75.8%
1870	900		2.4%
1880	1,617		79.7%
1890	1,653		2.2%
1900	1,601		−3.1%
1910	2,053		28.2%
1920	2,585		25.9%
1930	2,403		−7.0%
1940	2,339		−2.7%
1950	2,412		3.1%
1960	2,772		14.9%
1970	3,260		17.6%
1980	3,006		−7.8%
1990	2,995		−0.4%
2000	2,977		−0.6%
2010	3,394		14.0%
2020	3,399		0.1%
U.S. Decennial Census

As of the census of 2000, there were 2,977 people, 1,151 households, and 749 families residing in the village. The population density was 992.8 inhabitants per square mile (383.3/km^{2}). There were 1,215 housing units at an average density of 405.2 per square mile (156.4/km^{2}). The racial makeup of the village was 95.70% White, 1.85% Black or African American, 0.24% Native American, 0.81% Asian, 0.03% Pacific Islander, 0.24% from other races, and 1.14% from two or more races. Hispanic or Latino of any race were 0.97% of the population.

There were 1,151 households, out of which 34.1% had children under the age of 18 living with them, 52.2% were married couples living together, 9.6% had a female householder with no husband present, and 34.9% were non-families. 30.1% of all households were made up of individuals, and 13.8% had someone living alone who was 65 years of age or older. The average household size was 2.54 and the average family size was 3.20.

In the village, the population was spread out, with 27.8% under the age of 18, 6.1% from 18 to 24, 29.9% from 25 to 44, 21.4% from 45 to 64, and 14.7% who were 65 years of age or older. The median age was 37 years. For every 100 females, there were 90.2 males. For every 100 females age 18 and over, there were 83.4 males.

The median income for a household in the village was $40,109, and the median income for a family was $53,105. Males had a median income of $40,156 versus $27,470 for females. The per capita income for the village was $22,758. About 6.4% of families and 7.5% of the population were below the poverty line, including 8.7% of those under age 18 and 6.6% of those age 65 or over.
