= Barber–Mulligan Farm =

- U.S. National Register of Historic Places
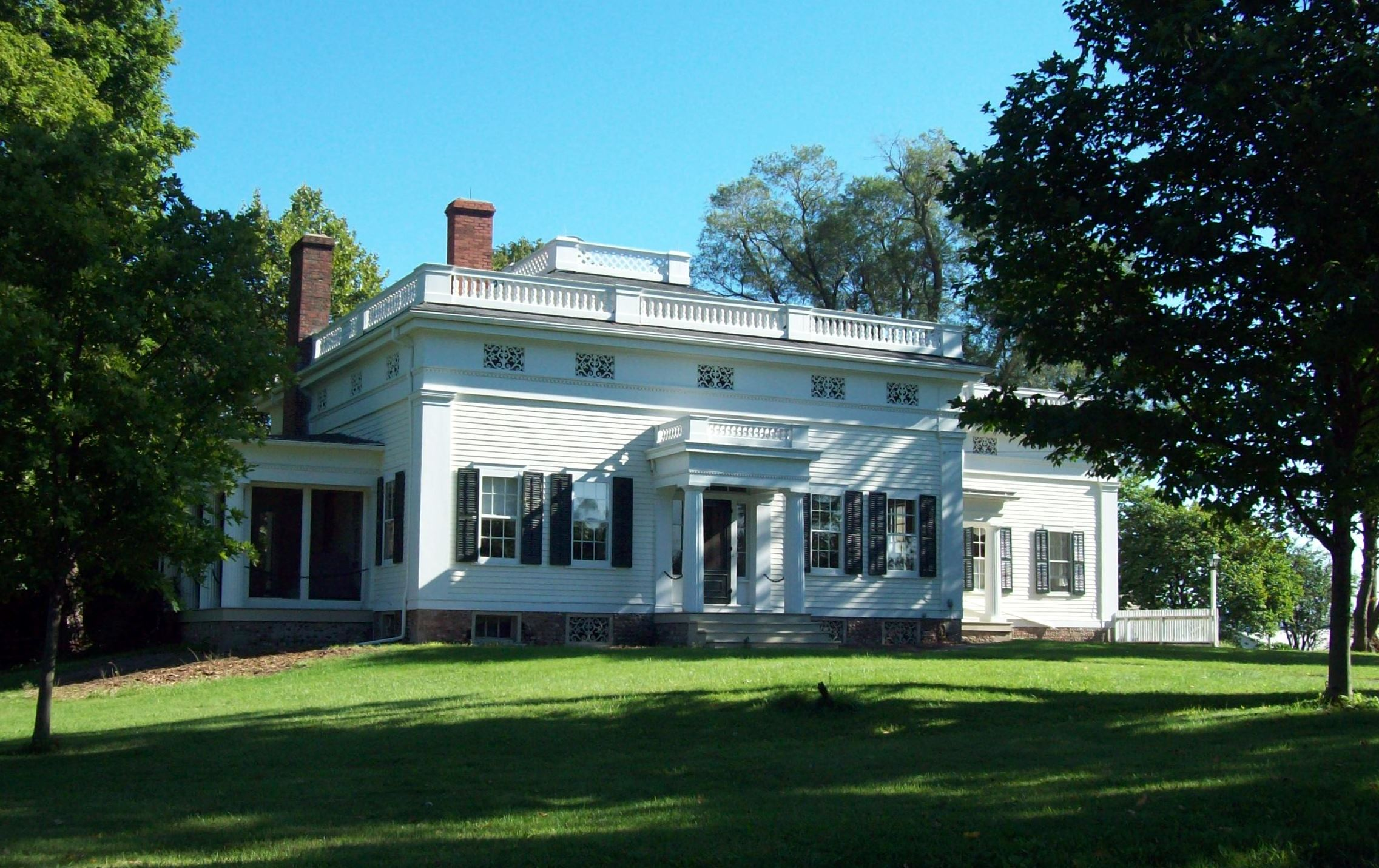
- Barber–Mulligan Farm, August 2010

- Location within New York Location within the United States
- Interactive map showing the location for Barber-Mulligan Farm
- Nearest city: Avon, New York
- Coordinates: 42°56′11″N 77°42′44″W
- Area: 637.1 acres (257.8 ha)
- Built: 1850
- Architectural style: Colonial Revival, Greek Revival, Italianate
- NRHP reference No.: 80002647
- Added to NRHP: May 19, 1980

Barber–Mulligan Farm is a historic farm located at Avon in Livingston County, New York. The nearly 640-acre (260 ha) farm includes a number of original buildings as well as many improvements. The most important cluster is the central farm complex which includes the main house, a carriage house, horse barn, and corn crib, all built in 1852 by Aaron Barber. The house is an example of late Greek Revival architecture. Not far from the main house is a cobblestone tenant house built c. 1828.

In July 2009, a lightning strike ignited a fire which destroyed the large connected complex of barns, the earliest of which were built in the 1870s. The house and earliest structures were preserved, as were all the modern dairy facilities. The farm boasts a cutting-edge Holstein milking operation of nearly 2000 cows as well as acreage in corn, wheat, and alfalfa.

Aaron Barber Jr. purchased the land in 1840 and built his homestead by 1852, and his son Aaron III continued the agrarian lifestyle, well known for his prize-winning herd of short-horn cattle. He sold the land to the Mulligan family in 1920, and the third and fourth generations are now running the operation.

It was listed on the National Register of Historic Places in 1980.
