= J. Francis Kellogg House =

Historic house in New York, United States

- U.S. National Register of Historic Places
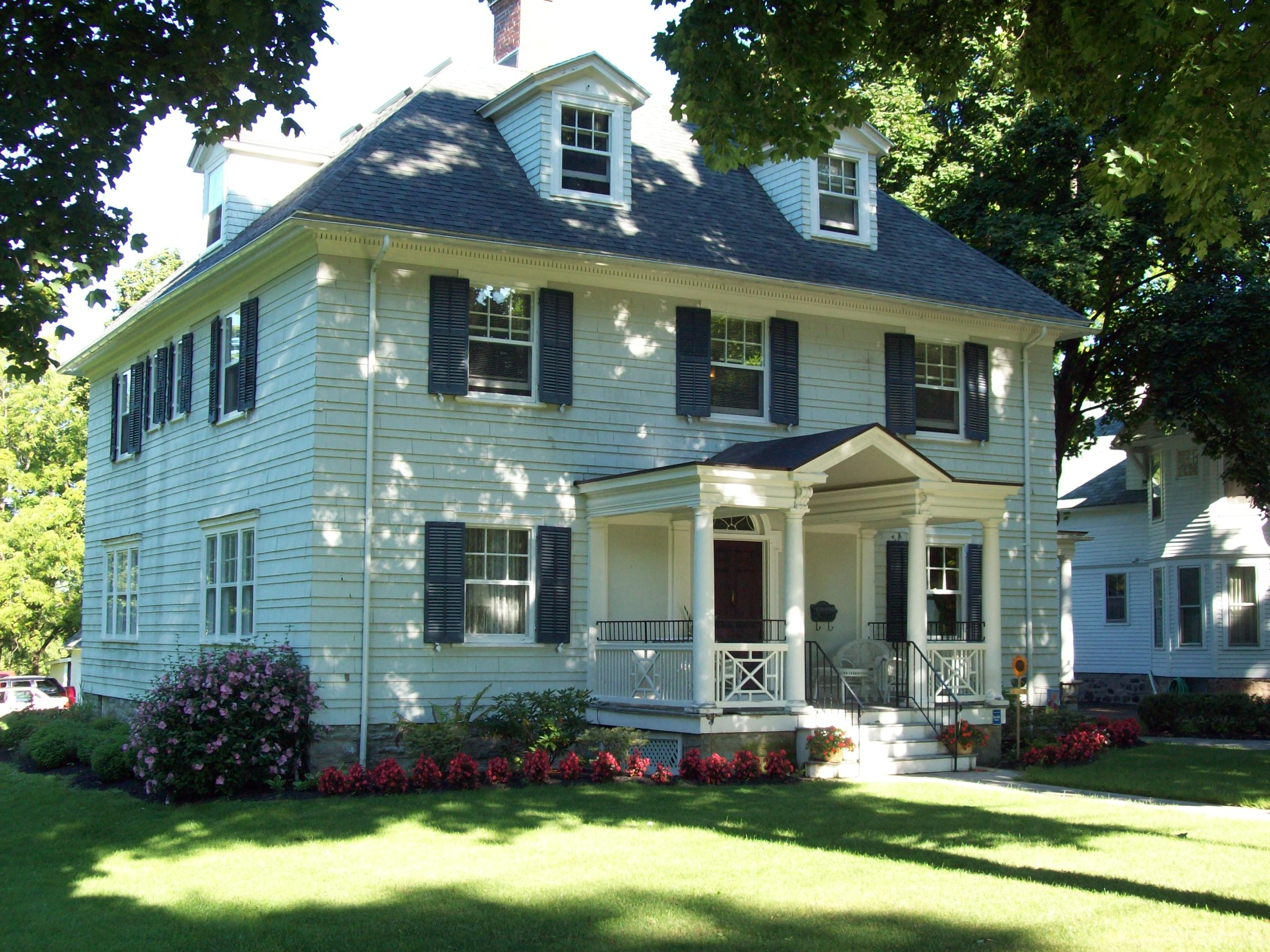
- J. Francis Kellogg House, August 2010

- Location within New York Location within the United States
- Location: 255 Genesee St., Avon, New York
- Coordinates: 42°54′22″N 77°44′55″W
- Area: 1 acre (0.40 ha)
- Built: 1908
- Architect: Bragdon, Claude
- Architectural style: Colonial Revival
- NRHP reference No.: 03000511
- Added to NRHP: June 05, 2003

J. Francis Kellogg House is a historic home located at Avon in Livingston County, New York. It is a Colonial Revival–style dwelling with Arts and Crafts influenced detailing constructed in 1908. It is a 2 1/2-story, square, frame residence with a flat topped hipped roof with dormers.

It was listed on the National Register of Historic Places in 1978.
