= Avon Inn =

- U.S. National Register of Historic Places
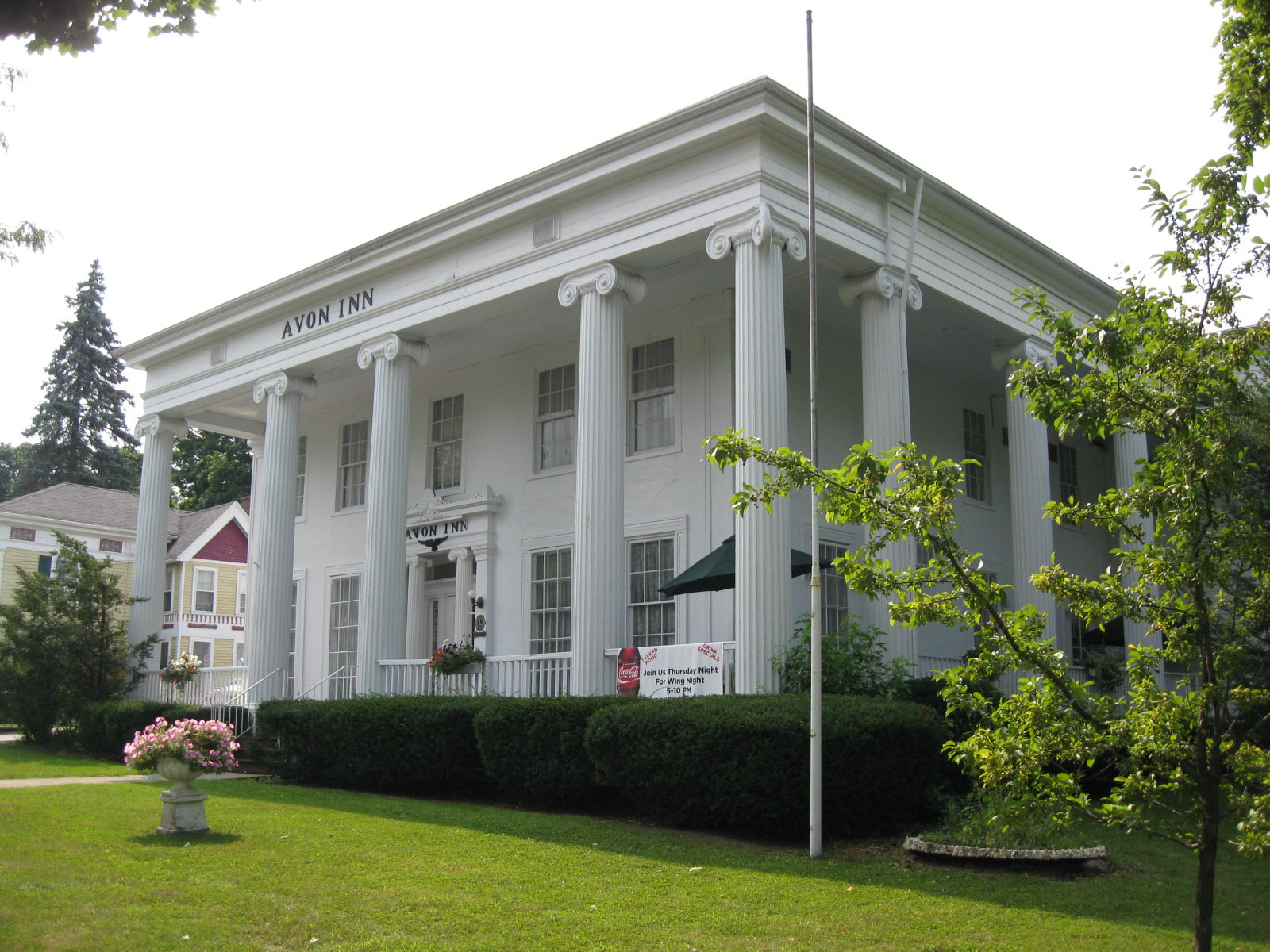
- Avon Inn, August 2009

- Location within New York Location within the United States
- Location: 55 E. Main St., Avon, New York
- Coordinates: 42°54′41″N 77°44′37″W
- Area: 1.8 acres (0.73 ha)
- Architectural style: Colonial Revival, Greek Revival
- NRHP reference No.: 91000423
- Added to NRHP: April 16, 1991

Avon Inn is an historic inn located in Avon, USA, in Livingston County, New York. The main block was built in the 1840s as a residence in the Greek Revival style. The five bay structure features a two-story portico supported by massive Ionic columns.

In 1882, the building was expanded and remodeled for use as a sanitarium. It was expanded and remodeled in 1912, when it was converted for use as an inn and banquet hall. At this time a notable Colonial Revival style dining room was added.

It was listed on the National Register of Historic Places on April 16, 1991.

In 2016, The Inn began significant renovations to reopen in 2018 under new ownership.
