= First Presbyterian Church of Avon =

Historic church in New York, United States

- U.S. National Register of Historic Places
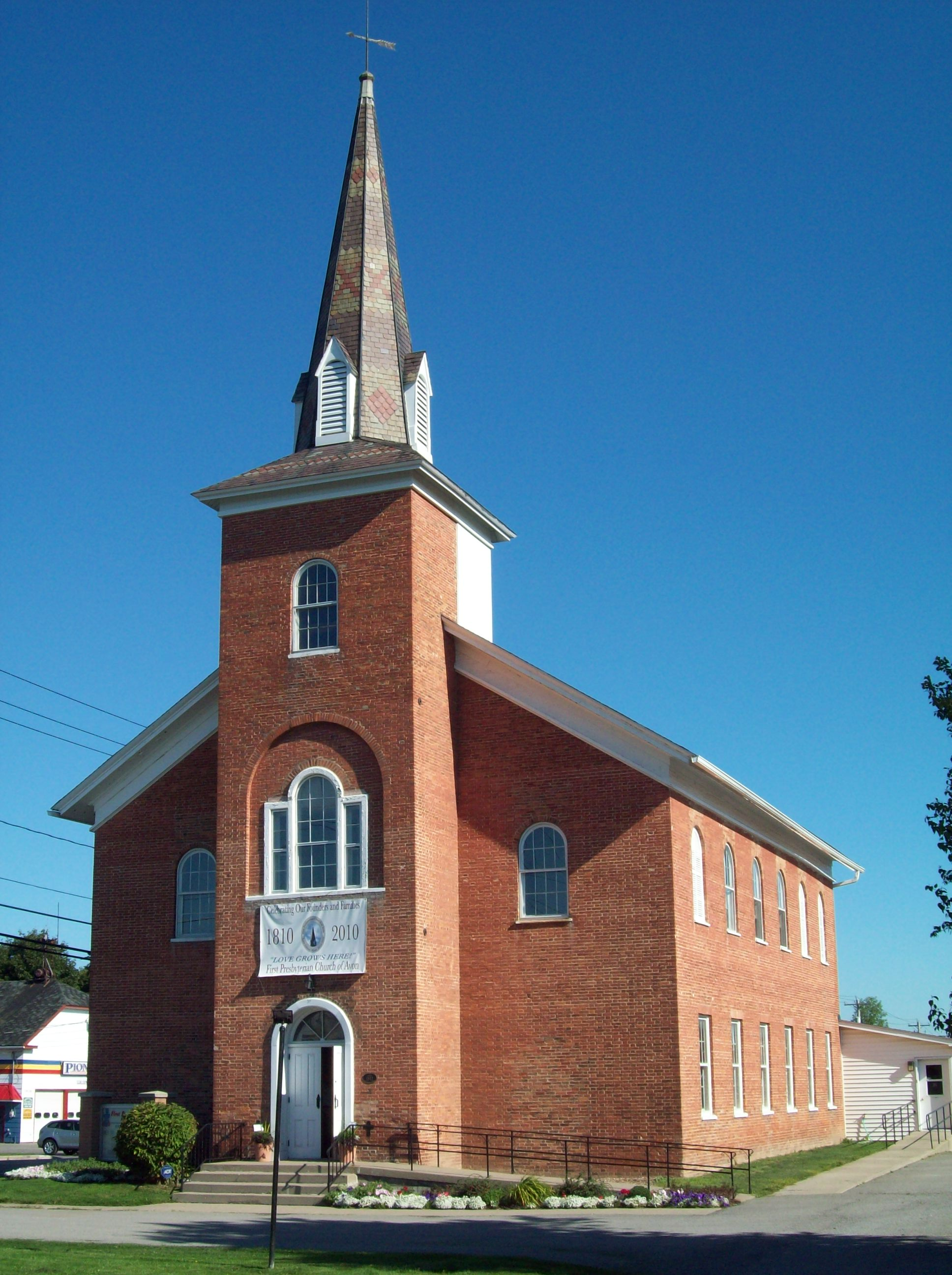
- First Presbyterian Church of Avon, August 2010

- Location within New York Location within the United States
- Location: 5605 Avon-Lima Rd., East Avon, New York
- Coordinates: 42°54′35″N 77°42′24″W
- Area: 1 acre (0.40 ha)
- Built: 1866
- Architectural style: Federal, Gothic Revival
- NRHP reference No.: 04001444
- Added to NRHP: January 5, 2005

First Presbyterian Church of Avon is a historic Presbyterian church located at East Avon in Livingston County, New York. It is a three- by six-bay Federal style brick building, approximately 46 feet by 60 feet. The center of the principal elevation features a three-story bell tower surmounted by a six sided, broached spire. Construction of the building started in 1812 and it was dedicated in 1827. In 1866 the existing church was renovated and the present tower added.

It was listed on the National Register of Historic Places in 2005.
