= Avon station (Erie Railroad) =

Railroad station in New York, U.S.

Avon Station
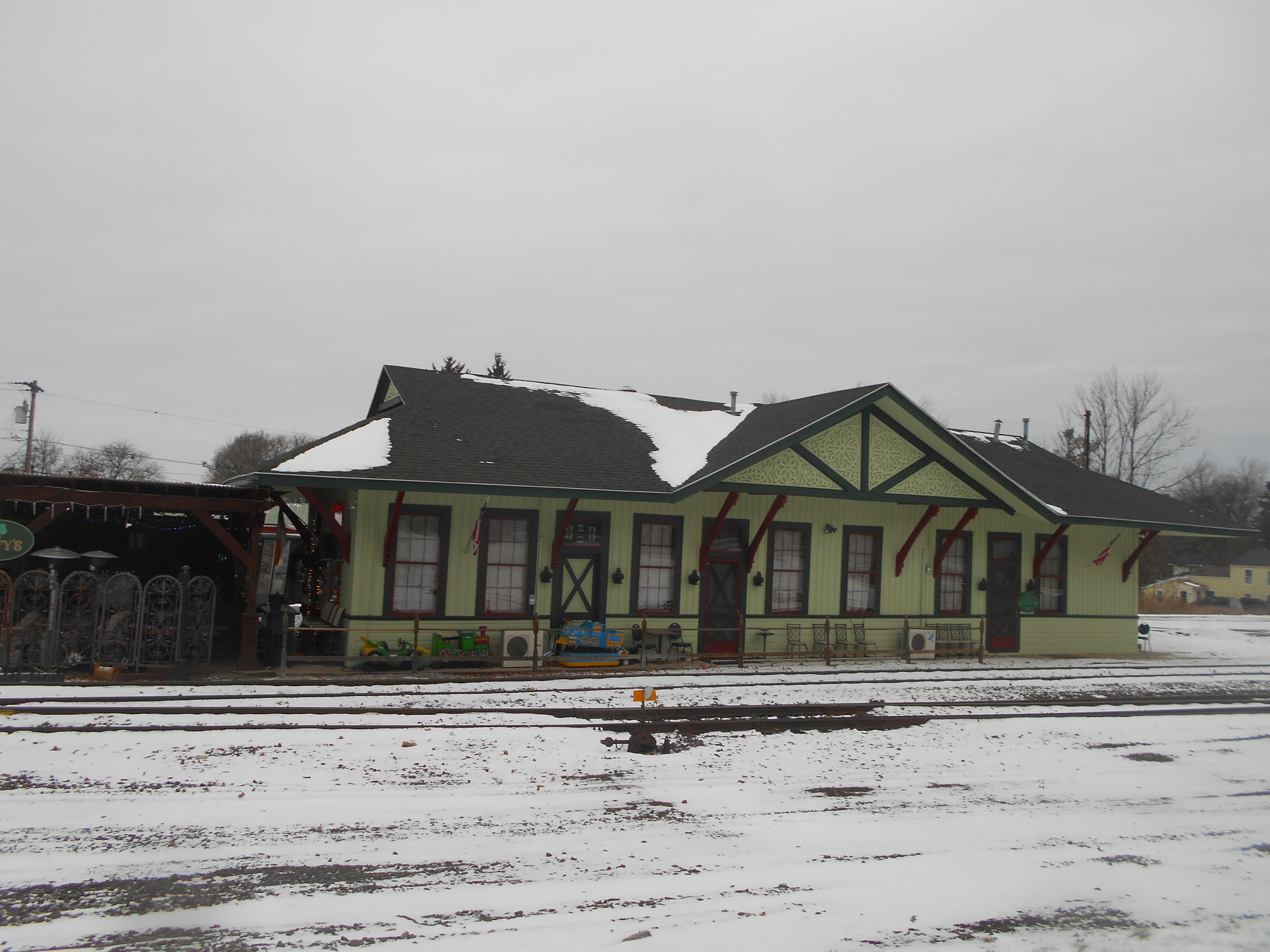
- The former Avon station in January 2015

General information
- Location: 100 West Main Street (US 20), Avon, New York 14414
- Coordinates: 42.914109°N 77.748003°W
- Lines: Rochester Division; Rochester Branch; Mount Morris Branch; Attica Branch
- Platforms: 1 side platform
- Tracks: 2

Other information
- Station code: 3943

History
- Opened: July 25, 1853
- Closed: April 30, 1933 - Attica Branch; January 20, 1940 -Mount Morris Branch; September 30, 1941 -Rochester Branch; September 28, 1947 - Rochester Division
- Rebuilt: 1879
- Electrified: June 8, 1907–December 1, 1934

Former services
Preceding station	Erie Railroad	Following station
McQueens toward Painted Post	Rochester Division	Terminus
Wiards toward Rochester	Rochester Branch	Terminus
Terminus	Mount Morris Branch	Spring Street toward Mount Morris
Caledonia toward Attica	Attica Branch	Terminus
Location

Avon Station is a former railroad station 3943 for the Erie Railroad, located at 100 West Main Street, Avon, Livingston County, New York.

== History ==
Railroad service in the village of Avon began on July 25, 1853, with the extension of the Buffalo, Corning and New York Railroad (a division of what was eventually known as the New York, Lake Erie & Western Railroad) from Wayland to Caledonia.

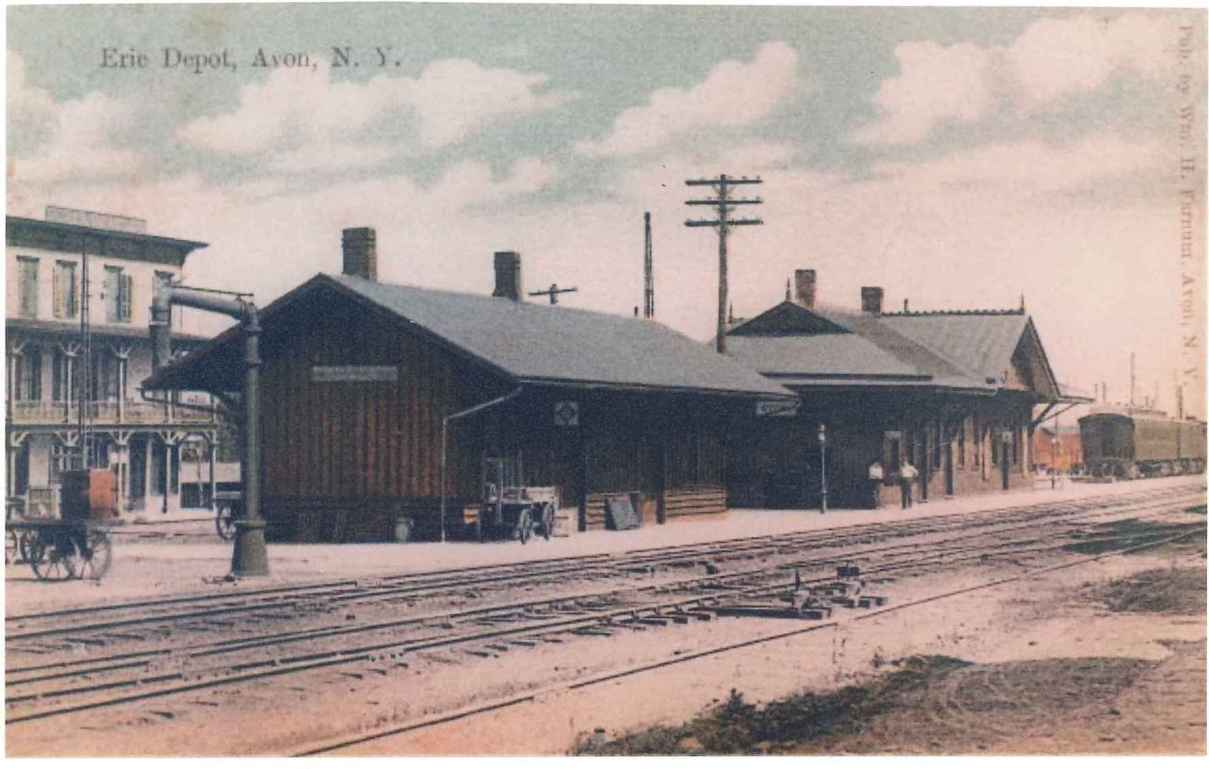
Avon Station prior to 1907

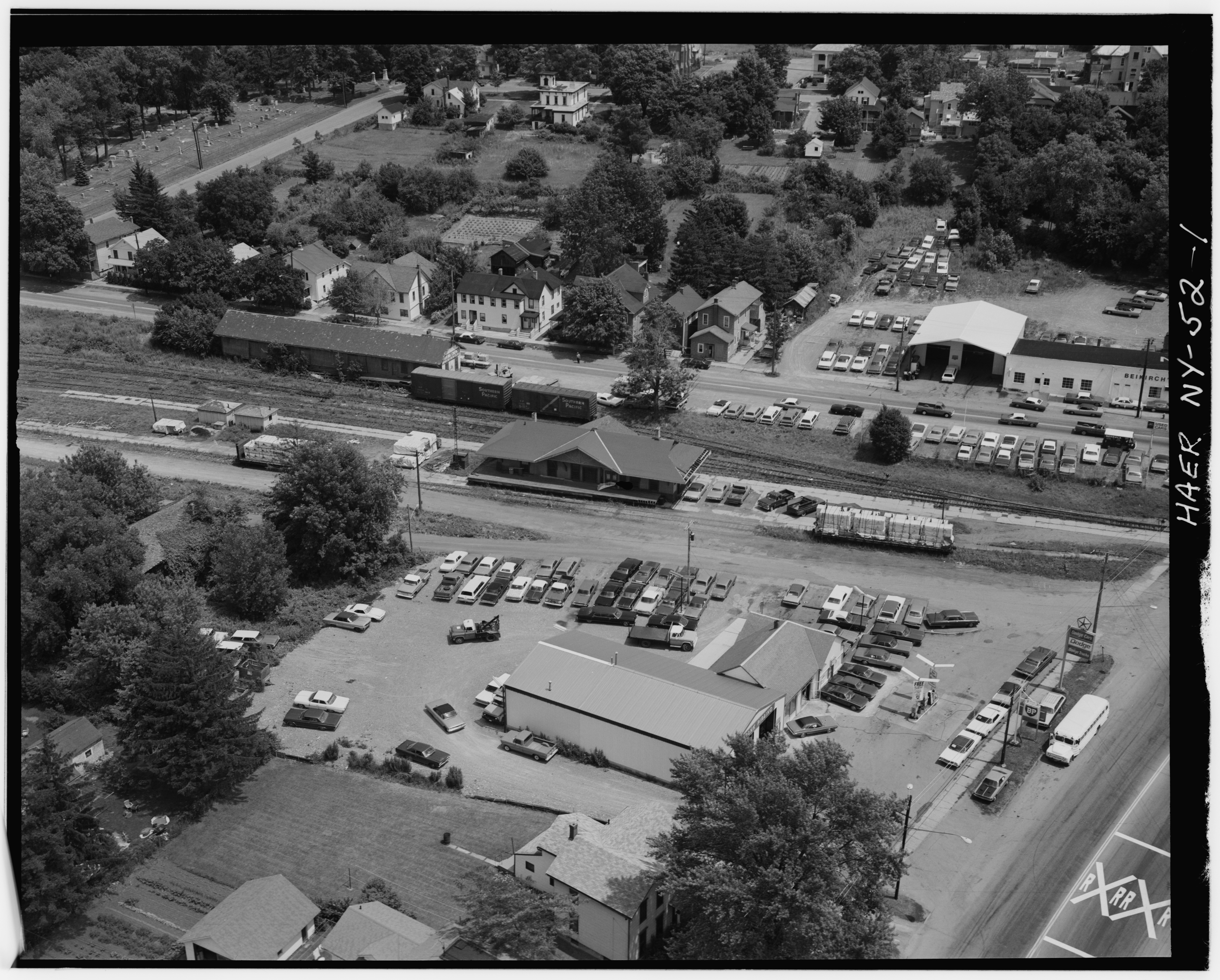
Aerial view of Avon Station, July 1971

The current station depot was built in 1879 for the New York, Lake Erie & Western Railroad (later known as the Erie Railroad). Designed by railroad company staff architect Bradford Gilbert, the Avon Station is a basic wooden frame structure with a stone foundation that is 80 by 24 feet (24.4 m × 7.3 m). Basic on photographs, the station building also has timbering and wooden support brackets, as well as ornamental cutwork above its entrance.

On June 18, 1907, the Avon Station was one of the few stops on the Erie Railroad to be electrified when service to Rochester became an electric service. The electric service ended on December 1, 1934, when the Erie switched to gas motorcars for passenger service to reduce costs.

One of the more active hubs of the Erie Railroad, Avon Station served as the terminus of four different Erie lines: the Rochester Division (Painted Post–Avon), the Rochester Branch (Rochester–Avon), the Mount Morris Branch (Mount Morris–Avon), and the Attica Branch (Avon–Attica, where connections were made to the Buffalo Division).

== Closing ==
Passenger service in Avon began to discontinue before and after electric service ended. Service between Attica and Avon ended on April 30, 1933. The branch to Mount Morris followed on January 20, 1940. Service to Rochester ended on September 30, 1941. The Rochester Division passenger service ended on September 28, 1947.
