= Greigsville, New York =

- Census-designated place
- Location within New York Location within the United States
- Coordinates: 42°49′50″N 77°53′49″W
- Country: United States
- State: New York
- County: Livingston
- Town: York

Area
  - Total: 0.71 sq mi (1.84 km^{2})
  - Land: 0.71 sq mi (1.84 km^{2})
  - Water: 0 sq mi (0.00 km^{2})
- Elevation: 751 ft (229 m)

Population (2020)
  - Total: 191
  - Density: 269/sq mi (103.8/km^{2})
- Time zone: UTC-5 (Eastern (EST))
  - Summer (DST): UTC-4 (EDT)
- ZIP Code: 14533 (Piffard)
- Area code: 585
- GNIS feature ID: 951801
- FIPS code: 36-30807

Greigsville is a hamlet and census-designated place (CDP) in the town of York, Livingston County, New York, United States. As of the 2020 census, Greigsville had a population of 191. The community is located at the intersection of New York State Route 36 and New York State Route 63.

== Geography ==
Greigsville is in northwestern Livingston County, in the southern part of the town of York. It is bordered to the south by Wadsworth, and Retsof is less than 1 mile (1.6 km) to the east. State Route 36 leads north 3 miles (5 km) to York hamlet and south 4 miles (6 km) to Leicester, while SR 63 leads southeast 5.5 miles (8.9 km) to Geneseo, the Livingston county seat, and northwest 19 miles (31 km) to Batavia.

According to the U.S. Census Bureau, the Greigsville CDP has an area of 0.71 square miles (1.8 km^{2}), all land. The northeast border of the CDP follows Bidwells Creek, an eastward-flowing tributary of the Genesee River.

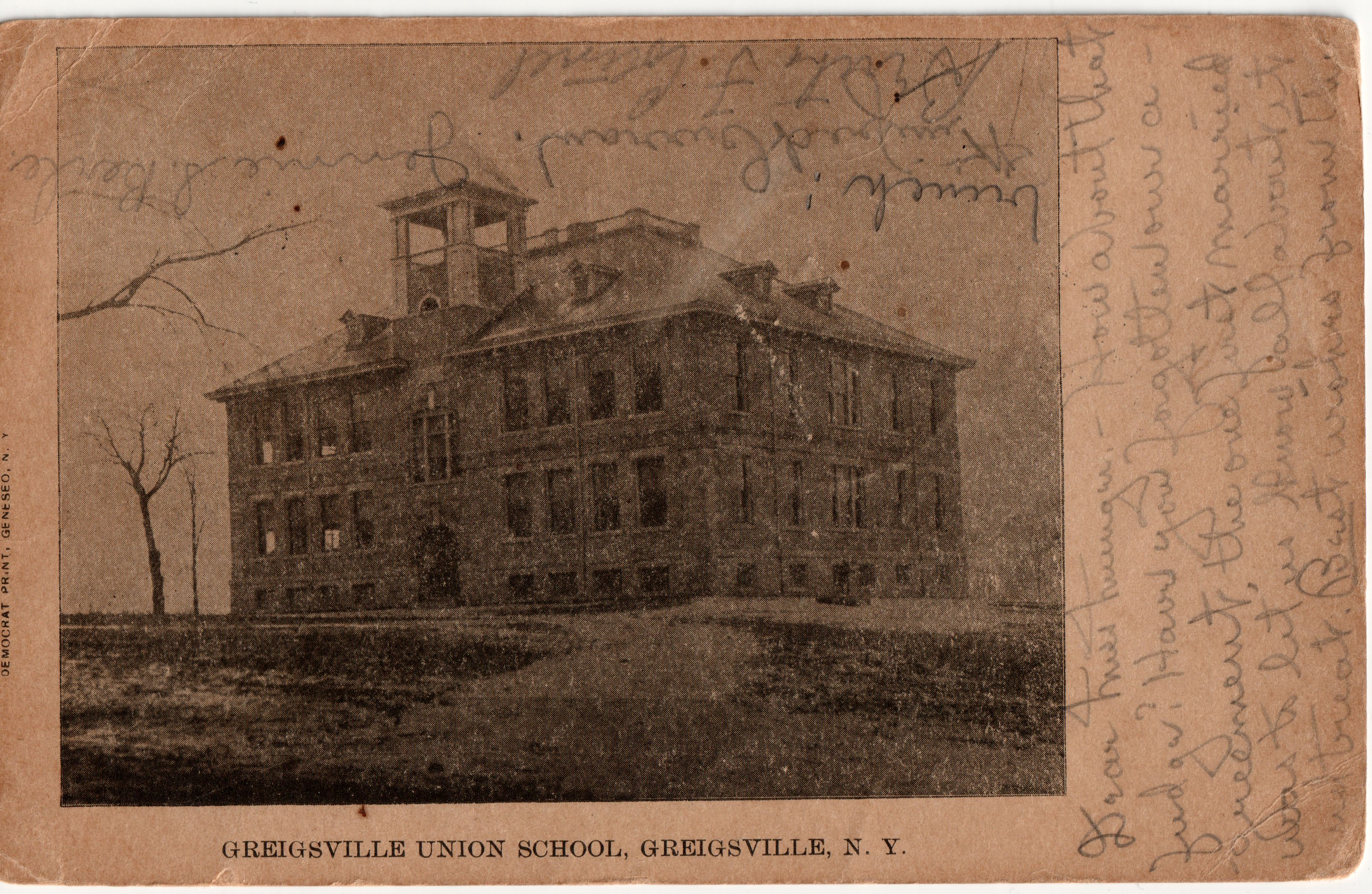
Griegsville Union School in 1906

== Demographics ==
Historical population
Census	Pop.	Note	%±
2020	191		—
U.S. Decennial Census
