= Wadsworth, New York =

- Census-designated place
- Location within New York Location within the United States
- Coordinates: 42°49′13″N 77°53′48″W
- Country: United States
- State: New York
- County: Livingston
- Town: York

Area
  - Total: 0.51 sq mi (1.33 km^{2})
  - Land: 0.51 sq mi (1.33 km^{2})
  - Water: 0 sq mi (0.00 km^{2})
- Elevation: 741 ft (226 m)

Population (2020)
  - Total: 173
  - Density: 338.1/sq mi (130.55/km^{2})
- Time zone: UTC-5 (Eastern (EST))
  - Summer (DST): UTC-4 (EDT)
- ZIP Code: 14533
- Area code: 585
- GNIS feature ID: 968628
- FIPS code: 36-77783

Wadsworth is a hamlet and census-designated place (CDP) in the town of York, Livingston, New York, United States. As of the 2020 census, Wadsworth had a population of 173. New York State Route 36 passes through the community.

== Geography ==
Wadsworth is in northwestern Livingston County, in the southern part of the town of York. It is bordered to the north by the hamlet of Greigsville. NY 36, Wadsworth's Main Street, leads north through Greigsville 3.5 miles (5.6 km) to the hamlet of York and south the same distance to Leicester. Geneseo, the Livingston county seat, is 5 miles (8 km) east of Wadsworth.

According to the U.S. Census Bureau, the Wadsworth CDP has an area of 0.5 square miles (1.3 km^{2}), all land. The area around Wadsworth drains south to Beards Creek, an eastward-flowing tributary of the Genesee River.

== Demographics ==
Historical population
Census	Pop.	Note	%±
2020	173		—
U.S. Decennial Census
