= Fowlerville, Livingston County, New York =

Fowlerville, New York
- Census-designated place
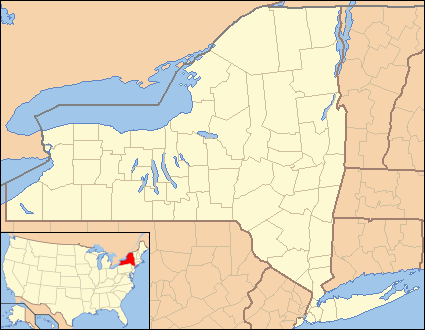
- Location in New York
- Coordinates: 42°53′36″N 77°50′44″W
- Country: United States
- State: New York
- County: Livingston
- Town: York

Area
  - Total: 0.90 sq mi (2.33 km^{2})
  - Land: 0.90 sq mi (2.33 km^{2})
  - Water: 0 sq mi (0.00 km^{2})
- Elevation: 636 ft (194 m)

Population (2020)
  - Total: 163
  - Density: 180.9/sq mi (69.83/km^{2})
- Time zone: UTC-5 (Eastern (EST))
  - Summer (DST): UTC-4 (EDT)
- ZIP Code: 14423 (Caledonia)
- Area code: 585
- FIPS code: 36-27133
- GNIS feature ID: 950550

Fowlerville is a hamlet and census-designated place (CDP) in the town of York in Livingston County, New York, United States. The population of the CDP was 227 at the 2010 census.

The community is named for Wells Fowler, the first settler.

It should not be confused with other New York hamlets named Fowlerville in Erie County and Sullivan County, or with the similarly named hamlet of Fowlersville in Lewis County

== Geography ==
Fowlerville is located in northwestern Livingston County at 42°53′36″N 077°50′44″W (42.8933955, -77.8455608), in the northeastern part of the town of York, at an elevation of 636 feet (194 m). It is 3 miles (5 km) northeast of York hamlet, 8 miles (13 km) northwest of Geneseo, the Livingston county seat, 6 miles (10 km) west of Avon, and 24 miles (39 km) southwest of Rochester.

According to the 2010 United States census, the Fowlerville CDP has a total area of 0.90 square miles (2.33 km^{2}), all land.

== Demographics ==
Historical population
| Census | Pop. | Note | %± |
|---|---|---|---|
| 2020 | 163 | | — |
U.S. Decennial Census
