= Retsof, New York =

- Census-designated place
- Location within New York Location within the United States
- Coordinates: 42°50′7″N 77°52′44″W
- Country: United States
- State: New York
- County: Livingston
- Town: York

Area
  - Total: 0.45 sq mi (1.17 km^{2})
  - Land: 0.45 sq mi (1.17 km^{2})
  - Water: 0 sq mi (0.00 km^{2})
- Elevation: 726 ft (221 m)

Population (2020)
  - Total: 326
  - Density: 723.5/sq mi (279.35/km^{2})
- Time zone: UTC-5 (Eastern (EST))
  - Summer (DST): UTC-4 (EDT)
- ZIP Code: 14539
- Area code: 585
- GNIS feature ID: 962414
- FIPS code: 36-61236

Retsof is a hamlet and census-designated place (CDP) within the town of York in Livingston County, New York, United States. The community, situated 30 miles (48 km) southwest of the city of Rochester, is off New York State Route 63 approximately one mile east of State Route 36. As of the 2020 census, Retsof had a population of 326.

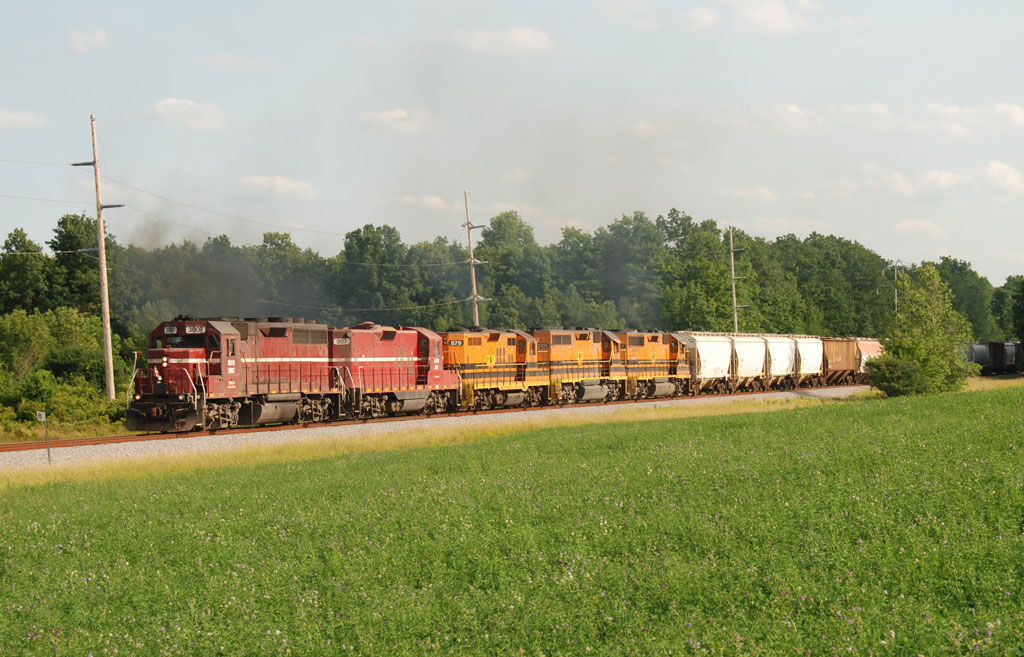
Rochester and Southern Railroad salt train just outside Retsof

It was founded by a man named William Foster, Jr., who reversed the letters of his name to name the town, and it was the site of one of the world's largest salt mines until its collapse in 1994. A new mine, the Hampton Corners mine, is located near Mount Morris, about 10 miles (16 km) to the southeast.

The original population of Retsof was mostly of Italian origin; they lived in a company town where the salt mine owned the houses and a store and maintained the small village. The Italian families lived together with a few non-Italians. The others who were mostly bosses lived on the "Avenue" in nicer houses with indoor plumbing.

In addition to the salt mine, there was a small railroad—the Genesee & Wyoming Railroad (G&W)—that took the salt to the "Main Lines" in neighboring towns. The G&W remains active today as a branch line of the Rochester & Southern Railroad.

== Geography ==
Retsof is in northwestern Livingston County, in the southeastern part of the town of York. It is bordered to the east by the hamlet of Piffard and to the west by Greigsville. NY 63 leads southeast from Retsof 4 miles (6 km) to Geneseo, the Livingston county seat, and northwest 20 miles (32 km) to Batavia. The hamlet of York is 3 miles (5 km) north of Retsof.

According to the U.S. Census Bureau, the Retsof CDP has an area of 0.5 square miles (1.2 km^{2}), all land. The community is drained by Salt Creek, a northward-flowing tributary of Bidwells Creek, which flows northeast to the Genesee River.

== Demographics ==
Historical population
Census	Pop.	Note	%±
2020	326		—
U.S. Decennial Census

== Retsof Salt Mine ==
In 1994, the Retsof Salt Mine was the largest salt mine in North America, and the second largest in the world. Three hundred people worked within the 6,000 acres (24 km^{2}; 9.4 sq mi) of excavated space, 1,000 feet (300 m) below ground, extracting salt from a natural deposit for use as road salt, table salt, and in industry. In March 1994, the ceiling in one of the large underground chambers collapsed, the first of a series of effects caused by groundwater entering the salt deposit, which had been dry for all of the 110 previous years of mining at the site. Over the next 21 months, the mine cavities collapsed and filled with water. Mining operations scrambled to work the accessible areas before the spreading flood, until operations were suspended when the mine was fully filled with water, in 1995. The effect of filling all this space lowered the aquifer, leaving many drinking water wells dry, and led to surface subsidence, even sinkholes 200 feet (61 m) wide, damaging structures and highways. 8–9 feet (2.4–2.7 m) of additional subsidence is expected to take place over the next century.

The U.S. Geological Survey studied the effects of the mine collapse on groundwater hydrology in the surrounding watershed.

== See also ==
- List of geographic names derived from anagrams and ananyms
