= Westerly (Piffard, New York) =

Historic house in New York, United States

- U.S. National Register of Historic Places
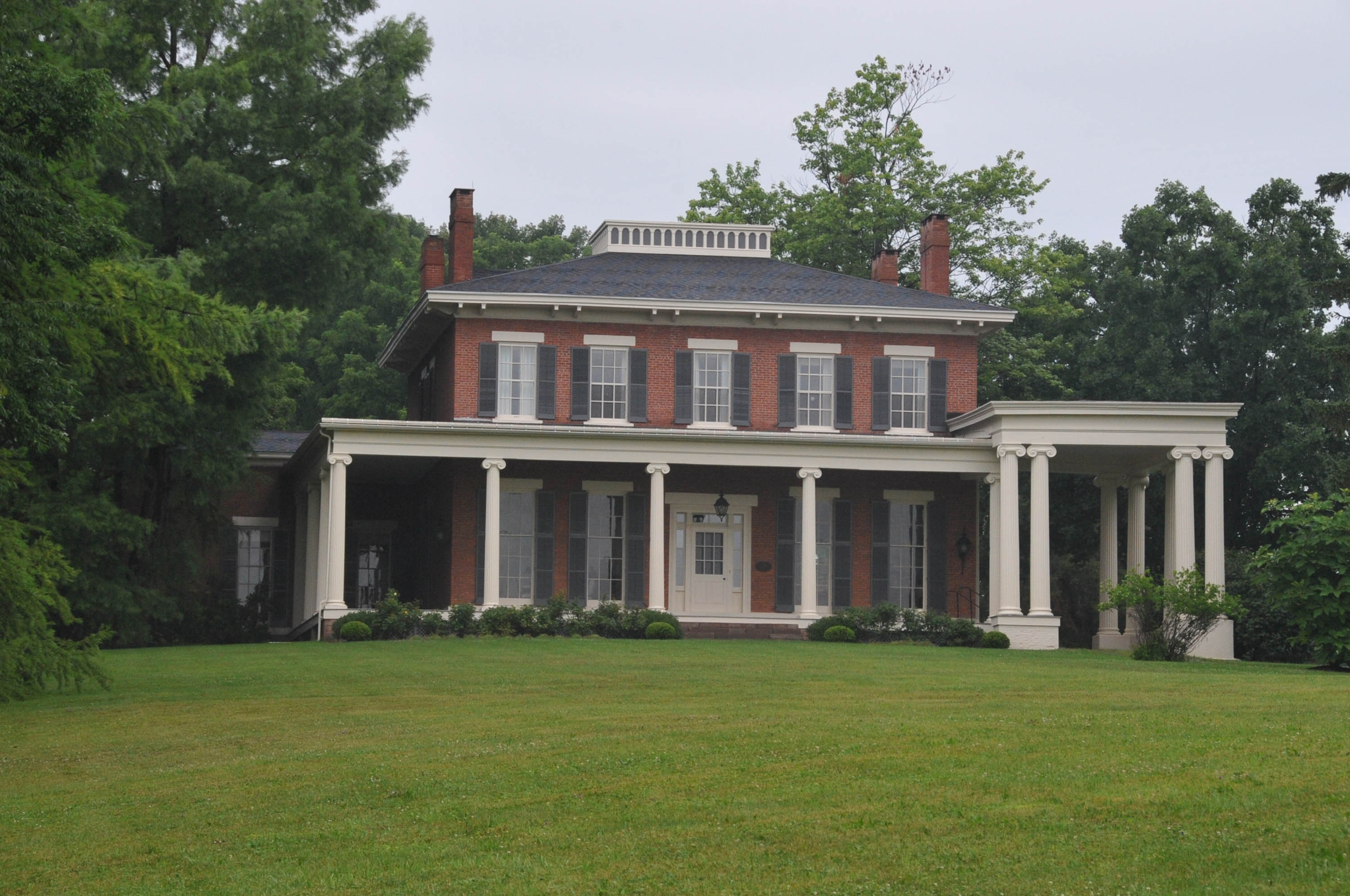

- Location within New York Location within the United States
- Location: Chandler Rd., Piffard, New York
- Coordinates: 42°49′14″N 77°51′16″W
- Area: 112 acres (45 ha)
- Built: 1850
- Architect: McBride
- Architectural style: Greek Revival, Italianate
- NRHP reference No.: 74001255
- Added to NRHP: December 19, 1974

Westerly is a historic home located at the hamlet of Piffard in Livingston County, New York. It was built in 1850 by a local builder named McBride. The two story brick house set on a stone foundation with a hipped roof and widow's walk, is thought to have followed plans in a builders handbook of the period and features subdued Greek Revival characteristics with a hint of Italian Villa design elements. The house was built by prominent early settlers Major and Mrs. William H. Spencer, whose son William Spencer married Julia Tyler, daughter of President John Tyler and Julia Gardiner Tyler in 1869. After her death in 1871, the home was sold to the Wadsworth family.

It was listed on the National Register of Historic Places in 1974.
