= Livingston County, New York =

County in New York, United States

- County
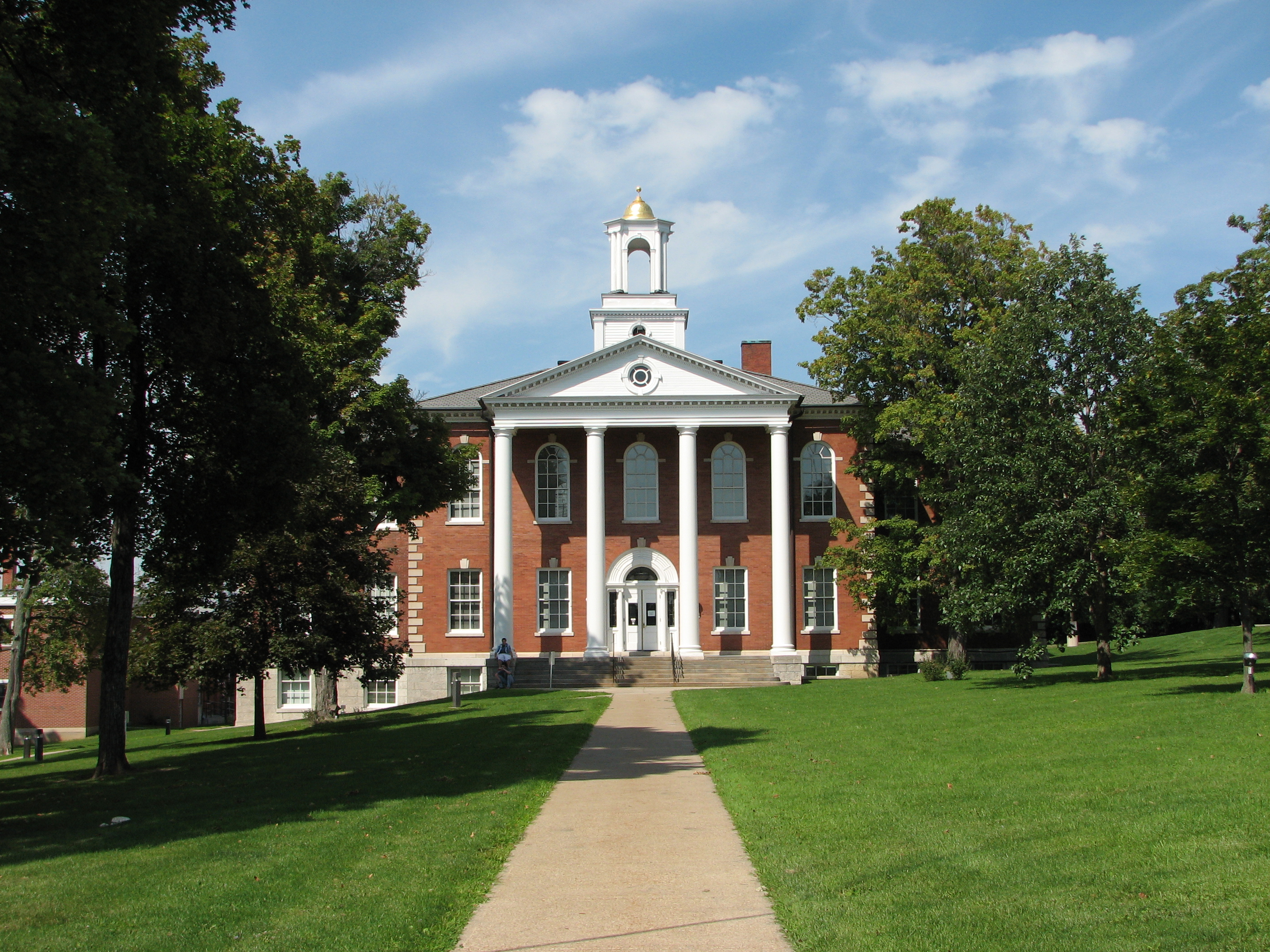
- Livingston County Courthouse

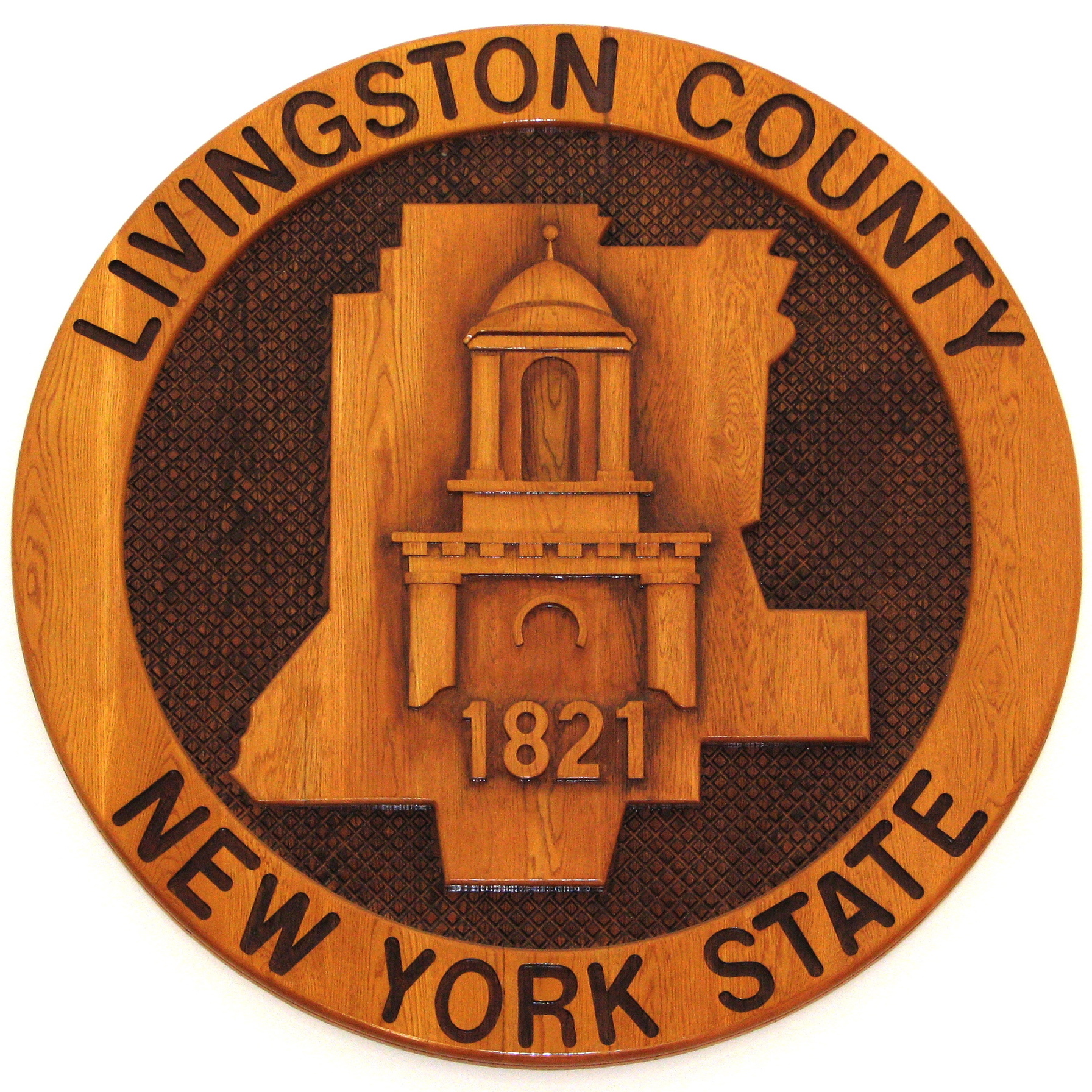
- Flag Seal

- Location within the U.S. state of New York
- Coordinates: 42°44′N 77°46′W
- Country: United States
- State: New York
- Founded: 1821
- Named for: Robert R. Livingston
- Seat: Geneseo
- Largest village: Geneseo

Area
  - Total: 640 sq mi (1,700 km^{2})
  - Land: 632 sq mi (1,640 km^{2})
  - Water: 8.5 sq mi (22 km^{2}) 1.3%

Population (2020)
  - Total: 61,834
  - Estimate (2025): 61,438 ▼
  - Density: 97.9/sq mi (37.8/km^{2})
- Time zone: UTC−5 (Eastern)
  - Summer (DST): UTC−4 (EDT)
- Congressional district: 24th
- Website: www.livingstoncountyny.gov

Livingston County is a county in the U.S. state of New York. As of the 2020 census, the population was 61,834. Its county seat is Geneseo. The county is named after Robert R. Livingston, who helped draft the Declaration of Independence and negotiated the Louisiana Purchase. The county is part of the Finger Lakes region of the state.

Livingston County is part of the Rochester, New York metropolitan area.

== History ==
On February 23, 1821, Livingston County, New York was formed from Ontario and Genesee Counties. The twelve original towns were: Avon, Caledonia, Conesus, Geneseo (county seat), Groveland, Leicester, Lima, Livonia, Mount Morris, Sparta, Springwater, and York.

Part of North Dansville was annexed from Steuben County in 1822 and became a separate town when Sparta was divided in 1846. At the same time, the town of West Sparta was also formed from Sparta. The towns of Nunda and Portage were annexed in 1846 and the town of Ossian was annexed in 1857 from Allegany County.

Avon, Williamsburgh, and the hamlet of Lakeville competed for the honor of becoming the Livingston County seat, but the distinction was bestowed upon Geneseo, the principal village and center of commerce. The Wadsworths donated a suitable lot, beautifully situated at the north end of the village. The brick courthouse faced Main Street, the jail of wood construction was built directly west, and a one-story cobblestone building for the County Clerk's office was built east of the courthouse. Until construction was completed in 1823, court was held in the upper story of the district school on Center Street (east of the present-day Livingston County Museum) and prisoners were housed in Canandaigua. In 1829 the county opened a poor house farm just outside the village.

=== Livingston County Flag ===
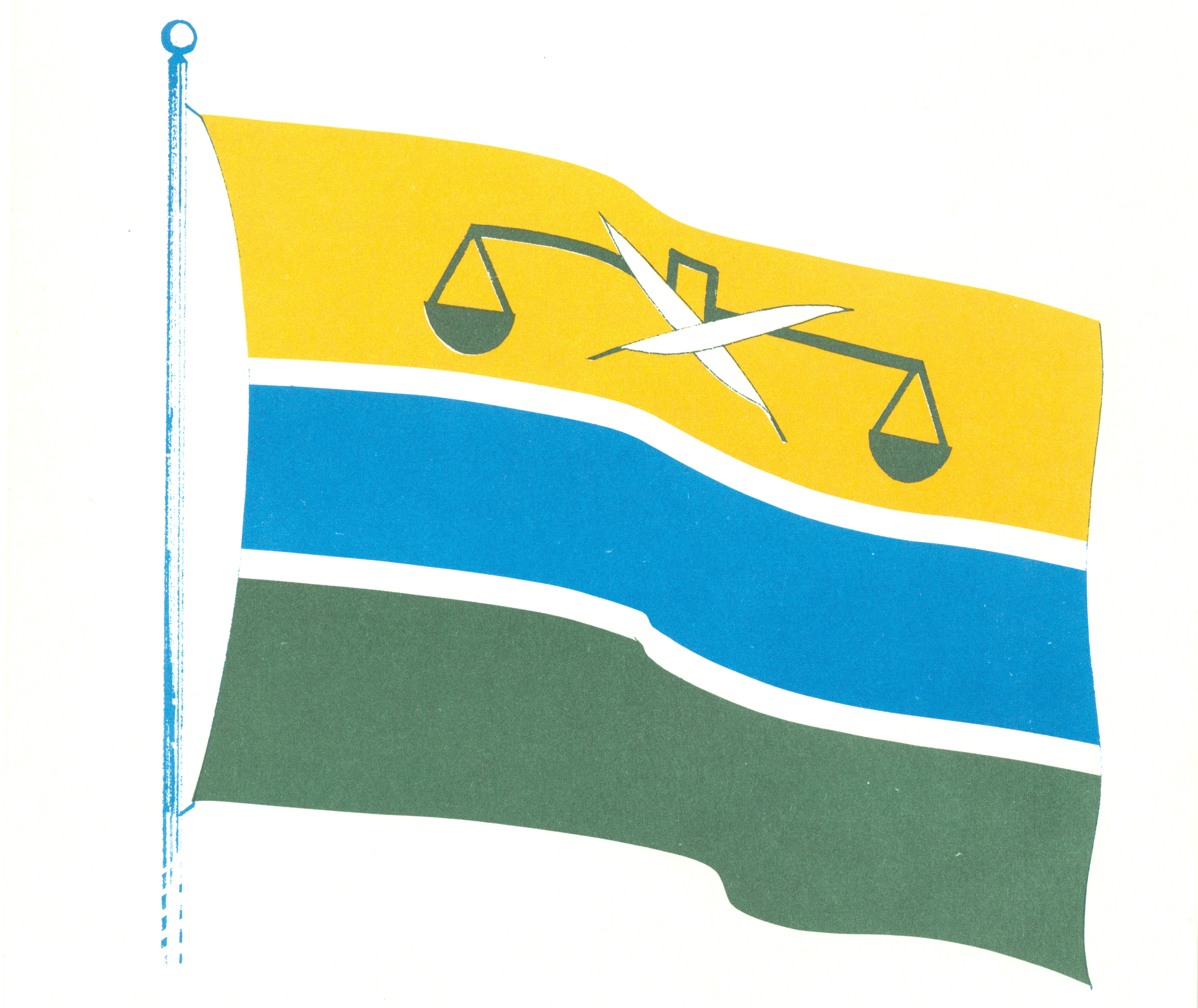
Livingston County Flag

The County Flag was adopted in 1971 for the county's 150th anniversary. The significance of the colors and design relates to features and history of the county:

Yellow – the golden grain of the northern towns;

Blue – the Genesee River;

Green – the forests in the southern towns;

White – salt and limestone, prominent minerals in the county;

Balance and crossed quills – in honor of New York's first Chancellor Robert R. Livingston, for whom the county was named.

== Senecas and Pioneer history ==
The Seneca Nation of Indians, once the most numerous and powerful of the Six Nations of the Iroquois, were called the "Keepers of the Western Door" because they guarded the western boundaries of the Haudenosaunee territory, which included the lands around Seneca Lake west to Lake Erie. Many of the principal towns were in the fertile Genesee Valley, part of what is now Livingston County. Little Beard's Town, or Genesee Castle, located near present-day Cuylerville in the Town of Leicester, was one of the largest.

=== Sullivan Campaign of the Revolutionary War ===
In 1779, General George Washington ordered General John Sullivan to organize the largest American offensive movement of the Revolutionary War to displace the Iroquois and gain control of New York's western frontier. Sullivan's army of approximately 5000 men trekked into the heart of the Seneca territory with orders to destroy all settlements.

On September 13, 1779, hundreds of Indians and Loyalists ambushed roughly 25 of Sullivan's scouts on a hill overlooking Conesus Lake at a site now known as the Ambuscade in the town of Groveland. At least 16 Americans were massacred including an Oneida guide. Scout leader Lt. Thomas Boyd and Sgt. Michael Parker were captured and their mutilated remains were discovered a day later when the army reached Little Beard's Town in Cuylerville, a hamlet in the town of Leicester. This site was the largest Indian settlement in western New York and the western limit of the Sullivan Campaign. Sullivan's army found the village deserted as most of the Indians and Loyalists had retreated west to Fort Niagara to avoid confrontation.

The army buried Boyd and Parker then burned the village and thousands of surrounding acres of crops. Upon retreat, the army discovered the bodies of the soldiers of Lt. Boyd's scouting party at the Ambuscade and buried them with military honors.

After fulfilling General Washington's instructions to destroy more than 40 Indian settlements and food supplies throughout the Finger Lakes, Sullivan's army returned to Easton, Pennsylvania. The mission was considered successful and helped to lessen the threat to white settlers across the state.

The enthusiasm generated by soldiers of General Sullivan's army prompted the rapid development of the Genesee Valley and the area that now comprises Livingston County. Within five years following the Treaty of Paris in 1783, ending the Revolutionary War, colonists branched out from well-established settlements in New England and the Mid-Atlantic states, with visions of reaping the benefits this vast wilderness land had to offer. News of the beauty and fertility of the area spread as far as Western Europe.

=== Seneca treaties ===
The destruction of the Iroquois villages during the Sullivan Campaign greatly impoverished the Senecas but did not deprive them of title to the land. This led to the creation of a series of treaties in order to facilitate westward expansion of white settlers. These treaties were not all supported by the Iroquois and consequently forever altered their culture.

After the Treaty of Paris, Messrs. Phelps and Gorham purchased from Massachusetts the rights to approximately eight million acres west of what is referred to as the old Pre-emption Line. The two men negotiated a treaty with the Seneca which was intended to extinguish Indian claims to this land. Approximately two-thirds of present-day Livingston County was covered by this treaty.

In 1790, Phelps and Gorham sold about 1,200,000 acres to Robert Morris, known as the "financier of the American Revolution." Morris then sold the land to a company of English capitalists, with Sir William Pulteney obtaining the majority interest. Charles Williamson, agent for Pulteney, took an absolute conveyance of the "Genesee Tract." The first permanent white settlement he established was the small village Williamburgh in Groveland at the confluence of the Genesee River and the Canaserega Creek. The village prospered until 1806 before it was abandoned.

The remainder of the original purchase was bought by Samuel Ogden in 1791 for Robert Morris, who then sold most of it to the Holland Land Company, reserving 500,000 acres, known as the Morris Reserve. By the terms of the sale, Morris obligated himself to extinguish the Indian title to the land sold. However, his involvement in land speculation left him penniless and imprisoned for debt for several years.

The 1794 Treaty of Canandaigua recognized the sovereignty of the Six Nations and restored their title to lands in western New York. But as pressure by western developers increased, the Treaty of Big Tree in 1797 was negotiated in the Wadsworth brothers' log cabin in Geneseo. This treaty included the western one-third of Livingston County and extinguished Indian title to practically all the lands west to the Niagara Frontier, excepting a handful of Indian reservations.

=== The Pioneer Wadsworths ===
Col. Jeremiah Wadsworth of Hartford, Connecticut, one of the wealthiest and most influential men in the post-Revolutionary War era, invested heavily in land speculation in this region. In 1788, he made the arduous trip to the Genesee country to judge its worth and finding it unimaginably rich. After purchasing more than 200,000 acres (50 square miles) along the Genesee River, Col. Wadsworth offered his young cousins, brothers James and William Wadsworth, 2000 acres of prime farmland in and around what is now Geneseo. In return, they represented the Colonel's interests by establishing a home farm (known as the Homestead) and promoting settlement and progress.

The Wadsworth brothers acquired thousands more acres, becoming the largest single landowners in western New York. They leased the majority of the land to tenant farmers with generous lease agreements. James and William were known far and wide for their philanthropy and innovative farming methods. The legacy of James and William Wadsworth and their vast land holdings has been carried forward generation after generation and the prominent family still remains synonymous with the Genesee Valley to present day.

=== Genesee Valley Canal ===
The opening of the Erie Canal in 1825 brought prosperity across the state and realization of the benefits of internal navigation. The Genesee Valley lacked access to broader markets other than via the Genesee River, often too dangerous to navigate. Planners envisioned a lateral canal, cutting through the core of Livingston County, as the means of uniting the Erie Canal with the Allegany River, thereby connecting the Ohio and Mississippi Rivers, allowing freight and passenger transportation all the way to New Orleans.

Construction of the Genesee Valley Canal started in Rochester in 1837, reaching Mount Morris by 1840. A junction to Sonyea opened in 1841 and then a branch was built to Dansville, completing 52 miles. Extending the canal through to Nunda and Portage was most challenging, as workers battled the area's most rugged terrain along the Genesee River gorge. After years of delays, 17 locks between Nunda and Portageville were completed in 1851.

By the time that the last segment connecting to the Allegany River was finally finished in 1862, however, railroad technology had outpaced canals. This forced the Genesee Valley Canal to close by 1878; the towpath became the bed of the Genesee Valley Canal Railroad. Railroads rapidly became the primary mode of transportation as they criss-crossed the entire county. Although the Genesee Valley Canal was short-lived, the lasting effect expanded job opportunities for thousands of new immigrants, opened markets for the area's abundant goods, and overall enriched the quality of life for residents.

Today, the old Genesee Valley Canal Railroad bed has become part of the Genesee Valley Greenway Trail.

== Important sites and events ==
=== Genesee Wesleyan Seminary, Lima ===
One of the first coeducational schools in the country, incorporated 1834, founded by the Genesee Conference of the Methodist Episcopal Church and operated until 1941. Genesee College, founded on the same site in the 1840s, eventually relocated and became Syracuse University. Presently the site is occupied by Elim Bible Institute.

=== Water Therapy: Avon Springs and the Jackson Sanitarium ===
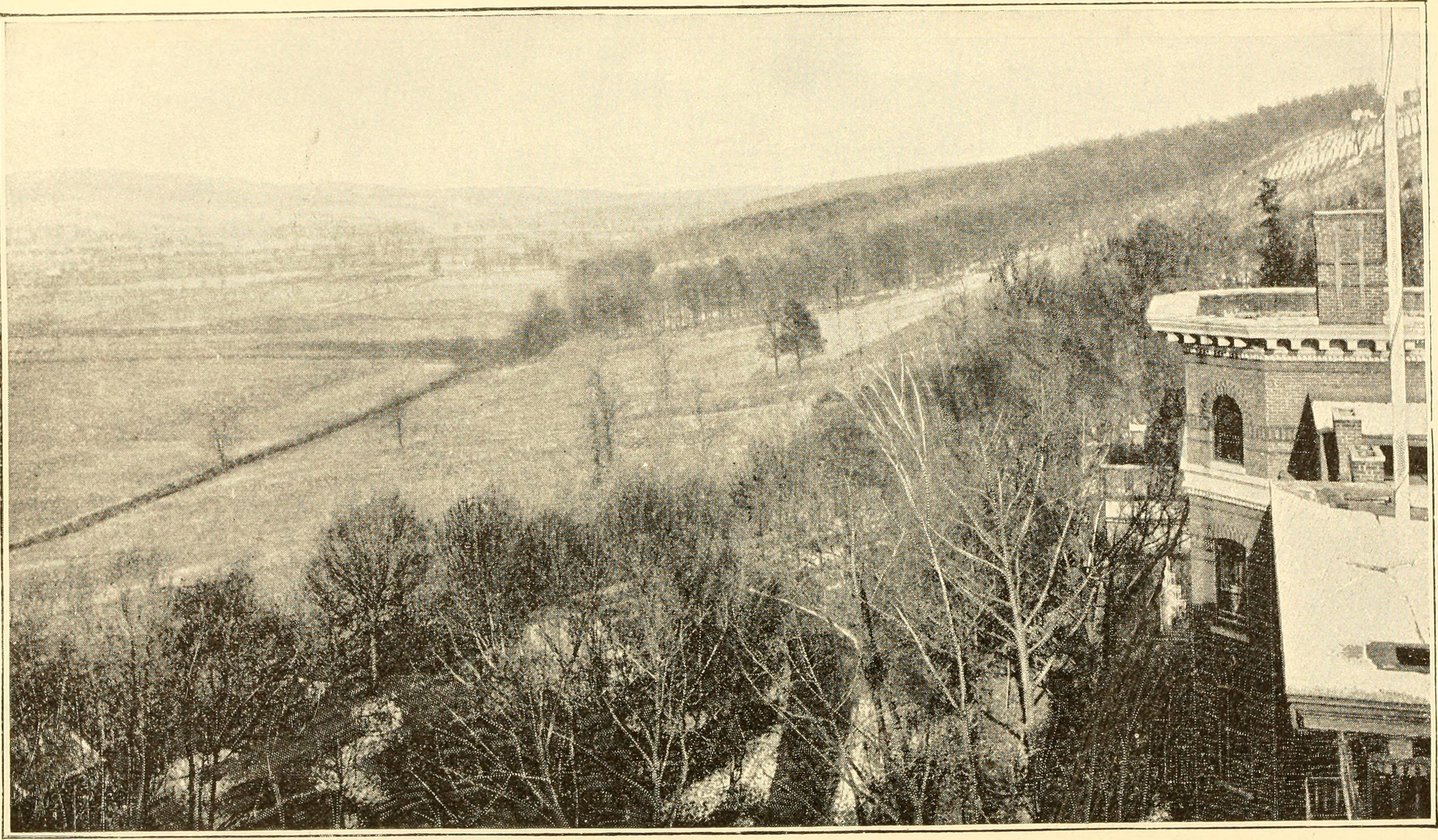
View from Sanitorium, 1890s

The area around present-day Avon and eastern Caledonia was known by the Seneca as "Canawaugus", or "the place of stinking waters" due to the prevalence of sulfur in the springs on the west side of town. The Seneca believed the water's mineral characteristics had health benefits long before the white settlers arrived. In 1821, Richard Wadsworth was the first white man in Avon to build a showering box and promote the curative properties of the sulfur water. The reputation of Avon Springs grew throughout the 19th century, peaking just before the Civil War era. Guests sought health cures as well as relaxation and recreation opportunities in the Genesee Valley. By about 1900, most of the numerous hotels and spas were gone.

Nunda and Dansville also boasted mineral springs and attracted travelers from around the world to enjoy the medicinal effects of water therapy. Most well-known was the sprawling resort in Dansville operated by James C. Jackson, a leading holistic health advocate and abolitionist. Jackson is credited with inventing Granula, America's first cold breakfast cereal, and along with Harriet Austen, endorsed exercise and less constraining clothes for women. The resort stayed in the Jackson family until the early 1900s. During World War I, the sanitarium was used by the federal government as a hospital for wounded soldiers. In 1929, bodybuilder Bernarr Macfadden bought the facility and named it the Physical Culture Hotel. His larger-than-life personality and national magazine with the same name boosted the popularity of the place into the 1950s.

=== The Shakers of Groveland ===
The only Shaker colony in western New York began moving from Sodus, Wayne County, New York to the hamlet of Sonyea in Groveland in 1836. The Shakers practiced celibacy, agrarian communal living, and self-sufficiency.

The Groveland site was convenient as a stopping place for Shakers traveling between their western societies in Ohio and their parent village at New Lebanon, New York. The 1,700-acre farm, with its fertile flatlands and the access to the Genesee Valley Canal benefited the Shakers' cottage industries. They made flat brooms, dried apples, dried sweet corn, and fancy goods such as sewing boxes.

Groveland's Shaker population peaked with 148 members in 1836. In 1857, they had 130 members, which shrank to 57 in 1874. Shaker membership everywhere had diminished to the point where the society had to begin consolidating its population at fewer sites. In 1892, the remaining 34 Groveland members moved to the North Family of the Shaker community at Watervliet, New York.

After the Shakers left Groveland, State of New York paid the Shakers $115,000 for the buildings and 1,800 acres of land at Groveland, for the Craig Colony for Epileptics.

Several diaries and journals from the Shakers' early years at Groveland can be found at the Western Reserve Historical Society, Cleveland, Ohio. These manuscripts are also available on microfilm at more than 20 locations throughout the U.S.

=== Civil War regiments ===
Three Civil War regiments were organized in Livingston County. The 104th New York Volunteer Infantry or 'Wadsworth Guards', named in honor of Gen. James S. Wadsworth, formed September 1861 at Geneseo. The camp was located at the head of North Street in the village and known as Camp Union. The two other regiments were organized at Portage near present-day Letchworth State Park. In 1862, the 130th Infantry regiment formed and later converted to a cavalry unit known as the 1st New York Dragoons. The same year the 136th Infantry Regiment, also known as the 'Ironclads', was organized.

=== The Caledonia Fish Hatchery ===
Rochester native Seth Green's groundbreaking experiments in artificial fish propagation led to the establishment of the first fish hatchery in the Western Hemisphere in Caledonia in 1864. The hatchery is managed by the Department of Conservation and has remained active into the 21st century.

=== Genesee Valley Hunt ===
The Livingston County Hunt was established in 1876 by Maj. William Austin Wadsworth. By the early 1880s, the organization was called the Genesee Valley Hunt and the Valley became known as the fox-hunting center of North America. The Genesee Valley Hunt remains active and is one of the oldest in the U.S.

=== Salt mining ===
Salt was discovered more than 1000 feet below the surface in Livingston County in the early 1880s. Salt mines opened in the towns of Leicester (Cuylerville), Livonia, Mount Morris, and York (Retsof). The Retsof mine became the largest salt-producing mine in the United States and the second largest in the world. The industry was a major employer throughout most of the 20th century until the mine collapsed and flooded in 1994. American Rock Salt opened a new mine in 1997 at Hampton Corners in the Town of Groveland and soon afterwards became the largest operating salt mine in the U.S.

=== Murray Hill, Mt. Morris ===
Once the terrestrial lands of the Seneca Indians, a wide area in Western New York known as the Mt. Morris Tract was purchased in 1807 by four couples – Mr. and Mrs. John R. Murray Sr., Mr. and Mrs. William Ogden, Mr. and Mrs. John Trumbull, all of New York City, and Mr. and Mrs. James Wadsworth of Geneseo.

In 1837, the land was subdivided and John R. Murray Jr. established a home on the property that would be known as "Murray Hill." He brought his bride, Anna Vernon Olyphant of New York City, to live in a simple but elegant mansion overlooking the Genesee Valley. The couple improved the grounds with formal gardens and Fish Ponds and entertained distinguished guests for the next 25 years.

Over the course of the next seven decades, the estate had a succession of proprietors. In 1882, while under the ownership of Col. Charles Shepard and wife, a fire completely destroyed the Murray mansion. A new, less magnificent home was built together with extensive barns and stables.

By 1930, New York State was seeking a site in the area for one of three new tuberculosis sanatoriums to help control and prevent a disease that was the cause of nearly 4000 deaths in upstate New York that year. Although Livingston County had a low rate of tuberculosis as compared to urban centers, the Murray Hill site was chosen as the ideal spot for this facility to serve the western region due to its central location, favorable weather, easy accessibility to rail lines and state roads, and proximity to advanced healthcare centers at Craig Colony in Sonyea and Strong Hospital in Rochester. All of these factors, including the restorative nature of the surroundings and the strong community support, added to the desirability and were pivotal factors in Governor Franklin D. Roosevelt's final decision to build a hospital on this site in 1932.

Construction of the 200-bed facility was completed and it opened in 1936. In addition, the campus complex included residences for staff and physicians, an auditorium, greenhouse, power plant and laundry. A separate children's 50-bed ward was constructed and opened the following year. Over the course of the next 35 years, the tuberculosis hospital served patients who often spent several months recuperating. Preventative efforts and advances in the use of antibiotics impacted the spread of tuberculosis and resulted in the closing of the hospital by the state in 1971.

Livingston County acquired the site and bordering park lands for $1.00 in 1972, using the main hospital building as a skilled nursing facility until 2004 when it was determined that a more modern facility was required. The adjacent Center for Nursing and Rehabilitation was built to accommodate the growing needs of the area and the other buildings on the campus now house various county departments and agencies.

== Geography ==
According to the U.S. Census Bureau, the county has a total area of 640 square miles (1,700 km^{2}), of which 632 square miles (1,640 km^{2}) is land and 8.5 square miles (22 km^{2}) (1.3%) is water.

Livingston County is located in the Finger Lakes region, south of Rochester and east of Buffalo.

Letchworth State Park is partly in the western part of the county. The Genesee River flows northward through the county.

The Rochester and Southern Railroad (RSR) traverses the county from Greigsville south through Mount Morris to Dansville.

=== Adjacent counties ===
- Monroe County – north
- Ontario County – east
- Steuben County – southeast
- Allegany County – south
- Wyoming County – west
- Genesee County – northwest

=== Major highways ===
- Interstate 390
- U.S. Route 20
- U.S. Route 20A
- New York State Route 5
- New York State Route 15
- New York State Route 15A
- New York State Route 36
- New York State Route 39
- New York State Route 63
- New York State Route 65

== Government and politics ==
Livingston County is heavily Republican. 1964 was the only time in history that Livingston County voted for the Democratic presidential candidate. Aside from 1964, Livingston County has voted Republican in every presidential election since the Republican Party's founding in 1854. Livingston County also voted Whig in every presidential election from 1828 to 1852. Since Johnson's win in 1964, the closest that a Democratic presidential candidate has gotten to winning Livingston County was Bill Clinton in 1996, when he lost to Bob Dole by just 113 votes.

United States presidential election results for Livingston County, New York
| Year | Republican / Whig | | Democratic | | Third party(ies) | |
| Year | No. | % | No. | % | No. | % |
|---|---|---|---|---|---|---|
| 1836 | 2,643 | 58.15% | 1,902 | 41.85% | 0 | 0.00% |
| 1840 | 3,916 | 59.32% | 2,634 | 39.90% | 52 | 0.79% |
| 1844 | 3,773 | 56.38% | 2,709 | 40.48% | 210 | 3.14% |
| 1848 | 3,730 | 55.55% | 839 | 12.49% | 2,146 | 31.96% |
| 1852 | 4,096 | 54.91% | 3,055 | 40.95% | 309 | 4.14% |
| 1856 | 3,597 | 49.76% | 1,652 | 22.86% | 1,979 | 27.38% |
| 1860 | 5,178 | 58.85% | 3,621 | 41.15% | 0 | 0.00% |
| 1864 | 4,580 | 56.31% | 3,553 | 43.69% | 0 | 0.00% |
| 1868 | 4,823 | 58.19% | 3,465 | 41.81% | 0 | 0.00% |
| 1872 | 4,753 | 58.59% | 3,350 | 41.30% | 9 | 0.11% |
| 1876 | 5,267 | 55.21% | 4,244 | 44.49% | 29 | 0.30% |
| 1880 | 5,522 | 55.53% | 4,242 | 42.65% | 181 | 1.82% |
| 1884 | 5,191 | 53.39% | 4,039 | 41.54% | 493 | 5.07% |
| 1888 | 5,584 | 54.80% | 4,067 | 39.92% | 538 | 5.28% |
| 1892 | 4,886 | 52.13% | 3,672 | 39.18% | 815 | 8.70% |
| 1896 | 5,461 | 55.18% | 4,101 | 41.44% | 334 | 3.38% |
| 1900 | 5,608 | 56.72% | 3,877 | 39.21% | 402 | 4.07% |
| 1904 | 5,884 | 61.46% | 3,252 | 33.97% | 438 | 4.57% |
| 1908 | 5,700 | 59.74% | 3,567 | 37.38% | 275 | 2.88% |
| 1912 | 3,726 | 41.52% | 3,203 | 35.70% | 2,044 | 22.78% |
| 1916 | 5,211 | 57.66% | 3,608 | 39.92% | 219 | 2.42% |
| 1920 | 9,488 | 68.84% | 3,571 | 25.91% | 724 | 5.25% |
| 1924 | 10,472 | 69.56% | 3,676 | 24.42% | 907 | 6.02% |
| 1928 | 11,632 | 64.05% | 5,545 | 30.53% | 983 | 5.41% |
| 1932 | 11,114 | 62.13% | 6,529 | 36.50% | 245 | 1.37% |
| 1936 | 12,353 | 65.18% | 6,088 | 32.12% | 512 | 2.70% |
| 1940 | 12,629 | 66.18% | 6,397 | 33.52% | 58 | 0.30% |
| 1944 | 11,383 | 64.04% | 6,351 | 35.73% | 41 | 0.23% |
| 1948 | 11,310 | 62.62% | 6,409 | 35.48% | 343 | 1.90% |
| 1952 | 14,760 | 71.37% | 5,901 | 28.53% | 19 | 0.09% |
| 1956 | 15,523 | 75.68% | 4,989 | 24.32% | 0 | 0.00% |
| 1960 | 13,681 | 63.77% | 7,765 | 36.19% | 8 | 0.04% |
| 1964 | 7,120 | 34.53% | 13,481 | 65.38% | 18 | 0.09% |
| 1968 | 11,659 | 59.75% | 6,989 | 35.82% | 865 | 4.43% |
| 1972 | 15,886 | 69.13% | 7,031 | 30.60% | 63 | 0.27% |
| 1976 | 14,044 | 58.96% | 9,629 | 40.43% | 146 | 0.61% |
| 1980 | 11,193 | 49.85% | 9,030 | 40.22% | 2,231 | 9.94% |
| 1984 | 16,389 | 68.60% | 7,399 | 30.97% | 104 | 0.44% |
| 1988 | 14,004 | 59.10% | 9,506 | 40.11% | 187 | 0.79% |
| 1992 | 12,122 | 45.21% | 8,648 | 32.25% | 6,044 | 22.54% |
| 1996 | 10,981 | 43.68% | 10,868 | 43.23% | 3,289 | 13.08% |
| 2000 | 15,244 | 56.00% | 10,476 | 38.48% | 1,503 | 5.52% |
| 2004 | 17,729 | 59.20% | 11,504 | 38.41% | 715 | 2.39% |
| 2008 | 16,030 | 53.17% | 13,655 | 45.29% | 464 | 1.54% |
| 2012 | 14,448 | 53.97% | 11,705 | 43.72% | 617 | 2.30% |
| 2016 | 17,290 | 57.57% | 10,697 | 35.62% | 2,044 | 6.81% |
| 2020 | 18,182 | 57.90% | 12,477 | 39.73% | 742 | 2.36% |
| 2024 | 18,780 | 60.51% | 12,148 | 39.14% | 107 | 0.34% |

| Office | District | Area of the county | Officeholder | Party | First took office |
|---|---|---|---|---|---|
| Congressman | New York's 24th congressional district | All | Claudia Tenney | Republican | 2020 |
| State Senator | 54th State Senate District | All | Pam Helming | Republican | 2016 |
| State Assemblyman | 133rd State Assembly District | All | Andrea Bailey | Republican | 2025 |

Livingston County is governed by a 17–member legislature headed by a chairman. Livingston County is part of the 7th Judicial District of the New York Supreme Court and the 4th Division of the New York Supreme Court, Appellate Division.

== Demographics ==
Historical population
| Census | Pop. | Note | %± |
|---|---|---|---|
| 1830 | 27,729 | | — |
| 1840 | 35,140 | | 26.7% |
| 1850 | 40,875 | | 16.3% |
| 1860 | 39,546 | | −3.3% |
| 1870 | 39,309 | | −0.6% |
| 1880 | 39,562 | | 0.6% |
| 1890 | 37,801 | | −4.5% |
| 1900 | 37,059 | | −2.0% |
| 1910 | 38,037 | | 2.6% |
| 1920 | 36,830 | | −3.2% |
| 1930 | 37,560 | | 2.0% |
| 1940 | 38,510 | | 2.5% |
| 1950 | 40,257 | | 4.5% |
| 1960 | 44,053 | | 9.4% |
| 1970 | 54,041 | | 22.7% |
| 1980 | 57,006 | | 5.5% |
| 1990 | 62,372 | | 9.4% |
| 2000 | 64,328 | | 3.1% |
| 2010 | 65,393 | | 1.7% |
| 2020 | 61,834 | | −5.4% |
| 2025 (est.) | 61,438 | ▼ | −0.6% |
U.S. Decennial Census; 1790–1960 1900–1990; 1990–2000 2010–2020

=== 2020 census ===
Livingston County, New York – Racial and ethnic composition Note: the US Census treats Hispanic/Latino as an ethnic category. This table excludes Latinos from the racial categories and assigns them to a separate category. Hispanics/Latinos may be of any race.
| Race / Ethnicity (NH = Non-Hispanic) | Pop 1980 | Pop 1990 | Pop 2000 | Pop 2010 | Pop 2020 | % 1980 | % 1990 | % 2000 | % 2010 | % 2020 |
|---|---|---|---|---|---|---|---|---|---|---|
| White alone (NH) | 55,668 | 59,485 | 59,748 | 60,296 | 54,611 | 97.65% | 95.37% | 92.88% | 92.21% | 88.32% |
| Black or African American alone (NH) | 650 | 1,380 | 1,836 | 1,491 | 1,071 | 1.14% | 2.21% | 2.85% | 2.28% | 1.73% |
| Native American or Alaska Native alone (NH) | 132 | 178 | 157 | 158 | 125 | 0.23% | 0.29% | 0.24% | 0.24% | 0.20% |
| Asian alone (NH) | 145 | 322 | 489 | 780 | 653 | 0.25% | 0.52% | 0.76% | 1.19% | 1.06% |
| Native Hawaiian or Pacific Islander alone (NH) | x | x | 16 | 11 | 6 | x | x | 0.02% | 0.02% | 0.01% |
| Other race alone (NH) | 64 | 32 | 43 | 54 | 203 | 0.11% | 0.05% | 0.07% | 0.08% | 0.33% |
| Mixed race or Multiracial (NH) | x | x | 580 | 801 | 2,444 | x | x | 0.90% | 1.22% | 3.95% |
| Hispanic or Latino (any race) | 347 | 975 | 1,459 | 1,802 | 2,721 | 0.61% | 1.56% | 2.27% | 2.76% | 4.40% |
| Total | 57,006 | 62,372 | 64,328 | 65,393 | 61,834 | 100.00% | 100.00% | 100.00% | 100.00% | 100.00% |

=== 2010 Census ===
As of the 2010 Census, there were 65,393 people, 24,409 households, and 15,943 families residing in the county. The population density was 103.5 people per square mile (40.0 people/km^{2}). There were 27,123 housing units at an average density of 43 units per square mile (17/km^{2}).

The county's racial makeup was 93.8% White, 2.4% African American, 0.29% Native American, 1.2% Asian, 0.03% Pacific Islander, 0.76% from other races, and 1.4% from two or more races. Hispanic or Latino residents of any race were 2.76% of the population. In 2017, 26.3% were of German, 21.2% Irish, 14.2% Italian, 13.5% English and 5.6% American ancestry according to the 2017 American Community Survey. 93.5% spoke only English at home, while 2.6% spoke Spanish.

=== 2000 Census ===
As of the 2000 Census, there were 64,328 people, 22,150 households, and 15,349 families residing in the county. The population density was 102 people per square mile (39 people/km^{2}). There were 24,023 housing units at an average density of 38 units per square mile (15/km^{2}).

The county's racial makeup was 94% White, 3% African American, 0.27% Native American, 0.76% Asian, 0.03% Pacific Islander, 0.85% from other races, and 1.04% from two or more races. Hispanic or Latino residents of any race were 2.27% of the population. 22.5% were of German, 17.7% Irish, 14.3% Italian, 12.8% English and 7.0% American ancestry according to the 2000 Census. 95.8% spoke only English at home, while 2.0% spoke Spanish.

There were 22,150 households, of which 34% had children under the age of 18 living with them, 54.8% were married couples living together, 10% had a female householder with no husband present, and 30.7% were non-families. 23.1% of all households were made up of individuals, and 9.40% had someone living alone who was 65 years of age or older. The average household size was 2.6 and the average family size was 3.05.

23.40% of the county's population was under the age of 18, 14.20% were from age 18 to 24, 28.90% were from age 25 to 44, 22.10% were from age 45 to 64, and 11.40% were age 65 or older. The median age was 35 years. For every 100 females there were 100.70 males. For every 100 females age 18 and over, there were 99.00 males.

The county's median household income was $42,066, and the median family income was $50,513. Males had a median income of $36,599 versus $25,228 for females. The county's per capita income was $18,062. About 5.80% of families and 10.40% of the population were below the poverty line, including 9.70% of those under age 18 and 6.50% of those age 65 or over.

== Communities ==
=== Larger settlements ===
| # | Location | Population | Type | Area |
|---|---|---|---|---|
| 1 | †Geneseo | 8,031 | Village | Center |
| 2 | Dansville | 4,719 | Village | South |
| 3 | Avon | 3,394 | Village | North |
| 4 | Mount Morris | 2,986 | Village | Center |
| 5 | Conesus Lake | 2,584 | CDP | Lakeside |
| 6 | Caledonia | 2,201 | Village | North |
| 7 | Lima | 2,139 | Village | North |
| 8 | Livonia | 1,409 | Village | Lakeside |
| 9 | Nunda | 1,377 | Village | South |
| 10 | Lakeville | 756 | CDP | North |
| 11 | East Avon | 608 | CDP | North |
| 12 | Hemlock | 557 | CDP | Lakeside |
| 13 | Springwater | 549 | CDP | Lakeside |
| 14 | York | 544 | CDP | North |
| 15 | Leicester | 468 | Village | Center |
| 16 | Livonia Center | 421 | CDP | Lakeside |
| 17 | Dalton | 362 | CDP | South |
| 18 | Retsof | 340 | CDP | Center |
| 19 | Conesus | 308 | CDP | Lakeside |
| 20 | Cuylerville | 297 | CDP | Center |
| 21 | Groveland Station | 281 | CDP | Center |
| 22 | South Lima | 240 | CDP | North |
| 23 | Fowlerville | 227 | CDP | North |
| 24 | Piffard | 220 | CDP | Center |
| 25 | Greigsville | 209 | CDP | North |
| 26 | Wadsworth | 190 | CDP | Center |
| 27 | Cumminsville | 183 | CDP | South |
| 28 | Scottsburg | 117 | CDP | South |
| 29 | Kysorville | 110 | CDP | South |
| 30 | Woodsville | 80 | CDP | Lakeside |
| 31 | Hunt | 78 | CDP | South |
| 32 | Linwood | 74 | CDP | North |
| 33 | Tuscarora | 71 | CDP | Center |
| 34 | Websters Crossing | 69 | CDP | Lakeside |
| 35 | Byersville | 47 | CDP | South |

=== Towns ===
- Avon
- Caledonia
- Conesus
- Geneseo
- Groveland
- Leicester
- Lima
- Livonia
- Mount Morris
- North Dansville
- Nunda
- Ossian
- Portage
- Sparta
- Springwater
- West Sparta
- York

==== Villages ====
- Avon
- Caledonia
- Dansville
- Geneseo
- Leicester
- Lima
- Livonia
- Mount Morris
- Nunda

=== Hamlet ===
- Coopersville

== Education ==
School districts include:

- Avon Central School District
- Caledonia-Mumford Central School District
- Canaseraga Central School District
- Dalton-Nunda Central School District (Keshequa)
- Dansville Central School District
- Geneseo Central School District
- Honeoye Central School District
- Honeoye Falls-Lima Central School District
- Le Roy Central School District
- Livonia Central School District
- Mount Morris Central School District
- Naples Central School District
- Pavilion Central School District
- Perry Central School District
- Wayland-Cohocton Central School District
- Wheatland-Chili Central School District
- York Central School District

== Notable people ==
- Cornelia Wadsworth Ritchie Adair, published diarist and matriarch of Glenveagh Castle and JA Ranch, was born into the Wadsworth family of Geneseo.
- Lois Bryan Adams (1817–1870), writer, journalist, newspaper editor
- James C. Adamson, NASA astronaut, grew up in Geneseo.
- Chester A. Arthur, 21st President of the United States, was son of a Baptist minister and moved to York in 1837, attending the Old Brick School there. His infant brother, George, is buried at Pleasant Valley Cemetery in York.
- Harriet N. Austin, a water cure physician, dress reformer, and women's rights advocate, was associated for many years with the Jackson Sanitorium in North Dansville
- Cassius McDonald Barnes, American Civil War soldier, served as the 4th Governor of Oklahoma Territory; born in Livingston County.
- Ross Barnes, famous Major League Baseball player, was born at Mt. Morris, Livingston County, in 1850.
- Isabel Chapin Barrows, first woman employed by the United States State Department, worked for a time at the Jackson Sanitorium in Dansville and met her husband, Samuel June Barrows, there.
- Clara Barton, volunteer nurse during the Civil War, organized the first chapter of the American Red Cross at Dansville, Livingston County, in 1881.
- Francis Bellamy, author of the "Pledge of Allegiance", was born in the village of Mt. Morris in 1855 and lived there until 1859.
- James G. Birney, abolitionist and politician, is buried at Williamsburg Cemetery, Groveland.
- Sarah Hopkins Bradford, writer and historian, was born in Mt. Morris.
- Claude Fayette Bragdon, important architect, lived in Dansville for about four years beginning in 1877, where his father was a newspaper editor.
- William A. Brodie, Grand Master of Mason in New York, laid the foundation stone of the Statue of Liberty in 1884. He was Livingston County treasurer and spent most of his life in Geneseo.
- Charles R. Cameron, consul in Brazil, Chile, and Cuba, and consul-general in Japan, spent over forty years in the United States Foreign Service. He was born in York.
- Rev. Augusta Jane Chapin, born in Lakeville, Livonia, was the first woman in America to receive an honorary Doctor of Divinity degree.
- Emma Lampert Cooper, a prominent oil and watercolor artist, was born in Nunda.
- Cornplanter, Seneca war chief, diplomat, and veteran of the French and Indian War and the American Revolutionary War, was born at Canawaugus, now part of Caledonia.
- Millard Fillmore, 13th President of the United States, apprenticed for four months as a teenager at a wool-carding and cloth-dressing mill in West Sparta.
- Clinton Bowen Fisk, American Civil War brigadier general, banker, 1888 US presidential candidate for the Prohibition Party, and person whom Fisk University is named; born in York.
- James W. Gerard, American Ambassador to Germany, was born at Geneseo.
- Walter E. Gregory (1857–1918), physician; first chairman of the Southern Livingston County chapter of the American Red Cross
- Seth Green, the "Father of Fish Culture", established the first North American fish hatchery at Caledonia in 1864; it is now also the oldest in the country.
- Handsome Lake, a Seneca religious leader, was born at Canawaugus, now part of Caledonia
- Vivika Heino, noted ceramicist, was born in Caledonia
- Eben Norton Horsford, scientist and inventor, developed a new formula for baking powder, eventually producing Rumford Baking Powder. He was born in Leicester.
- William H. C. Hosmer, poet, was native of Avon.
- Mary Seymour Howell, native of Mt. Morris, was an educator and fought for woman suffrage. She was a colleague of Susan B. Anthony and wrote the equal suffrage bill for the New York State Assembly, passed in 1892.
- Washington Hunt, United States Congressman, New York State Comptroller, and New York State Governor from 1851 to 1852, lived in Portage as a boy and was educated at the Geneseo Academy.
- Helen Hunt Jackson, a writer and advocate for western Native American groups, married into the Hunt family of Portage
- Mary Jemison, the "White Woman of the Genesee", taken captive by Native Americans, lived much of her life among the Seneca at Little Beard's Town, near present-day Cuylerville. After 1797, she resided on her 18,000-acre reservation, today part of Letchworth State Park.
- Tom Keene / George Duryea, American actor, was likely native of Oakland in the town of Portage
- Belva Ann Lockwood, women's rights activist, educator, and politician, was educated at Genesee Wesleyan Seminary.
- Sara Jane McBride, entomologist and early woman fly tyer, was born in Mumford and lived in Caledonia.
- Elizabeth Smith Miller, women's suffrage advocate and dress reformer, was born at Groveland and designed the "Bloomer Outfit", popularized by Amelia Bloomer.
- Annetta Thompson Mills, born in Portage, founded the first formal school for the Deaf in China.
- Henry Granger Piffard (1842–1910), New York dermatologist and author of the first systematic treatise on dermatology in America
- Henry Jarvis Raymond, United States Congressmen and founder of the New York Times, was from Lima and attended the Genesee Wesleyan Seminary there.
- Jessie Belle Rittenhouse, American poet and critic, was born at Mt. Morris, and received the first Robert Frost Medal from the Poetry Society of America in 1930.
- Anne Graham Rockfellow, architect, was born in Mt. Morris and was the first woman to graduate from MIT with a degree in architecture in 1887.
- John Samuel Rowell (1825–1907), agricultural inventor and manufacturing industrialist, was a resident of Springwater
- Emily Maria Scott (1832–1915), artist and founder of the New York Water Color Club, was born in Springwater
- Daniel Shays, Revolutionary War soldier and leader of Shays' Rebellion, is buried in Scottsburg Union Cemetery in Conesus.
- Curt Smith, author and political speechwriter, was born in Caledonia and graduated from SUNY Geneseo in 1973.
- Annie D. Fraser Tallent, pioneer, was the first white woman to enter the territory of the Lakota people in South Dakota in 1874. She was originally from York.
- Alice Hay Wadsworth, national anti-suffrage leader, was wife of Senator James W. Wadsworth Jr. and was president of the National Association Opposed to Woman Suffrage from 1917 to 1920.
- James Wadsworth, pioneer, land speculator, and education advocate, settled the Geneseo area and later helped to fund New York State common school libraries. His brother William also was a pioneer and officer in the War of 1812.
- James Jeremiah Wadsworth, American politician and diplomat, was native of Geneseo.
- James S. Wadsworth, American Civil War general who was killed at the Battle of the Wilderness, had his hometown in Geneseo.
- Ferdinand Ward, American swindler, was a native of Geneseo.
- Henry I. Weed, Wisconsin state senator and lawyer, was born in Livingston County.
- Julia Ann Wilbur (1815–1895) resided on the northern edge of Avon and was an abolitionist and suffragist
- Frances E. Willard, suffrage and temperance leader, began an early career of teaching at Lima's Genesee Wesleyan Seminary before becoming the national president of the Woman's Christian Temperance Union (WCTU) and influencing the passage of the 19th Amendment.
- John Young, New York State Governor, was born in Conesus and opened a law office in Geneseo before embarking on his state and federal legislative career.

== See also ==
- Livingston County Courthouse (New York)
- List of counties in New York
- List of New York State Historic Markers in Livingston County, New York
- National Register of Historic Places listings in Livingston County, New York
