= Linwood, New York =

- Census-designated place
- Location within New York Location within the United States
- Coordinates: 42°53′41″N 77°56′57″W
- Country: United States
- State: New York
- County: Livingston
- Town: York

Area
  - Total: 0.93 sq mi (2.41 km^{2})
  - Land: 0.93 sq mi (2.41 km^{2})
  - Water: 0 sq mi (0.00 km^{2})
- Elevation: 938 ft (286 m)

Population (2020)
  - Total: 84
  - Density: 90.5/sq mi (34.93/km^{2})
- Time zone: UTC-5 (Eastern (EST))
  - Summer (DST): UTC-4 (EDT)
- ZIP code: 14486
- Area code: 585
- GNIS feature ID: 955426

Linwood is a hamlet and census-designated place (CDP) in the town of York, Livingston County, New York, United States. As of the 2020 census, Linwood had a population of 84. Linwood had a post office until February 6, 1993; it still has its own ZIP code, 14486.

== Geography ==
Linwood is in northwestern Livingston County, in the northwest corner of the town of York. It is bordered to the north and west by the town of Pavilion in Genesee County. U.S. Route 20 passes 1 mile (1.6 km) north of the community. Rochester is 30 miles (48 km) northeast of Linwood, Batavia is 15 miles (24 km) to the northwest, and Geneseo, the Livingston county seat, is 11 miles (18 km) to the southeast.

According to the U.S. Census Bureau, the Linwood CDP has an area of 0.93 square miles (2.41 km^{2}), all land. The Linwood area drains toward Browns Creek, an east-flowing tributary of the Genesee River.

== Demographics ==
Historical population
Census	Pop.	Note	%±
2020	84		—
U.S. Decennial Census
