= York, New York =

- Town
- Location within New York Location within the United States
- Coordinates: 42°51′32″N 77°53′25″W
- Country: United States
- State: New York
- County: Livingston

Government
  - Type: Town Council
  - Town Supervisor: Gerald L. Deming (D, R)
  - Town Council: Members' List: • Lynn M. Parnell (D, R); • Norman R. Gates (D, R); • Frank Rose, Jr. (D, R); • David S. Deuel (D, R)

Area
  - Total: 49.11 sq mi (127.19 km^{2})
  - Land: 49.10 sq mi (127.17 km^{2})
  - Water: 0.0077 sq mi (0.02 km^{2}) 0%
- Elevation: 768 ft (234 m)

Population (2020)
  - Total: 3,182
  - Density: 67.2/sq mi (25.96/km^{2})
- Time zone: UTC-5 (Eastern (EST))
  - Summer (DST): UTC-4 (EDT)
- ZIP Codes: 14592 (York); 14533 (Piffard); 14539 (Retsof); 14486 (Linwood); 14525 (Pavilion); 14482 (Le Roy); 14423 (Caledonia)
- Area code: 585
- FIPS code: 36-051-84022
- GNIS feature ID: 0979661
- Website: www.yorkny.gov

York is a town in western Livingston County, New York, United States. Its population was 3,182 at the 2020 census.

The Abbey of the Genesee in the town's hamlet of Piffard is locally famous due to the production of Monks' Bread.

== History ==
In 1722, the Tuscarora people moved north to join other Iroquoian natives, the League of the Iroquois, and settled near modern Piffard. The town was first settled by Europeans around 1800.

The town was formed in 1819 from parts of the towns of Leicester and Caledonia before the establishment of Livingston County. More territory was added from the town of Covington in 1823.

Salt was found in 1883 near modern Retsof, leading to the formation of the New York Rock Salt Company. Further discoveries were made subsequently by the Empire Salt Company and American Rock Salt.

The Linwood Gardens estate was added to the National Register of Historic Places in 1997.

== Notable people ==
- Chester A. Arthur, US president, lived in York Centre as a child
- Charles Cameron, American diplomat, born in York
- Nassos Daphnis, Greek American artist and horticulturist, visited York every year between the 1940s-1980s to hybridize tree peonies at the Linwood Gardens estate
- Moses Hayden, US congressman
- John Chandler Holloway, Wisconsin State Assemblyman and state senator
- James Laird, former US congressman from Nebraska; born in Fowlerville
- Joseph Marron, optical engineer
- Donald Stewart, former Wisconsin State Assemblyman
- Annie Fraser Tallent, a writer and white pioneer of the Midwest, was born in York
- Catherine Young, a politician and former state senator

== Geography ==
According to the United States Census Bureau, the town has a total area of 49.1 square miles (127.2 km^{2}), of which 0.01 square miles (0.02 km^{2}), or 0.02%, are water.

The west town line borders Genesee and Wyoming Counties.

New York State Route 36 (north-south) intersects New York State Route 63 (east-west) at Greigsville. U.S. Route 20 passes along the northern town line.

=== Adjacent towns and areas ===
(Clockwise)

- Caledonia
- Avon; Geneseo
- Leicester
- Covington; Pavilion

== Demographics ==
Historical population
Census	Pop.	Note	%±
1820	1,729		—
1830	2,636		52.5%
1840	3,049		15.7%
1850	2,785		−8.7%
1860	2,743		−1.5%
1870	2,564		−6.5%
1880	2,482		−3.2%
1890	2,868		15.6%
1900	2,730		−4.8%
1910	2,562		−6.2%
1920	2,640		3.0%
1930	2,349		−11.0%
1940	2,287		−2.6%
1950	2,329		1.8%
1960	2,695		15.7%
1970	3,166		17.5%
1980	3,212		1.5%
1990	3,513		9.4%
2000	3,219		−8.4%
2010	3,397		5.5%
2020	3,182		−6.3%
U.S. Decennial Census

As of the census of 2000, there were 3,219 people, 1,181 households, and 881 families residing in the town. The population density was 65.6 inhabitants per square mile (25.3/km^{2}). There were 1,231 housing units at an average density of 25.1 per square mile (9.7/km^{2}). The racial makeup of the town was 97.42% White, 1.06% African American, 0.09% Native American, 0.56% Asian, and 0.87% from two or more races. Hispanic or Latino of any race were 0.84% of the population.

There were 1,181 households, out of which 35.0% had children under the age of 18 living with them, 62.2% were married couples living together, 8.4% had a female householder with no husband present, and 25.4% were non-families. 21.3% of all households were made up of individuals, and 9.5% had someone living alone who was 65 years of age or older. The average household size was 2.69 and the average family size was 3.12.

In the town, the population was spread out, with 26.7% under the age of 18, 6.6% from 18 to 24, 30.6% from 25 to 44, 24.8% from 45 to 64, and 11.4% who were 65 years of age or older. The median age was 38 years. For every 100 females, there were 102.6 males. For every 100 females age 18 and over, there were 98.6 males.

The median income for a household in the town was $43,229, and the median income for a family was $50,136. Males had a median income of $34,048 versus $20,430 for females. The per capita income for the town was $19,796. About 1.2% of families and 1.8% of the population were below the poverty line, including none of those under age 18 and 4.4% of those age 65 or over.

== Communities and locations in the Town of York ==
- Abbey of the Genesee – A monastery north of Piffard.
- Allens Corners – A location near the west town line.
- Bows Corners – A location southwest of York hamlet.
- Craigs – A hamlet in the western part of the town, west of York hamlet.
- Fowlerville – A hamlet and census-designated place in the northeast part of the town of York. The name comes from Wells Fowler, an early settler.
- Fraser – A hamlet near the north town line on US-20.
- Greigsville – A hamlet and census-designated place on Routes NY-36 and NY-63.
- Greigsville Station – A location south of Greigsville.
- Inverness – A location in the northwest part of the town, west of Fowlerville.
- Linwood – A hamlet and census-designated place along the west town line.
- McMillans Corners – A location west of York hamlet.
- Piffard (formerly Piffardinia) – A hamlet and census-designated place on NY-63, north of Geneseo. The name is from early settler David Piffard. Westerly, a historic home, was added to the National Register of Historic Places in 1974.
- Retsof – A hamlet and census-designated place south of the center of the town. Retsof was named for William Foster, Jr., 1885 president of the Empire Salt Co., spelled backwards.
- Retsof Corners – A location south of Retsof on NY-63.
- Rippeys Corners – A location east of Wadsworth.
- Roots Corners – A location south of York hamlet.
- The Forks – A location south of York hamlet.
- Toggletown – A hamlet at the north town line.
- Tryons Corners – A location in the southwest part of the town.
- Wadsworth – A hamlet and census-designated place near the south town line on NY-36.
- Walkers Corners – A location southwest of York hamlet.
- York – A hamlet and census-designated place, also known as York Hamlet, in the central part of the town on NY-36.
