= Avon High School (New York) =

Location
- 245 Clinton St; Avon, New York 14414; United States
- Coordinates: 42.9053°N 77.7379°W

Information
- Type: Public
- School district: Avon Central School District
- Superintendent: Ryan Pacatte
- NCES School ID: 360366000119
- Principal: Ryan Wagner
- Teaching staff: 30.00 (on an FTE basis)
- Grades: 9-12
- Gender: Co-ed
- Enrollment: 314 (2023-2024)
- Student to teacher ratio: 10.47
- Campus: Rural: Fringe
- Colors: Forest Green and White
- Mascot: River Hawks
- Yearbook: Avalon
- Website: www.avoncsd.org/66481_3

Avon High School is a public high school located in Avon, Livingston County, New York. It is the only high school operated by the Avon Central School District.

== History ==
In 2001 Timothy Hayes became principal at Avon High School. In 2002 he took the principal position at Geneseo Middle/High School.

Up to 2002 the school's education program about illegal drugs focused on getting students to not take them. In 2002 the school added a program in which the effects of said drugs are highlighted after a student died in 2001 from an overdose.
