= Avon Central School District =

School district in Livingston County, New York, United States

Location
- 191 Clinton St Avon, New York, 14414

District information
- Type: District
- Grades: PreK–12
- Schools: 3

Students and staff
- Students: 950
- Student–teacher ratio: 10:1

Other information
- Website: www.avoncsd.org

Avon Central School District is a school district headquartered in the town of Avon, New York.

It includes portions of Livingston and Monroe counties, including portions of the towns of Avon, Caledonia, Lima, and York in the former and Rush in the latter. Within Livingston County, the district includes the Village of Avon and the East Avon census-designated place.

== History ==
Avon's school districts were formed in 1812, when the state of New York divided counties and towns into districts. Fire destroyed the schoolhouse of South Avon School District 1 in 1895, and East Avon's school (East Avon district 3) was closed in 1942 due to consolidation.

=== 1945–1960 ===
Parents in Avon Central School District, formed by 1945, celebrated Principal Alvin Dunbar and the teaching staff at a community night in 1946. By the 1945–1946 school year, citizens approved the budget of the Avon Central School District at $114,979. In October 1947, the property tax rate was increased by $3.07 per $1000 of assessed value, to a total of $12.16 per $1000 of assessed value, "owing to higher teachers' salaries".

In April 1949, the District auctioned 24 property lots on Main Street, comprising approximately eight acres of land east of the Central School property. An additional tract of more than 30 acres was not auctioned, "for years if and when the agricultural department of the school might need it". In July 1949, Avon Central School District (the towns of Avon, Lima and Rush), adopted an estimated budget of $224,092.70. The District authorized $8,055 for the purchase of a school bus, and $2000 for a vehicle to be used in the driver's education program. Also in 1949, the Canawaugus District 5 of the town of Caledonia became part of the Avon Central School District.

Voters in the towns of Rush (Monroe County) and Avon, Caledonia, and Lima (Livingston County) rejected a $30,000 preliminary planning proposal in 1951 for building improvements, as well as new high school and junior high school plans, and a new central school building and bus garage. Of 522 votes cast, 402 opposed the planning proposal cost. In another vote in 1955, voters turned down a proposal to appropriate $1.7 million for a new building.

In 1956, there was a controversy in the district's residents over whether a school should be rebuilt. The proposal was to rebuild the district's secondary school. By April 28, 1956, there were three referendums over the issue. The referendum on March 10 resulted in 648 votes against and 502 votes for. The Avon School District's Board of Education did adopt a new salary schedule for teachers, coaches, and administrators, ranging from $3700–$5400 annually.

Voters narrowly approved two proposals for school construction in 1957, including "construction and equipment of a new junior-senior high school at a cost not to exceed $1,300,000", and "construction and equipment of a new auditorium in conjunction with the new school, at a cost not to exceed $140,000". In September 1957, the rate increased $4.97 over the $20.80 of the previous year, to $25.77 on each $1,000 of assessed property valuation. The following July, on a budget proposal of $531,953 for 1958–1959, passed by a vote of 48 to 1. The budget increased $100,477.63 over the previous year, due to construction of the new $1,400,000 school building. In July 1959, the proposed budget for 1959–1960 passed unanimously, providing funding for the new building construction and two new busses, as well as debt service and teacher salaries.

=== 1960–1995 ===
Voters approved the budget for 1960–1961 of $592,090, which was $24,124 higher than the previous year; the approved budget for 1961–1962 increased to $628,400.

A fire caused by faulty wiring destroyed the Avon Elementary School at the end of October 1961, and 480 pupils were evacuated safely within a minute and a half from the time the fire started. The main building destroyed had been built in 1907, and the addition containing the gym and auditorium built in 1927 was also destroyed. By October 17, the State Education Department authorized state funding toward the cost of rebuilding, which was combined with $400,000 insurance funding received from the fire to reduce the rebuilding cost to taxpayers. In January 1963, voters approved the spending $763,000 to build "nine classrooms, a cafeteria, gymnasium, administration office and bus garage as an addition to Avon Elementary School", with $423,000 to come from insurance funds from fire loss, and the remaining $340,000 from the sale of bonds.

In the 1980's, the budget had increased to millions: voters eventually approved the District's 1984–1985 budget of more than $5.1 million. In June 1987, the District's board and the district's 70 teachers were "deeply at odds over pay and other parts of a labor contract". By August, the District decided to buy out the superintendent, whom teachers perceived as "a major stumbling block during contract negotiations".

In 1995, the District and the teachers' union had not agreed on a salary and benefits contract, so both groups circulated media among the district's voters and the public to sway them to their respective sides. The contract dispute was settled in October 1995 through binding arbitration, "after after both sides had exhausted all negotiation efforts".

=== 1996–2025 ===
In 1998, voters approved a $10.9 million budget, increasing taxes about 3 percent.

The Livingston County Board of Supervisors proposed cuts to the 1999 Avon Central School District's share of the county sales tax income, which meant the District needed to "make up more than $300,000 a year, either with higher property taxes or by making cuts of its own".

Nevertheless, the District broke ground on its $14.9 million improvement project, which had been approved by voters in 1998. Improvements were described as "a new 10- classroom wing at the juniorsenior high school, seven more classrooms in the primary school, and an expanded library and renovated cafeteria at the middle school".

== District schools ==
School enrollments as of 2024 included:

- Avon Primary School, serving 330 students, pre-kindergarten — grade 4
- Avon Middle School, serving 271 students, grades 5 — 8
- Avon High School, serving 314 students, grades 9 —12

== Administration ==
Avon Central School District's administration oversees the district's operations and educational programs, distributes state resources, and monitors student achievement. Administrators include the superintendent, business administrator, director of academic programming, director of digital systems, high school principal, and director of building and grounds. The administration collaborates with the Board of Education to develop and implement district-wide goals and strategies.

=== Board of education ===
The Board of education is the elected governing body that sets policies and provides oversight for the district:

"The district's has five elected members... responsibilities include: "establishing policy for the operation of schools; adopting curriculum; securing money for operational needs and programs; authorizing expenditures; determining goals and standards; interpreting the educational needs of the community; and representing the views of the community in matters affecting education."

=== Finances ===
U.S. News & World Report published this description of the District's finances: "Avon Central School District spends $18,046 per student each year. It has an annual revenue of $21,807,000. Overall, the district spends $10,726.3 million on instruction, $6,754.4 million on support services and $359.0 million on other expenses.

In 2024, an audit by the New York State Comptroller was critical of the district's finances. The district administration responded to the report by stating it would reconsider how it uses its money, and the district administration announced that it would change the way money was spent.

== See also ==
- List of school districts in New York
