= Livingston County Courthouse =

Livingston County Courthouse may refer to:

- Livingston County Courthouse (Pontiac, Illinois), built in 1874 and listed on the National Register of Historic Places (NRHP)
- Livingston County Courthouse (Kentucky)
- Old Livingston County Courthouse (Kentucky), on the National Register of Historic Places listings in Livingston County, Kentucky
- Livingston County Courthouse (Geneseo, New York), an 1898-designed courthouse
- Livingston County Courthouse (Michigan), a listing on National Register of Historic Places in Livingston County, Michigan
