= Donald Stewart (Wisconsin politician) =

American politician

Donald Stewart was a member of the Wisconsin State Assembly during the 1882 and 1883 sessions. He was a Republican. Stewart was born on June 5, 1825, in York, New York.
