= Livingston County Courthouse (New York) =

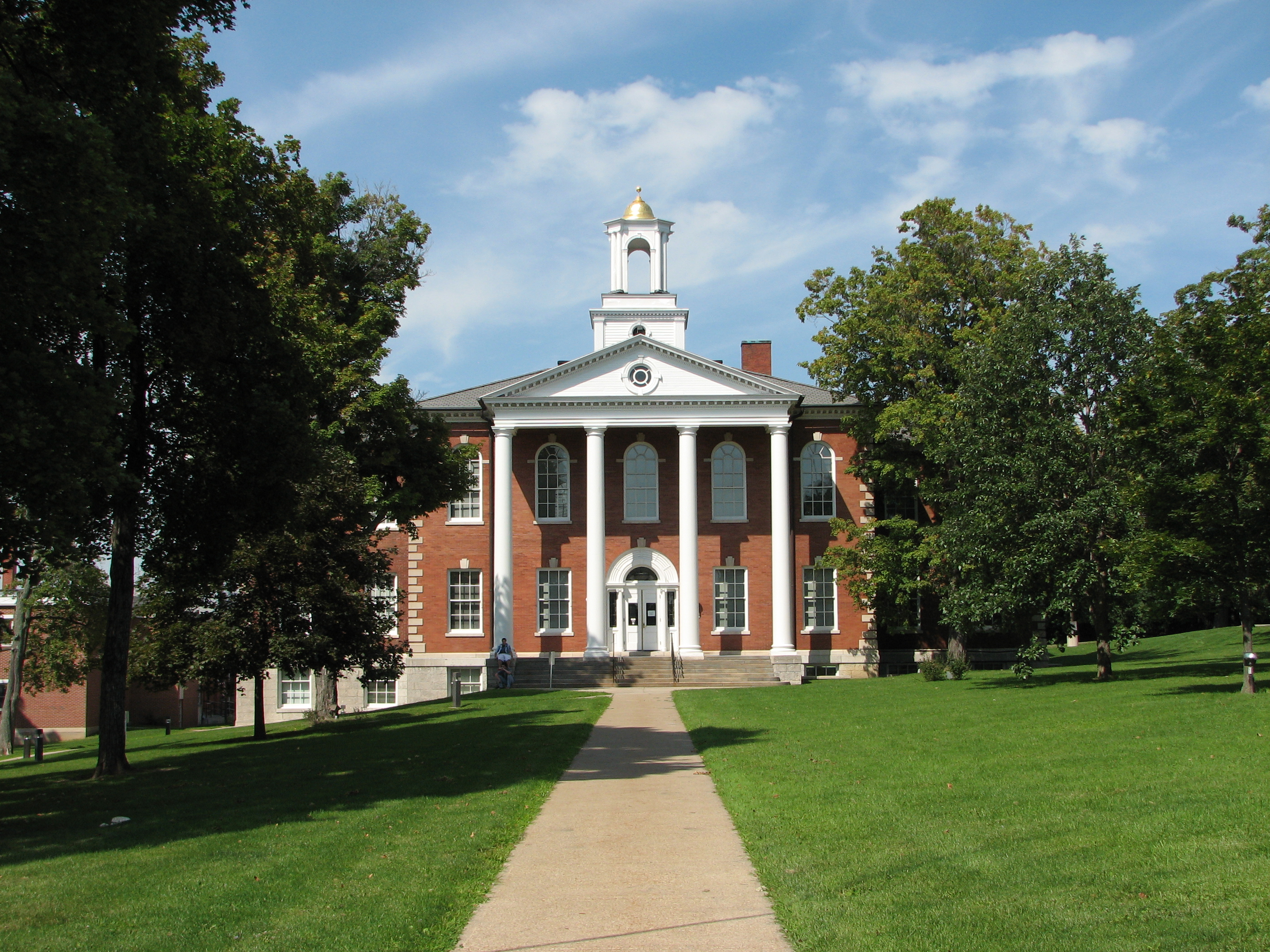
- Livingston County Courthouse (2007)
- Interactive map of the Livingston County Courthouse area

General information
- Location: Geneseo, New York, USA, 2 Court Street
- Coordinates: 42°48′3″N 077°48′57″W

Design and construction
- Architecture firm: Bragdon & Hillman

Livingston County Courthouse in Livingston County, New York is a building in Geneseo, New York, USA, located on 2 Court Street. The court house was designed in 1898 by the Rochester architectural firm of Bragdon & Hillman, which included architects Claude Fayette Bragdon and J. Con. Hillman. Their work on the court house was featured in exhibitions published by architectural organizations.

In 2000 the Livingston County Board of Supervisors approved US$77,000 in renovations for the courthouse, which included exterior painting work and security improvement. Judge Ronald Cicoria, who retired in 2005 as the longest sitting judge in New York State, was originally inspired to study the practice of law while walking past the courthouse on his way to class at the State University of New York at Geneseo.

In 2001 a fund campaign began to build a statue of James S. Wadsworth on the grounds of the courthouse, modeled after the bronze statue of Wadsworth at Gettysburg National Military Park in Gettysburg, Pennsylvania. In February 2002, the Livingston County Board of Supervisors agreed to allow the statue to be built on the front lawn of the courthouse. The fund raising campaign had its inaugural event on April 5, 2002, with a speech at the State University of New York at Geneseo by Pulitzer Prize winner and Civil War historian James M. McPherson.

== Building history ==
Work on the Courthouse was completed in 1901 to designs by the Rochester architectural firm of Bragdon & Hillman, which included architects Claude Fayette Bragdon and J. Con. Hillman. The architects designed the building in 1898. Writing in Rochester History published by the Rochester Public Library, Erville Costa comments: "The Livingston County Courthouse, which they built in 1898, reflects Bragdon's conviction at the time that colonial architecture was a more honest expression of a truly national spirit than either the eclectic or Richardsonian architecture which dominated the scene."

The "Decorative Scheme for the Court Room" and floor plans of the new courthouse were featured in the Catalogue of the Thirteenth Annual Exhibition of the Architectural League of New York, by the Architectural League of New York, published in 1898. The entrance to the courthouse was featured in the Catalogue of the Fourteenth Annual Exhibition of the Architectural League of New York, published in 1899, and in the 1899 Catalogue of the Annual Exhibition of the Saint Louis Architectural Club.

In 2000, the Livingston County Board of Supervisors approved $77,000 in renovations for the courthouse. This included $64,800 for exterior painting work on the building, and $13,100 for a metal detector unit to be installed at the front entrance of the building.

=== Wadsworth statue campaign ===
In 2001, a campaign began to raise $100,000 to build a statue of James S. Wadsworth on the courthouse grounds. Wadsworth was a general in the American Civil War and a native of Geneseo. The statue was intended to be a 9-foot replica of the bronze statue of Wadsworth built in 1914 on the battlefield at Gettysburg National Military Park in Gettysburg, Pennsylvania. In February 2002 the Livingston County Board of Supervisors agreed to allow the statue to be built in front of the courthouse, at the northern end of Main Street. "It seems like it's in line with the historic nature of the courthouse and the history of the region," said County Administrator Nick Mazza in a statement in the Rochester Democrat and Chronicle. The fund raising campaign was launched with an inaugural event April 5, 2002 with a speech on civil war history given at the Wadsworth Auditorium at the State University of New York at Geneseo by Pulitzer Prize winner and civil war historian James M. McPherson. The statue campaign was headed by Judith Hunter, a research scholar at the State University of New York at Geneseo.

== Livingston County Court ==
Judge Gerard Alonzo served as a Livingston County Court judge from 1996 to 2005, and Judge J. Robert Houston served from 1973 to 1993. Judge Ronald Cicoria served at Livingston County Court in 1999. Cicoria was first inspired to study law while passing by the courthouse on his way to class at the State University of New York at Geneseo. After thirty years of service, Cicoria retired in 2005 – at the time he was the longest sitting judge in New York State, as well as the longest sitting judge in the history of Livingston County.

In 2002 the Livingston County District Attorney was Thomas Moran. Thomas VanStrydonck served as a State Supreme Court Justice and gave decisions at the courthouse in 2006. In 2009 Diane C. Murphy was the Chief Clerk of the court.

== See also ==
- Geneseo Historic District
- Robert Livingston (1746–1813)
