= Abbey of the Genesee =

American Trappist Monastery

Coordinates: 42.844184°N 77.864281°W

- Interactive map of Abbey of the Genesee

Monastery information
- Full name: Our Lady of the Genesee Abbey
- Order: Trappists
- Established: May 26, 1951
- Mother house: Gethsemani Abbey
- Diocese: Diocese of Rochester

People
- Founders: Gerard McGinley, O.C.S.O.
- Abbot: Gerard D'Souza, O.C.S.O.

Site
- Location: 3258 River Road, Piffard, New York
- Country: United States
- Website: geneseeabbey.org

The Abbey of the Genesee is a community of more than two dozen contemplative monks located near Piffard in the town of York, New York. They are a member of the Order of Cistercians of the Strict Observance, commonly known as the Trappists. They were founded from the Abbey of Gethsemani in Bardstown, Kentucky in 1951. The Abbey of the Genesee is well known for its production of "Monks' Bread" which is baked by the monks and sold commercially, providing an income stream to support the monastic community.

== Monks' Bread ==
A significant part of the monks' labor includes baking a brand of bread called Monks' Bread which is sold at the Abbey store and distributed to regional supermarkets. The sale of the bread helps support the abbey and its inhabitants. The bread was originally made by one of the monks, Brother Sylvester, for the monastic community and its guests. Over time, demand for loaves from outsiders gradually led to the development of the current commercial operation.

The bread is baked several times each week in the early hours of the morning. For that reason the monks go to bed around seven at night in order to rise about two in the morning. For reasons of security and hygiene, it is not possible to observe the baking process except through slides and photographs.

Several varieties of bread are baked, including white, whole wheat, rye, and raisin, along with a number of other products such as gourmet coffee, jams and fruitcakes.

== Visitors ==
The abbey chapel is open from 3:30 am to 7:30 pm. The abbey store is open from 10:00am to 4:00pm on certain days. Casual visitors are able to enter only a restricted part of the abbey. The abbey is open to serious individual guests and small groups who wish to make a retreat and avail themselves of the counseling of the monks. A small fee is charged to cover expenses.

== Literature ==
In 1974, the Dutch priest and writer Henri Nouwen was allowed to live with the community of monks as a temporary member for seven months. This is rather unusual, because while the Trappists do accept retreatants for some days, it is usually not possible to become a "temporary monk" as Nouwen did. The permission was granted particularly due to Nouwen's close friendship with Abbot John Eudes.

After his retreat, Nouwen's diary was published in 1976 under the title The Genesee Diary - Report from a Trappist Monastery. This book is now deemed one of the fundamental works about Trappist spirituality and contemplative life in general. It is also widely recommended to be read by prospective monks during their vocational discernment.
