= Geneseo Middle/High School =

Location
- 4050 Avon Rd; Geneseo, New York 14454; United States; 42.8123°N 77.8087°W

Information
- Type: Public
- School district: Geneseo Central School District
- NCES School ID: 361194000961
- Principal: Head Principal: Craig Veley, Vice Principal: Megan Curley
- Teaching staff: 51.72 (on an FTE basis)
- Grades: 6-12
- Gender: Co-ed
- Enrollment: 449 (2023-2024)
- Student to teacher ratio: 8.68
- Campus: Rural: Fringe
- Colors: Blue and White
- Mascot: Blue Devils
- Rival: York
- Yearbook: Jen-O-See
- Website: www.geneseocsd.org/o/gmhs

Geneseo Middle/High School is a public high school in Geneseo, New York. It is a part of the Geneseo Central School District.

== History ==
In 2002, Timothy Hayes became the principal, leaving his principal position at Avon High School.
