= Joseph Marron =

Joseph Charles Marron (born 1959) is an American optical engineer and a principal engineering fellow at Raytheon. He is known for his work in developing advanced laser radar and the invention of holographic laser radar. He is a fellow of the Optical Society of America and in June 2018 was awarded the 10 millionth U.S. patent.

Marron was educated at University of Rochester's Institute of Optics. He received his undergraduate degree in 1981 and his PhD in 1986. While working at the Environmental Research Institute of Michigan (ERIM) he was issued his first patent in 1991.

While at ERIM Marron was part of NASA's Hubble Aberration Recovery Project (HARP) team that "fixed" the Hubble Space Telescope through the installation of the Corrective Optics Space Telescope Axial Replacement (COSTAR) instrument. His was one of the groups that calculated the error in the mirror from the faulty images using phase retrieval, allowing the corrective optics to be designed.

in 1993, still at ERIM, Marron developed a method for holographic laser radar imaging. In 2004, while at Corning, he was elected a Fellow of the Optical Society of America for "contributions to the science of coherent imaging and the invention of holographic laser radar." Marron also worked for Lockheed Martin and later became a principle research fellow at Raytheon Space and Airborne Systems.

On June 19, 2018, Marron was granted patent number 10,000,000 titled "Coherent LADAR Using Intra-Pixel Quadrature Detection" It is for a system to improve laser detection and ranging (LADAR). The patent was also the first to receive the USPTO's redesigned patent cover, specifically unveiled in conjunction with the milestone event. President Donald Trump signed the patent during a special ceremony at the White House. Marron was joined at the event by Secretary of Commerce, Wilbur Ross, USPTO Director Andrei Iancu, and Raytheon CEO Thomas Kennedy. The patent has been assigned to Raytheon.
