= Piffard, New York =

- Census-designated place
- Location within New York Location within the United States
- Coordinates: 42°49′42″N 77°51′03″W
- Country: United States
- State: New York
- County: Livingston
- Town: York

Area
  - Total: 0.93 sq mi (2.42 km^{2})
  - Land: 0.93 sq mi (2.42 km^{2})
  - Water: 0 sq mi (0.00 km^{2})
- Elevation: 568 ft (173 m)

Population (2020)
  - Total: 208
  - Density: 222.8/sq mi (86.01/km^{2})
- Time zone: UTC-5 (Eastern (EST))
  - Summer (DST): UTC-4 (EDT)
- ZIP Code: 14533
- Area code: 585
- GNIS feature ID: 960368
- FIPS code: 36-57804

Piffard is a census-designated place (CDP) and hamlet in the town of York, Livingston County, New York, United States. As of the 2020 census, Piffard had a population of 208. The ZIP Code is 14533.

== History ==
Piffard takes its name from David Piffard, an English-born landowner who settled in the Genesee Valley in 1824 and acquired roughly 600 acres in what is now the town of York. Late nineteenth-century county histories state that part of this land later became the settlement that bore his name.

In the nineteenth century, Piffard developed along an important transportation corridor. The route of the Genesee Valley Canal passed through the area, and canal-era development helped shape the hamlet’s early growth and local commercial life. Regional historical sources connect Piffard to the canal’s southward construction in the late 1830s and to later canal-related activity in the hamlet.

Piffard also contains notable historic architecture. Westerly, built in 1850, is a brick house combining Greek Revival and early Italianate design elements. It was associated with Major William H. Spencer and was later owned by the Wadsworth family. The house was listed on the National Register of Historic Places in 1974.

Just north of the hamlet is the Abbey of the Genesee, a Trappist monastery founded in 1951. Although outside the historic nineteenth-century development of Piffard itself, the abbey became one of the best-known institutions in the immediate area.

== Geography ==
Piffard is in northwestern Livingston County, in the southeast part of the town of York. It is bordered to the west by the Hamlet of Retsof. New York State Route 63 passes through the Piffard, leading southeast 3 miles (5 km) to Geneseo, the Livingston county seat, and northwest 22 miles (35 km) to Batavia.

According to the U.S. Census Bureau, the Piffard CDP has an area of 0.93 square miles (2.4 km^{2}), all land. The community sits on the western edge of the valley of the Genesee River.

== Demographics ==
(See table to the right.)

Historical population
Census	Pop.	Note	%±
2020	208		—
U.S. Decennial Census

== Notable people ==
Born in Piffard:

- Henry Granger Piffard (1842–1910), New York dermatologist and author of the first systematic treatise on dermatology in America
- Daylon Swearingen (1999–), professional bull rider and winner of the 2022 Professional Bull Riders World Championship.
