= Charles R. Cameron =

American diplomat (1875–1946)

Charles Raymond Cameron (June 25, 1875 – 1946) was a member of the United States Foreign Service in Latin America and Southeast Asia for over 40 years during the early 20th century.

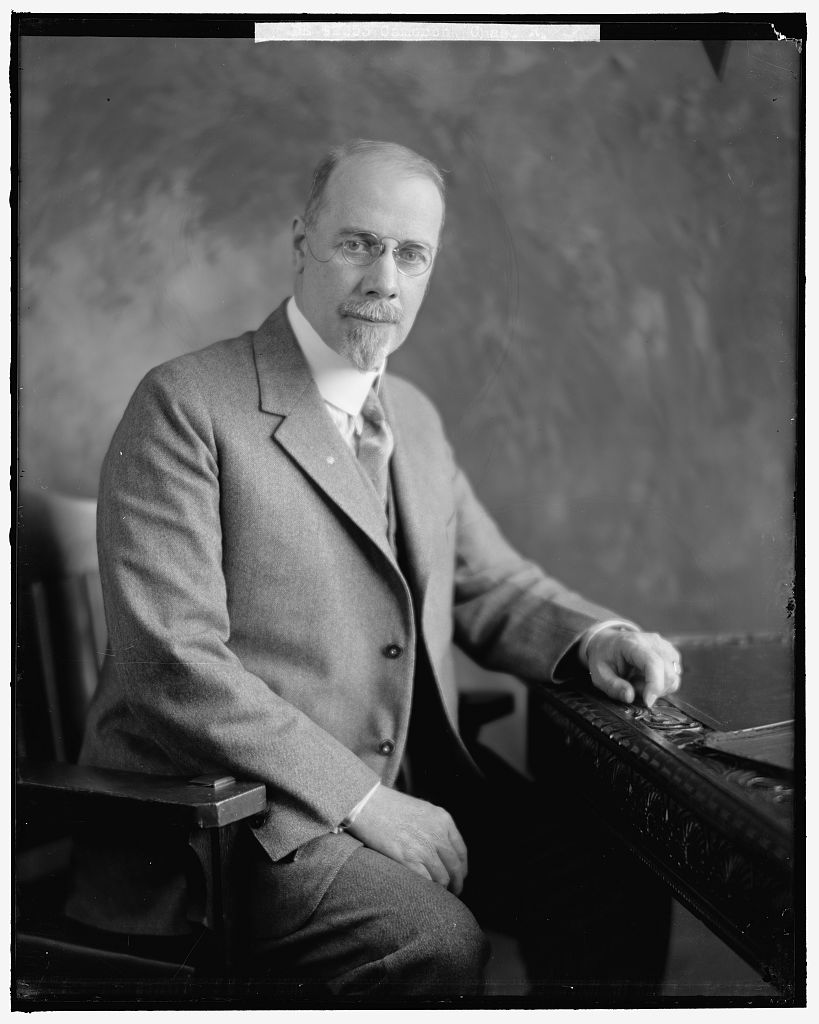
Charles R. Cameron in 1905

== Biography ==
Charles Raymond Cameron was born in York, New York to John and Catherine McDougall Cameron. He graduated from Cornell University in 1898. He died in 1946 at Tucson, Arizona and is buried at the Mumford Rural Cemetery in Monroe County, New York.

== Career ==
After graduation from Cornell University in 1898, Cameron accepted a teaching position at Zamboanga, in the Philippines, newly acquired by the United States as a result of the Spanish–American War. He soon advanced to Superintendent of Schools, and then to Acting Secretary of the provincial government of the Philippine Islands. He accepted a commission as an army captain in the Aviation Section, Signal Officers Reserve Corps in Washington, D.C. during World War I. After his military service, he joined the United States Foreign Service, receiving recommendations from military leaders, including General John J. Pershing, a friend. Cameron went on to serve with the Foreign Service as U.S. Consul in Tacna, Peru from 1919 to 1920; Pernambuco, Brazil from 1920 to 1923; Tokyo, 1923–1925; and São Paulo, Brazil from 1927 to 1929. He was U.S. Consul General in São Paulo, 1930–1933; Havana, 1934–35; and finally Tokyo in 1938 before his retirement in 1941.
