= York (CDP), New York =

York Hamlet, New York
- Census-designated place
- Location within New York Location within the United States
- Coordinates: 42°52′10″N 77°53′9″W
- Country: United States
- State: New York
- County: Livingston
- Town: York

Area
  - Total: 2.75 sq mi (7.13 km^{2})
  - Land: 2.75 sq mi (7.13 km^{2})
  - Water: 0 sq mi (0.00 km^{2})
- Elevation: 781 ft (238 m)

Population (2020)
  - Total: 488
  - Density: 177.2/sq mi (68.41/km^{2})
- Time zone: UTC-5 (Eastern (EST))
  - Summer (DST): UTC-4 (EDT)
- ZIP Codes: 14592 (York); 14533 (Piffard)
- Area code: 585
- GNIS feature ID: 2584306
- FIPS code: 36-84035

York is a hamlet and census-designated place (CDP) in the town of York, Livingston County, New York, United States. Its population was 544 as of the 2010 census. New York State Route 36 passes through the community.

== Geography ==
The hamlet is in northwestern Livingston County, in the center of the town of York. NY 36 leads north 8 miles (13 km) to Caledonia and south 6 miles (10 km) to Leicester. Geneseo, the Livingston county seat, is 7 miles (11 km) to the southeast.

According to the U.S. Census Bureau, the York CDP has an area of 2.754 square miles (7.13 km^{2}), all of it recorded as land. Browns Creek runs through the north side of the community, flowing east to the Genesee River.

== Demographics ==
Historical population
Census	Pop.	Note	%±
2020	488		—
U.S. Decennial Census
