= Geneseo Central School District =

School district in New York, United States

Address
- 4050 Avon Road Geneseo, New York, 14454; United States
- Coordinates: 42°48′43″N 77°48′30″W

District information
- Type: Public
- Grades: PreK–12
- NCES District ID: 3611940

Students and staff
- Students: 853
- Teachers: 93.5
- Staff: 91.4
- Student–teacher ratio: 9.12

Other information
- Website: www.geneseocsd.org

The Geneseo Central School District is a public school district in Geneseo, New York, United States. The district encompasses 70 square miles (180 km^{2}). "Geneseo" in the Seneca language means "pleasant valley".

It has two schools: Geneseo Elementary School and Geneseo Middle/High School.

== Description ==
The classrooms and library include computers. The school campus consists of three adjoining buildings and has a 600-seat auditorium, two gymnasiums, a pool, and a lighted playing field for track, football and soccer. A new entryway and lobby were added in 2006 as part of a 9.9 million dollar renovation project. The project also provided upgraded heating, ventilation and air conditioning, new lights, ceilings and floors. High school science classrooms were also reconstructed and modernized during this project. All classrooms are equipped with a digital projector and most rooms have an interactive whiteboard.

Grades K-5 enroll about 400 students. The middle school/high school houses grades 6–12. Grades 6-12 contain about 500 students. The district currently has 178 staff members. The elementary school and high school have 76 staff members each.

The district offers foreign language classes, music, and art. The schools have three guidance counselors and two psychologists.

Geneseo's President of the Board of Education is Jenn Mehlenbacher.

== History ==
In 1820, the first school in Geneseo was built in the center of town on land donated by James Wadsworth and William Wadsworth. The Wadsworths had purchased tens of thousands of acres from the Seneca tribe of Native Americans around 1790. In 1779, during the American Revolution, the Senecas fled Geneseo because of the Sullivan Expedition.

In 1932 the school became a museum when the state college opened Holcomb School. This school later closed and became the Welles Building, now part of the State University of New York at Geneseo campus. Holcomb School was named after Dr. Winfield A. Holcomb, a president of Geneseo State Normal School, a predecessor of today's SUNY school.

Holcomb School was moved to a new building, which was torn down in 2012 to make room for a sports building for the college at Geneseo.

Geneseo's high school opened in 1830. It was located on the east side of the village. It was at first called Livingston County High School, and later the Geneseo Academy. It closed in the early 1870s. This was because Geneseo State Normal School opened a high school within its building.

In 1930 Geneseo began building a high school again to replace the Normal School's high school. The new high school building was built on 79 acres of land donated by the Wadsworths, and opened in 1933. The building is now known as the Doty Building. The high school moved to its present location in 1974.
