= Geneseo Historic District =

Historic district in New York, United States

- U.S. National Register of Historic Places
- U.S. National Historic Landmark District
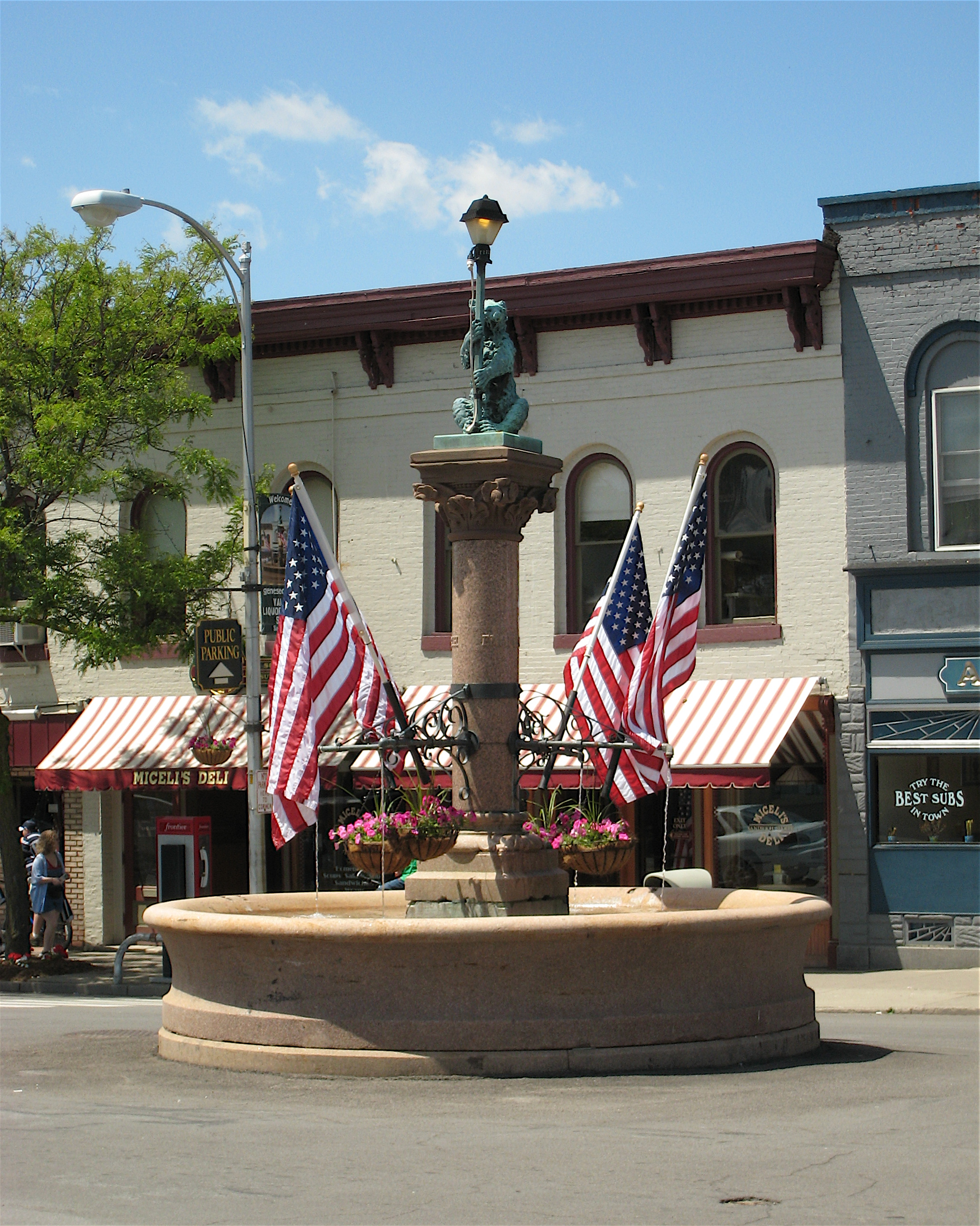
- Main Street’s Bear Fountain, the best-known symbol of Geneseo, here decorated with flags for Memorial Day.

- Location within New York Location within the United States
- Location: Geneseo, New York
- Coordinates: 42.796237°N 77.816771°W
- Area: 608 acres (246 ha)
- Architect: Claude Bragdon, et al. (original); Robert Sherlock, et al. (increase)
- Architectural style: Italianate, Federal, Queen Anne (original); Mid–19th Century Revival, Late 19th and 20th Century Revivals, Late Victorian (increase)
- NRHP reference No.: 77000948 (original); 85000642 (increase)

Significant dates
- Added to NRHP: July 9, 1977
- Boundary increase: March 21, 1985
- Designated NHLD: July 17, 1991

The Geneseo Historic District, previously known as the Main Street Historic District, is a historic district encompassing much of the village center of Geneseo, New York. Geneseo has a remarkably well-preserved 19th-century streetscape, with Victorian architecture embodying a picturesque style advocated by architect Andrew Jackson Downing. The district was listed on the National Register of Historic Places in 1977; an enlarged district was designated a National Historic Landmark in 1991.

== Description and history ==
Geneseo was founded in 1790 by William and James Wadsworth, whose descendants exerted a significant influence on the development of the community. In addition to their philanthropic and business contributions to the town, the Wadsworths planted many oak trees, with the result that the village now has a large number of mature trees approaching 200 years or more in age. The town served as a market center for the surrounding rural agricultural areas in the first half of the 19th century, and was boosted economically by the establishment of a state normal school (now SUNY Geneseo) on a campus west of the village's commercial district. The downtown suffered a devastating fire in 1864, but was rebuilt.

The district includes Geneseo's historic commercial center and its most refined residential neighborhood, plus the 102.8-acre (0.416 km^{2}) estate of the Wadsworth family. That estate, The Homestead (Geneseo) was already separately listed in 1974. The district consists of 312 properties, of which 288 are contributing. The district's buildings are stylistically somewhat diverse, with Italianate and Queen Anne Victorian styles of the second half of the 19th century dominating. Many older homes, originally built in the Federal style, were later renovated into these styles.

== Properties ==
Properties included in the district include:

- Temple Hill Cemetery
- Avon Road, east side:
  - The Hartford House, c. 1836, another Wadsworth family property.
- Avon Road, west side:
  - Soldiers Monument
  - St. Mary's Roman Catholic Church
  - St. Mary's Rectory
- Center Street, north side:
  - Thirty residences and buildings, from 3 Center Street up to 81 Center Street
  - Central Presbyterian Church (c.1939)
- Center Street, south side:
  - ...
- 2nd St.
  - Wadsworth Library
- Geneseo Baptist Church
- Old Antheum Library

(to be expanded)

== See also ==
- National Register of Historic Places listings in Livingston County, New York
- List of National Historic Landmarks in New York
