= The Homestead (Geneseo, New York) =

Historic house in New York, United States

- U.S. National Register of Historic Places
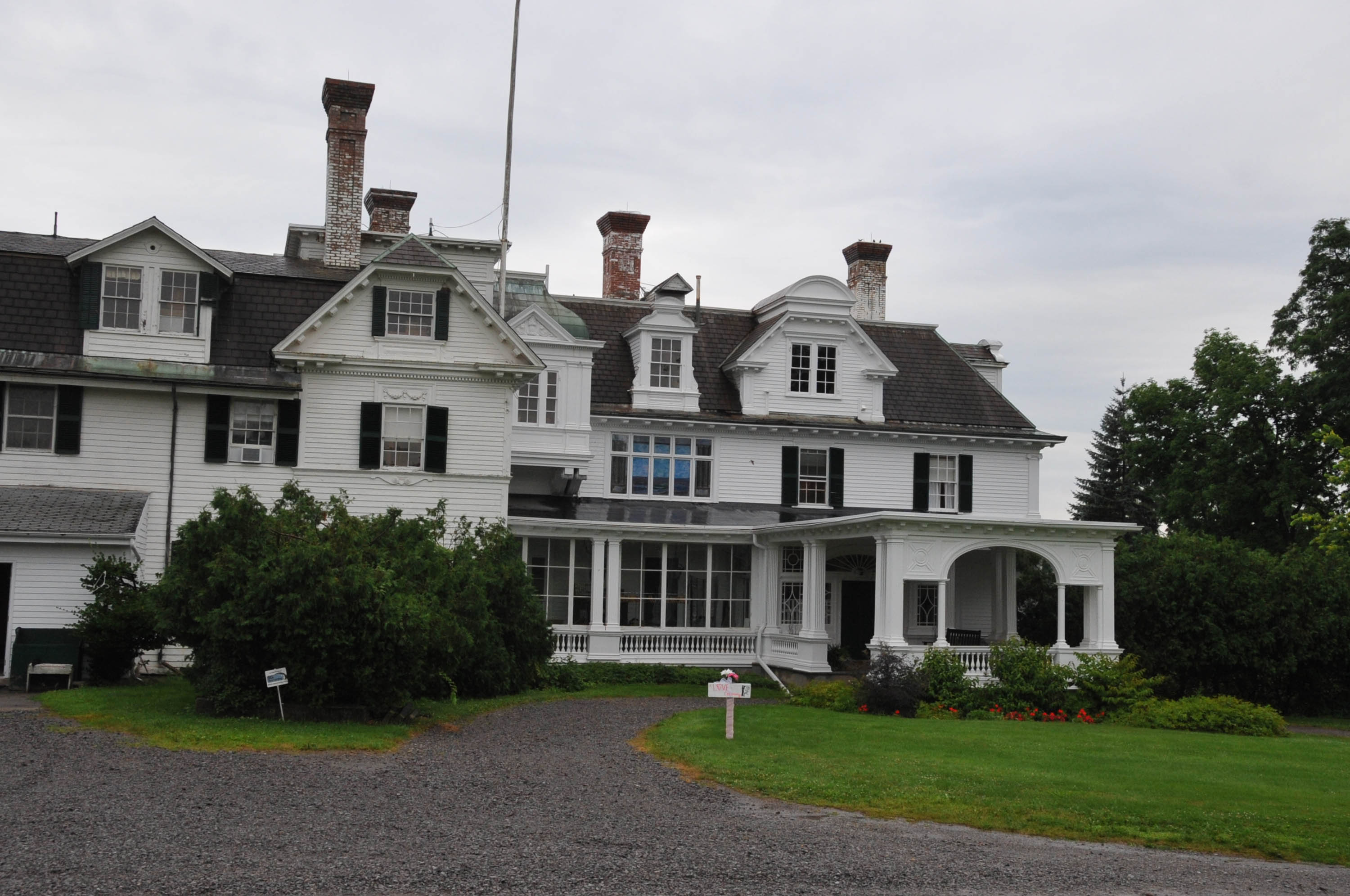

- Location within New York Location within the United States
- Location: NY 39 and U.S. 20A, Geneseo, New York
- Coordinates: 42°47′26″N 77°49′6″W
- Built: 1804
- Built by: William Wadsworth
- NRHP reference No.: 74001254
- Added to NRHP: August 30, 1974

The Homestead in Geneseo, New York is a historic house that was listed on the National Register of Historic Places in 1974. It is also a contributing property within the Geneseo Historic District, and is described in the district's National Historic Landmark nomination. The house was built by William Wadsworth, and continues to be owned by the Wadsworth family of Geneseo, New York.

== See also ==
- List of Registered Historic Places in Livingston County, New York
