= Geneseo (village), New York =

Geneseo, New York
- Village
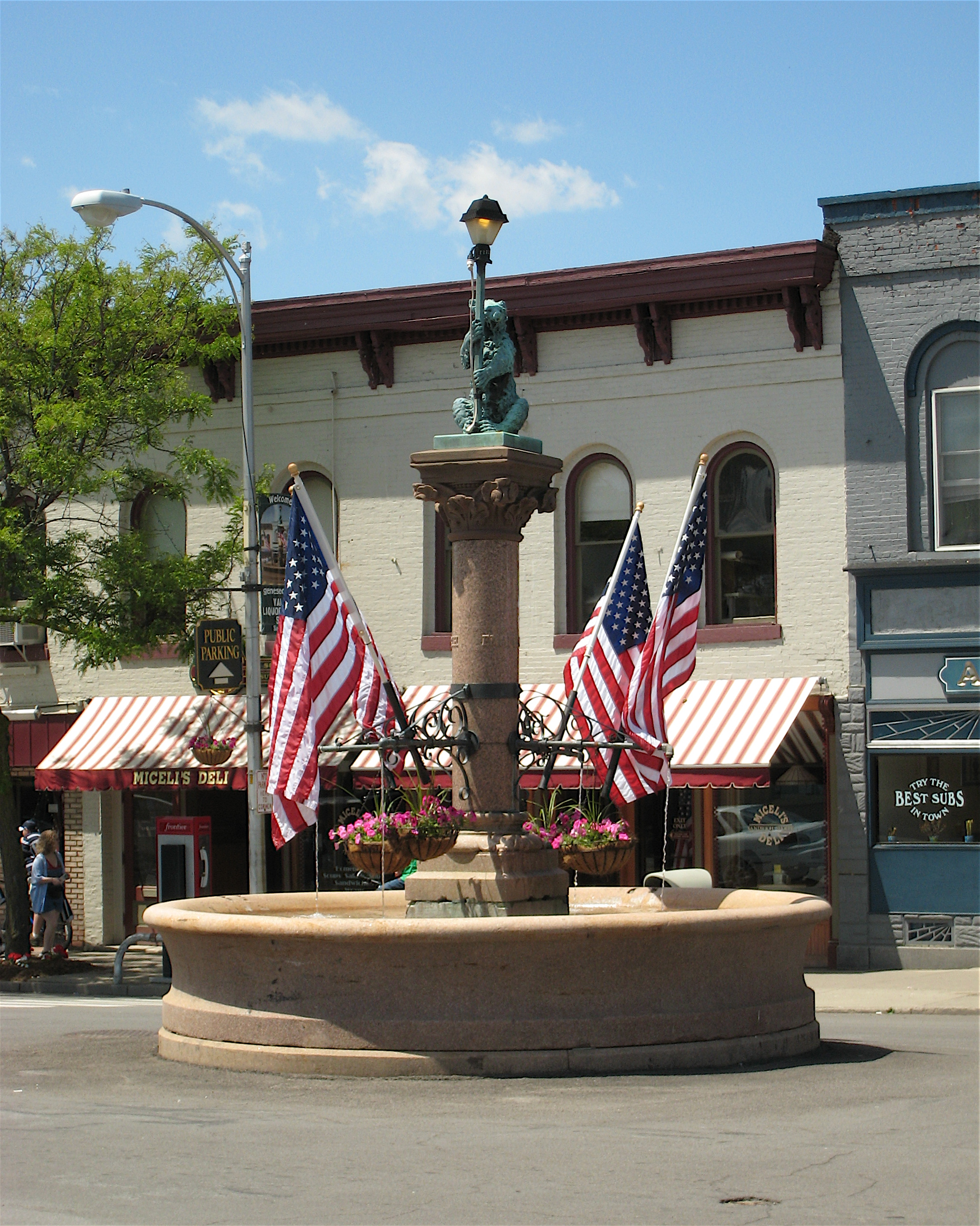
- The Bear Fountain sits in the center of Geneseo's Main Street. In this picture, it is decorated with flags for Memorial Day.

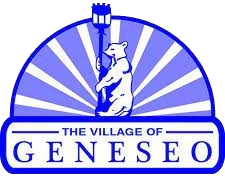
- Seal

- Location within New York Location within the United States
- Coordinates: 42°47′45″N 77°48′49″W
- Country: United States
- State: New York
- County: Livingston
- Town: Geneseo
- Village incorporated: 1832

Government
  - Type: Village Board
  - Mayor: Christopher Ivers

Area
  - Total: 2.85 sq mi (7.38 km^{2})
  - Land: 2.85 sq mi (7.38 km^{2})
  - Water: 0 sq mi (0.00 km^{2})
- Elevation: 909 ft (277 m)

Population (2020)
  - Total: 7,574
  - Density: 2,658.2/sq mi (1,026.33/km^{2})
- Time zone: UTC-5 (Eastern (EST))
  - Summer (DST): UTC-4 (EDT)
- ZIP code: 14454
- Area code: 585
- FIPS code: 36-28618
- GNIS feature ID: 0978991
- Website: geneseony.org

Geneseo (/ˌdʒɛnɪˈsiːoʊ/ jen-i-SEE-oh) is a village in and the county seat of Livingston County in the Finger Lakes region of New York, United States, south of Rochester. The English name "Geneseo" is an anglicization of the Seneca name for the earlier Seneca town there, Jo’néhsiyoh, meaning "Good sand there."

The village of Geneseo lies within the western part of the town of Geneseo at the junction of State Routes 39 and 63 with U.S. Route 20A. The village's population was 8,031 at the 2010 census, out of 10,483 in the town. The United States Department of the Interior designated part of the village—the Geneseo Historic District—a National Historic Landmark in 1991.

== History ==
The town of Geneseo was established in 1789, before the formation of Livingston County. Settlement began shortly after James and William Wadsworth arrived in 1790. The brothers came to the Genesee Valley from Connecticut as agents of their uncle, Colonel Jeremiah Wadsworth, to care for and sell the land he purchased. The Wadsworths were participants in the negotiations of the Treaty of Big Tree between Robert Morris and the Senecas at the site of Geneseo in 1797.

Geneseo, as well as nearby Mount Morris, were part of the Morris Reserve that Morris held back from his sale of much of western New York to the Holland Land Company.

The village of Geneseo became the county seat of Livingston County in 1821 and was incorporated in 1832. The State Normal School, now SUNY Geneseo, opened in 1871. A portion of the village was designated a National Historic Landmark by the United States Department of the Interior in 1991.

By 1835, the village consisted of 83 families, and the streets were Main, Second, North, South, Center and Temple Hill. The village grew steadily, and in the 1850s Elm Street was opened. The advent of the State Normal School in 1871 brought a surge of development, and Oak Street opened in the late 1880s. The private Temple Hill Academy, part of which still stands on Temple Hill Road, educated Chester A. Arthur among others.

During the Civil War, Union soldiers trained at Camp Union, located at what is now the corner of Lima Road and Rorbach Lane. During World War II, a prisoner-of-war camp was built in Geneseo; it housed mostly Italian soldiers.

=== Present day ===
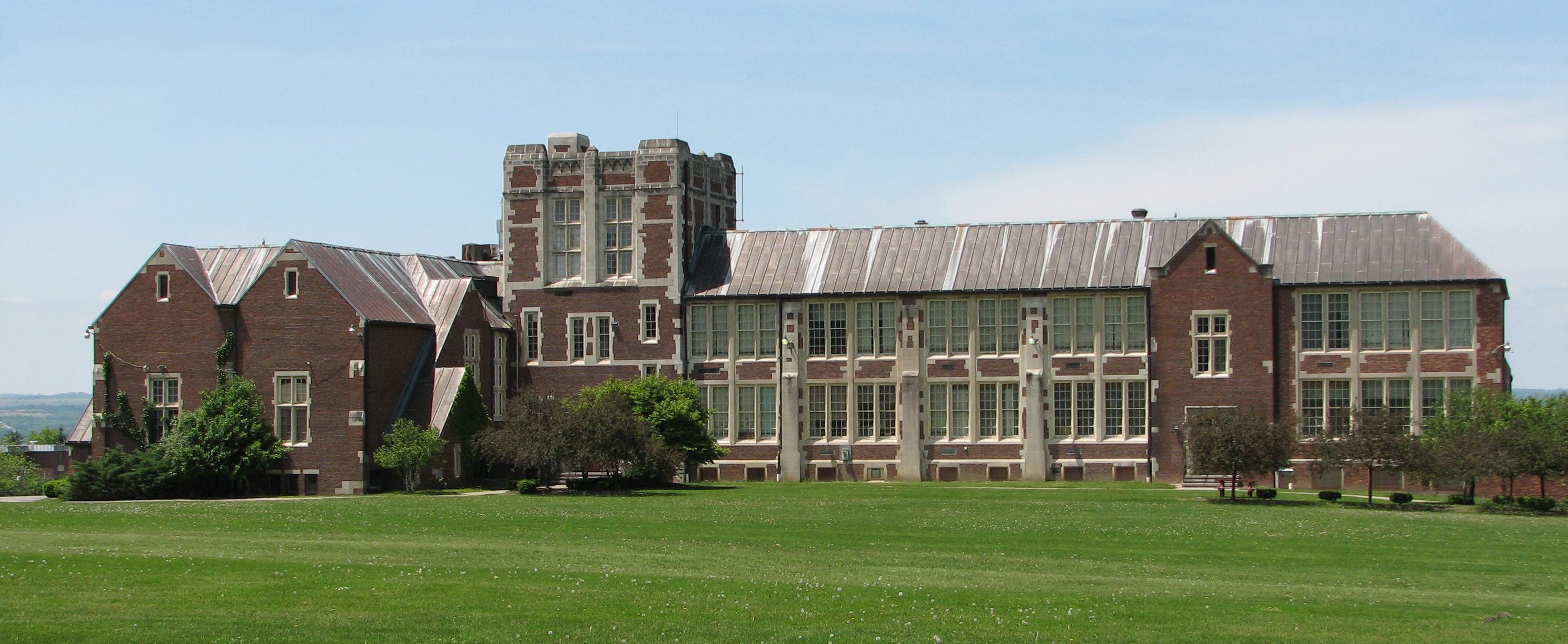
The Doty building, which was purchased and is being renovated for usage by SUNY Geneseo, was once Geneseo's high school.

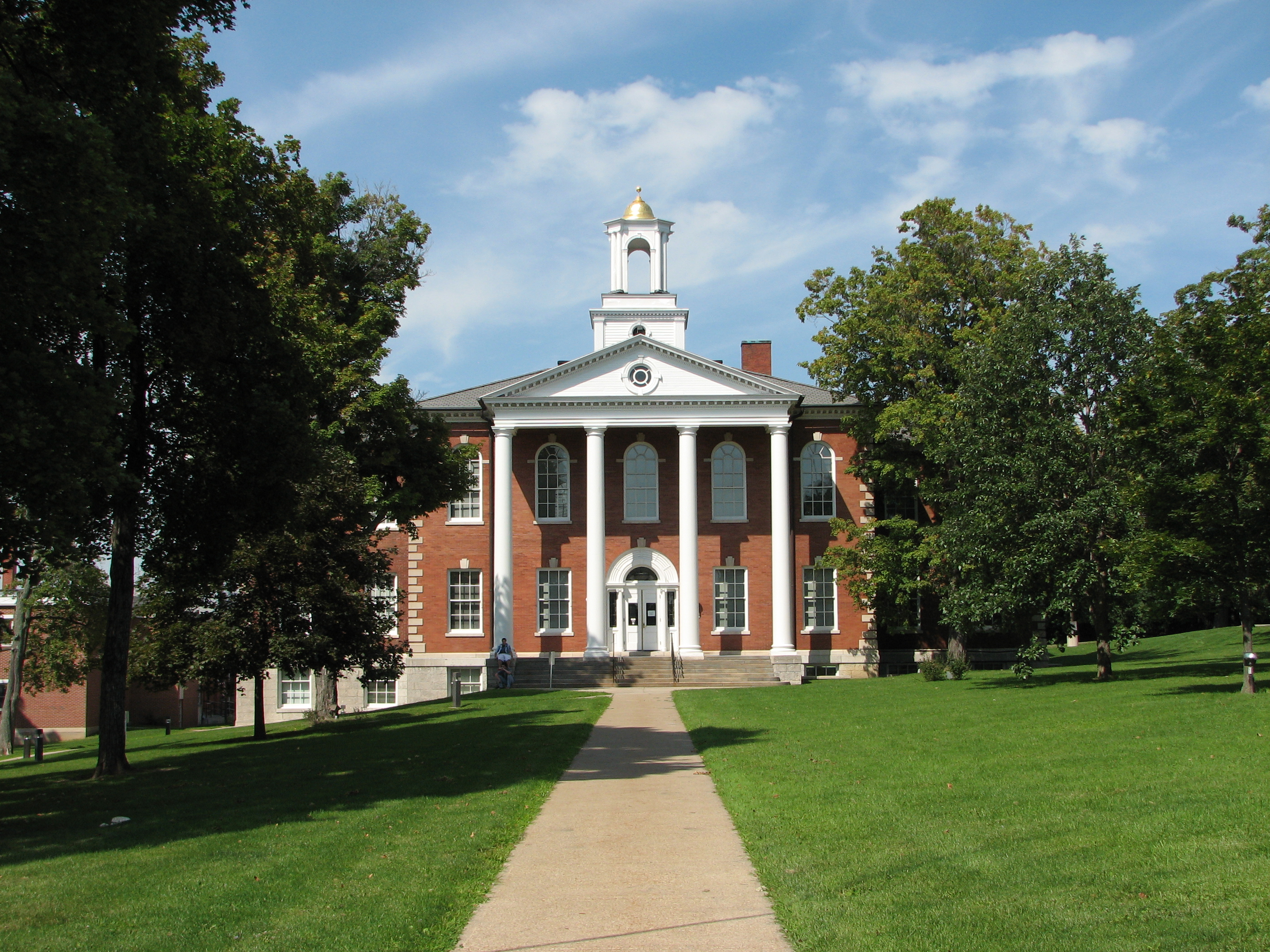
The Livingston County Courthouse and offices are located at the end of Main Street.

In its addition of Geneseo to the National Register of Historic Places in 1991, the National Park Service said,

One of the most remarkably preserved villages in northwestern New York, Geneseo is one of the best examples of "picturesque" architecture and town planning as expounded by American landscape architect Andrew Jackson Downing (1815−1852) in his enormously popular and influential books. The cohesive quality of the surviving town displays a textbook of styles and is almost unique in American architectural history. The relatively sophisticated and imposing structures included in the district reflect the village's early-19th century prosperity as a market place for the valley's farming communities.

The valley of the Genesee is wide and fertile, with some of the best agricultural land in New York, but it was prone to flooding, and Geneseo suffered several bad floods until the Army Corps of Engineers' construction of the Mount Morris Dam upstream of the community in the 1950s. Agriculture is still a large contributor to Geneseo's economy, but many use the area as a bedroom community for jobs in the Rochester area to the north. The village of Geneseo is governed by a mayor and four trustees.

The Association for the Preservation of Geneseo (APOG) is a civic organization dedicated to preserving, improving, and restoring the places of civic, architectural, and historic interest to Geneseo and to educate members of the community to their architectural and historical heritage. Additional aims and purposes are to encourage others to contribute their knowledge, advice, and financial assistance.

In July 2007, Money magazine ranked Geneseo 10th of 25 on its places with the highest percentage of singles, with 65.1% of the 7,500 inhabitants reported to be single.

In addition to the Geneseo Historic District, one individual building, The Homestead, is listed on the National Register of Historic Places.

One of the village's landmarks, a fountain in the middle of Main Street built in the 1880s, was damaged when a tractor trailer crashed into it on April 7, 2016.

== Education ==
The Geneseo Central School District encompasses Geneseo and Groveland. Geneseo Middle/High School graduates approximately 75 students each year.

The school mascot is the Blue Devils and teams wear blue and white, with a gray accent color. Past accent colors included red and black.

The school was located on Temple Hill from about 1830 to 1871 when it moved to Center Street. In 1933 it moved to its own building on School Street and in 1963 added a wing. In 1974 it moved into a new building at its present location on Avon Road.

The State University of New York at Geneseo has approximately 5,000 undergraduate students. It is a four-year public liberal arts college, which is one of the top SUNY schools.

== Geography ==
According to the United States Census Bureau, the village has a total area of 2.9 square miles (7.4 km^{2}), all land.

The Genesee River defines the western village line. U.S. Route 20A passes through the village from east to west, while New York State Routes 39 and 63 pass through the village running north to south. Interstate 390 passes south and east of the village, with Exit 8 5 miles (8 km) east of the village on US 20A, and Exit 7 4 miles (6 km) to the south via NY 63. Geneseo is 30 miles (48 km) southwest of Rochester, 25 miles (40 km) southeast of Batavia, and 18 miles (29 km) northwest of Dansville.

== Climate ==
Geneseo has a mild climate; summers typically bring temperatures between 60 and 80 °F (16 and 27 °C), while winters average 15 to 35 °F (−9 to 2 °C).

Climate data for Geneseo, New York
Month	Jan	Feb	Mar	Apr	May	Jun	Jul	Aug	Sep	Oct	Nov	Dec	Year
Record high °F (°C)	67 (19)	72 (22)	84 (29)	91 (33)	92 (33)	95 (35)	99 (37)	97 (36)	94 (34)	83 (28)	77 (25)	71 (22)	99 (37)
Mean daily maximum °F (°C)	32 (0)	34 (1)	42 (6)	55 (13)	68 (20)	77 (25)	81 (27)	79 (26)	71 (22)	60 (16)	48 (9)	37 (3)	57 (14)
Mean daily minimum °F (°C)	16 (−9)	16 (−9)	24 (−4)	34 (1)	45 (7)	55 (13)	59 (15)	57 (14)	50 (10)	39 (4)	32 (0)	22 (−6)	37 (3)
Record low °F (°C)	−24 (−31)	−13 (−25)	−9 (−23)	11 (−12)	29 (−2)	35 (2)	45 (7)	37 (3)	28 (−2)	21 (−6)	11 (−12)	−7 (−22)	−24 (−31)
Average precipitation inches (mm)	1.57 (40)	1.42 (36)	2.20 (56)	2.48 (63)	3.00 (76)	3.75 (95)	3.78 (96)	3.18 (81)	3.20 (81)	2.56 (65)	2.45 (62)	1.93 (49)	31.52 (801)
Source: The Weather Channel

== Demographics ==
Historical population
Census	Pop.	Note	%±
1880	1,925		—
1890	2,286		18.8%
1900	2,400		5.0%
1910	2,067		−13.9%
1920	2,157		4.4%
1930	2,261		4.8%
1940	2,144		−5.2%
1950	2,838		32.4%
1960	3,284		15.7%
1970	5,714		74.0%
1980	6,746		18.1%
1990	7,187		6.5%
2000	7,579		5.5%
2010	8,031		6.0%
2020	7,574		−5.7%
U.S. Decennial Census

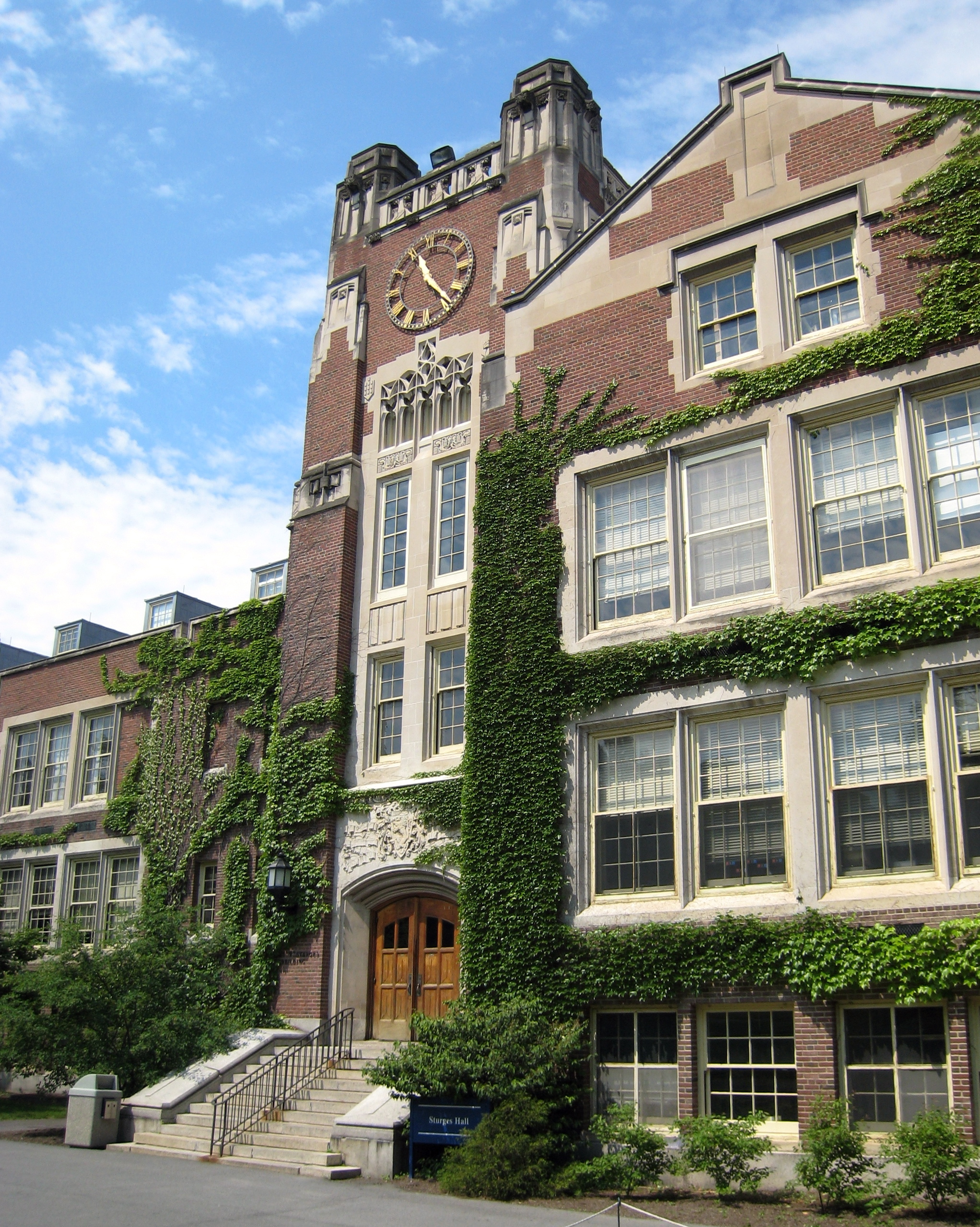
Sturges Hall is SUNY Geneseo's landmark building.

As of the census of 2000, there were 7,579 people, 1,718 households, and 730 families residing in the village. The population density was 2,718.3 inhabitants per square mile (1,049.5/km^{2}). There were 1,780 housing units at an average density of 638.4 per sq mi (246.5 per km^{2}). The racial makeup of the village was 92.7% White, 1.8% African American, 0.1% Native American, 3.3% Asian, 0.9% from other races, and 1.2% from two or more races. Hispanic or Latino of any race were 2.6% of the population.

There were 1,718 households, out of which 19.7% had children under the age of 18 living with them, 31.8% were married couples living together, 9.0% had a female householder with no husband present, and 57.5% were non-families. 28.4% of all households were made up of individuals, and 10.8% had someone living alone who was 65 years of age or older. The average household size was 2.52 and the average family size was 2.86.

In the village, the population was spread out, with 8.6% under the age of 18, 63.5% from 18 to 24, 10.9% from 25 to 44, 9.3% from 45 to 64, and 7.8% who were 65 years of age or older. The median age was 21.1 years. For every 100 females, there were 65.6 males. For every 100 females age 18 and over, there were 62.5 males.

The median income for a household in the village was $30,438, and the median income for a family was $59,500. Males had a median income of $40,915 versus $26,382 for females. The per capita income for the village was $12,239. About 14.1% of families and 41.7% of the population were below the poverty line, including 19.4% of those under the age of 18 and 7.0% ages 65 or older.

== Popular culture ==
The Person of Interest TV series (2011–2016) featured a three-second clip of Geneseo's Main Street. The clip appeared in the 21st episode of Season 1, entitled "Many Happy Returns". It originally aired on May 3, 2012.

== Notable people ==
- Philo C. Fuller, US congressman
- Gregg "Opie" Hughes, radio talk show host
- Orange Jacobs, American judge
- William H. Kelsey, US congressman
- James S. Wadsworth, Union general in the American Civil War
- James Wolcott Wadsworth Jr., US congressman
