= List of census-designated places in New York =

This is a list of census-designated places in New York. As of the 2020 census, New York had 699 census-designated places (CDPs).

Three sets of CDPs share the same name but are located in different counties:

- Fairview (Dutchess County) & Fairview (Westchester County)
- Greenville (Greene County) & Greenville (Westchester County)
- Milton (Saratoga County) & Milton (Ulster County)

Census-designated places in New York
CDP name	County	Pop. (2020)	Land (sq mi)	Water (sq mi)	Coordinates	GEO ID (FIPS code)	ANSI code (GNIS ID)	Notes
Accord	Ulster	573	3.400	0.043	41.801649, -74.230348	3600155	02389116	
Adams Center	Jefferson	1,492	4.855	0.135	43.869969, -75.988612	3600232	02389117	
Akwesasne	Franklin & St. Lawrence	4,527	41.613	3.203	44.968597, -74.665983	3600457	02806937	
Albertson	Nassau	5,220	0.680	0.000	40.771580, -73.648155	3601011	02389121	
Altmar	Oswego	357	2.069	0.010	43.511877, -76.000756	3601550	02772072	
Altona	Clinton	662	1.709	0.000	44.890097, -73.659565	3601572	02389128	
Amagansett	Suffolk	1,824	6.527	0.024	40.989824, -72.129707	3601594	02389130	
Amenia	Dutchess	725	1.218	0.027	41.848205, -73.555583	3601682	02389131	
Andes	Delaware	189	1.193	0.000	42.187559, -74.780523	3602121	02627968	
Angola on the Lake	Erie	1,481	2.546	0.000	42.654965, -79.052239	3602220	02389136	
Apalachin	Tioga	2,632	2.876	0.000	42.063844, -76.156757	3602308	02389140	
Aquebogue	Suffolk	2,547	3.812	0.099	40.943988, -72.615472	3602374	02389141	
Arlington	Dutchess	3,010	0.668	0.000	41.695869, -73.898881	3602616	02389147	
Armonk	Westchester	4,495	5.966	0.093	41.133800, -73.717990	3602649	02389150	
Au Sable Forks	Clinton	509	2.520	0.023	44.454707, -73.670879	3603254	02389158	
Averill Park	Rensselaer	2,098	2.933	0.118	42.638827, -73.550665	3603320	02389161	
Baiting Hollow	Suffolk	2,763	3.213	0.000	40.964623, -72.740315	3604055	02389167	
Baldwin	Nassau	33,919	4.114	0.595	40.650127, -73.607709	3604143	02389168	
Balmville	Orange	3,197	2.117	0.004	41.527905, -74.024627	3604286	02389171	
Bard College	Dutchess	358	0.801	0.000	42.022816, -73.909367	3604388	02806923	
Bardonia	Rockland	4,249	2.574	0.355	41.113952, -73.979297	3604396	02389173	
Barneveld	Oneida	272	0.423	0.000	43.273791, -75.189029	3604528	02791520	
Barnum Island	Nassau	2,590	0.879	0.388	40.606348, -73.645982	3604550	02389175	
Barrytown	Dutchess	100	0.132	0.000	42.000126, -73.925973	3604605	02806924	
Barryville	Sullivan	222	0.679	0.051	41.481262, -74.916801	3604616	02806961	
Bay Park	Nassau	2,117	0.500	0.102	40.629489, -73.667813	3604891	02389178	
Bay Shore	Suffolk	29,244	5.368	0.159	40.730313, -73.249320	3604935	02389179	
Bayport	Suffolk	8,609	3.720	0.076	40.745984, -73.056388	3604913	02389180	
Baywood	Suffolk	7,726	2.260	0.000	40.753377, -73.290032	3605039	02389181	
Beaver Dam Lake	Orange	2,609	1.812	0.298	41.447070, -74.115875	3605193	02389188	
Bedford	Westchester	1,691	3.507	0.048	41.195974, -73.645855	3605309	02389190	
Bedford Hills	Westchester	3,239	1.006	0.000	41.240568, -73.688077	3605342	02585491	
Belfast	Allegany	745	1.385	0.027	42.336195, -78.116873	3605562	02627970	
Bellerose Terrace	Nassau	2,329	0.125	0.000	40.722147, -73.725146	3605661	02389196	
Belleville	Jefferson	233	0.264	0.000	43.784192, -76.116915	3605683	02584243	
Bellmore	Nassau	16,297	2.359	0.615	40.658699, -73.527056	3605738	02389199	
Bethpage	Nassau	16,658	3.576	0.000	40.749518, -73.485536	3606387	02389207	
Big Flats	Chemung	5,555	16.300	0.077	42.163617, -76.908739	3606464	02389210	
Billington Heights	Erie	1,748	3.193	0.007	42.785031, -78.626552	3606574	02389211	
Binghamton University	Broome	7,261	0.775	0.000	42.089141, -75.968456	3606644	02631223	
Blauvelt	Rockland	5,548	4.502	0.105	41.068258, -73.954975	3606860	02389215	
Bliss	Wyoming	496	9.792	0.000	42.580138, -78.253745	3606904	02627975	
Blodgett Mills	Cortland	274	2.174	0.000	42.566516, -76.132873	3606937	02627977	
Bloomville	Delaware	173	1.317	0.002	42.334396, -74.822777	3607025	02627981	
Blue Point	Suffolk	5,156	1.794	0.006	40.751516, -73.035841	3607069	02389219	
Bohemia	Suffolk	9,852	8.620	0.037	40.776697, -73.134857	3607157	02389223	
Bolton Landing	Warren	518	1.062	0.176	43.562185, -73.657030	3607245	02631634	
Brasher Falls	St. Lawrence	674	1.638	0.101	44.813979, -74.788948	3607960	02584244	
Breesport	Chemung	629	1.628	0.012	42.184071, -76.739368	3608004	02631224	
Brentwood	Suffolk	62,387	10.981	0.000	40.783912, -73.252145	3608026	02389235	
Brewerton	Onondaga & Oswego	3,907	3.166	0.172	43.232299, -76.144961	3608059	02389237	
Brewster Heights	Putnam	1,076	0.527	0.000	41.407277, -73.628568	3608081	02812768	
Brewster Hill	Putnam	1,924	0.870	0.110	41.421304, -73.606864	3608092	02389238	
Bridgehampton	Suffolk	2,953	13.010	0.623	40.950702, -72.313334	3608136	02389240	
Bridgeport	Madison & Onondaga	1,389	1.724	0.015	43.149437, -75.985320	3608147	02389241	
Bridgeville	Sullivan	149	1.674	0.000	41.631905, -74.626868	3608158	02806962	
Bridgewater	Oneida	516	0.971	0.000	42.877568, -75.250948	3608169	02771601	
Brighton	Monroe	37,137	15.416	0.168	43.118015, -77.582070	3608257	02389242	
Brinckerhoff	Dutchess	3,377	1.120	0.005	41.551937, -73.870924	3608334	02389243	
Brookhaven	Suffolk	3,330	5.761	0.146	40.776671, -72.907833	3609000	02389246	
Brooktondale	Tompkins	261	0.244	0.003	42.381966, -76.396957	3610077	02806979	
Burlington Flats	Otsego	143	2.300	0.000	42.740306, -75.184322	3611220	02804334	
Busti	Chautauqua	349	2.264	0.000	42.042324, -79.278902	3611440	02628040	
Byersville	Livingston	44	0.510	0.000	42.583882, -77.791523	3611550	02584245	
Cadyville	Clinton	479	1.086	0.118	44.698495, -73.653440	3611616	02806922	
Cairo	Greene	1,368	4.227	0.006	42.305447, -74.012401	3611638	02389263	
Calcium	Jefferson	3,573	5.544	0.002	44.051919, -75.848347	3611671	02389264	
Callicoon	Sullivan	206	0.359	0.086	41.766858, -75.062027	3611748	02389266	
Calverton	Suffolk	5,934	28.027	0.501	40.922929, -72.768549	3611781	02389270	
Campbell	Steuben	659	1.761	0.000	42.235043, -77.193694	3611935	02631225	
Captree	Suffolk	48	1.617	1.179	40.646074, -73.257051	3612402	02805097	
Carle Place	Nassau	5,005	0.935	0.000	40.750026, -73.612123	3612419	02389277	
Carmel	Putnam	7,538	8.335	2.055	41.420695, -73.687422	3612518	02389278	
Caroga Lake	Fulton	548	2.500	0.873	43.133971, -74.481652	3612584	02631638	
Cementon	Greene	164	0.329	0.000	42.135666, -73.919324	3613299	02804325	
Center Moriches	Suffolk	8,046	5.217	0.415	40.802046, -72.795166	3613420	02389295	
Centereach	Suffolk	30,980	8.714	0.000	40.869533, -73.080780	3613376	02389296	
Centerport	Suffolk	5,822	2.104	0.190	40.900759, -73.372447	3613442	02389297	
Central Bridge	Schoharie	740	1.843	0.014	42.706904, -74.347695	3613530	02628041	
Central Islip	Suffolk	36,714	7.111	0.000	40.783767, -73.194479	3613552	02389298	
Chadwicks	Oneida	1,291	1.327	0.000	43.029195, -75.270992	3613662	02584246	
Chappaqua	Westchester	2,598	0.450	0.000	41.160201, -73.767093	3613805	02389303	
Chautauqua	Chautauqua	218	0.427	0.000	42.210063, -79.469011	3614058	02631226	
Chazy	Clinton	548	1.696	0.018	44.890851, -73.429200	3614102	02631627	
Cheektowaga	Erie	76,829	25.343	0.057	42.909003, -78.750765	3615000	02389308	
Chelsea Cove	Dutchess	1,150	0.154	0.006	41.613245, -73.747012	3615060	02806926	
Chenango Bridge	Broome	2,884	2.448	0.144	42.171427, -75.857719	3615121	02628042	
Cherry Creek	Chautauqua	409	1.362	0.000	42.295846, -79.100858	3615187	02804867	
Chestertown	Warren	586	3.843	0.013	43.643112, -73.783522	3615363	02628043	
Clarence	Erie	2,733	2.845	0.065	42.975730, -78.595325	3615814	02631227	
Clarence Center	Erie	2,605	2.258	0.000	43.008425, -78.630815	3615836	02389322	
Clark Mills	Oneida	2,049	1.492	0.019	43.090139, -75.376258	3615902	02389324	
Clarkson	Monroe	4,694	9.111	0.000	43.239813, -77.916205	3615946	02631645	
Claverack-Red Mills	Columbia	953	2.978	0.018	42.229483, -73.720980	3616050	02389326	
Clifton Gardens	Saratoga	2,729	1.102	0.008	42.847118, -73.782601	3616298	02812770	
Clifton Knolls-Mill Creek	Saratoga	3,048	1.584	0.051	42.850658, -73.806356	3616322	02806958	
Clintondale	Ulster	1,938	5.572	0.039	41.692580, -74.048291	3616452	02389333	
Cold Spring Harbor	Suffolk	3,064	3.665	0.169	40.856500, -73.452894	3616958	02389342	
Colton	St. Lawrence	348	1.688	0.073	44.565081, -74.946568	3617398	02627943	
Commack	Suffolk	36,536	11.969	0.000	40.844220, -73.283382	3617530	02389350	
Conesus	Livingston	283	1.059	0.000	42.726333, -77.669676	3617607	02584247	
Conesus Lake	Livingston	2,270	4.361	5.050	42.802635, -77.700951	3617622	02584248	
Congers	Rockland	8,532	3.068	0.744	41.149595, -73.944776	3617739	02389353	
Constantia	Oswego	1,109	3.009	0.007	43.258167, -76.009605	3617893	02389355	
Coopers Plains	Steuben	609	0.824	0.000	42.179348, -77.137527	3618036	02631228	
Copake	Columbia	318	2.099	0.000	42.104073, -73.549565	3618091	02761350	
Copake Falls	Columbia	181	0.580	0.000	42.120223, -73.524723	3618113	02761352	
Copake Lake	Columbia	767	9.509	0.805	42.140365, -73.596698	3618124	02389356	
Copiague	Suffolk	23,429	3.218	0.028	40.671987, -73.393860	3618146	02389357	
Coram	Suffolk	40,220	13.824	0.000	40.881238, -73.005883	3618157	02389359	
Cortland West	Cortland	1,286	5.166	0.000	42.594187, -76.225853	3618443	02389362	
Country Knolls	Saratoga	5,349	1.582	0.001	42.910887, -73.806990	3618542	02389363	
Cragsmoor	Ulster	433	4.351	0.000	41.665464, -74.391234	3618762	02389367	
Cranberry Lake	St. Lawrence	174	19.437	0.276	44.180885, -74.868280	3618817	02627944	
Crest View Heights	Tioga	1,770	1.222	0.003	42.075728, -76.123409	3618993	02806977	
Crompond	Westchester	2,330	2.420	0.020	41.295265, -73.839963	3619092	02389376	
Crown Heights	Dutchess	2,872	0.844	0.000	41.641652, -73.928664	3619229	02389378	
Crugers	Westchester	1,627	0.661	0.574	41.231337, -73.925810	3619290	02389382	
Crystal Beach	Ontario	627	0.682	0.203	42.809769, -77.258293	3619308	02631229	
Cumberland Head	Clinton	1,735	3.591	0.000	44.716979, -73.396949	3619408	02389385	
Cumminsville	Livingston	161	0.131	0.000	42.570539, -77.718936	3619411	02584249	
Cutchogue	Suffolk	3,437	9.723	0.427	41.021223, -72.486958	3619466	02389387	
Cuylerville	Livingston	268	0.421	0.000	42.777692, -77.873758	3619510	02584250	
Dalton	Livingston	351	0.755	0.000	42.542227, -77.951938	3619587	02584251	
Danby	Tompkins	506	3.455	0.004	42.356588, -76.466818	3619609	02806980	
Davenport Center	Delaware	344	3.102	0.040	42.446299, -74.900839	3619774	02628044	
De Witt	Onondaga	11,247	3.835	0.008	43.038637, -76.072933	3620467	02806956	
DeKalb Junction	St. Lawrence	485	3.883	0.062	44.511735, -75.294703	3620049	02627945	
Deer Park	Suffolk	28,837	6.168	0.004	40.761441, -73.321736	3619972	02389400	
Depauville	Jefferson	488	9.822	0.000	44.142448, -76.045152	3620302	02389403	
Dix Hills	Suffolk	26,180	15.946	0.000	40.803547, -73.337053	3620687	02389409	
Dover Plains	Dutchess	1,322	0.677	0.015	41.739272, -73.573014	3620841	02389415	
Downsville	Delaware	474	3.953	0.079	42.081425, -74.996796	3620852	02628045	
Duane Lake	Schenectady	329	2.401	0.194	42.752239, -74.107327	3620989	02389418	
Duanesburg	Schenectady	379	2.449	0.096	42.763301, -74.133336	3620995	02389419	
Durhamville	Oneida	527	1.372	0.000	43.122562, -75.665000	3621226	02631640	
Eagle Bay	Herkimer	54	0.277	0.000	43.768644, -74.817367	3621380	02806938	
East Atlantic Beach	Nassau	2,101	0.315	0.368	40.585582, -73.712204	3621578	02389426	
East Avon	Livingston	618	1.310	0.000	42.912795, -77.707324	3621600	02584252	
East Durham	Greene	466	3.443	0.000	42.365650, -74.092526	3621919	02804326	
East Farmingdale	Suffolk	6,617	5.715	0.020	40.730277, -73.415045	3621985	02389429	
East Frankfort	Herkimer	496	0.792	0.000	43.016973, -75.064795	3622029	02806939	
East Glenville	Schenectady	11,896	10.060	0.297	42.864027, -73.928902	3622084	02389432	
East Greenbush	Rensselaer	6,266	3.917	0.016	42.595174, -73.704997	3622106	02389433	
East Hampton North	Suffolk	5,377	5.639	0.000	40.972518, -72.188770	3622200	02389434	
East Herkimer	Herkimer	787	1.193	0.030	43.031518, -74.964198	3622238	02806940	
East Islip	Suffolk	13,931	3.950	0.109	40.727670, -73.186648	3622315	02389436	
East Ithaca	Tompkins	3,175	1.733	0.050	42.426032, -76.464673	3622326	02389437	
East Kingston	Ulster	277	0.674	0.022	41.950860, -73.974595	3622370	02389438	
East Marion	Suffolk	1,048	2.238	0.128	41.131013, -72.345158	3622447	02389439	
East Massapequa	Nassau	19,854	3.440	0.113	40.676488, -73.435962	3622480	02389440	
East Meadow	Nassau	37,796	6.304	0.024	40.720115, -73.558861	3622502	02389441	
East Moriches	Suffolk	5,946	5.477	0.149	40.809637, -72.759740	3622546	02389442	
East Northport	Suffolk	20,048	5.161	0.000	40.879153, -73.323248	3622612	02389444	
East Norwich	Nassau	2,792	1.047	0.000	40.849552, -73.528864	3622623	02389445	
East Patchogue	Suffolk	21,580	8.346	0.131	40.770031, -72.981772	3622733	02389446	
East Quogue	Suffolk	5,557	8.874	2.685	40.849267, -72.578898	3622832	02389447	
East Randolph	Cattaraugus	571	1.109	0.001	42.168059, -78.957205	3622843	02746454	
East Setauket	Suffolk	10,998	6.022	0.056	40.920966, -73.093714	3622964	02805098	
East Shoreham	Suffolk	6,841	5.367	0.000	40.946028, -72.881168	3622980	02389450	
East Worcester	Otsego	327	2.514	0.000	42.628399, -74.674321	3623283	02804335	
Eastchester	Westchester	20,901	3.294	0.088	40.958347, -73.807489	3621809	02389453	
Eastport	Suffolk	2,219	5.258	0.130	40.841007, -72.725654	3622810	02389455	
Eatons Neck	Suffolk	1,334	1.005	0.000	40.933076, -73.394795	3623316	02389456	
Eden	Erie	3,346	5.594	0.000	42.652344, -78.901302	3623404	02389025	
Edmeston	Otsego	592	4.345	0.000	42.698855, -75.252297	3623602	02628046	
Edwards	St. Lawrence	361	0.925	0.037	44.323659, -75.252926	3623635	02761297	
Eggertsville	Erie	15,561	2.851	0.001	42.966475, -78.807187	3623701	02584253	
Eldred	Sullivan	212	1.298	0.000	41.526802, -74.878829	3623811	02806963	
Elizabethtown	Essex	746	3.307	0.004	44.226239, -73.588901	3623822	02628047	
Elma Center	Erie	2,851	6.253	0.000	42.828306, -78.634286	3624141	02389037	
Elmont	Nassau	35,265	3.369	0.012	40.699176, -73.706166	3624273	02389038	
Elwood	Suffolk	11,426	4.782	0.000	40.846198, -73.338875	3624405	02389039	
Endwell	Broome	11,762	3.744	0.032	42.122864, -76.023572	3624526	02389044	
Erin	Chemung	367	0.747	0.010	42.184078, -76.671706	3624625	02632285	
Fairmount	Onondaga	10,248	3.334	0.000	43.041397, -76.248556	3625043	02389065	
Fairview	Dutchess	5,475	3.477	0.076	41.732111, -73.912391	3625109	02389069	
Fairview	Westchester	3,217	0.428	0.003	41.044190, -73.795952	3625120	02389070	
Fallsburg	Sullivan	1,862	3.370	0.044	41.738991, -74.613862	3625230	02806964	
Farmingville	Suffolk	14,983	4.124	0.000	40.838863, -73.040156	3625417	02389076	
Felts Mills	Jefferson	473	0.329	0.000	44.019950, -75.759439	3625571	02584254	
Fillmore	Allegany	596	0.816	0.000	42.466951, -78.110703	3625747	02389084	
Fire Island	Suffolk	777	9.226	29.044	40.638314, -73.202923	3625839	02389085	
Firthcliffe	Orange	5,022	2.965	0.035	41.442048, -74.033072	3625857	02389086	
Fishers Island	Suffolk	424	4.076	0.147	41.273576, -71.968993	3625923	02389087	
Fishers Landing	Jefferson	119	0.222	0.002	44.275363, -76.002914	3625934	02584255	
Flanders	Suffolk	5,098	11.461	0.174	40.885786, -72.607613	3626121	02389089	
Fly Creek	Otsego	270	1.465	0.052	42.719404, -74.984210	3626418	02804336	
Forest Home	Tompkins	1,168	0.251	0.023	42.453137, -76.471611	3626561	02389097	
Forestville	Chautauqua	704	1.056	0.000	42.468463, -79.175544	3626649	02785014	
Fort Covington	Franklin	1,127	19.351	0.010	44.971778, -74.507574	3626726	02584256	
Fort Drum	Jefferson	15,896	14.329	0.093	44.044709, -75.787763	3626759	02389105	
Fort Montgomery	Orange	1,627	1.484	0.031	41.342865, -73.987180	3626902	02389110	
Fort Salonga	Suffolk	9,652	9.829	0.111	40.903614, -73.302468	3626946	02389112	
Fowlerville	Livingston	163	0.901	0.000	42.893958, -77.848057	3627133	02584257	
Franklin Square	Nassau	30,903	2.878	0.000	40.700181, -73.677487	3627309	02389810	
Freedom Plains	Dutchess	438	1.290	0.044	41.667737, -73.797994	3627452	02584258	
Frewsburg	Chautauqua	1,843	3.373	0.015	42.056091, -79.132942	3627672	02389815	
Friendship	Allegany	1,085	2.889	0.000	42.205552, -78.141811	3627694	02389819	
Galeville	Onondaga	4,482	1.152	0.006	43.087373, -76.180784	3628035	02389823	
Gananda	Wayne	5,867	3.639	0.012	43.126168, -77.337485	3628138	02812774	
Gang Mills	Steuben	4,261	4.378	0.023	42.160378, -77.127624	3628145	02389824	
Garden City Park	Nassau	7,985	0.984	0.007	40.742930, -73.663307	3628189	02389826	
Garden City South	Nassau	4,119	0.404	0.000	40.712115, -73.660449	3628200	02389827	
Gardiner	Ulster	952	3.863	0.000	41.679517, -74.147896	3628244	02389829	
Gardnertown	Orange	4,542	4.826	0.017	41.539574, -74.057223	3628310	02389830	
Garrattsville	Otsego	120	1.426	0.000	42.652429, -75.169089	3628376	02804337	
Gasport	Niagara	1,296	2.869	0.051	43.195577, -78.576765	3628431	02389832	
Gates	Monroe	4,956	1.979	0.012	43.153353, -77.704508	3628453	02584259	
Germantown	Columbia	1121	2.679	0.016	42.135925, -73.888007	3628761	02389837	
Ghent	Columbia	623	1.538	0.011	42.325750, -73.617773	3628860	02389838	
Gilgo	Suffolk	185	4.996	6.707	40.636151, -73.383775	3628990	02584260	
Glasco	Ulster	2,013	1.762	0.683	42.045805, -73.950167	3629014	02389844	
Glen Aubrey	Broome	446	0.986	0.000	42.262282, -76.000292	3629058	02631230	
Glen Head	Nassau	4,837	1.639	0.000	40.844923, -73.618024	3629245	02389848	
Glens Falls North	Warren	9,530	8.232	0.088	43.332545, -73.679729	3629338	02389853	
Glenwood Landing	Nassau	3,948	0.972	0.000	40.829445, -73.637727	3629421	02389855	
Golden's Bridge	Westchester	1,628	2.430	0.133	41.284449, -73.672112	3629476	02389861	
Gordon Heights	Suffolk	3,981	1.705	0.014	40.863167, -72.962088	3629509	02389862	
Gorham	Ontario	604	1.897	0.000	42.799644, -77.134654	3629520	02628049	
Grahamsville	Sullivan	360	1.473	0.000	41.852751, -74.552252	3629707	02806965	
Grandyle Village	Erie	4,805	1.883	0.000	42.986853, -78.954015	3629894	02584261	
Great Bend	Jefferson	807	5.788	0.056	44.016829, -75.700166	3630136	02389866	
Great Neck Gardens	Nassau	1,268	0.171	0.000	40.796971, -73.722697	3630202	02389869	
Great River	Suffolk	2,005	4.597	0.595	40.715479, -73.161955	3630235	02389870	
Greece	Monroe	14,429	4.375	0.000	43.209518, -77.702648	3630279	02389873	
Greenlawn	Suffolk	13,661	3.722	0.003	40.864095, -73.363427	3630543	02389876	
Greenport West	Suffolk	2,282	3.209	0.125	41.090906, -72.387821	3630581	02389877	
Greenvale	Nassau	1,069	0.252	0.000	40.811948, -73.626387	3630598	02389879	
Greenville	Greene	688	3.432	0.020	42.413789, -74.020324	3630609	02389881	
Greenville	Westchester	9,394	2.562	0.035	40.998643, -73.818977	3630642	02389882	
Greigsville	Livingston	191	0.710	0.000	42.830719, -77.901429	3630807	02584262	
Groveland Station	Livingston	246	0.586	0.000	42.663379, -77.766670	3631022	02584263	
Guilford	Chenango	322	1.336	0.118	42.407337, -75.485417	3631137	02628163	
Hadley	Saratoga	1,124	1.117	0.199	43.295589, -73.829936	3631258	02584264	
Hailesboro	St. Lawrence	544	4.727	0.080	44.311552, -75.433089	3631346	02627946	
Haines Falls	Greene	249	0.755	0.000	42.196810, -74.100091	3631357	02804327	
Halesite	Suffolk	2,527	0.889	0.092	40.887100, -73.414695	3631445	02389889	
Hall	Ontario	202	1.023	0.000	42.796506, -77.067963	3631533	02628166	
Hamilton College	Oneida	1,792	0.477	0.000	43.052666, -75.407716	3631746	02806947	
Hamlin	Monroe	5,177	7.710	0.000	43.302326, -77.921794	3631786	02631636	
Hampton Bays	Suffolk	15,228	12.954	5.174	40.870270, -72.521704	3631896	02389893	
Hampton Manor	Rensselaer	5,423	2.998	0.023	42.620625, -73.730119	3631918	02389896	
Hankins	Sullivan	129	1.404	0.020	41.823158, -75.084195	3631973	02806966	
Hannawa Falls	St. Lawrence	975	5.110	0.302	44.602870, -74.973995	3632006	02627947	
Harbor Hills	Nassau	562	0.118	0.059	40.788588, -73.749019	3632094	02389898	
Harbor Isle	Nassau	1,436	0.173	0.055	40.602508, -73.664720	3632105	02389899	
Harris Hill	Erie	5,839	4.041	0.000	42.972968, -78.679273	3632391	02389903	
Harrisville	Lewis				44.152823, -75.320546	3632424	02806027	
Hartsdale	Westchester	3,377	0.895	0.000	41.015364, -73.803497	3632523	02389907	
Hartwick	Otsego	547	3.457	0.000	42.658609, -75.061109	3632578	02628169	
Hartwick Seminary	Otsego	356	1.962	0.000	42.652233, -74.960230	3632597	02804338	
Hauppauge	Suffolk	20,083	10.713	0.148	40.822162, -73.210496	3632732	02389910	
Haviland	Dutchess	4,174	3.863	0.035	41.768879, -73.899959	3632776	02389911	
Hawthorne	Westchester	4,646	1.093	0.000	41.103428, -73.796963	3632842	02389912	
Hemlock	Livingston	455	1.863	0.000	42.793788, -77.607439	3633128	02584265	
Henderson	Jefferson	233	0.506	0.000	43.847966, -76.185233	3634044	02584266	
Heritage Hills	Westchester	4,511	1.864	0.039	41.338920, -73.697898	3634118	02389917	
Hermon	St. Lawrence	436	0.492	0.000	44.467019, -75.231171	3634165	02786716	
Herricks	Nassau	4,398	0.573	0.000	40.756676, -73.663516	3634198	02389919	
Herrings	Jefferson	116	0.154	0.039	44.023285, -75.658220	3634220	02787903	
Hewlett	Nassau	7,262	0.881	0.018	40.641996, -73.694393	3634286	02389921	
Hicksville	Nassau	43,869	6.791	0.015	40.764136, -73.524806	3634374	02389922	
High Falls	Ulster	700	1.196	0.000	41.827547, -74.118478	3634451	02389923	
Highland	Ulster	6,385	4.686	0.390	41.717305, -73.964713	3634484	02389925	
Highland-on-the-Lake	Erie	3,765	2.039	0.006	42.701740, -78.982400	3634528	02812765	
Hillcrest	Rockland	8,164	1.297	0.000	41.129833, -74.035025	3634693	02389930	
Hillside	Ulster	860	0.825	0.003	41.919050, -74.033686	3634786	02389934	
Hillside Lake	Dutchess	1,091	0.523	0.040	41.615764, -73.796970	3634803	02389935	
Holbrook	Suffolk	26,487	7.183	0.000	40.794332, -73.070696	3635056	02389939	
Holland	Erie	1,173	4.004	0.000	42.637477, -78.551775	3635111	02389944	
Holtsville	Suffolk	18,937	7.113	0.000	40.812334, -73.044676	3635254	02389946	
Honeoye	Ontario	723	0.921	0.000	42.790135, -77.514793	3635353	02631231	
Hopewell Junction	Dutchess	1,330	0.742	0.001	41.580193, -73.811638	3635573	02389950	
Horseheads North	Chemung	2,761	2.211	0.029	42.196640, -76.804664	3635710	02389953	
Hortonville	Sullivan	180	0.756	0.000	41.766137, -75.022039	3635738	02584267	
Houghton	Allegany	1,488	2.479	0.010	42.428256, -78.172561	3635771	02389955	
Hunt	Livingston	62	0.119	0.000	42.547566, -77.991204	3636156	02584268	
Huntington	Suffolk	19,645	7.594	0.140	40.878126, -73.407666	3636233	02389959	
Huntington Station	Suffolk	34,878	5.474	0.004	40.844488, -73.404812	3637044	02389961	
Hurley	Ulster	3,346	5.486	0.032	41.910209, -74.062247	3637132	02389963	
Hurleyville	Sullivan	519	1.122	0.00	41.741859, -74.675357	3637154	02806967	
Hyde Park	Dutchess	1,925	1.206	0.001	41.782602, -73.934474	3637198	02584269	
Inwood	Nassau	11,340	1.581	0.483	40.621609, -73.749483	3637583	02389968	
Irondequoit	Monroe	51,043	15.001	1.833	43.209811, -77.572056	3637737	02389971	
Islip	Suffolk	18,418	4.800	0.119	40.735467, -73.216395	3637869	02389974	
Islip Terrace	Suffolk	5,323	1.347	0.000	40.750597, -73.187174	3638022	02389975	
Jacksonville	Tompkins	516	3.608	0.011	42.506099, -76.618788	3638209	02806981	
Jamesport	Suffolk	1,609	4.496	0.027	40.961451, -72.583379	3638253	02389977	
Jamestown West	Chautauqua	2,652	2.517	0.000	42.088508, -79.281097	3638275	02389978	
Jefferson	Schoharie	121	1.065	0.003	42.478170, -74.603324	3638429	02806959	
Jefferson Heights	Greene	1,122	1.476	0.021	42.235642, -73.882099	3638451	02389982	
Jefferson Valley-Yorktown	Westchester	14,444	6.926	0.096	41.319935, -73.801118	3638500	02389983	
Jericho	Nassau	14,808	3.943	0.016	40.786045, -73.541253	3638539	02389984	
Katonah	Westchester	1,603	0.725	0.079	41.255069, -73.685185	3638946	02585492	
Kauneonga Lake	Sullivan	305	1.145	0.192	41.689261, -74.833098	3638985; 3638990; 3638995	02806969; 02807395	
Keeseville	Clinton & Essex	2,931	6.020	0.111	44.504740, -73.482094	3639089	02772073	
Kennedy	Chautauqua	473	2.035	0.000	42.158895, -79.098270	3639243	02628170	
Kerhonkson	Ulster	1,722	5.277	0.018	41.779391, -74.295611	3639397	02389999	
Keuka Park	Yates	1,130	0.678	0.559	42.612792, -77.091664	3639463	02631232	
Kiamesha Lake	Sullivan	320	1.020	0.299	41.680772, -74.668631	3639485	02806970	
Kings Park	Suffolk	17,085	6.199	0.391	40.886865, -73.245725	3639672	02390002	
Kysorville	Livingston	104	0.827	0.000	42.652783, -77.794911	3640175	02584270	
La Fargeville	Jefferson	537	3.318	0.055	44.195094, -75.963717	3640233	02390010	
Lake Carmel	Putnam	8,069	5.161	0.333	41.461177, -73.667877	3640398	02390014	
Lake Delta	Oneida	2,757	3.347	1.071	43.286754, -75.469092	3640475	02806948	
Lake Erie Beach	Erie	3,467	3.820	0.000	42.624184, -79.078573	3640486	02390015	
Lake Huntington	Sullivan	283	1.195	0.141	41.680039, -74.994190	3640552	02806971	
Lake Katrine	Ulster	2,522	2.254	0.040	41.985218, -73.989759	3640585	02390017	
Lake Luzerne	Warren	1,336	2.508	0.369	43.324809, -73.837711	3640648	02584271	
Lake Mohegan	Westchester	5,896	2.876	0.199	41.311743, -73.847463	3640689	02390021	
Lake Ronkonkoma	Suffolk	18,619	4.940	0.003	40.830438, -73.111750	3640838	02390024	
Lakeland	Onondaga	2,556	1.483	0.000	43.090869, -76.242610	3640607	02390028	
Lakeview	Nassau	6,077	1.000	0.195	40.677732, -73.649718	3641003	02390030	
Lakeville	Livingston	694	0.667	0.000	42.836761, -77.703154	3641036	02584272	
Latham	Albany	13,680	5.782	0.016	42.742235, -73.750377	3641399	02812763	
Laurel	Suffolk	1,495	3.000	0.074	40.971576, -72.555967	3641465	02390036	
Leeds	Greene	429	0.529	0.009	42.249947, -73.892927	3641784	02390049	
Levittown	Nassau	51,758	6.811	0.025	40.723990, -73.512709	3642081	02390060	
Lido Beach	Nassau	2,719	1.739	2.487	40.589098, -73.604318	3642279	02390063	
Lime Lake	Cattaraugus	836	2.378	0.266	42.433004, -78.484671	3642345	02584273	
Limestone	Cattaraugus	358	1.689	0.010	42.017267, -78.631327	3642378	02678893	
Lincoln Park	Ulster	2,545	1.434	0.030	41.958041, -74.004812	3642488	02390068	
Lincolndale	Westchester	1,504	0.958	0.041	41.333476, -73.724776	3642455	02390069	
Linwood	Livingston	84	0.929	0.000	42.896705, -77.947602	3642609	02584274	
Livingston Manor	Sullivan	1,053	3.081	0.012	41.887164, -74.823643	3642928	02390083	
Livonia Center	Livingston	417	0.817	0.000	42.821060, -77.642011	3642972	02584275	
Loch Sheldrake	Sullivan	1,025	16.341	1.247	41.775216, -74.659650	3643038	02675337	
Locust Valley	Nassau	3,571	0.914	0.023	40.878116, -73.588830	3643192	02390086	
Long Lake	Hamilton	596	11.721	2.209	43.956930, -74.446518	3643401	02628176	
Lorenz Park	Columbia	2,001	1.784	0.163	42.269481, -73.776192	3643511	02390092	
Lorraine	Jefferson	139	0.483	0.000	43.765557, -75.952276	3643533	02584276	
Loudonville	Albany	10,296	4.963	0.065	42.709730, -73.763079	3643566	02812761	
Lyncourt	Onondaga	4,376	1.243	0.000	43.082032, -76.126268	3643885	02390100	
Lyon Mountain	Clinton	421	10.147	0.000	44.724970, -73.882357	3643951	02390104	
Lyons	Wayne	3,989	4.613	0.077	43.063370, -76.993384	3643962	02784107	
MacDonnell Heights	Dutchess	1,291	1.471	0.005	41.724640, -73.860112	3644105	02806927	
Macedon	Wayne	2,092	2.176	0.029	43.068813, -77.302503	3644149	02791459	
Machias	Cattaraugus	505	0.865	0.167	42.413621, -78.487052	3644226	02584277	
Madrid	St. Lawrence	736	3.727	0.133	44.747381, -75.129351	3644479	02627948	
Mahopac	Putnam	8,932	5.279	1.171	41.367091, -73.741535	3644534	02390109	
Malden-on-Hudson	Ulster	365	0.501	0.000	42.093226, -73.936475	3644677	02390111	
Malverne Park Oaks	Nassau	538	0.130	0.000	40.681654, -73.664414	3644792	02390113	
Manhasset	Nassau	8,176	2.382	0.034	40.784977, -73.694880	3644897	02390115	
Manhasset Hills	Nassau	3,649	0.591	0.000	40.759137, -73.680870	3644908	02390116	
Manorville	Suffolk	14,317	25.469	0.042	40.862155, -72.787337	3645139	02390117	
Marcy	Oneida	650	1.718	0.112	43.131447, -75.255714	3645524	02806949	
Mariaville Lake	Schenectady	666	5.623	0.380	42.824870, -74.130220	3645573	02390121	
Marion	Wayne	1,432	3.053	0.006	43.141993, -77.194037	3645634	02631642	
Marist College	Dutchess	2,894	0.261	0.000	41.722227, -73.933341	3645659	02806928	
Marlboro	Ulster	3,699	4.456	0.636	41.603811, -73.977152	3645700	02390122	
Massapequa	Nassau	21,355	3.558	0.436	40.668302, -73.471515	3645986	02390130	
Mastic	Suffolk	15,404	3.897	0.085	40.810407, -72.847582	3646074	02390132	
Mastic Beach	Suffolk	14,199	4.898	1.105	40.767592, -72.837558	3646085	02390131	
Mattituck	Suffolk	4,322	8.996	0.364	41.000401, -72.541176	3646140	02390134	
Mattydale	Onondaga	6,296	1.920	0.000	43.099176, -76.138830	3646151	02390135	
McLean	Tompkins	378	0.232	0.003	42.548809, -76.292316	3644358	02806982	
Mechanicstown	Orange	8,065	3.345	0.056	41.450288, -74.389639	3646349	02389465	
Medford	Suffolk	24,247	10.797	0.000	40.821991, -72.985948	3646404	02389468	
Melrose Park	Cayuga	2,141	3.732	0.584	42.905646, -76.514049	3646503	02389470	
Melville	Suffolk	19,284	12.086	0.000	40.783021, -73.405619	3646514	02389471	
Merrick	Nassau	22,040	4.019	1.133	40.651637, -73.551927	3646668	02389474	
Merritt Park	Dutchess	1,647	0.444	0.000	41.538472, -73.872420	3646750	02584278	
Middle Island	Suffolk	10,546	8.239	0.059	40.885746, -72.945485	3646976	02389478	
Miller Place	Suffolk	11,723	6.552	0.000	40.937308, -72.986342	3647306	02389485	
Millwood	Westchester	1,081	0.602	0.005	41.202753, -73.793047	3647482	02806987	
Milton	Saratoga	4,663	1.487	0.005	43.037343, -73.853896	3647548	02389487	
Milton	Ulster	1,650	2.962	0.049	41.656220, -73.969625	3647554	02389488	
Minetto	Oswego	1,262	3.323	0.263	43.402400, -76.482159	3647680	02389490	
Mineville	Essex	1,327	3.702	0.006	44.092956, -73.521546	3647702	02585493	
Mongaup Valley	Sullivan	236	5.016	0.081	41.680325, -74.779887	3647977	02806972	
Monsey	Rockland	26,954	2.273	0.014	41.109477, -74.076972	3648010	02389494	
Montauk	Suffolk	4,318	17.479	2.252	41.047252, -71.945292	3648054	02389495	
Montrose	Westchester	2,862	1.614	0.052	41.244828, -73.938334	3648208	02585494	
Mooers	Clinton	451	1.193	0.038	44.963630, -73.595463	3648241	02389503	
Moriches	Suffolk	3,026	2.050	0.227	40.805396, -72.826868	3648450	02389506	
Morristown	St. Lawrence	398	0.982	0.039	44.584177, -75.645331	3648571	02830135	(Note: Morristown was listed as a village in the 2020 Census, despite its dissolution on December 31, 2019, with a GNIS ID of 02390997)
Morrisonville	Clinton	1,893	2.611	0.090	44.690235, -73.551625	3648538	02389507	
Mount Ivy	Rockland	7,657	1.467	0.000	41.192664, -74.029583	3648879	02389513	
Mount Sinai	Suffolk	11,623	5.999	0.419	40.943264, -73.021937	3649066	02389517	
Mount Vision	Otsego	171	1.514	0.000	42.583077, -75.051728	3649143	02804339	
Mountain Dale	Sullivan	633	5.793	0.030	41.691253, -74.520578	3648736	02806973	
Mountain Lodge Park	Orange	1,910	1.185	0.000	41.386326, -74.138791	3648750	02631233	
Munsons Corners	Cortland	2,814	2.219	0.010	42.573807, -76.202102	3649242	02389523	
Myers Corner	Dutchess	10,598	5.017	0.039	41.598119, -73.873148	3649363	02389524	
Nanuet	Rockland	18,886	5.433	0.005	41.095556, -74.015396	3649407	02389526	
Napanoch	Ulster	1,131	1.220	0.025	41.754001, -74.371700	3649418	02389527	
Napeague	Suffolk	368	3.678	0.080	40.994468, -72.074704	3649424	02389528	
Narrowsburg	Sullivan	379	1.366	0.134	41.596136, -75.055120	3649473	02389529	
Nassau Lake	Rensselaer	1,004	1.522	0.274	42.538613, -73.609136	3649555	02812769	
Natural Bridge	Jefferson	296	1.389	0.000	44.071678, -75.499799	3649605	02389530	
Nazareth College	Monroe	1,182	0.219	0.000	43.103104, -77.519349	3649715	02806943	
Nedrow	Onondaga	2,095	0.959	0.000	42.978021, -76.141706	3649726	02389533	
Nesconset	Suffolk	13,207	3.821	0.003	40.846855, -73.152008	3649825	02389535	
New Baltimore	Greene	546	1.757	0.269	42.453111, -73.797581	3649924	02804328	
New Cassel	Nassau	14,199	1.479	0.000	40.760049, -73.564891	3650067	02389538	
New City	Rockland	34,135	15.582	0.793	41.153076, -73.990253	3650100	02389540	
New Hackensack	Dutchess	1,497	2.075	0.003	41.619623, -73.860006	3650265	02812764	
New Hamburg	Dutchess	842	0.480	0.192	41.588583, -73.941204	3650276	02806929	
New Suffolk	Suffolk	403	0.556	0.054	40.996754, -72.477472	3650727	02389544	
New Windsor	Orange	8,882	3.762	0.042	41.469830, -74.031832	3650837	02389545	
Newfane	Niagara	3,662	5.303	0.000	43.285683, -78.693945	3650221	02389548	
Newfield	Tompkins	725	1.257	0.001	42.357511, -76.593810	3650243	02389549	
Niagara University	Niagara	940	0.231	0.000	43.137212, -79.035127	3651088	02806946	
Niskayuna	Schenectady	20,787	11.876	0.458	42.804896, -73.887427	3651275	02389554	
Niverville	Columbia	1,508	2.874	0.545	42.449226, -73.648775	3651297	02389555	
Norfolk	St. Lawrence	1,238	2.702	0.112	44.788637, -74.988027	3651319	02389558	
North Amityville	Suffolk	18,643	2.354	0.000	40.700427, -73.411780	3651396	02389559	
North Babylon	Suffolk	17,927	3.370	0.053	40.729957, -73.326213	3651440	02389560	
North Ballston Spa	Saratoga	1,376	0.824	0.004	43.019756, -73.850346	3651467	02389561	
North Bay	Oneida	374	1.115	0.201	43.228451, -75.744440	3651484	02806950	
North Bay Shore	Suffolk	19,619	3.252	0.000	40.760039, -73.261772	3651495	02389562	
North Bellmore	Nassau	20,583	2.620	0.000	40.690346, -73.539016	3651517	02389564	
North Bellport	Suffolk	11,900	4.936	0.000	40.786894, -72.945562	3651528	02389565	
North Blenheim	Schoharie	54	0.452	0.000	42.471810, -74.452558	3651561	02806960	
North Boston	Erie	2,529	4.074	0.000	42.677320, -78.779633	3651583	02389567	
North Creek	Warren	562	1.595	0.051	43.691282, -73.985525	3651847	02631632	
North Gates	Monroe	9,458	2.662	0.026	43.171506, -77.706853	3652040	02584279	
North Granville	Washington	524	1.041	0.000	43.451516, -73.358092	3652067	02812773	
North Great River	Suffolk	4,266	2.325	0.023	40.756197, -73.163100	3652078	02389570	
North Lindenhurst	Suffolk	12,000	1.920	0.000	40.707182, -73.385970	3653198	02389573	
North Lynbrook	Nassau	747	0.087	0.000	40.668563, -73.673588	3653231	02389574	
North Massapequa	Nassau	17,829	2.995	0.005	40.703007, -73.469122	3653253	02389575	
North Merrick	Nassau	12,238	1.719	0.007	40.688369, -73.560577	3653264	02389576	
North New Hyde Park	Nassau	15,657	1.973	0.022	40.745779, -73.687778	3653275	02389578	
North Patchogue	Suffolk	6,751	1.978	0.052	40.784034, -73.023889	3653319	02389579	
North Rose	Wayne	571	1.690	0.000	43.187220, -76.886401	3653462	02631641	
North Sea	Suffolk	5,461	11.052	1.041	40.931122, -72.406050	3653561	02389582	
North Valley Stream	Nassau	18,197	1.864	0.033	40.684307, -73.708033	3653748	02389586	
North Wantagh	Nassau	11,931	1.902	0.009	40.693878, -73.516360	3653792	02389589	
Northampton	Suffolk	763	11.551	0.100	40.875817, -72.684606	3651418	02389590	
Northeast Ithaca	Tompkins	2,701	1.469	0.004	42.468570, -76.463401	3651915	02389591	
Northville	Suffolk	1,566	7.404	0.021	40.975572, -72.630246	3653775	02389592	
Northwest Harbor	Suffolk	4,637	14.473	1.580	41.001728, -72.222953	3653852	02389593	
Northwest Ithaca	Tompkins	2,231	2.908	0.662	42.471183, -76.542685	3653853	02389595	
Noyack	Suffolk	4,325	8.404	0.322	40.978485, -72.346015	3654056	02389596	
Oak Beach	Suffolk	268	1.143	2.162	40.650796, -73.272514	3654111	02584280	
Oakdale	Suffolk	7,430	3.417	0.394	40.737986, -73.134420	3654144	02389603	
Oceanside	Nassau	32,637	4.944	0.473	40.633020, -73.637701	3654441	02389611	
Olcott	Niagara	1,072	4.547	0.744	43.330670, -78.704768	3654540	02389614	
Old Bethpage	Nassau	6,403	4.361	0.004	40.750828, -73.458387	3654551	02389615	
Old Forge	Herkimer	727	1.786	0.178	43.706412, -74.969214	3654639	02631633	
Ontario	Wayne	2,215	3.796	0.000	43.217635, -77.279334	3655002	02631644	
Orange Lake	Orange	9,770	6.044	0.656	41.535964, -74.094267	3655189	02389623	
Orangeburg	Rockland	4,565	3.073	0.000	41.048736, -73.940835	3655167	02389624	
Orient	Suffolk	999	5.122	1.032	41.144799, -72.255347	3655321	02389627	
Otter Lake	Oneida	109	0.472	0.232	43.592726, -75.117364	3655750	02806951	
Oxbow	Jefferson	85	0.202	0.000	44.286909, -75.622546	3655937	02584281	
Oyster Bay	Nassau	7,049	1.233	0.370	40.868057, -73.531053	3655992	02389634	
Palenville	Greene	1,002	3.325	0.009	42.185728, -74.028971	3656132	02389635	
Pamelia Center	Jefferson	471	1.041	0.000	44.040937, -75.901631	3656212	02584282	
Parc	Clinton	197	1.231	0.000	44.663830, -73.452953	3656291	02389640	
Parishville	St. Lawrence	642	3.292	0.067	44.629716, -74.792731	3656363	02627949	
Paul Smiths	Franklin	411	0.255	0.135	44.432387, -74.249338	3656770	02631629	
Pavilion	Genesee	664	3.312	0.000	42.879399, -78.022039	3656781	02628177	
Peach Lake	Putnam & Westchester	1,885	2.664	0.380	41.366952, -73.576503	3656869	02389652	
Pearl River	Rockland	16,567	6.799	0.400	41.061561, -74.007832	3656902	02389653	
Peconic	Suffolk	692	3.380	0.126	41.039067, -72.464419	3656968	02389654	
Perrysburg	Cattaraugus	346	0.983	0.004	42.458422, -79.001067	3657287	02745368	
Peru	Clinton	1,843	1.590	0.000	44.578950, -73.534112	3657364	02389665	
Phoenicia	Ulster	268	0.456	0.000	42.083154, -74.314328	3657650	02389666	
Pierrepont Manor	Jefferson	212	0.684	0.004	43.738846, -76.062967	3657782	02584283	
Piffard	Livingston	208	0.934	0.000	42.831854, -77.858397	3657804	02584284	
Pike	Wyoming	298	1.494	0.001	42.553994, -78.147560	3657815	02628178	
Pine Bush	Orange	1,751	2.106	0.003	41.609545, -74.296524	3657980	02389671	
Pine Hill	Ulster	275	2.078	0.010	42.132857, -74.473801	3658057	02389674	
Pine Plains	Dutchess	1,142	2.078	0.224	41.977691, -73.658200	3658145	02389675	
Pine Valley	Chemung	832	1.204	0.014	42.230281, -76.848036	3658189	02631234	
Plainedge	Nassau	9,517	1.404	0.000	40.724010, -73.476994	3658409	02389678	
Plainview	Nassau	27,100	5.733	0.011	40.781700, -73.473035	3658442	02389681	
Plattekill	Ulster	1,296	2.550	0.073	41.619772, -74.058675	3658541	02389682	
Plattsburgh West	Clinton	1,382	1.774	0.055	44.683099, -73.502531	3658601	02389683	
Pleasant Valley	Dutchess	1,603	0.934	0.025	41.746266, -73.826294	3658684	02389687	
Plessis	Jefferson	126	0.346	0.000	44.273537, -75.857487	3658739	02584285	
Poestenkill	Rensselaer	1,020	5.876	0.066	42.696684, -73.540064	3658794	02389691	
Point Lookout	Nassau	1,527	0.226	0.000	40.590326, -73.579456	3658849	02389692	
Port Ewen	Ulster	3,678	1.973	0.653	41.904162, -73.977243	3659311	02389694	
Port Gibson	Ontario	405	1.171	0.032	43.034372, -77.156819	3659322	02628179	
Port Henry	Essex	1,150	1.391	0.338	44.046771, -73.461105	3659333	02786718	
Port Jefferson Station	Suffolk	7,950	2.666	0.000	40.925952, -73.065039	3659377	02389695	
Port Washington	Nassau	16,753	4.185	1.429	40.827452, -73.680008	3659520	02389700	
Portlandville	Otsego	177	0.230	0.005	42.537000, -74.963157	3659443	02804340	
Pottersville	Warren	359	2.279	0.047	43.737987, -73.821517	3659619	02631631	
Prattsburgh	Steuben	589	1.640	0.000	42.524795, -77.288316	3659708	02631235	
Prattsville	Greene	384	4.038	0.000	42.347243, -74.428721	3659740	02628181	
Preston-Potter Hollow	Albany	367	10.134	0.000	42.433039, -74.228758	3659831	02389706	
Prospect	Oneida	248	0.430	0.012	43.304975, -75.150720	3659883	02784077	
Pultneyville	Wayne	817	2.242	0.000	43.273718, -77.172372	3659993	02631637	
Putnam Lake	Putnam	3,776	3.841	0.419	41.474832, -73.548908	3660103	02389714	
Quiogue	Suffolk	1,013	1.258	0.430	40.819696, -72.628150	3660411	02389720	
Radisson	Onondaga	7,038	2.989	0.100	43.184659, -76.292509	3660455	02806957	
Randolph	Cattaraugus	1,297	3.251	0.011	42.162290, -78.979690	3660576	02746455	
Ransomville	Niagara	1,316	6.243	0.000	43.238847, -78.911378	3660598	02389726	
Rapids	Niagara	1,584	3.644	0.000	43.097626, -78.644065	3660609	02389727	
Red Oaks Mill	Dutchess	3,810	2.276	0.031	41.650959, -73.873444	3660983	02389733	
Redford	Clinton	387	1.347	0.108	44.606489, -73.808945	3660884	02389734	
Redwood	Jefferson	493	2.021	0.534	44.298188, -75.807880	3661016	02389736	
Remsenburg-Speonk	Suffolk	3,110	3.602	0.081	40.816233, -72.705765	3661142	02389741	
Retsof	Livingston	326	0.451	0.000	42.832436, -77.875748	3661236	02584286	
Rhinecliff	Dutchess	380	0.994	0.014	41.924369, -73.941058	3661368	02584287	
Ridge	Suffolk	13,271	13.211	0.093	40.901497, -72.885405	3661665	02389750	
Rifton	Ulster	481	1.175	0.000	41.828723, -74.038052	3661797	02389751	
Ripley	Chautauqua	852	1.372	0.000	42.265687, -79.712302	3661874	02389753	
Riverhead	Suffolk	14,993	15.082	0.305	40.949476, -72.675229	3661973	02389757	
Riverside	Suffolk	2,882	2.717	0.113	40.906601, -72.674102	3662066	02389759	
Rochester Institute of Technology	Monroe	7,322	1.982	0.007	43.084746, -77.672777	3663014	02806944	
Rock Hill	Sullivan	2,369	3.657	0.946	41.608746, -74.584322	3663132	02389765	
Rocky Point	Suffolk	13,633	11.298	0.000	40.935745, -72.936391	3663319	02389766	
Rodman	Jefferson	152	0.116	0.000	43.851246, -75.940557	3663330	02584288	
Roessleville	Albany	11,518	4.026	0.007	42.696899, -73.795480	3663363	02812762	
Romulus	Seneca	356	0.609	0.000	42.751799, -76.835069	3663429	02628183	
Ronkonkoma	Suffolk	18,955	7.833	0.332	40.803296, -73.126125	3663473	02389770	
Roosevelt	Nassau	18,066	1.770	0.010	40.679422, -73.583372	3663506	02389771	
Roscoe	Sullivan	497	0.718	0.002	41.933791, -74.916099	3663583	02389773	
Rosendale	Ulster	1,285	1.904	0.055	41.853172, -74.071420	3663725	02389777	
Roslyn Heights	Nassau	6,747	1.476	0.000	40.778751, -73.639597	3663814	02389779	
Rotterdam	Schenectady	22,968	6.933	0.006	42.778495, -73.953995	3663924	02389786	
Round Top	Greene	920	8.752	0.029	42.260675, -74.031311	3663968	02804329	
Ruby	Ulster	918	1.676	0.001	42.014294, -74.009376	3664056	02812772	
Rushford	Allegany	351	0.559	0.000	42.389023, -78.252304	3664155	02628184	
Saddle Rock Estates	Nassau	428	0.078	0.000	40.793964, -73.741490	3664441	02389794	
Salem	Washington	811	2.933	0.000	43.172673, -73.326450	3664771	02785015	
Salisbury	Nassau	12,618	1.737	0.024	40.745822, -73.560330	3664842	02389795	
Salisbury Center	Herkimer	323	0.915	0.003	43.141658, -74.775851	3664848	02806941	
Salisbury Mills	Orange	580	0.499	0.005	41.432323, -74.106274	3664859	02584289	
Salt Point	Dutchess	202	0.829	0.004	41.807806, -73.788026	3664892	02584290	
Sanborn	Niagara	1,553	2.633	0.000	43.145054, -78.877748	3664958	02631646	
Sand Ridge	Oswego	992	2.399	0.036	43.258696, -76.243426	3665024	02389801	
Saugerties South	Ulster	2,442	0.953	0.210	42.057887, -73.948804	3665310	02390256	
Savannah	Wayne	487	1.180	0.000	43.066711, -76.759545	3665332	02631236	
Sayville	Suffolk	16,569	5.289	0.065	40.747637, -73.085326	3665409	02390258	
Schenevus	Otsego	494	1.029	0.000	42.549673, -74.826932	3665519	02390260	
Schroon Lake	Essex	921	2.886	0.799	43.835063, -73.766919	3665640	02631630	
Schuyler Lake	Otsego	189	3.236	0.000	42.778647, -75.033516	3665739	02804341	
Scio	Allegany	525	1.352	0.000	42.173414, -77.979656	3665761	02628186	
Scotchtown	Orange	10,578	4.226	0.012	41.474901, -74.368078	3665882	02390264	
Scotts Corners	Westchester	665	1.773	0.000	41.188877, -73.556069	3665948	02390266	
Scottsburg	Livingston	137	0.164	0.000	42.663823, -77.712307	3665926	02584291	
Seaford	Nassau	15,251	2.611	0.054	40.667790, -73.491831	3666058	02390268	
Searingtown	Nassau	5,044	0.929	0.000	40.770430, -73.660333	3666102	02390269	
Selden	Suffolk	21,262	4.321	0.000	40.870022, -73.046188	3666212	02390271	
Seneca Falls	Seneca	6,809	4.687	0.157	42.909180, -76.798951	3666322	02746310	
Seneca Knolls	Onondaga	1,992	1.248	0.000	43.119964, -76.287317	3666366	02390275	
Setauket	Suffolk	3,986	2.518	0.760	40.948858, -73.115085	3666465	02805099	
Shelter Island	Suffolk	1,602	6.549	0.142	41.055701, -72.316976	3666828	02390288	
Shelter Island Heights	Suffolk	1,601	5.370	0.279	41.066842, -72.368991	3666850	02390289	
Shenorock	Westchester	1,903	0.700	0.029	41.330331, -73.740565	3666872	02390291	
Shinnecock Hills	Suffolk	2,282	2.839	0.201	40.888057, -72.455687	3667048	02390295	
Shirley	Suffolk	26,360	11.455	0.432	40.795503, -72.873566	3667070	02390296	
Shokan	Ulster	1,075	3.891	0.000	41.980915, -74.212963	3667081	02390297	
Shorehaven	Dutchess	686	1.370	0.430	41.560698, -73.664134	3667207	02806931	
Shrub Oak	Westchester	2,143	1.580	0.027	41.328528, -73.829416	3667279	02390299	
Siena College	Albany	2,281	0.246	0.000	42.719000, -73.750045	3667367	02806921	
Slaterville Springs	Tompkins	208	0.263	0.000	42.397268, -76.344394	3667631	02806983	
Sleepy Hollow Lake	Greene	1,153	2.158	0.399	42.303597, -73.810564	3667640	02804330	
Smallwood	Sullivan	839	1.505	0.118	41.662176, -74.821813	3667730	02390307	
Smithtown	Suffolk	25,629	11.629	0.485	40.863410, -73.224444	3667851	02390309	
Smithville Flats	Chenango	303	1.422	0.000	42.394324, -75.810584	3668088	02628187	
Sound Beach	Suffolk	7,416	1.637	0.000	40.957875, -72.972479	3668374	02390313	
South Cairo	Greene	590	2.854	0.004	42.262845, -73.956149	3668737	02804332	
South Edmeston	Otsego	137	0.936	0.000	42.685431, -75.311370	3668946	02804345	
South Fallsburg	Sullivan	2,347	5.947	0.155	41.725760, -74.635186	3668968	02390314	
South Farmingdale	Nassau	14,345	2.218	0.004	40.716625, -73.447915	3669001	02390315	
South Hempstead	Nassau	3,406	0.578	0.000	40.681341, -73.623335	3669188	02390317	
South Hill	Tompkins	7,245	5.896	0.094	42.411477, -76.493761	3669199	02390318	
South Huntington	Suffolk	9,561	3.409	0.000	40.822511, -73.392207	3669254	02390319	
South Ilion	Herkimer	119	0.439	0.004	42.993863, -75.055038	3669265	02806942	
South Lansing	Tompkins	1,078	2.761	0.003	42.532462, -76.496336	3669342	02806984	
South Lima	Livingston	269	0.883	0.000	42.857448, -77.676012	3669364	02584292	
South Lockport	Niagara	9,355	5.714	0.014	43.137383, -78.682773	3669386	02390322	
South Valley Stream	Nassau	6,386	0.873	0.000	40.655775, -73.718564	3669892	02390326	
Southold	Suffolk	6,040	10.465	0.855	41.059912, -72.427282	3669452	02390327	
Southport	Chemung	6,782	6.377	0.239	42.064682, -76.822465	3669606	02390328	
Spackenkill	Dutchess	4,223	1.775	0.001	41.654009, -73.911367	3670035	02390329	
Sparkill	Rockland	1,581	0.529	0.000	41.028908, -73.933288	3670068	02631237	
Sparrow Bush	Orange	981	2.808	0.071	41.400880, -74.707933	3670090	02812767	
Springfield Center	Otsego	336	4.813	0.009	42.835029, -74.872142	3670321	02804342	
Springs	Suffolk	8,086	8.479	0.757	41.024024, -72.166090	3670387	02390342	
Springwater	Livingston	518	1.331	0.000	42.634990, -77.596423	3670464	02584293	
St. Bonaventure	Cattaraugus	1,963	1.976	0.152	42.079480, -78.474257	3664551	02390344	
St. James	Suffolk	13,487	4.559	0.001	40.876403, -73.152102	3664584	02390347	
St. John Fisher College	Monroe	1,307	0.240	0.000	43.114276, -77.510747	3664606	02806945	
St. Regis Falls	Franklin	432	1.292	0.000	44.676385, -74.530951	3664716	02628185	
Staatsburg	Dutchess	703	1.065	0.001	41.853260, -73.922242	3670552	02390350	
Stannards	Allegany	585	2.797	0.000	42.074121, -77.912279	3670717	02390353	
Star Lake	St. Lawrence	631	4.338	0.426	44.169532, -75.038902	3670849	02390354	
Stittville	Oneida	294	0.490	0.017	43.225129, -75.288486	3671377	02806952	
Stone Ridge	Ulster	1,234	5.190	0.040	41.846722, -74.154549	3671597	02390357	
Stony Brook	Suffolk	13,467	5.815	0.139	40.905957, -73.127374	3671608	02390358	
Stony Brook University	Suffolk	10,409	1.697	0.000	40.909852, -73.121451	3671620	02611713	
Stony Point	Rockland	12,126	5.442	1.293	41.229379, -73.997646	3671663	02390359	
Stottville	Columbia	1,665	4.179	0.030	42.293715, -73.760817	3671718	02390362	
Strykersville	Wyoming	682	3.420	0.000	42.708011, -78.448374	3671817	02628188	
Sunset Bay	Chautauqua	470	0.661	0.044	42.561440, -79.129749	3672246	02631238	
SUNY Oswego	Oswego	3,451	0.324	0.302	43.456254, -76.541875	3672327	02631635	
Swan Lake	Sullivan	372	1.711	0.218	41.760828, -74.783428	3672400	02806974	
Syosset	Nassau	19,259	4.974	0.000	40.815679, -73.502028	3672554	02390376	
Taconic Shores	Columbia	547	2.154	0.488	42.116119, -73.555178	3673057	02761351	
Tappan	Rockland	6,673	2.771	0.006	41.025541, -73.951396	3673154	02390377	
Terryville	Suffolk	11,472	3.213	0.000	40.908995, -73.049132	3673352	02390382	
Thendara	Herkimer	195	1.444	0.073	43.703769, -74.996900	3673495	02676039	
Thiells	Rockland	5,240	1.827	0.031	41.204501, -74.012618	3673583	02390383	
Thornwood	Westchester	3,960	1.107	0.000	41.118687, -73.779372	3673715	02390386	
Thousand Island Park	Jefferson	96	0.293	0.000	44.288621, -76.025740	3673726	02584294	
Three Mile Bay	Jefferson	187	0.257	0.000	44.083197, -76.197882	3673737	02584295	
Ticonderoga	Essex	3,250	4.272	0.079	43.840893, -73.422731	3673880	02390387	
Tillson	Ulster	1,516	2.345	0.024	41.830766, -74.072432	3673902	02390389	
Tioga Terrace	Tioga	2,082	1.002	0.000	42.050714, -76.119745	3673990	02806978	
Titusville	Dutchess	729	0.691	0.001	41.665846, -73.867477	3674017	02584296	
Tonawanda Town	Erie	57,431	17.300	1.336	42.985114, -78.875755	3674183	02390395	
Town Line	Erie	2,334	4.622	0.004	42.886773, -78.567244	3675121	02390398	
Tribes Hill	Montgomery	937	2.276	0.135	42.949103, -74.298921	3675341	02390405	
Tuckahoe	Suffolk	1,505	4.140	0.458	40.903533, -72.435547	3675572	02390408	
Tuscarora	Livingston	71	0.093	0.000	42.634502, -77.869416	3675726	02584297	
Unadilla Forks	Otsego	257	4.987	0.000	42.849625, -75.230860	3676023	02804343	
Uniondale	Nassau	32,473	5.710	0.000	40.701950, -73.590905	3676089	02390417	
University at Buffalo	Erie	6,798	1.373	0.089	42.998382, -78.791705	3676280	02631239	
University Gardens	Nassau	4,358	0.533	0.000	40.775173, -73.727963	3676287	02390418	
Upper Red Hook	Dutchess	180	0.200	0.000	42.026142, -73.845587	3676397	02806932	
Vails Gate	Orange	3,368	1.061	0.000	41.458600, -74.053695	3676584	02390422	
Valhalla	Westchester	3,213	0.830	0.000	41.077677, -73.778055	3676639	02390423	
Valley Cottage	Rockland	9,038	4.309	0.023	41.115488, -73.943527	3676661	02390424	
Van Etten	Chemung	601	1.279	0.002	42.196944, -76.553541	3676881	02804710	
Varna	Tompkins	767	0.713	0.003	42.452575, -76.438209	3676969	02806985	
Vassar College	Dutchess	2,472	0.719	0.009	41.687075, -73.892305	3676985	02806933	
Verona	Oneida	828	1.878	0.000	43.136750, -75.571694	3677167	02631639	
Verplanck	Westchester	1,535	0.622	0.104	41.256258, -73.959177	3677211	02390432	
Village Green	Onondaga	3,834	1.154	0.008	43.133128, -76.313518	3677513	02390435	
Viola	Rockland	8,208	2.678	0.001	41.131517, -74.081692	3677574	02390440	
Virgil	Cortland	298	2.315	0.000	42.514147, -76.200090	3677585	02628189	
Wading River	Suffolk	7,731	9.803	0.039	40.947365, -72.823565	3677772	02390442	
Wadsworth	Livingston	173	0.512	0.000	42.821447, -77.893876	3677783	02584298	
Wainscott	Suffolk	904	6.728	0.496	40.958148, -72.254084	3677805	02390443	
Walker Valley	Ulster	1,269	2.120	0.010	41.643403, -74.380777	3677948	02390446	
Wallkill	Ulster	2,166	3.067	0.000	41.608446, -74.164625	3678003	02390448	
Walton Park	Orange	3,907	2.329	0.348	41.310747, -74.225322	3678063	02390449	
Walworth	Wayne	917	1.466	0.000	43.139630, -77.279239	3678091	02812775	
Wanakah	Erie	3,137	1.204	0.000	42.743635, -78.902497	3678124	02584299	
Wantagh	Nassau	18,613	3.830	0.297	40.669351, -73.510255	3678146	02390451	
Warrensburg	Warren	3,045	11.028	0.319	43.520351, -73.772583	3678289	02390455	
Washington Heights	Orange	2,205	1.486	0.005	41.469563, -74.417415	3678421	02390457	
Washington Mills	Oneida	1,219	0.670	0.000	43.047930, -75.281049	3678454	02584300	
Wassaic	Dutchess	210	0.355	0.000	41.806453, -73.559306	3678476	02806934	
Watchtower	Ulster	1,709	0.777	0.000	41.637060, -74.263278	3678487	02631240	
Water Mill	Suffolk	2,506	10.541	1.483	40.922393, -72.350704	3678575	02390459	
Websters Crossing	Livingston	52	0.110	0.000	42.666093, -77.636792	3678982	02584301	
Wells	Hamilton	531	19.997	1.616	43.391658, -74.300026	3679048	02628190	
Wells Bridge	Otsego	279	0.904	0.000	42.371137, -75.243221	3679070	02804344	
West Babylon	Suffolk	43,213	7.767	0.309	40.710855, -73.358402	3679246	02390464	
West Bay Shore	Suffolk	4,625	2.193	0.094	40.708702, -73.271913	3679301	02390465	
West Chazy	Clinton	558	1.877	0.000	44.817845, -73.511729	3679543	02631628	
West Danby	Tompkins	211	1.358	0.006	42.324518, -76.533405	3679697	02806986	
West Elmira	Chemung	4,850	3.038	0.116	42.087725, -76.843282	3679785	02390468	
West End	Otsego	1,864	3.652	0.075	42.476283, -75.092362	3679796	02390469	
West Glens Falls	Warren	9,473	4.682	0.131	43.301983, -73.688019	3680082	02390473	
West Hempstead	Nassau	19,835	2.656	0.071	40.695816, -73.650454	3680225	02390475	
West Hills	Suffolk	5,385	4.926	0.000	40.819860, -73.433914	3680258	02390476	
West Hurley	Ulster	1,917	3.787	0.001	42.008400, -74.109377	3680291	02390478	
West Islip	Suffolk	27,048	6.329	0.437	40.711167, -73.292969	3680302	02390479	
West Kill	Greene	121	2.560	0.000	42.211133, -74.373772	3680324	02804333	
West Nyack	Rockland	3,649	2.940	0.021	41.091140, -73.968833	3680599	02390484	
West Point	Orange	7,341	19.749	0.901	41.360729, -74.019749	3680747	02390488	
West Sand Lake	Rensselaer	2,616	4.704	0.088	42.637982, -73.594371	3680863	02390489	
West Sayville	Suffolk	4,872	2.100	0.007	40.729739, -73.105200	3680885	02390490	
West Seneca	Erie	45,500	21.357	0.057	42.837777, -78.751233	3680907	02390491	
West Valley	Cattaraugus	452	1.532	0.003	42.402452, -78.606127	3681138	02631242	
Westernville	Oneida	144	0.354	0.030	43.305438, -75.385492	3679895	02806953	
Westford	Otsego	145	1.645	0.000	42.651208, -74.800458	3679961	02804625	
Westhampton	Suffolk	3,621	12.674	2.191	40.846000, -72.657005	3680170	02390494	
Westmere	Albany	7,560	3.171	0.010	42.688229, -73.873543	3680423	02390496	
Westmoreland	Oneida	390	0.687	0.000	43.115124, -75.402582	3680522	02584302	
Weston Mills	Cattaraugus	1,525	6.669	0.073	42.075229, -78.372585	3680632	02390497	
Westport	Essex	496	2.361	0.000	44.183566, -73.438776	3680764	02390498	
Westvale	Onondaga	5,090	1.364	0.000	43.039978, -76.217670	3681127	02390499	
Wheatley Heights	Suffolk	5,140	1.302	0.000	40.762508, -73.370410	3681419	02390502	
White Lake	Oneida	121	2.051	0.381	43.542757, -75.148123	3681644	02806955	
White Lake	Sullivan	207	0.886	0.272	41.680767, -74.838377	3681655	02812771	
Williamson	Wayne	2,418	3.840	0.004	43.223399, -77.184440	3682029	02631643	
Willsboro	Essex	689	1.924	0.033	44.363503, -73.393164	3682260	02628191	
Willsboro Point	Essex	382	2.782	3.610	44.420608, -73.382664	3682282	02812766	
Wilmington	Essex	843	8.252	0.088	44.386878, -73.817171	3682304	02628192	
Windham	Greene	371	1.877	0.000	42.314967, -74.248234	3682469	02390523	
Wingdale	Dutchess	1,051	2.567	0.031	41.635455, -73.569940	3682579	02806935	
Winthrop	St. Lawrence	489	2.777	0.023	44.803639, -74.809951	3682612	02584303	
Witherbee	Essex	385	0.734	0.000	44.083720, -73.537060	3682656	02584304	
Woodbourne	Sullivan	411	0.721	0.000	41.761057, -74.597721	3682733	02806975	
Woodbury	Nassau	9,335	5.009	0.016	40.820348, -73.472077	3682744	02390529	
Woodmere	Nassau	18,669	2.551	0.267	40.637358, -73.721186	3682942	02390535	
Woodstock	Ulster	2,521	5.916	0.009	42.046044, -74.109455	3683041	02390539	
Woodsville	Livingston	70	0.317	0.000	42.579024, -77.733838	3683063	02584305	
Worcester	Otsego	986	8.563	0.046	42.614104, -74.739844	3683118	02628193	
Wurtsboro Hills	Sullivan	867	1.185	0.003	41.595959, -74.510145	3683283	02806976	
Wyandanch	Suffolk	12,990	4.473	0.003	40.746804, -73.376619	3683294	02390541	
Wynantskill	Rensselaer	4,050	2.360	0.003	42.685790, -73.642348	3683349	02390543	
Yaphank	Suffolk	5,974	13.649	0.123	40.831652, -72.923760	3683426	02390547	
York	Livingston	488	2.754	0.000	42.869559, -77.887228	3684011	02584306	
Yorkshire	Cattaraugus	1,176	1.845	0.010	42.523366, -78.475521	3684044	02390551	
Yorktown Heights	Westchester	1,884	0.914	0.003	41.270326, -73.774314	3684088	02390554	
Zena	Ulster	1,038	2.935	0.000	42.020978, -74.085504	3684187	02390555	

== See also ==
- Administrative divisions of New York
- List of counties in New York
- List of towns in New York
- List of municipalities in New York
