= List of New York State Historic Markers in Livingston County, New York =

This is an incomplete list of New York State Historic Markers in Livingston County, New York.

== Listings county-wide ==
| | Marker name | Image | Date designated | Location | City or Town | Coords | Marker text |
|---|---|---|---|---|---|---|---|
| 1 | BIG SPRINGS | | | On Nys 5 At Caledonia | Caledonia, Town Of, New York | | Ancient Indian Camp Site On Niagara Trail Earliest White Toureist 1615 Scottish Settlers 1799 Terminus Pioneer R.r. 1838 HMDb 58246 |
| 2 | CALEDONIA | | | On Nys 5 At West End Of Caledonia | Caledonia, Town Of, New York | | Organized 1803 As Town Of Southampton; Name Changed To Caledonia 1806; Scottish Emigrants Settled 1799 Village Incorporated 1891 |
| 3 | CALEDONIA | | | On Nys 5 At West End Of Caledonia | Caledonia, Town Of, New York | | Organized 1803 As Town Of Southampton; Name Changed To Caledonia 1806; Scottish Emigrants Settled 1799 Village Incorporated 1891 |
| 4 | CALEDONIA | | | On Nys 36 At North End Of Caledonia | Caledonia, Town Of, New York | | Organized 1803 As Town Of Southampton; Name Changed To Caledonia 1806; Scottish Emigrants Settled 1799 Village Incorporated 1891 |
| 5 | ERECTED 1826 | | | On Nys 5 At Caledonia | Caledonia, Town Of, New York | | By Jajor Gad Blakslee Early Post Office First Bank Apothecary Shop Now Caledonia Library |
| 6 | ERECTED 1827 | | | On Nys 5 At Caledonia | Caledonia, Town Of, New York | | By James R. Clark Early Tavern, Postoffice, Early Bank, Library Certified By Historic American Buildings Survey |
| 7 | JOHN HUGH | | | On Nys 5 About 4 Miles Southeast Of Caledonia | Caledonia, Town Of, New York | | Mac Naughton 1826–1891 Lived Here 20 Years Famous Poet And Song Writer |
| 8 | MILITARY ROUTE | | | On Us 15 At Foots Corners | Conesus, Town Of, New York | | Of The Sullivan-clinton Army On Its Campaign Against The British And Indians Of Western New York In 1779 |
| 9 | MILITARY ROUTE | | | On Nys 256 About 1 Mile South Of Maple Beach | Conesus, Town Of, New York | | Of The Sullivan-clinton Army On Its Campaign Against The British And Indians Of Western New York In 1779 |
| 10 | UNION CEMETERY | | | On Nys 256 About 1 Mile North Of Scottsburg | Conesus, Town Of, New York | | Here Is Buried Captain Daniel Shays 1747–1825 Served In The Revolution Leader Of Shays' Rebellion |
| 11 | ABOUT 1/4 MILE WEST | | | On Nys 63 At Geneseo | Geneseo, Town Of, New York | | Treaty Of Big Tree Site Of Memorable Treaty Releasing Seneca Title To 3,600,000 Acres Of Land September 15, 1797 |
| 12 | 1 MILE | | | On Nys 256 At Maple Beach | Groveland, Town Of, New York | | Groveland Hill Tory-Indian Ambush Sullivan Expedition 1779 Fifteen Scouts Killed Boyd And Parker Captured |
| 13 | MILITARY ROUTE | | | On Nys 63 About 1¼ Miles South Of Hampton Corners | Groveland, Town Of, New York | | Of The Sullivan-clinton Army On Its Campaign Against The British And Indians Of Western New York In 1779 |
| 14 | SITE OF | | | On Nys 63 About 3 Miles South Of Geneseo | Groveland, Town Of, New York | | Williamsburg First Settlement In County Established 1792 By Charles Williamson |
| 15 | ARROW | | | On Town Rd. About 1 Mile West Of Maple Beach | Groveland, Town Of, New York | | Groveland Hill Tory-Indian Ambush Sullivan Expedition 1779 Fifteen Scouts Killed Boyd And Parker Captured |
| 16 | 2 MILES [ARROW] | | | At Intersection Us 20A & Bys 36 At Leicester | Leicester, Town Of, New York | | Boyd-parker Tourture Tree And Burial Mound. Western Limit Sullivan's Expedition 1779. Seneca Village Little Beard's Town |
| 17 | BOYD-PARKER | | | On Us 20 A & Nys 39 About 1/2 Mi. East Of Cuylerville | Leicester, Town Of, New York | | Torture Tree And Burial Mound. Western Limit Sullivan's Expedition 1779. Seneca Village Little Beard Town |
| 18 | SITE OF | | | On Town Rd. About 1½ Mis. N. Of Cuylerville | Leicester, Town Of, New York | | A-on-do-wa-nuh (Big Tree) Seneca Indian Village |
| 19 | SITE OF | | | On Squawkie Hill Rd. About 2 Mis. S. Of Leicester | Leicester, Town Of, New York | | De-yu-it-ga-oh (Valley Begins To Widen) Seneca Indian Village The Spring Used By Mary Jemison Is Nearby |
| 20 | THIS | | | On Squawkie Hill Rd. About 1½ Mis. S. Of Leicester | Leicester, Town Of, New York | | Log House Erected And Occupied By Thomas Jemison (Buffalo Tom) Grandson Of Mary Jemison |
| 21 | GANDICHIRAGOU | | | At Intersection Of Us 20 & Nys 5 With Nys 15A At Lima | Lima, Town Of, New York | | "At The Forks Of The Trail" Name Recorded 1634. Destroyed By De Nonville's French Army 1687. Site Also Of Father Garnier's Chapel Of St. Jean |
| 22 | GENESEE WESLEYAN SEMINARY | | | At Intersection Of College Ave. & Genesee St. At Lima | Lima, Town Of, New York | | Founded 1832 Genesee College Established 1849 And On April 14, 1869 Was Allowed To Remove To Form Syracuse University |
| 23 | SITE OF | | | On Us 20 & Nys 5 At Lima | Lima, Town Of, New York | | Ska-hase-ga-o (Was-a-long-creek) A Populous Modern Seneca Indian Village |
| 24 | WARNER HOUSE | | | On Us 20 & Nys 5 At Lima | Lima, Town Of, New York | | Built By Ashahel Warner, 1810 Who Was Pioneer In 1795 Used By Trinity Mark Masonic Lodge No. 59, 1810 Union Lodge No. 45, 1816 |
| 25 | 1/3 MILE EAST | | | On Co. Rd. About 3/4 Mi. So. Livonia Center | Livonia, Town Of, New York | | Site Of Home Solomon Woodruff First Settler Of Livonia, 1789 |
| 26 | JACKSONVILLE | | | On Tn. Rd. About 1 Mi. N.e. Hemlock Near Livingston-Ontario Co.line | Livonia, Town Of, New York | | Founded 1830 By Andrew Holden Comprised 130 Houses, 10 Mills, Brickyard, 2 Distilleries |
| 27 | MILITARY ROUTE | | | On Nys 15A About 1 Mi. South Of Hemlock | Livonia, Town Of, New York | | Of Sullivan-clinton Army On Its Campaign Against The British And Indians Of Western New York In 1779 |
| 28 | BIRTHPLACE OF | | | On Nys 36 At Mount Morris | Mount Morris, Town Of, New York | | Francis Bellamy 1855–1931 Author Of "The Plege Of Allegiance To The Flag" |
| 29 | FRANCIS BELLAMY | | | On Nys 36 At Mount Morris | Mount Morris, Town Of, New York | | Memorial Park Named In Honor Of Francis Bellamy, 1855–1931, Author Of "The Plege Of Allegiance To The Flag" |
| 30 | IN THIS CHURCH WAS | | | At Intersection Of Exchange & Church Sts. In Dansville | North Dansville, Town Of, New York | | Organized First Local Red Cross Society In The United States By Clara Barton August 22, 1881 |
| 31 | SITE OF | | | On Nys 36 At Dansville | North Dansville, Town Of, New York | | First House In Dansville, Built In 1795 By Cornelius Mc Coy Who Came To America From Ireland In 1788 |
| 32 | SITE OF THE | | | On Main St. In Dansville | North Dansville, Town Of, New York | | First Church In Dansville German Evangelical Lutheran Church 1826–1918 |
| 33 | BISBEETOWN | | | On Town Rd. About 1/4 Mile East Of Westview | Ossian, Town Of, New York | | Settled 1819 By Luther Bisbee Born 1762-Died 1856 Soldier Of The American Revolution From Massachusetts Site Of First House 1 Mile South |
| 34 | HOME - 1850 | | | On Town Rd. About 1/4 Mile East Of Westview | Ossian, Town Of, New York | | Of Luther Bisbee Ii And His Wife, Eliza West, Descendants Of Thomas Besbridge And Francis West, Freemen Of Plymouth Colony, Massachusetts 1637–1670 |
| 35 | INDIAN CABIN | | | On Town Rd. At Westview | Ossian, Town Of, New York | | Nearby Is The Site Of The Last Cabin In This Town, Occupied By The Senecas, Before Their Removal To The Buffalo Reservation, 1826. |
| 36 | OSSIAN CENTER | | | At Intersection Of County Roads At Ossian | Ossian, Town Of, New York | | Settled In 1804 By Judge Richard And James Porter. They With Their Brother, Nathaniel, Were First Settlers In The Town |
| 37 | TELEGRAPH ROAD | | | On Town Rd. About 1/4 Mile East Of Westview | Ossian, Town Of, New York | | Route Of New York And Erie Telegraph Line Constructed In 1848 Under The Supervision Of Ezra Cornell Founder Of Cornell University |
| 38 | APPROACHING | | | On Co. Rd. Leading To Erie Rr. Bridge Over Genesee R. At Portage | Portage, Town Of, New York | | Civil War Parade Ground 1826–1865 |
| 39 | APPROACHING | | | At Intersection Nys 245 & Co. Rd. Leading To Erie Rr Bridge Over Genesee R. | Portage, Town Of, New York | | Civil War Parade Ground 1826–1865 |
| 40 | CIVIL WAR | | | On Co. Rd. Leading To Erie Rr. Bridge Over Genesee R. At Portage | Portage, Town Of, New York | | Parade Ground 1862–1865 130Th N.y. Regt., Later 1St N.y. Dragoons And 136Th N.y. Regt. Of Infantry, 1826 |
| 41 | KISH-A-WA | | | On County Rd. At Hunts Hollow | Portage, Town Of, New York | | First Settlers In 1816; Only Village In 15 Miles; Home Of Many Famous People; Path Of "Old Indian Trail" |
| 42 | PORTAGE BRIDGE | | | On Livingston Co. Side Of Erie Rr. Bridge Over Genesee R. At Portage | Portage, Town Of, New York | | Replaces Largest Wooden Bridge In The World. Built In 1852. 300 Acres Of Timber Used In Construction Burned In 1875 |
| 43 | SCHOOL SITE | | | On Co. Rd. About 1/2 Mil. W. Of Hunts Hollow | Portage, Town Of, New York | | Frame Building, About 1819; Abandoned For One Of Two Room As Number Of Pupils Grew. Samuel Hunt, Brother Of Governor Hunt, Taught Here. |
| 44 | BRICK SCHOOL | | | On Nys 36 At York | York, Town Of, New York | | District No. 8; Built 1825. President Chester A. Arthur Attended This School 1837 To 1842 |
| 45 | SITE OF | | | On Tn. Rd. About 1/2 Mi. South Of Piffard | York, Town Of, New York | | O-ha-gi (Crowding The Bank) Tuscarora Indian Village Only One In County |
| 45 | 5 ARCH BRIDGE | | | Northeast of Avon | Avon, New York | 42.8985°N 77.7639°W) | Built 1856-57 by the Genesee Valley RR to span the Conesus Outlet, the 200 ft long X 12 ft wide limestone bridge was part of the Rochester Avon Geneseo Mt. Morris Line. Avon became a RR hub connecting Buffalo-Rochester-Corning-Hornell. The line was electrified in 1907 with 13 runs daily between Rochester and Mt. Morris. In 1941 the Avon Mt. Morris section was abandoned and the rails removed. |

== See also ==
- List of New York State Historic Markers
- National Register of Historic Places listings in New York
- List of National Historic Landmarks in New York
