= Fairview, New York =

Fairview is the name of some places in the U.S. state of New York:

- Fairview, Dutchess County, New York
- Fairview, Westchester County, New York
