= Emily Scott =

Emily Scott may refer to:

- Emily Scott (DJ) (born 1983), Australian DJ, model, record producer, and television personality
- Emily Scott (speed skater) (born 1989), American short track speed skater
- Emily Scott (rugby union) (born 1992), English rugby union player
- Emily Maria Scott (1832–1915), American artist
