= Websters Crossing, New York =

- Census-designated place
- Location within New York Location within the United States
- Coordinates: 42°40′11″N 77°38′06″W
- Country: United States
- State: New York
- County: Livingston
- Town: Springwater

Area
  - Total: 0.11 sq mi (0.29 km^{2})
  - Land: 0.11 sq mi (0.29 km^{2})
  - Water: 0 sq mi (0.00 km^{2})
- Elevation: 1,339 ft (408 m)

Population (2020)
  - Total: 52
  - Density: 471.6/sq mi (182.09/km^{2})
- Time zone: UTC-5 (Eastern (EST))
  - Summer (DST): UTC-4 (EDT)
- ZIP Code: 14560 (Webster Crossing)
- Area code: 585
- GNIS feature ID: 968998
- FIPS code: 36-78982

Websters Crossing is a hamlet and census-designated place (CDP) in the town of Springwater, Livingston County, New York, United States. As of the 2020 census, Websters Crossing had a population of 52. New York State Route 15 passes through the community.

== Geography ==
The community is in the southeast part of Livingston County, in the northwest corner of the town of Springwater. NY 15 leads northwest 4 miles (6 km) to Conesus Hamlet and southeast 3.5 miles (5.6 km) to the hamlet of Springwater.

According to the U.S. Census Bureau, the Webster Crossing CDP has an area of 0.11 square miles (0.28 km^{2}), all land. The community is in the valley of South McMillan Creek near its headwaters. The creek flows northwest past Conesus hamlet into Conesus Lake, the westernmost of New York's Finger Lakes and part of the Genesee River watershed.

== Demographics ==
Historical population
Census	Pop.	Note	%±
2020	52		—
U.S. Decennial Census
