= Dansville, New York =

Dansville, New York may refer to:

- Dansville, Livingston County, New York, a village
- Dansville, Steuben County, New York, a town

== See also ==
- North Dansville, New York, a town in Livingston County
