= Springwater, New York =

Town in New York, United States

- Town
- Location within New York Location within the United States
- Coordinates: 42°38′0″N 77°34′18″W
- Country: United States
- State: New York
- County: Livingston

Government
  - Type: Town Council
  - Town Supervisor: Deborah J Babbitt Henry (R)
  - Town Council: Members' List: • Patricia Willsea (R); • Lawrence Gnau (R); • Phillip Viruso (R); • Carolyn Tinney (D)

Area
  - Total: 53.12 sq mi (137.58 km^{2})
  - Land: 53.10 sq mi (137.54 km^{2})
  - Water: 0.012 sq mi (0.03 km^{2})
- Elevation: 1,713 ft (522 m)

Population (2010)
  - Total: 2,439
  - Estimate (2016): 2,296
  - Density: 43.2/sq mi (16.69/km^{2})
- Time zone: UTC-5 (Eastern (EST))
  - Summer (DST): UTC-4 (EDT)
- ZIP Codes: 14560 (Springwater); 14572 (Wayland); 14437 (Dansville); 14435 (Conesus); 14512 (Naples); 14471 (Honeoye)
- Area code: 585
- FIPS code: 36-051-70475
- GNIS feature ID: 0979516
- Website: www.springwaterny.gov

Springwater is a town in Livingston County, New York, United States. The population was 2,439 at the 2010 census. Springwater is in the southeast part of the county.

== History ==
The first settlers arrived around 1807. The town was established in 1816 from the towns of Sparta and Naples. (Naples is a town in Ontario County.)

In 1866, a serious conflict between landowners and squatters resulted in the wholesale eviction of many people who were not living on their own land.

== Geography ==
According to the United States Census Bureau, the town has a total area of 53.1 square miles (137.6 km^{2}), of which 0.01 square miles (0.03 km^{2}), or 0.03%, are water.

The south town line is the border of Steuben County, and the east town line and part of the north town line is the border of Ontario County.

The southernmost part of Hemlock Lake, one of the smaller Finger Lakes, is in the north part of the town. The Springwater Valley through the center of the town terminates at the lake, and includes many streams that feed into Hemlock Lake, including Springwater Creek and Lime Kiln Creek. Hemlock Lake is part of the Genesee River watershed.

New York State Route 15 and New York State Route 15A join at Springwater village.

From 1854 to 1956 Springwater was served by the New York (Jersey City) to Rochester Main Line of the Erie Railroad. The portion through Springwater was removed in 1956 by order of the Interstate Commerce Commission in order to promote highway transportation.

The headwaters of the Cohocton River, which flows southward from the town and is part of the Susquehanna River watershed, are located in the eastern side of the town.

=== Adjacent towns and areas ===
(Clockwise)

- Conesus; Canadice; Richmond
- Naples
- Cohocton; Wayland
- Sparta

== Demographics ==
Historical population
Census	Pop.	Note	%±
1820	1,154		—
1830	2,253		95.2%
1840	2,832		25.7%
1850	2,670		−5.7%
1860	2,399		−10.1%
1870	2,174		−9.4%
1880	2,279		4.8%
1890	2,085		−8.5%
1900	2,016		−3.3%
1910	1,808		−10.3%
1920	1,416		−21.7%
1930	1,381		−2.5%
1940	1,274		−7.7%
1950	1,318		3.5%
1960	1,293		−1.9%
1970	1,678		29.8%
1980	2,143		27.7%
1990	2,407		12.3%
2000	2,322		−3.5%
2010	2,439		5.0%
2016 (est.)	2,296	▼	−5.9%
U.S. Decennial Census

As of the census of 2000, there were 2,322 people, 873 households, and 636 families residing in the town. The population density was 43.6 inhabitants per square mile (16.8/km^{2}). There were 1,001 housing units at an average density of 18.8 per square mile (7.3/km^{2}). The racial makeup of the town was 96.60% White, 0.43% African American, 0.60% Native American, 0.47% Asian, 0.30% Pacific Islander, 0.22% from other races, and 1.38% from two or more races. Hispanic or Latino of any race were 0.47% of the population.

There were 873 households, out of which 34.9% had children under the age of 18 living with them, 56.1% were married couples living together, 9.0% had a female householder with no husband present, and 27.1% were non-families. 19.7% of all households were made up of individuals, and 7.2% had someone living alone who was 65 years of age or older. The average household size was 2.63 and the average family size was 2.98.

In the town, the population was spread out, with 26.0% under the age of 18, 5.9% from 18 to 24, 30.4% from 25 to 44, 26.7% from 45 to 64, and 11.0% who were 65 years of age or older. The median age was 39 years. For every 100 females, there were 107.7 males. For every 100 females age 18 and over, there were 111.4 males.

The median income for a household in the town was $43,059, and the median income for a family was $49,716. Males had a median income of $36,633 versus $22,472 for females. The per capita income for the town was $17,783. About 5.2% of families and 9.4% of the population were below the poverty line, including 11.7% of those under age 18 and 12.8% of those age 65 or over.

== Notable people ==
- John Samuel Rowell (1825–1907), agricultural inventor and manufacturing industrialist
- Emily Maria Scott (1832–1915), artist

== Communities and locations in the Town of Springwater ==
- East Springwater – A former community in the northeast part of the town.
- Liberty Pole – A hamlet northwest of Springwater village and south of Websters Crossing.
- Springwater Hamlet – The hamlet and census-designated place of Springwater is at the junction of NY-15 and NY-15A.
- Tabors Corners – A location in the northeast part of the town.
- Websters Crossing – A hamlet and census-designated place in the northwest corner of the north town on NY-15.
