= R. P. Kemp No. 1 Site =

- U.S. National Register of Historic Places
- Nearest city: West Sparta, New York
- Area: 20 acres (8.1 ha)
- NRHP reference No.: 77000950
- Added to NRHP: August 22, 1977

R. P. Kemp No. 1 Site is an archaeological site located at West Sparta in Livingston County, New York.

It was listed on the National Register of Historic Places in 1977.
