= West Sparta, New York =

- Town
- Location within New York Location within the United States
- Coordinates: 42°36′42″N 77°46′43″W
- Country: United States
- State: New York
- County: Livingston

Government
  - Type: Town Council
  - Town Supervisor: Susan J. Erdle (R)
  - Town Council: Members' List: • Rick Pfaff (R); • Robert E. Schramm (R); • Nathan Powell (D); • Gregory Keagy (D)

Area
  - Total: 33.45 sq mi (86.64 km^{2})
  - Land: 33.45 sq mi (86.64 km^{2})
  - Water: 0 sq mi (0.00 km^{2})
- Elevation: 1,050 ft (320 m)

Population (2010)
  - Total: 1,255
  - Estimate (2016): 1,262
  - Density: 37.7/sq mi (14.57/km^{2})
- Time zone: UTC-5 (Eastern (EST))
  - Summer (DST): UTC-4 (EDT)
- ZIP Codes: 14437 (Dansville); 14510 (Mount Morris); 14517 (Nunda)
- FIPS code: 36-051-81006
- GNIS feature ID: 0979627
- Website: Town of West Sparta

West Sparta is a town in Livingston County, New York, United States. The population was 1,255 at the 2010 census. The name is derived from the neighboring town of Sparta.

West Sparta is in the south-central part of the county and is northwest of Dansville.

== History ==
The area was first settled around 1795. The town was formed from the town of Sparta in 1846.

The R. P. Kemp No. 1 Site was added to the National Register of Historic Places in 1977.

== Geography ==
According to the United States Census Bureau, the town has a total area of 33.4 square miles (86.6 km^{2}), all land.

Canaseraga Creek, a tributary of the Genesee River, and Interstate 390 pass through the town. New York State Route 36 parallels the Interstate. The former Genesee Valley Canal passed through the town.

=== Adjacent towns and areas ===
(Clockwise)

- Groveland
- Sparta; North Dansville
- Ossian
- Nunda; Mount Morris

== Demographics ==
Historical population
Census	Pop.	Note	%±
1850	1,619		—
1860	1,501		−7.3%
1870	1,244		−17.1%
1880	1,157		−7.0%
1890	1,008		−12.9%
1900	906		−10.1%
1910	772		−14.8%
1920	695		−10.0%
1930	667		−4.0%
1940	688		3.1%
1950	724		5.2%
1960	817		12.8%
1970	935		14.4%
1980	1,100		17.6%
1990	1,335		21.4%
2000	1,244		−6.8%
2010	1,255		0.9%
2016 (est.)	1,262		0.6%
U.S. Decennial Census

As of the census of 2000, there were 1,244 people, 451 households, and 332 families residing in the town. The population density was 37.2 inhabitants per square mile (14.4/km^{2}). There were 480 housing units at an average density of 14.4 per square mile (5.6/km^{2}). The racial makeup of the town was 98.47% White, 0.16% African American, 0.16% Native American, 0.32% Asian, and 0.88% from two or more races. Hispanic or Latino of any race were 0.24% of the population.

There were 451 households, out of which 36.4% had children under the age of 18 living with them, 57.6% were married couples living together, 9.1% had a female householder with no husband present, and 26.2% were non-families. 19.5% of all households were made up of individuals, and 7.3% had someone living alone who was 65 years of age or older. The average household size was 2.74 and the average family size was 3.10.

In the town, the population was spread out, with 25.9% under the age of 18, 7.7% from 18 to 24, 30.6% from 25 to 44, 24.7% from 45 to 64, and 11.1% who were 65 years of age or older. The median age was 37 years. For every 100 females, there were 103.3 males. For every 100 females age 18 and over, there were 104.9 males.

The median income for a household in the town was $40,789, and the median income for a family was $44,583. Males had a median income of $31,781 versus $25,982 for females. The per capita income for the town was $16,304. About 6.6% of families and 8.9% of the population were below the poverty line, including 9.6% of those under age 18 and 4.9% of those age 65 or over.

== Communities and locations in the Town of West Sparta ==
- Byersville – A hamlet and census-designated place in the southern part of the town.
- Kysorville – A hamlet and census-designated place in the northern part of the town on NY-36.
- Union Corners – A hamlet by the west town line. It was also called "Brushville".
- West Sparta – The hamlet of West Sparta, located on NY-36 in the eastern part of the town, east of Interstate 390.
- West Sparta Station – A location east of West Sparta.
- Woodsville – A hamlet and census-designated place in the southeast corner of the town on NY-36 and next to Interstate 390.
