= Jasper Bisbee =

Background information
- Born: July 29, 1843; Ossian, New York
- Origin: Ossian, New York, United States
- Died: August 10, 1935 (aged 92) Ludington, Michigan
- Genres: Old-time
- Occupation: Fiddler
- Instrument: Fiddle
- Label: Edison

Jasper E. "Jep" Bisbee (29 July 1843 – 10 August 1935) was an American old-time musician. He was one of the few oldtime musicians who recorded for Edison Records and one of the first rural musicians to produce a record.
