= Cortland West, New York =

- Census-designated place
- Location within New York Location within the United States
- Coordinates: 42°35′30″N 76°13′12″W
- Country: United States
- State: New York
- County: Cortland
- Town: Cortlandville

Area
  - Total: 5.17 sq mi (13.38 km^{2})
  - Land: 5.17 sq mi (13.38 km^{2})
  - Water: 0 sq mi (0.00 km^{2})
- Elevation: 1,205 ft (367 m)

Population (2020)
  - Total: 1,286
  - Density: 248.9/sq mi (96.12/km^{2})
- Time zone: UTC-5 (Eastern (EST))
  - Summer (DST): UTC-4 (EDT)
- ZIP Code: 13045 (Cortland)
- FIPS code: 36-18443

Cortland West is a census-designated place and region in Cortland County, New York, United States. As of the 2020 census, Cortland West had a population of 1,286.

The area known as Cortland West is in the town of Cortlandville, on the west side of the city of Cortland .

== Geography ==
Cortland West is located at 42°35′30″N 76°13′12″W. It is bordered to the east by the city of Cortland, to the south by unincorporated Munsons Corners, to the west by the town of Groton in Tompkins County, and to the north by rural parts of the town of Cortlandville.

New York State Route 222 passes through the center of the Cortland West area, leading east into Cortland city and west 8 miles (13 km) to Groton village. NY-281 crosses NY-222 in the eastern part of Cortland West, leading north 2.5 miles (4.0 km) to the village of Homer and south into Munsons Corners, where it ends at NY-13. Cortland County Airport, serving the Cortland region, is located in the eastern part of the CDP.

According to the United States Census Bureau, the Cortland West CDP has a total area of 5.2 square miles (13.4 km^{2}), all land.

== Demographics ==
Historical population
Census	Pop.	Note	%±
2020	1,286		—
U.S. Decennial Census

As of the census of 2000, there were 1,345 people, 491 households, and 400 families residing in the CDP. The population density was 258.3 inhabitants per square mile (99.7/km^{2}). There were 508 housing units at an average density of 97.5 per square mile (37.6/km^{2}). The racial makeup of the CDP was 96.43% White, 0.67% African American, 0.07% Native American, 1.12% Asian, 0.45% from other races, and 1.26% from two or more races. Hispanic or Latino of any race were 0.89% of the population.

There were 491 households, out of which 36.9% had children under the age of 18 living with them, 71.1% were married couples living together, 8.1% had a female householder with no husband present, and 18.5% were non-families. 13.4% of all households were made up of individuals, and 6.9% had someone living alone who was 65 years of age or older. The average household size was 2.71 and the average family size was 2.95.

In the CDP, the population was spread out, with 25.7% under the age of 18, 5.0% from 18 to 24, 25.0% from 25 to 44, 31.4% from 45 to 64, and 12.9% who were 65 years of age or older. The median age was 43 years. For every 100 females, there were 89.7 males. For every 100 females age 18 and over, there were 88.1 males.

The median income for a household in the CDP was $50,057, and the median income for a family was $52,131. Males had a median income of $41,115 versus $30,263 for females. The per capita income for the CDP was $23,666. About 4.0% of families and 7.1% of the population were below the poverty line, including 12.1% of those under age 18 and none of those age 65 or over.
