= Emily Maria Scott =

American painter

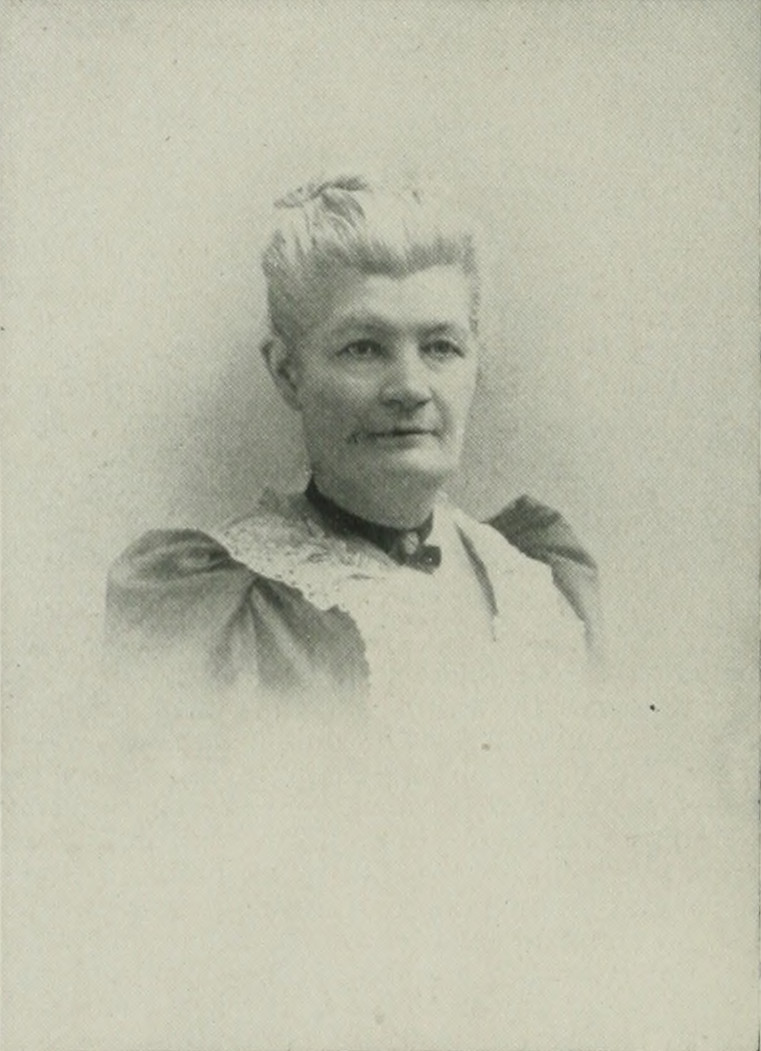
- Emily Maria Scott, "A woman of the century"
- Born: Emily Maria Spafard; August 27, 1832; Springwater, New York
- Died: April 9, 1915 (aged 82); New York, New York
- Known for: Painting
- Spouse: Charles Scott (m. 1853–1865) (his death)

Emily Maria (Spafard) Scott signature

Emily Maria Scott (née Spafard; August 27, 1832 – April 9, 1915) was an American artist. The New York Watercolor Club, and the Pen and Brush Club were formed in her studio. She was also a writer of magazine articles. She served as president of the National Association of Women Painters and Sculptors, vice president New York Water Color Club, and was a member of the Pen and Brush Club, the American Water Color Society, the New York Women's Art Club, and the National Arts Club."

== Early years and education ==
Emily Maria Spafard was born in Springwater, New York, August 27, 1832. She was the daughter of Thomas Lawrence (1797–1888), and Almira (Baldwin) Spafard. Her father, a veteran of the Mexican war, was a lumber merchant.Her ancestry on both her father's and mother's side was English. Her father's family came from Yorkshire, England, in the early Colonial days, with Rev. Ezekiel Rogers, and their history is connected with the struggles and privations of those early settlers. At an early age, her father left New England for western New York, where he built a home and reared a large family. From him, she has derived the qualities which enabled her to overcome serious obstacles.

She was educated in the public schools of Springwater, and at Ann Arbor, Michigan, where she studied for two years.

== Career ==
In Manchester, Michigan, on March 1, 1853, she married lawyer, Charles Scott, (Note: Logan records the marriage year as 1860.) of Lyons, Iowa, after which, they removed to Iowa. After his death May 2, 1865, she removed to New York City with the purpose of making a place for herself among the thousand other struggling women. In 1871, she studied at the National Academy of Design, followed by the Art Students' League, in New York. In 1872, she left for Europe and studied in Paris under Raphael Collin. During her two years abroad, she copied in the galleries and continuing her studies in Rome, Florence, and Paris. From 1876, she made her home in New York City, although she has made a number of trips to Europe after her first visit. These included Holland, France, and England, where she lingered for months to obtain all the help possible from those sources.

She entered with enthusiasm into all the avenues for the advancement of art. Scott was one of the organizers of the New York Watercolor Club, and was its recording secretary after its incorporation. During her teaching career, she helped many young women until they were self supporting.

Her opinions on art and on topics other than those connected with her profession were original and stimulating, and for this reason, she was often called upon to read papers before women's clubs throughout the country. Her studio in New York, filled with trophies from many countries, became the rendezvous of literary men and women as well as artists.

== Exhibits and collections ==
Some of her most important works are: A large still life picture, exhibited in the Paris salon (1889); “Yellow Roses,” which won a medal at the Cotton States and International Exposition, Atlanta, Georgia, 1895, and “Pink Roses,” with which she won a medal at the World's Columbian Exposition, Chicago, 1893. Scott also exhibited her work at the Palace of Fine Arts and the Woman's Building at the Chicago Exposition. Four of her paintings were sent to the Pan-American Exposition, Buffalo, New York, 1901, by special request, and she received honorable mention there. Scott also exhibited at the Paris Exposition in 1911. She received the watercolor prize at the Exhibition of Woman's Art Club, 1902; and her work was represented in the Erie Public Library.

Scott's watercolor painting, Yellow Roses is in the collection of the Metropolitan Museum of Art. Her paintings are also included in the collections of the Brooklyn Museum, and Cleveland Public Library.

Roses were Scott's favorite study, and she painted them with a tenderness and sentiment rarely seen in flower pictures, throwing on the canvas a lifelike reproduction that is difficult of description.

== Personal life ==
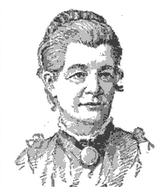
Emily Maria (Spafard) Scott (1909)

Scott was a Presbyterian by religion, and an accomplished linguist. She made her summer home in Quaker Hill, New York.

Scott died at her home in New York City on April 9, 1915.

== Gallery ==
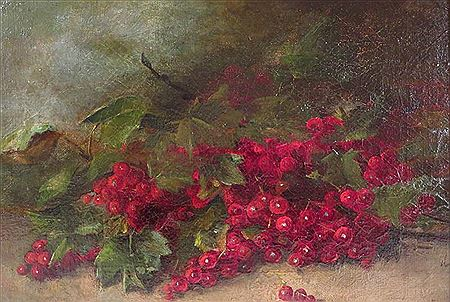
Still Life with Currants

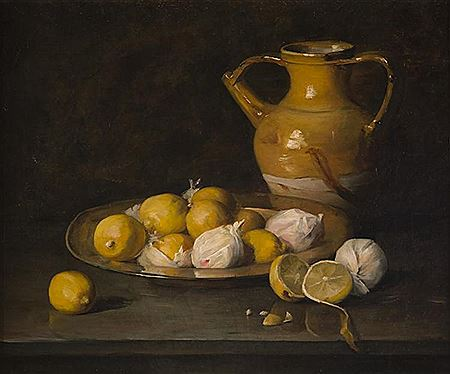
Still Life with Lemons

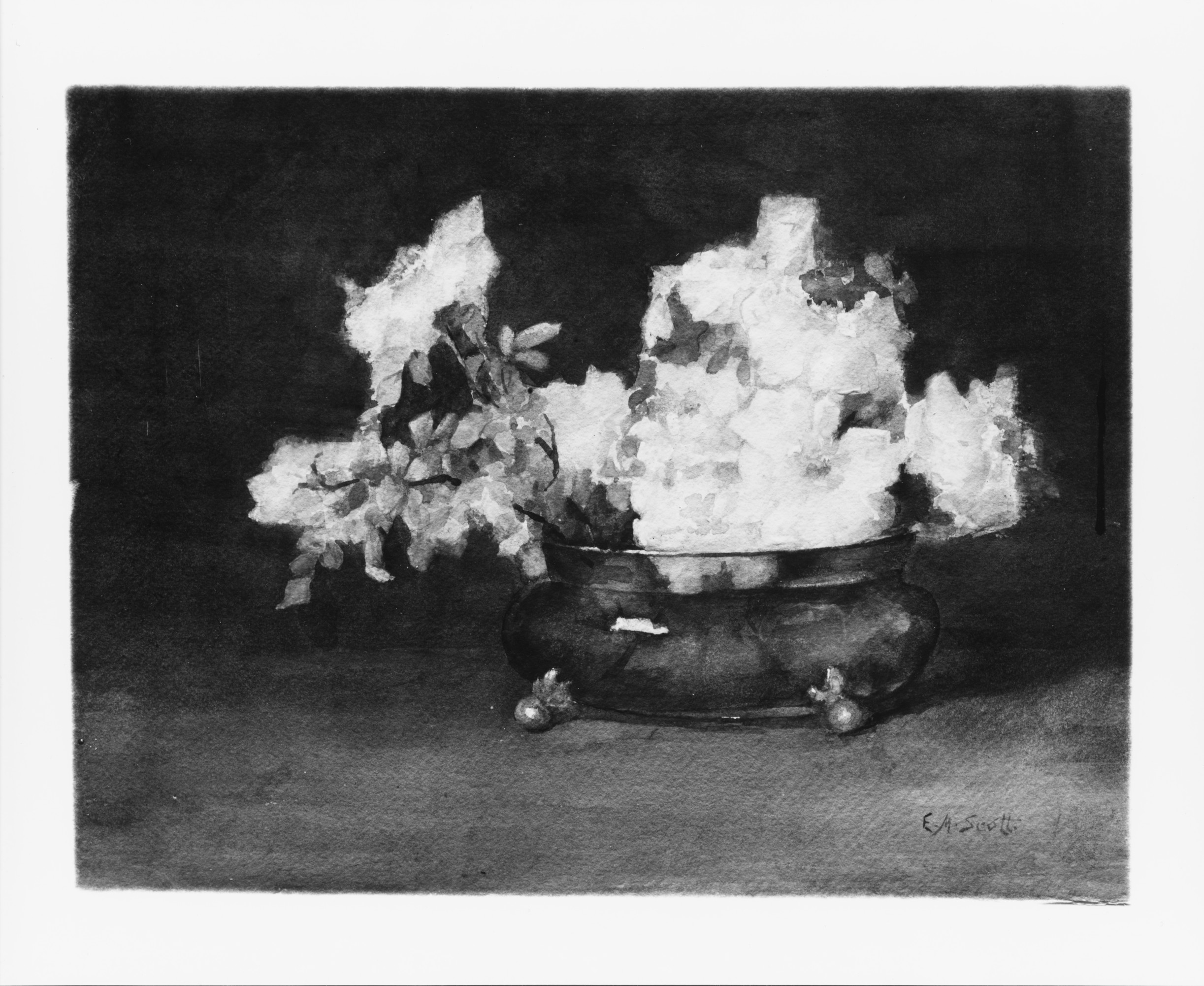
Yellow Roses
