= Cumminsville, New York =

- Census-designated place
- Location within New York Location within the United States
- Coordinates: 42°34′17″N 77°43′11″W
- Country: United States
- State: New York
- County: Livingston
- Town: North Dansville

Area
  - Total: 0.13 sq mi (0.34 km^{2})
  - Land: 0.13 sq mi (0.34 km^{2})
  - Water: 0 sq mi (0.00 km^{2})
- Elevation: 640 ft (200 m)

Population (2020)
  - Total: 161
  - Density: 1,229.1/sq mi (474.55/km^{2})
- Time zone: UTC-5 (Eastern (EST))
  - Summer (DST): UTC-4 (EDT)
- ZIP Code: 14437 (Dansville)
- Area code: 585
- GNIS feature ID: 947937
- FIPS code: 36-19411

Cumminsville is a hamlet and census-designated place in the town of North Dansville, Livingston County, New York, United States. As of the 2020 census, Cumminsville had a population of 161. It is on the northwest edge of the village of Dansville, and Interstate 390 and New York State Route 36 pass through the community.

== Geography ==
According to the U.S. Census Bureau, the community has an area of 0.131 square miles (0.34 km^{2}), all land.

Historical population
Census	Pop.	Note	%±
2020	161		—
U.S. Decennial Census
