= Woodsville, New York =

- Census-designated place
- Location within New York Location within the United States
- Coordinates: 42°34′33″N 77°43′54″W
- Country: United States
- State: New York
- County: Livingston
- Towns: West Sparta, North Dansville

Area
  - Total: 0.32 sq mi (0.82 km^{2})
  - Land: 0.32 sq mi (0.82 km^{2})
  - Water: 0 sq mi (0.00 km^{2})
- Elevation: 646 ft (197 m)

Population (2020)
  - Total: 70
  - Density: 221/sq mi (85.2/km^{2})
- Time zone: UTC-5 (Eastern (EST))
  - Summer (DST): UTC-4 (EDT)
- ZIP Code: 14437 (Dansville)
- Area code: 585
- GNIS feature ID: 971723
- FIPS code: 36-83063

Woodsville is a hamlet and census-designated place (CDP) in Livingston County, New York, United States. Its population was 70 as of the 2020 census. New York State Route 36 passes through the community.

== Geography ==
Woodsville is in southern Livingston County, mainly in the southeastern corner of the town of West Sparta. A small part of the CDP extends eastward into the town of North Dansville. NY 36 leads southeast 2.5 miles (4.0 km) to Dansville and northwest 13 miles (21 km) to Mount Morris. Interstate 390 runs along the southwestern edge of Woodsville, with access from Exit 5 just southeast of the community. I-390 leads north 50 miles (80 km) to Rochester and southeast 25 miles (40 km) to Interstate 86 in Avoca.

According to the U.S. Census Bureau, the Woodsville CDP has an area of 0.32 square miles (0.83 km^{2}), all land.

== Demographics ==
Historical population
| Census | Pop. | Note | %± |
|---|---|---|---|
| 2010 | 80 | | — |
| 2020 | 70 | | −12.5% |
U.S. Decennial Census
