= Kysorville, New York =

- Census-designated place
- Location within New York Location within the United States
- Coordinates: 42°38′55″N 77°47′34″W
- Country: United States
- State: New York
- County: Livingston
- Town: West Sparta

Area
  - Total: 0.81 sq mi (2.11 km^{2})
  - Land: 0.81 sq mi (2.11 km^{2})
  - Water: 0 sq mi (0.00 km^{2})
- Elevation: 623 ft (190 m)

Population (2020)
  - Total: 104
  - Density: 127.5/sq mi (49.23/km^{2})
- Time zone: UTC-5 (Eastern (EST))
  - Summer (DST): UTC-4 (EDT)
- ZIP Code: 14437 (Dansville)
- Area code: 585
- GNIS feature ID: 954840
- FIPS code: 36-40175

Kysorville is a hamlet and census-designated place (CDP) in the town of West Sparta, Livingston County, New York, United States. As of the 2020 census, Kysorville had a population of 104.

== Geography ==
Kysorville is in south-central Livingston County, along the northern edge of the town of West Sparta. New York State Route 36 passes through the community, and Interstate 390 forms the western edge. The two highways intersect 1 mile (1.6 km) north of Kysorville at I-390 Exit 6. NY 36 leads northwest 7 miles (11 km) to Mount Morris and southeast 8 miles (13 km) to Dansville. Geneseo, the Livingston county seat, is 12 miles (19 km) north of Kysorville via I-390, and Rochester is 43 miles (69 km) to the north.

According to the U.S. Census Bureau, the Kysorville CDP has an area of 0.82 square miles (2.12 km^{2}), all land. The community sits on the western side of the valley of Canaseraga Creek, a tributary of the Genesee River.

== Demographics ==
Historical population
Census	Pop.	Note	%±
2020	104		—
U.S. Decennial Census
