= Munsons Corners, New York =

- Census-designated place
- Location within New York Location within the United States
- Coordinates: 42°34′53″N 76°12′29″W
- Country: United States
- State: New York
- County: Cortland
- Town: Cortlandville

Area
  - Total: 2.22 sq mi (5.76 km^{2})
  - Land: 2.22 sq mi (5.74 km^{2})
  - Water: 0.0077 sq mi (0.02 km^{2})
- Elevation: 1,178 ft (359 m)

Population (2020)
  - Total: 2,814
  - Density: 1,269.7/sq mi (490.24/km^{2})
- Time zone: UTC-5 (Eastern (EST))
  - Summer (DST): UTC-4 (EDT)
- ZIP Code: 13045 (Cortland)
- Area code: 607
- FIPS code: 36-49242
- GNIS feature ID: 0958170

Munsons Corners is a hamlet and census-designated place (CDP) in Cortland County, New York, United States. As of the 2020 census, Munsons Corners had a population of 2,814.

Munsons Corners is a community in the town of Cortlandville at the southwest border of the city of Cortland.

== Geography ==
Munsons Corners is located in the western part of the town of Cortlandville at 42°34′53″N 76°12′29″W (42.581271, -76.208178). It is bordered to the northeast by the city of Cortland and to the northwest by the area of Cortlandville listed by the U.S. Census Bureau as "Cortland West".

According to the United States Census Bureau, the Munsons Corners CDP has a total area of 2.2 square miles (5.8 km^{2}), of which 0.008 square miles (0.02 km^{2}), or 0.43%, is water.

The junction of New York State Route 13 and New York State Route 281 is in the western part of the community. NY-13 leads northeast into Cortland and southwest 21 miles (34 km) to Ithaca, while NY-281 leads north 5 miles (8 km) to the village of Homer.

== Demographics ==
Historical population
Census	Pop.	Note	%±
2020	2,814		—
U.S. Decennial Census

=== 2020 census ===
As of the 2020 census, Munsons Corners had a population of 2,814. The median age was 32.9 years. 14.8% of residents were under the age of 18 and 20.7% of residents were 65 years of age or older. For every 100 females there were 87.4 males, and for every 100 females age 18 and over there were 84.5 males age 18 and over.

97.1% of residents lived in urban areas, while 2.9% lived in rural areas.

There were 1,078 households in Munsons Corners, of which 18.7% had children under the age of 18 living in them. Of all households, 35.0% were married-couple households, 20.8% were households with a male householder and no spouse or partner present, and 34.6% were households with a female householder and no spouse or partner present. About 40.3% of all households were made up of individuals and 17.5% had someone living alone who was 65 years of age or older.

There were 1,188 housing units, of which 9.3% were vacant. The homeowner vacancy rate was 1.8% and the rental vacancy rate was 12.8%.

Racial composition as of the 2020 census
Race	Number	Percent
White	2,299	81.7%
Black or African American	100	3.6%
American Indian and Alaska Native	15	0.5%
Asian	168	6.0%
Native Hawaiian and Other Pacific Islander	1	0.0%
Some other race	77	2.7%
Two or more races	154	5.5%
Hispanic or Latino (of any race)	146	5.2%

=== 2000 census ===
As of the census of 2000, there were 2,426 people, 1,078 households, and 597 families residing in the village. The population density was 1,079.2 inhabitants per square mile (416.7/km^{2}). There were 1,184 housing units at an average density of 526.7 per square mile (203.4/km^{2}). The racial makeup of the CDP was 95.88% White, 0.62% African American, 0.12% Native American, 1.11% Asian, 0.33% from other races, and 1.94% from two or more races. Hispanic or Latino of any race were 1.32% of the population.

There were 1,078 households, out of which 23.1% had children under the age of 18 living with them, 40.7% were married couples living together, 10.7% had a female householder with no husband present, and 44.6% were non-families. 32.3% of all households were made up of individuals, and 13.1% had someone living alone who was 65 years of age or older. The average household size was 2.24 and the average family size was 2.72.

In the community, the population was spread out, with 19.2% under the age of 18, 16.4% from 18 to 24, 24.0% from 25 to 44, 22.9% from 45 to 64, and 17.4% who were 65 years of age or older. The median age was 36 years. For every 100 females, there were 86.3 males. For every 100 females age 18 and over, there were 82.2 males.

The median income for a household in the village was $27,222, and the median income for a family was $31,983. Males had a median income of $26,429 versus $19,865 for females. The per capita income for the CDP was $16,640. About 14.7% of families and 21.6% of the population were below the poverty line, including 17.9% of those under age 18 and 6.8% of those age 65 or over.
