= Byersville, New York =

- Census-designated place
- Location within New York Location within the United States
- Coordinates: 42°35′00″N 77°47′27″W
- Country: United States
- State: New York
- County: Livingston
- Town: West Sparta

Area
  - Total: 0.51 sq mi (1.32 km^{2})
  - Land: 0.51 sq mi (1.32 km^{2})
  - Water: 0 sq mi (0.00 km^{2})
- Elevation: 1,358 ft (414 m)

Population (2020)
  - Total: 44
  - Density: 86.3/sq mi (33.31/km^{2})
- Time zone: UTC-5 (Eastern (EST))
  - Summer (DST): UTC-4 (EDT)
- ZIP Code: 14517 (Nunda)
- Area code: 585
- GNIS feature ID: 945400
- FIPS code: 36-11550

Byersville is an unincorporated community and census-designated place (CDP) in the town of West Sparta, Livingston County, New York, United States. As of the 2020 census, Byersville had a population of 44. The ZIP Code is 14517.

== Demographics ==
Historical population
Census	Pop.	Note	%±
2020	44		—
U.S. Decennial Census
