= Ossian, New York =

- Town
- Location within New York Location within the United States
- Coordinates: 42°31′31″N 77°46′55″W
- Country: United States
- State: New York
- County: Livingston

Government
  - Type: Town Council
  - Town Supervisor: Domenick Martello (R)
  - Town Council: Members' List: • John L. Van Heusen (); • Dwight A. Knapp (); • Raymond Bertalon (R); • Christopher Pero (D)

Area
  - Total: 39.66 sq mi (102.73 km^{2})
  - Land: 39.63 sq mi (102.65 km^{2})
  - Water: 0.027 sq mi (0.07 km^{2})
- Elevation: 1,365 ft (416 m)

Population (2010)
  - Total: 789
  - Estimate (2016): 763
  - Density: 19.2/sq mi (7.43/km^{2})
- Time zone: UTC-5 (Eastern (EST))
  - Summer (DST): UTC-4 (EDT)
- ZIP Codes: 14437 (Dansville); 14822 (Canaseraga)
- Area code: 585
- FIPS code: 36-051-55508
- GNIS feature ID: 0979322
- Website: townofossianny.us

Ossian is a town in Livingston County, New York, United States. The population was 789 at the 2010 census. The town was named after Ossian, the blind narrator and purported 3rd Century author of a cycle of extremely popular epic poems published by the Scottish poet James Macpherson in 1761.

Ossian is the southernmost town in Livingston County.

== History ==
The area was first settled circa 1804 near Ossian Center. The town of Ossian was formed in 1808 from the town of Angelica, while it was part of Allegany County. Ossian became part of Livingston County in 1856.

== Geography ==
According to the United States Census Bureau, the town has a total area of 39.7 square miles (102.7 km^{2}), of which 0.03 square miles (0.07 km^{2}), or 0.07%, are water.

Part of the western town line and the southern town line are the border of Allegany County. Part of the east town line is the border of Steuben County.

New York State Route 436 is a highway across the northern part of the town.

=== Adjacent towns and areas ===
(Clockwise)

- West Sparta
- North Dansville; Dansville
- Burns
- Grove; Nunda

== Demographics ==
Historical population
Census	Pop.	Note	%±
1860	1,269		—
1870	1,168		−8.0%
1880	1,204		3.1%
1890	940		−21.9%
1900	780		−17.0%
1910	730		−6.4%
1920	596		−18.4%
1930	510		−14.4%
1940	532		4.3%
1950	507		−4.7%
1960	489		−3.6%
1970	551		12.7%
1980	667		21.1%
1990	797		19.5%
2000	751		−5.8%
2010	789		5.1%
2016 (est.)	763		−3.3%
U.S. Decennial Census

As of the census of 2000, there were 751 people, 272 households, and 212 families residing in the town. The population density was 18.9 inhabitants per square mile (7.3/km^{2}). There were 310 housing units at an average density of 7.8 per square mile (3.0/km^{2}). The racial makeup of the town was 98.93% White, 0.13% African American, 0.13% Native American, and 0.80% from two or more races. Hispanic or Latino of any race were 0.13% of the population.

There were 272 households, out of which 36.0% had children under the age of 18 living with them, 70.2% were married couples living together, 4.8% had a female householder with no husband present, and 21.7% were non-families. 18.0% of all households were made up of individuals, and 9.2% had someone living alone who was 65 years of age or older. The average household size was 2.75 and the average family size was 3.09.

In the town, the population was spread out, with 26.2% under the age of 18, 6.8% from 18 to 24, 30.0% from 25 to 44, 26.1% from 45 to 64, and 10.9% who were 65 years of age or older. The median age was 38 years. For every 100 females, there were 114.0 males. For every 100 females age 18 and over, there were 102.9 males.

The median income for a household in the town was $46,563, and the median income for a family was $50,938. Males had a median income of $32,313 versus $23,977 for females. The per capita income for the town was $20,252. About 3.2% of families and 6.5% of the population were below the poverty line, including 2.7% of those under age 18 and 9.4% of those age 65 or over.

== Communities and locations in Ossian ==
- Ossian Center – A hamlet near the town center.
- Rattlesnake Hill Wildlife Management Area – A state conservation area in the western part of the town.
- Westview – A hamlet in the northwest corner of the town on Route 436.

== Notable person ==
- Jasper Bisbee (1843-1935), one of the first rural musicians to produce a record, was born in and lived in Ossian until 1858.
