= Fairview, Dutchess County, New York =

- Census-designated place
- Location of Fairview, New York
- Coordinates: 41°43′25″N 73°55′11″W
- Country: United States
- State: New York
- County: Dutchess
- Towns: Poughkeepsie, Hyde Park

Area
  - Total: 3.51 sq mi (9.09 km^{2})
  - Land: 3.44 sq mi (8.90 km^{2})
  - Water: 0.073 sq mi (0.19 km^{2})
- Elevation: 220 ft (67 m)

Population (2020)
  - Total: 5,475
  - Density: 1,593.9/sq mi (615.42/km^{2})
- Time zone: UTC-5 (Eastern (EST))
  - Summer (DST): UTC-4 (EDT)
- ZIP Codes: 12601 (Poughkeepsie); 12538 (Hyde Park)
- FIPS code: 36-25109
- GNIS feature ID: 949825

Fairview is a hamlet and census-designated place (CDP) in Dutchess County, New York, United States. The population was 5,475 at the 2020 US census, down from 5,515 at the 2010 census. It is part of the Kiryas Joel–Poughkeepsie–Newburgh, NY Metropolitan Statistical Area as well as the larger New York–Newark–Bridgeport, NY-NJ-CT-PA Combined Statistical Area.

== Geography ==
Fairview is a community in the towns of Poughkeepsie and Hyde Park that is bordered to the south by the city of Poughkeepsie. U.S. Route 9 forms the western edge of the CDP. New York State Route 9G (Violet Avenue) runs north–south through the center of the community. Part of the campus of Marist University is in the western part of the CDP, and Dutchess Community College is in the east. To the north, the CDP extends as far as Dorsey Lane in Hyde Park.

According to the United States Census Bureau, the CDP has a total area of 3.6 square miles (9.2 km^{2}), of which 3.5 square miles (9.0 km^{2}) is land and 0.1 square miles (0.2 km^{2}), or 2.13%, is water.

== Demographics ==
Historical population
Census	Pop.	Note	%±
2000	5,421		—
2010	5,515		1.7%
2020	5,475		−0.7%
U.S. Decennial Census

As of the census of 2000, there were 5,421 people, 1,937 households, and 1,268 families residing in the CDP. The population density was 1,557.2 inhabitants per square mile (601.2/km^{2}). There were 2,003 housing units at an average density of 575.4 per square mile (222.2/km^{2}). The racial makeup of the CDP was 81.06% White, 11.36% African American, 0.20% Native American, 2.23% Asian, 0.09% Pacific Islander, 2.32% from other races, and 2.73% from two or more races. Hispanic or Latino of any race were 5.17% of the population.

There were 1,937 households, out of which 33.0% had children under the age of 18 living with them, 50.3% were married couples living together, 11.0% had a female householder with no husband present, and 34.5% were non-families. 26.5% of all households were made up of individuals, and 9.8% had someone living alone who was 65 years of age or older. The average household size was 2.58 and the average family size was 3.14.

In the CDP, the population was spread out, with 24.7% under the age of 18, 8.9% from 18 to 24, 31.4% from 25 to 44, 22.2% from 45 to 64, and 12.8% who were 65 years of age or older. The median age was 37 years. For every 100 females, there were 99.6 males. For every 100 females age 18 and over, there were 99.5 males.

The median income for a household in the CDP was $45,676, and the median income for a family was $52,598. Males had a median income of $38,269 versus $27,888 for females. The per capita income for the CDP was $17,846. About 4.5% of families and 8.5% of the population were below the poverty line, including 9.5% of those under age 18 and 5.5% of those age 65 or over.
