= Fairview, Westchester County, New York =

Fairview, New York
- CDP
- Location of Fairview, Westchester County, New York
- Coordinates: 41°2′37″N 73°47′52″W
- Country: United States
- State: New York
- County: Westchester
- Town: Greenburgh

Area
  - Total: 0.4 sq mi (1.0 km^{2})
  - Land: 0.4 sq mi (1.0 km^{2})

Population (2010)
  - Total: 3,099
  - Density: 7,700/sq mi (3,000/km^{2})
- Time zone: UTC-5 (Eastern (EST))
  - Summer (DST): UTC-4 (EDT)

Fairview is a hamlet and a census-designated place (CDP) located in the town of Greenburgh, Westchester County, New York, United States. The population was 3,099 at the 2010 census. As of 2000, Fairview had the fourth-highest percentage of African-Americans in New York.

== Geography ==
Fairview is located at 41°2′37″N 73°47′52″W (41.043638, -73.797656). According to the United States Census Bureau, the CDP has a total area of 0.4 square miles (1.0 km^{2}), all land. Fairview is roughly four miles east of the Hudson River.

=== Major Roads ===
- New York Route 100
- New York Route 100A
- New York Route 100B
- New York Route 119
- Interstate 287

== Demographics ==
=== Racial and ethnic composition ===
Fairview CDP, Westchester County, New York – Racial and ethnic composition Note: the US Census treats Hispanic/Latino as an ethnic category. This table excludes Latinos from the racial categories and assigns them to a separate category. Hispanics/Latinos may be of any race.
Race / Ethnicity (NH = Non-Hispanic)	Pop 2000	Pop 2010	Pop 2020	% 2000	% 2010	% 2020
White alone (NH)	182	141	155	6.30%	4.55%	4.82%
Black or African American alone (NH)	2,084	1,748	1,586	72.19%	56.41%	49.30%
Native American or Alaska Native alone (NH)	5	1	8	0.17%	0.03%	0.25%
Asian alone (NH)	81	94	132	2.81%	3.03%	4.10%
Native Hawaiian or Pacific Islander alone (NH)	9	3	0	0.31%	0.10%	0.00%
Other race alone (NH)	5	17	26	0.17%	0.55%	0.81%
Mixed race or Multiracial (NH)	111	59	94	3.84%	1.90%	2.92%
Hispanic or Latino (any race)	410	1,036	1,216	14.20%	33.43%	37.80%
Total	2,887	3,099	3,217	100.00%	100.00%	100.00%

=== 2000 Census ===
As of the census of 2000, there were 2,887 people, 936 households, and 673 families residing in the CDP. The population density was 6,735.2 inhabitants per square mile (2,600.5/km^{2}). There were 952 housing units at an average density of 2,221.0 per square mile (857.5/km^{2}). The racial makeup of the CDP was 11.50% White, 73.09% African American, 0.21% Native American, 2.81% Asian, 0.31% Pacific Islander, 6.34% from other races, and 5.75% from two or more races. Hispanic or Latino of any race were 14.20% of the population.

There were 936 households, of which 32.9% had children under 18 living with them, 36.9% were married couples living together, 28.6% had a female householder with no husband present, and 28.0% were non-families. 23.5% of all households were made up of individuals, and 11.1% had someone living alone who was 65 years of age or older. The average household size was 3.04 and the average family size was 3.53.

In the CDP the population was spread out, with 26.7% under the age of 18, 8.2% from 18 to 24, 30.4% from 25 to 44, 22.3% from 45 to 64, and 12.4% who were 65 years of age or older. The median age was 36 years. For every 100 females, there were 87.8 males. For every 100 females age 18 and over, there were 80.3 males.

The median income for a household in the CDP was $50,905, and the median income for a family was $60,259. Males had a median income of $32,276 versus $34,448 for females. The per capita income for the CDP was $24,219. About 9.3% of families and 12.0% of the population were below the poverty line, including 15.6% of those under age 18 and 20.0% of those age 65 or over.

== Education ==
Greenburgh Central School District is the area school district.
