= North Dansville, New York =

- Town
- Location within New York Location within the United States
- Coordinates: 42°33′36″N 77°41′44″W
- Country: United States
- State: New York
- County: Livingston

Government
  - Type: Town Council
  - Town Supervisor: Dennis P. Mahus (R)
  - Town Council: Members' List: • Gregory P. Horr (R); • Nancy C. Conklin (R); • Richard Schwenzer (D); • Robin Humphrey (D)

Area
  - Total: 9.86 sq mi (25.53 km^{2})
  - Land: 9.86 sq mi (25.53 km^{2})
  - Water: 0 sq mi (0.00 km^{2})
- Elevation: 728 ft (222 m)

Population (2010)
  - Total: 5,538
  - Estimate (2016): 5,359
  - Density: 543.6/sq mi (209.87/km^{2})
- Time zone: UTC-5 (Eastern (EST))
  - Summer (DST): UTC-4 (EDT)
- ZIP Code: 14437 (Dansville)
- FIPS code: 36-051-51869
- GNIS feature ID: 0979284
- Website: www.northdansville.gov

North Dansville is a town in Livingston County, New York, United States. The population was 5,538 at the 2010 census. The town is in the southeast part of the county. The village of Dansville occupies the center of the town.

== History ==
The first settlers arrived circa 1795. The town was organized from the town of Sparta in 1846, and in 1849 North Dansville was increased by more territory from Sparta. The town was at one time on a branch of the Genesee Valley Canal.

== Geography ==
According to the United States Census Bureau, the town has a total area of 9.8 square miles (25.5 km^{2}), all land.

The eastern and southern town lines are the border of Steuben County. The town of Dansville is in Steuben County, directly south of the town of North Dansville. Interstate 390 passes through the town. New York State Route 36, New York State Route 63, and New York State Route 256 pass through the town. Canaseraga Creek flows northward within the town toward the Genesee River.

=== Adjacent towns and areas ===
(Clockwise)

- Sparta
- Wayland
- Dansville
- Ossian; West Sparta

== Demographics ==
Historical population
Census	Pop.	Note	%±
1850	4,377		—
1860	3,738		−14.6%
1870	4,015		7.4%
1880	4,178		4.1%
1890	4,099		−1.9%
1900	3,961		−3.4%
1910	4,328		9.3%
1920	4,793		10.7%
1930	5,310		10.8%
1940	5,332		0.4%
1950	5,755		7.9%
1960	6,095		5.9%
1970	6,358		4.3%
1980	5,994		−5.7%
1990	5,783		−3.5%
2000	5,738		−0.8%
2010	5,538		−3.5%
2016 (est.)	5,359		−3.2%
U.S. Decennial Census

As of the census of 2000, there were 5,738 people, 2,318 households, and 1,513 families residing in the town. The population density was 583.9 inhabitants per square mile (225.4/km^{2}). There were 2,534 housing units at an average density of 257.9 per square mile (99.6/km^{2}). The racial makeup of the town was 96.15% White, 1.06% African American, 0.26% Native American, 0.58% Asian, 1.10% from other races, and 0.85% from two or more races. Hispanic or Latino of any race were 1.78% of the population.

There were 2,318 households, out of which 32.4% had children under the age of 18 living with them, 48.1% were married couples living together, 13.2% had a female householder with no husband present, and 34.7% were non-families. 28.9% of all households were made up of individuals, and 14.5% had someone living alone who was 65 years of age or older. The average household size was 2.44 and the average family size was 2.98.

In the town, the population was spread out, with 25.8% under the age of 18, 8.0% from 18 to 24, 27.0% from 25 to 44, 22.3% from 45 to 64, and 16.9% who were 65 years of age or older. The median age was 39 years. For every 100 females, there were 89.7 males. For every 100 females age 18 and over, there were 85.8 males.

The median income for a household in the town was $32,519, and the median income for a family was $41,519. Males had a median income of $31,503 versus $25,500 for females. The per capita income for the town was $16,540. About 10.7% of families and 15.4% of the population were below the poverty line, including 16.6% of those under age 18 and 12.5% of those age 65 or over.

== Communities and locations in the Town of North Dansville ==
- Cumminsville – A hamlet and census-designated place on the west town line between Dansville airport and the Interstate.
- Dansville – The village of Dansville occupies the center of the town and is adjacent to Interstate 390.
- Dansville Municipal Airport (DSV) – A general aviation airport north of Dansville village, lying between NY-36 and NY-63.
- Dansville Station – A location northeast of Dansville village.
- Woodsville – A hamlet and census-designated place primarily located in West Sparta that extends into the western edge of North Dansville.
