= Conesus (CDP), New York =

Conesus, New York
- Census-designated place
- Location within New York Location within the United States
- Coordinates: 42°43′7″N 77°40′33″W
- Country: United States
- State: New York
- County: Livingston
- Town: Conesus

Area
  - Total: 1.06 sq mi (2.74 km^{2})
  - Land: 1.06 sq mi (2.74 km^{2})
  - Water: 0 sq mi (0.00 km^{2})
- Elevation: 1,010 ft (308 m)

Population (2020)
  - Total: 283
  - Density: 267.3/sq mi (103.21/km^{2})
- Time zone: UTC-5 (Eastern (EST))
  - Summer (DST): UTC-4 (EDT)
- ZIP Code: 14435
- Area code: 585
- FIPS code: 36-17620
- GNIS feature ID: 2584247

Conesus /kəˈniːʃəs/ is a hamlet (and census-designated place) in the town of Conesus, Livingston County, New York, United States. The population of the CDP was 308 at the 2010 census, out of 2,473 in the entire town of Conesus. In 2010 the CDP was listed as "Conesus Hamlet".

== Geography ==
The Conesus CDP includes the hamlet of Conesus on the north side of the valley of South McMillan Creek, as well as the smaller hamlet of Union Corners 0.6 miles (1.0 km) to the north. New York State Route 15 passes through both hamlets, leading north 7 miles (11 km) to Livonia and southeast the same distance to Springwater. Geneseo, the Livingston county seat, is 11 miles (18 km) to the northwest by county roads, and the city of Rochester is 33 miles (53 km) to the north.

According to the U.S. Census Bureau, the Conesus CDP has an area of 1.0 square mile (2.7 km^{2}), all of it recorded as land. The hamlet sits on a topographic bench 400 feet (120 m) in elevation above Conesus Lake, the westernmost of New York's Finger Lakes.

== Demographics ==
Historical population
Census	Pop.	Note	%±
2020	283		—
U.S. Decennial Census
