= Springwater (CDP), New York =

Springwater, New York
- Census-designated place
- Location within New York Location within the United States
- Coordinates: 42°38′06″N 77°35′47″W
- Country: United States
- State: New York
- County: Livingston
- Town: Springwater

Area
  - Total: 1.33 sq mi (3.45 km^{2})
  - Land: 1.33 sq mi (3.45 km^{2})
  - Water: 0 sq mi (0.00 km^{2})
- Elevation: 974 ft (297 m)

Population (2020)
  - Total: 518
  - Density: 389.2/sq mi (150.27/km^{2})
- Time zone: UTC-5 (Eastern (EST))
  - Summer (DST): UTC-4 (EDT)
- ZIP Code: 14560
- Area code: 585
- GNIS feature ID: 2584293
- FIPS code: 36-70477

Springwater is a hamlet and census-designated place in the town of Springwater, Livingston County, New York, United States. Its population was 549 as of the 2010 census. New York State Routes 15 and 15A intersect in the community.

== Geography ==
Springwater hamlet is in southeastern Livingston County, slightly northwest of the center of the town of Springwater. The hamlet is in the Springwater Valley, along Springwater Creek, which flows north 2 miles (3 km) to Hemlock Lake, one of New York's Finger Lakes. Via State Route 15, Springwater is 5 miles (8 km) north of Wayland and 7 miles (11 km) southeast of Conesus. Springwater is 11 miles (18 km) south of Hemlock via State Route 15A.

According to the U.S. Census Bureau, the Springwater CDP has an area of 1.3 square miles (3.4 km^{2}), all land.

== Demographics ==
Historical population
Census	Pop.	Note	%±
2020	518		—
U.S. Decennial Census
