= Strong (surname) =

Strong is a surname. Notable people with the name include:

== People ==
- Anna Louise Strong (1885–1970), American journalist and author on the Soviet Union and China
- Augustus Hopkins Strong (1836–1921), American theologian
- Barrett Strong (1941–2023), American singer and songwriter
- Benjamin Strong, Jr. (1872–1928), Governor of the Federal Reserve Bank of New York
- Bennett Strong (1819–1906), American politician from Wisconsin
- Brandon Strong, American politician from Michigan
- Brenda Strong (born 1960), American actress and yoga instructor
- Caleb Strong (1745–1819), American politician, Massachusetts statesman
- Carson Strong (born 1999), American football player
- Cecily Strong (born 1984), American comedy actress, and member of Saturday Night Live cast
- Charles Strong (disambiguation), several people
- Charlie Strong (born 1960), American football coach
- Cornelia Strong (1877–1955), American mathematician and astronomer
- Danny Strong (born 1974), American actor
- Donald S. Strong (1912–1995), American political scientist.
- Dorian Strong (born 2002), American football player
- Edward Strong the Elder (1652–1724), British sculptor
- Edward Strong (1901–1990), American academic administrator
- Eithne Strong (1925–1999), Irish bilingual poet and writer.
- Elizabeth Strong (1855–1941), American painter
- Ellen E. Strong, American malacologist
- Ernest A. Strong (1867–1905), American politician from Wisconsin
- Eugene Strong (1893–1962), American actor
- Eugénie Sellers Strong (1860–1943), British archaeologist and art historian
- Frances Lee Strong or Grandma Lee (1934–2020), American comedian
- Frank Strong (1859–1934), American educator
- Frederick S. Strong (1855—1935), American soldier
- Genesta M. Strong (1885–1972), New York politician
- George Strong (disambiguation), several people
- Gwyneth Strong (born 1959), British actress
- Heather Strong (1982–2009), American murder victim
- Henry Strong (disambiguation), several people
- Herbert Strong (1880–1944), English golfer and course designer
- Herbert A. Strong (1841–1918), Australian scholar
- Herbert Maxwell Strong (1908–2002), American physicist and inventor
- Jaelen Strong, American football player
- Jamal Strong (born 1978), American baseball player
- James Strong (disambiguation), several people
- Jeremy Strong (born 1978), American actor
- Jeremy Strong (author) (born 1949), English author
- John Strong (disambiguation), several people
- Joseph Strong (baseball) (1902–1986), American baseball player
- Joseph Dwight Strong (1852–1899), American painter
- Josiah Strong (1847–1916), American clergyman and author
- Ken Strong (1906–1979), American football player
- Kenneth Strong (translator) (1925–1990), British scholar and translator
- Kevin Strong (born 1996), American football player
- Leonard Strong (writer) (1896–1958), English writer, novelist, journalist, and poet
- Leonard Strong (actor) (1908–1980) American character actor specialising in Asian roles
- Mack Strong (born 1971), American football player
- Mark Strong (born 1963), English actor
- Marshall Strong (1813–1864), American politician from Wisconsin
- Maurice Strong (1929–2015), Canadian industrialist, Secretary-General of the UN Earth Summit
- Moses M. Strong (1810–1894), American politician from Wisconsin
- Nathan Leroy Strong (1859–1939), American politician from Pennsylvania
- Nolan Strong (1934–1977), American doo-wop singer, The Diablos
- Patience Strong (1907–1990), pen name of Winifred Emma May, British poet
- Paul Strong (born 1964, English cricketer
- Pierre Strong Jr. (born 1998), American football player
- Rider Strong (born 1979), American actor
- Rollin M. Strong (1830–1897), American politician in Wisconsin
- Roy Strong (born 1935), English arts curator, writer, broadcaster and garden designer
- Samuel Henry Strong (1825–1909), Canadian jurist
- Sarah Strong (born 2006), American basketball player
- Shiloh Strong (born 1978), American actor
- Simeon Strong (1736–1805), American jurist from Massachusetts
- Tara Strong (born 1973), Canadian actress
- Theron R. Strong (1802–1873), American politician from New York
- Thomas Strong (disambiguation), several people
- Tommy Strong (1890–1917), English footballer
- William Strong (disambiguation), several people

== Fictional characters ==
- Captain Strong, in the Superman comics series;
- Mr. Strong, in the Mr. Men book series;
- Tom Strong, the title character of the comic book series Tom Strong
- Salami Strong, a minor and recurring character in the children's television series Let's Go Luna!.

== See also ==
- General Strong (disambiguation)
- Governor Strong (disambiguation)
- Justice Strong (disambiguation)
