= Strong House =

Strong House or Strong Hall may refer to a fortified house, or to houses named after owners called "Strong", including the following:

- Strong House (Coventry, Connecticut), listed on the National Register of Historic Places (NRHP)
- Strong-Davis-Rice-George House, Eatonton, Georgia, listed on the NRHP in Putnam County
- Fernand-Strong House, Lawrence, Kansas, listed on the NRHP in Douglas County
- Strong Hall (Lawrence, Kansas), NRHP-listed
- Strong House (Amherst, Massachusetts), NRHP-listed
- William Strong House (Preston, Minnesota), listed on the NRHP in Fillmore County
- Rau/Strong House, St. Paul, Minnesota, NRHP-listed
- William Strong House (Spring Valley, Minnesota), listed on the NRHP in Fillmore County
- Richard Strong Cottage, Dublin, New Hampshire, NRHP-listed
- Capt. Richard Strong House, Dublin, New Hampshire, NRHP-listed
- George A. Strong House, Plainfield, New Jersey, listed on the NRHP in Union County
- Elijah Strong House, Ashland, New York, NRHP-listed
- Jedediah Strong House, Colonie, New York, NRHP-listed
- Strong House (Vassar College), a college dormitory in Poughkeepsie, New York, also known as Strong Hall
- Thomas Strong House, Wainscott, New York, NRHP-listed
- John Stoughton Strong House, Strongsville, Ohio, listed on the NRHP in Cuyahoga County
- Graves-Fisher-Strong House, Monmouth, Oregon, listed on the NRHP in Polk County
- Alice Henderson Strong House, Portland, Oregon, NRHP-listed
- Gaston–Strong House, Portland, Oregon, NRHP-listed
- John Strong House, Addison, Vermont, listed on the NRHP in Addison County
- Jedediah Strong II House, Hartford, Vermont, listed on the NRHP in Windsor County
- Samuel Paddock Strong House, Vergennes, Vermont, listed on the NRHP in Addison County
- Gen. Samuel Strong House, Vergennes, Vermont, listed on the NRHP in Addison County

== See also ==
- William Strong House (disambiguation)
- Hattie M. Strong Residence Hall, Washington, D.C., NRHP-listed
- Strong's Block, Newton, Massachusetts, NRHP-listed
- Strong Building, Beloit, Wisconsin, listed on the NRHP in Rock County
