= General Strong =

General Strong may refer to:

- Frederick S. Strong (1855–1935), U.S. Army major general
- George Crockett Strong (1832–1863), Union Army brigadier general, posthumously promoted to major general
- George Veazey Strong (1880–1946), U.S. Army major general
- Kenneth Strong (1900–1982), British Army major general
- Robert William Strong Jr. (1917–2006), U.S. Air Force major general
- Robert William Strong Sr. (1890–1975), U.S. Army brigadier general
- William Kerley Strong (1805–1867), Union Army brigadier general
