= Robert Strong =

Robert Strong may refer to:

- Robert C. Strong (1915–1999), American diplomat
- Robert William Strong Sr. (1890–1975), brigadier general, Chief of Staff for the U.S. Army Forces in Africa during World War II
- Robert William Strong Jr. (1917–2006), major general, Chief of Staff for the Eighth Air Force from 1966 to 1970
- Robert Strong, a fictional knight introduced by Qyburn in George R. R. Martin's fantasy novel A Storm of Swords (2000)

== See also ==
- Robert the Strong (died 866), father of two kings of West Francia
