= William Henry Corfield (hygienist) =

English public health physician and hygienist

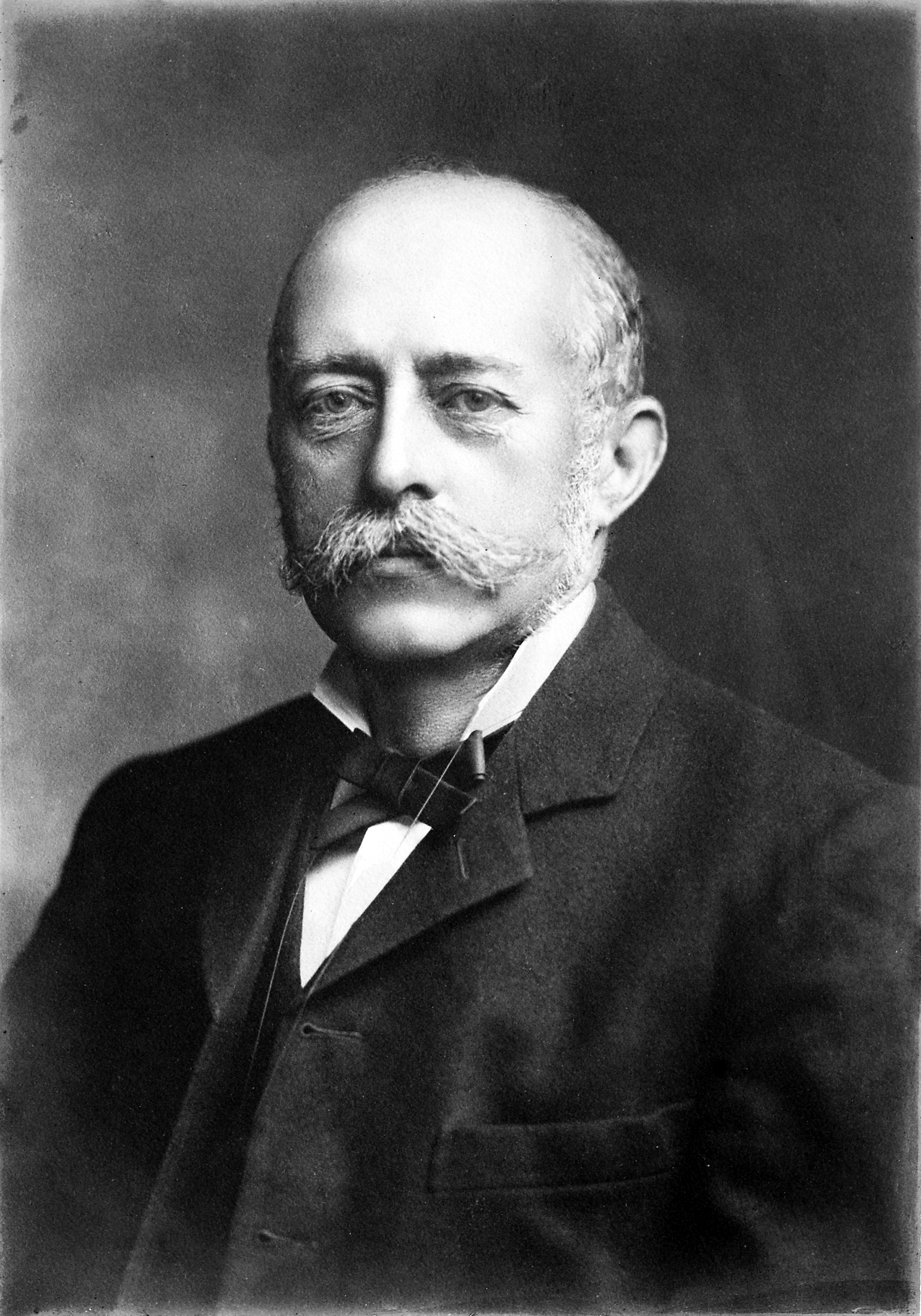
- William Henry Corfield
- Born: 14 December 1843; Shrewsbury, England
- Died: 26 August 1903 (aged 59); Marstrand, Sweden
- Known for: Professor of Hygiene University College London
- Scientific career
- Fields: Public health

William Henry Corfield (14 December 1843 – 26 August 1903) was an English public health physician. Appointed Professor of Hygiene and Public Health at University College London in 1869, Corfield had a major influence on public health and household sanitation in Victorian England before there was extensive knowledge of bacteriology and a clear understanding of infectious disease transmission. He was also an early advocate of land filtration and sewage farms.

== Life ==
William Henry Corfield was born at Shrewsbury on 14 December 1843. He was the eldest son of Thomas Corfield, a chemist, and Jane Corfield (née Brown). He was educated at Cheltenham Grammar School; he was a precocious scholar and obtained a Demyship to study Natural Science at Magdalen College, Oxford in March 1861 and matriculated on 12 October 1861 at the age of 17. In 1863 he took a first class in Mathematics at Moderations. In the same year he was chosen to accompany Charles Daubeny, geologist and professor of chemistry at Oxford to examine the volcanoes in Montbrison in France. In 1864 he obtained a first class degree in mathematics. In the following year he took up the Sheppard Medical Fellowship at Pembroke College, Oxford. In 1866 he was awarded the Burdett-Coutts Geological Scholarship and was elected a Fellow of the Geological Society. He also won the Radcliffe Travelling Fellowship which enabled him to visit academic institutions in Europe. At Oxford he was influenced by Sir Henry W. Acland and by George Rolleston to become interested in hygiene and sanitary sciences. He studied medicine at University College Hospital, including visits to France, Italy and Sicily and graduated as a Bachelor of Medicine at Oxford in 1868. While in France he studied under Jules Béhier, Germain Sée, Alfred Hardy, as well as attending Bourchardat's lectures on hygiene in Paris. He also studied in Lyon where he made a special study of the remains of the aqueducts of ancient Lugdunum.

In 1868 he was appointed examiner for Honours Science at Oxford University. The following year he was appointed Professor of Hygiene and Public Health at University College, London, a position he held until his death. In 1869 he was awarded Membership of the Royal College of Physicians London, his Doctorate (MD) was awarded in 1872, and in 1875 he was elected a Fellow of the Royal College of Physicians London. He became a Fellow of the Institute of Chemistry in 1877.

=== Sewage and public health ===
In 1869 he was elected onto a committee appointed by the British Association for the Advancement of Science to report on the treatment and utilisation of sewage. He acted as Reporter to the committee for six years. At the request of the committee, Corfield prepared "A Digest of Facts relating to the Treatment and Utilisation of Sewage", which was published in 1870. This embodied a vast amount of original research and greatly influenced subsequent progress in sanitary science; as a result of his research he became a lifelong advocate of land filtration and sewage farms. He was made an honorary Associate of the Royal Institute of British Architects for his work on the sanitation of dwelling-houses. From 1871 to 1872 he was Medical Officer of Health for Islington, and from 1872 to 1900 he also became medical officer for St George's, Hanover Square.

=== Typhoid and the Prince of Wales ===
In November 1871, Edward, Prince of Wales, who was later to become King Edward VII, contracted typhoid fever while he was staying at Londesborough Lodge, Scarborough. Several other people who had visited the house also suffered from the same illness and Lord Chesterfield, a fellow guest, died. The Prince's father, Prince Albert was widely believed to have died from typhoid fever a decade earlier, and Edward remained seriously ill for five weeks, so this attracted considerable attention, particularly on the subject of house sanitation. The Prince is reported to have remarked that 'If I were not a prince, I would be a plumber.’ Corfield, at the request of Lord Londesborough, examined the house and outlined his findings in a letter to The Times, 22 January 1872. Later Corfield said, in a discussion on preventing enteric fever at the Royal Medical and Chirurgical Society:

"On going through my original notes I have been forced to the conclusion that it was not a case in which the disease was conveyed by sewer air, because the persons who were most in the house did not get it."

Links between poor sanitation and health had been part of public discourse since the 1840s notably led by Edwin Chadwick among others. However, the 1870s marked the start of increasing investment in sanitary reform.

At the time a defective sewage pipe was considered the probable source of the infection, but in later years Corfield revised his view and felt that contaminated food or drink consumed at lunch at a shooting party was a more likely cause. Whatever the source of the infection, the incident served to focus attention on sanitation and in combination with a growth in local government responsibilities and spending, and the extension of the right to vote, led to sanitary reforms becoming a national priority. The revised Public Health Act 1875 that followed contained many recommendations for improving towns, building sewage systems, and creating a mandatory inspectorate. Corfield can be seen as a leader of a second wave of public health scientists who implemented many of the reforms advocated by earlier activists, such as Edwin Chadwick.

=== The 1873 Marylebone milk crisis ===
In 1873 following an extensive press campaign by Charles Murchison and William Jenner, Corfield was engaged along with John Whitmore, the local Medical Office of Health, and John Netten Radcliffe, the Medical Department's inspector, to investigate the potential role of milk supplied by the Dairy Reform Company in a severe outbreak of typhoid in Marylebone, London. Corfield and colleagues discovered that the likely source was contamination of the milk by water from a polluted well in one of the farms. As a result, the company announced that they would conduct weekly sanitary, veterinary, and chemical inspections of the entire milk supply chain. Such sanitary measures were rare at a time when there was no compulsory legislation. The report was an important event in public health – The Daily Telegraph observed that “the light thrown by this report upon the powers of Science ought to arouse, and must arouse, the activity of those who are entrusted with the power to protect society". Murchison believed that the investigation publicised the risk of typhoid through contaminated milk (previously water had been considered the major vector), and encouraged preventive legislation which was eventually enacted in the 1880s.

=== Later career ===
In 1875, Corfield established the first ever Hygiene Laboratory for training students in public health at University College London. Following the death of his friend and colleague, Edmund Parkes in 1876, he actively promoted the creation of a museum of practical hygiene in London as a memorial. The Parkes Museum of Hygiene was opened in 1879; its patrons included Queen Victoria, other members of the Royal Family, Cabinet Ministers and representatives of several of the ancient Guilds of the City of London.

In 1902 Corfield delivered the annual Milroy Lecture at the Royal College of Physicians entitled: 'On the ætiology of typhoid fever and its prevention’.

=== Personal life ===
Corfield, who was a sociable figure, enjoyed many interests outside his profession. He was a keen fly-fisherman, a collector of rare books, a connoisseur of old bindings, and owned a fine collection of Bewick’s woodcuts. For more than 20 years, he supported a movement to secure the opening of museums and picture galleries on Sundays. He married Emily Madelina Pike in 1876; they had six children.

He died aged 59 in Marstrand, Sweden whilst on a fishing holiday, after suffering for some time from dyspepsia and diarrhoea.

At the time of his death Corfield was President of the Epidemiological Society. He was a Past President of the Society of Medical Officers of Health, and vice-president of the Sanitary Institute. He was also Honorary Corresponding Member of the Royal Academy of Medicine in Belgium, the Imperial Society of Medicine in Constantinople, and the Italian Royal Society of Hygiene. He was an Honorary Member of the French Society of Hygiene and the Hungarian Society of Public Health and a Fellow of the Medical Society of Sweden.

== Works ==
- A Résumé of the History of Hygiene, 1870
- A Digest of Facts Relating to the Treatment and Utilization of Sewage, 1870 (1st edition), 1887 (3rd Edition)
- Water and Water Supply, Part 1; and Sewerage and Sewerage Utilisation Part 2, New York, 1875
- Reports of the British Association Sewage Committee 1870–6. (Co-author)
- Dwelling Houses: their Sanitary Construction and Arrangements, 1880 (1st edition), 1898 (4th edition), translated into French from 2nd edition by P. Jardet, Paris, 1889
- The Laws of Health, 1880 (1st edition), 1896, 9th edition; translated into French, Italian and Hungarian
- Public Health Laboratory Work, 1884 (jointly with W. W. Cheyne and C. E. Cassal)
- A Treatise on Hygiene and Public Health, 1892
- Diseases and Defective House Sanitation, 1896; translated into French, Italian, and Hungarian
- The Etiology of Typhoid Fever and its Prevention, 1902
