= Weak form and strong form =

Weak form and strong form may refer to:

- Weaker and stronger versions of a hypothesis, theorem or physical law
- Weak formulations and strong formulations of differential equations in mathematics
- Differing pronunciations of words depending on emphasis; see Weak and strong forms in English
- Weak and strong pronouns

== See also ==
- Weakened weak form (mathematics)
- Clitic (linguistics)
- Weak inflection (linguistics)
- Strong (disambiguation)
- Weak (disambiguation)
