= S. debile =

S. debile may refer to:

- Sedum debile, the orpine stonecrop or weakstem stonecrop, a low growing carpet forming flowering plant species
- Stylidium debile, the frail triggerplant, a carnivorous dicotyledonous plant endemic to coastal areas in Queensland and New South Wales, Australia

== See also ==
- Debile (disambiguation)
