= William Strong =

William Strong may refer to:

- William Barstow Strong (1837–1914), American railroad executive
- William Duncan Strong (1899–1962), American archaeologist and anthropologist
- William Emerson Strong (1840–1891), brigadier general during the American Civil War
- William G. Strong (1819–?), merchant and political figure in Prince Edward Island
- William Kerley Strong (1805–1867), brigadier general during the American Civil War
- William Lafayette Strong (1827–1900), 90th mayor of New York City
- William Strong (priest, died 1654), English clergyman
- William Strong (American football) (born 1971), American football player
- William Strong (archdeacon of Northampton) (1756–1842)
- William Strong (Vermont politician) (1763–1840), member of the United States House of Representatives from Vermont
- William Strong (Pennsylvania jurist) (1808–1895), U.S. Supreme Court judge who also served on the Supreme Court of Pennsylvania and as a U. S. congressman
- William Strong (Oregon judge) (1817–1887), American judge on the Oregon Supreme Court and Washington Supreme Court
- William Strong (Kentucky politician) (born 1943), member of the Kentucky House of Representatives
