= Weakness (disambiguation) =

Weakness or asthenia is a symptom of a number of different conditions.

Weakness may also refer to:

- Muscle weakness, the inability to exert force with one's muscles
- The Weakness, the thirty-seventh book in the Animorphs series
- "Weakness", a song by Opeth from Damnation
- "Weakness", a song by Seulgi from Accidentally on Purpose
- "Weakness", a song by The Wanted from The Wanted
- The Weakness (album), 2023 album by Ruston Kelly

== See also ==
- Weak (disambiguation)
- Akrasia, also known as "weakness of will"
- Drawback (disambiguation)
- Facial weakness
- Fatigue (medical)
- Somnolence
- Strength (disambiguation)
- Vulnerability
