= Dusinberre =

Dusinberre is a surname. Notable people with the surname include:

- Edward Dusinberre (born 1968), British classical violinist
- Elspeth R. M. Dusinberre (born 1968), American professor of classics
- Martin Dusinberre (born 1976), British historian
