= Stronger =

Stronger or The Stronger may refer to:

== Music ==
=== Albums ===
- Stronger (Agnes album), 2006
- Stronger (Carlene Carter album) or the title song, 2008
- Stronger (Cliff Richard album), 1989
- Stronger (Dead by April album) or the title song (see below), 2011
- Stronger (Fantan Mojah album), or the title song, 2008
- Stronger (Hanna Pakarinen album), 2005
- Stronger (Kate Earl album) or the title song, 2012
- Stronger (Kate Ryan album), 2004
- Stronger (Kelly Clarkson album) or the title song (see below), 2011
- Stronger (Kristine W album) or the title song, 2000
- Stronger (Myron Butler & Levi album) or the title song, 2007
- Stronger (Natalie Grant album), 2001
- Stronger (Sanna Nielsen album), 2008
- Stronger (Sara Evans album), 2011
- Stronger (Tank album) or the title song, 2014
- Stronger with Each Tear (working title: Stronger), by Mary J. Blige, or the title song (see below), 2009
- Stronger, by Jan Werner Danielsen, 2006

=== Songs ===
- "Stronger" (Ai song), 2010
- "Stronger" (Britney Spears song), 2000
- "Stronger" (Clean Bandit song), 2015
- "Stronger" (Gary Barlow song), 1999
- "Stronger" (Kanye West song), 2007
- "Stronger" (Mandisa song), 2011
- "Stronger" (Mary J. Blige song), 2009
- "Stronger" (Sam Feldt song), 2021
- "Stronger" (Sugababes song), 2002
- "Stronger (What Doesn't Kill You)", by Kelly Clarkson, 2012
- "Stronger", by Arty from Glorious, 2015
- "Stronger", by Boyzone from Brother, 2010
- "Stronger", by Danzel, 2015
- "Stronger", by Exo from Ex'Act, 2016
- "Stronger", by Dead by April from Dead by April, 2009
- "Stronger", by Hillsong Church from This Is Our God, 2008
- "Stronger", by Inez, 2006
- "Stronger", by Jennette McCurdy from Not That Far Away, 2010
- "Stronger", by Lamb from Between Darkness and Wonder, 2003
- "Stronger", by Mavis Staples from We Get By, 2019
- "Stronger", by Megan McKenna, 2019
- "Stronger", by NCT Dream from We Boom, 2019
- "Stronger", by S Club 7 from Sunshine, 2001
- "Stronger", by Slapshock from Cariño Brutal, 2009
- "Stronger", by Taxiride from Garage Mahal, 2002
- "Stronger", by The Score from 'Pressure', 2018
- "Stronger", by Through Fire, 2016
- "Stronger", by Trust Company from True Parallels, 2005
- "Stronger", by Twice from &Twice, 2019
- "Stronger", by Will Young from Friday's Child, 2003
- "Stronger", by WJSN from Sequence, 2022

== Theatre and film ==
- The Stronger, an 1889 play by August Strindberg
- The Stronger (opera), a 1952 opera by Hugo Weisgall, based on the play
- Stronger, a film shown at the 2004 Toronto International Film Festival
- Stronger, a 2011 American short film featuring Darryl Stephens
- Stronger (film), a 2017 American film directed by David Gordon Green
- The Stronger, a 2007 short film directed by Lia Williams

== Literature ==
- Stronger, an unpublished autobiography by Jamelia

== See also ==
- "Harder, Better, Faster, Stronger", a song by Daft Punk, sampled in the Kanye West song "Stronger"
- Kamen Rider Stronger, a Japanese television series
- Strong (disambiguation)
- Strength (disambiguation)
