= Piffard =

Piffard is a surname. Notable people with the surname include:

- Harold H. Piffard (1867–1939), British artist and illustrator
- Henry Piffard (1842–1910), American dermatologist

== Other uses ==
- Piffard, New York state, a hamlet
