= Capt. Richard Strong House =

Historic house in New Hampshire, United States

- U.S. National Register of Historic Places
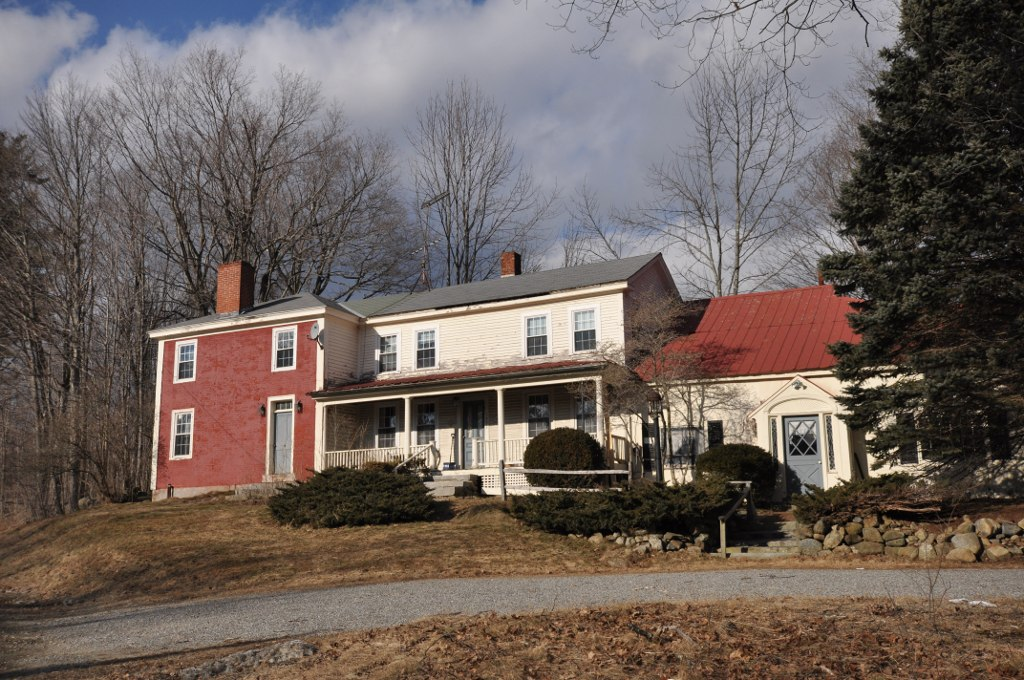

- Location within New Hampshire Location within the United States
- Location: 1471 Peterborough Rd., Dublin, New Hampshire
- Coordinates: 42°54′14″N 72°1′46″W
- Area: 1.5 acres (0.61 ha)
- Built: 1821
- Architectural style: Federal
- MPS: Dublin MRA
- NRHP reference No.: 83004080
- Added to NRHP: December 18, 1983

The Capt. Richard Strong House is a historic house at 1471 Peterborough Road (New Hampshire Route 101) in Dublin, New Hampshire. This two-story wood-frame house was built c. 1821 and was the first house in Dublin to have brick end walls. It was built by Captain Richard Strong, a grandson of Dublin's first permanent settler, Henry Strongman. The house has later ells added to its right side dating to c. 1882 and c. 1910. In the second half of the 19th century the house was owned by the locally prominent Gowing family. The house was listed on the National Register of Historic Places in 1983.

== Description ==
The Capt. Richard Strong House is located in eastern Dublin, on the north side of Peterborough Road just east of its junction with Gerry Road. It is a rambling structure with three major sections. The leftmost section, the oldest, is a two-story frame structure with a front-facing brick endwall, otherwise clapboarded exterior, and a hipped roof. The original main entrance is in the brick facade, which is two bays in width with sash windows in most positions. To the east is a 2 1/2-story wood frame section, with a gabled roof and a porch extending across its five-bay front. At the far eastern end is a three-bay single-story frame section, with what is now the main entrance flanked by picture and bay windows.

Richard Strong, its builder, was prominent in civic affairs, serving as a town selectman, justice of the peace, and state representative. He also built the nearby Richard Strong Cottage.

== See also ==
- Henry Strongman House
- National Register of Historic Places listings in Cheshire County, New Hampshire
