= Drawback =

Drawback may refer to:

- Drawback (album), a 1996 album by X Marks the Pedwalk
- Drawback (oceanography), the withdrawal of water following or preceding a tsunami
- Duty drawback, a type of refund in the United States

== See also ==
- Disadvantage
- Disadvantaged
- Weakness (disambiguation)
