= Rose Hill Mansion =

Historic house in New York, United States

- Rose Hill
- U.S. National Register of Historic Places
- U.S. National Historic Landmark
- New York State Register of Historic Places
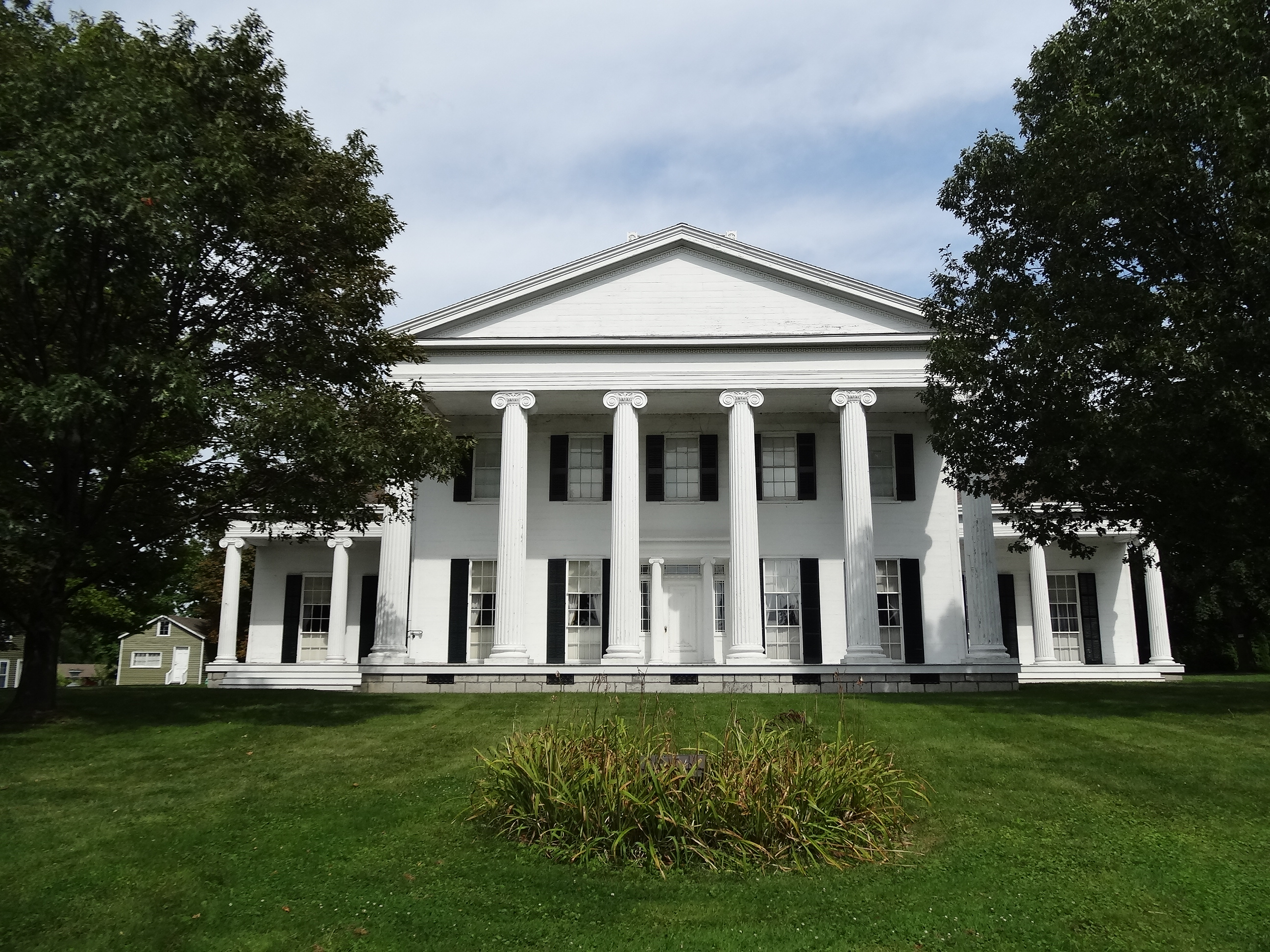

- Location within New York Location within the United States
- Location: 3373 NY 96A, Fayette, New York
- Coordinates: 42°51′38″N 76°56′9″W
- Area: 23 acres (9.3 ha)
- Built: 1839
- Architectural style: Greek Revival
- NRHP reference No.: 73001269
- NYSRHP No.: 09902.000002

Significant dates
- Added to NRHP: February 6, 1973
- Designated NHL: June 24, 1986
- Designated NYSRHP: June 23, 1980

Rose Hill Mansion is a historic house museum on New York State Route 96A in Fayette, New York. Built in 1837 on a site overlooking Seneca Lake, it is one of the nation's finest examples of monumental residential Greek Revival architecture. The property was declared a National Historic Landmark in 1986. It is now owned and operated by Historic Geneva, formerly the Geneva Historical Society, and is open for tours from May to October.

== Description and history ==
Rose Hill is located in northwestern Fayette, on the east side of NY 96A overlooking Seneca Lake to the west. It is on 23 acres (9.3 ha) of land, the remnant of a much larger 19th-century farm. The mansion is a large 2 1/2-story wood-frame structure, whose most prominent feature is its main facade, which resembles a Greek temple with six Ionic columns supporting a fully pedimented gable. The central block is flanked by single-story wings, whose two-bay facades are fronted by Ionic colonnades. The wings are recessed from the main facade in front, but extend further to the rear, giving the building an overall U shape. The interior exhibits fine Greek Revival woodwork, with a spiral staircase in the central hall, and an elaborate archway separating the two parlors. The plasterwork is as fine as the woodwork, with major examples derived from the published works of architect Minard Lafever.

The property was first developed as a farm in 1802 by Robert Rose, who moved to the area from Virginia with a family group that included those they had enslaved. In 1839, William Kerley Strong, a New York City businessman, purchased the property and had the mansion house built. Its architect is not known, but its stylistic details suggest that the builders were influenced by the published works of both Minard Lafever and Andrew Jackson Downing, both proponents of the Greek Revival. The property was purchased in 1850 by Benjamin Swan, another New York City businessman, as a wedding present for his son Robert Swan. The Swans operated the property as a farm which was highly regarded for its performance. The property declined after Robert Swan's death in 1890.

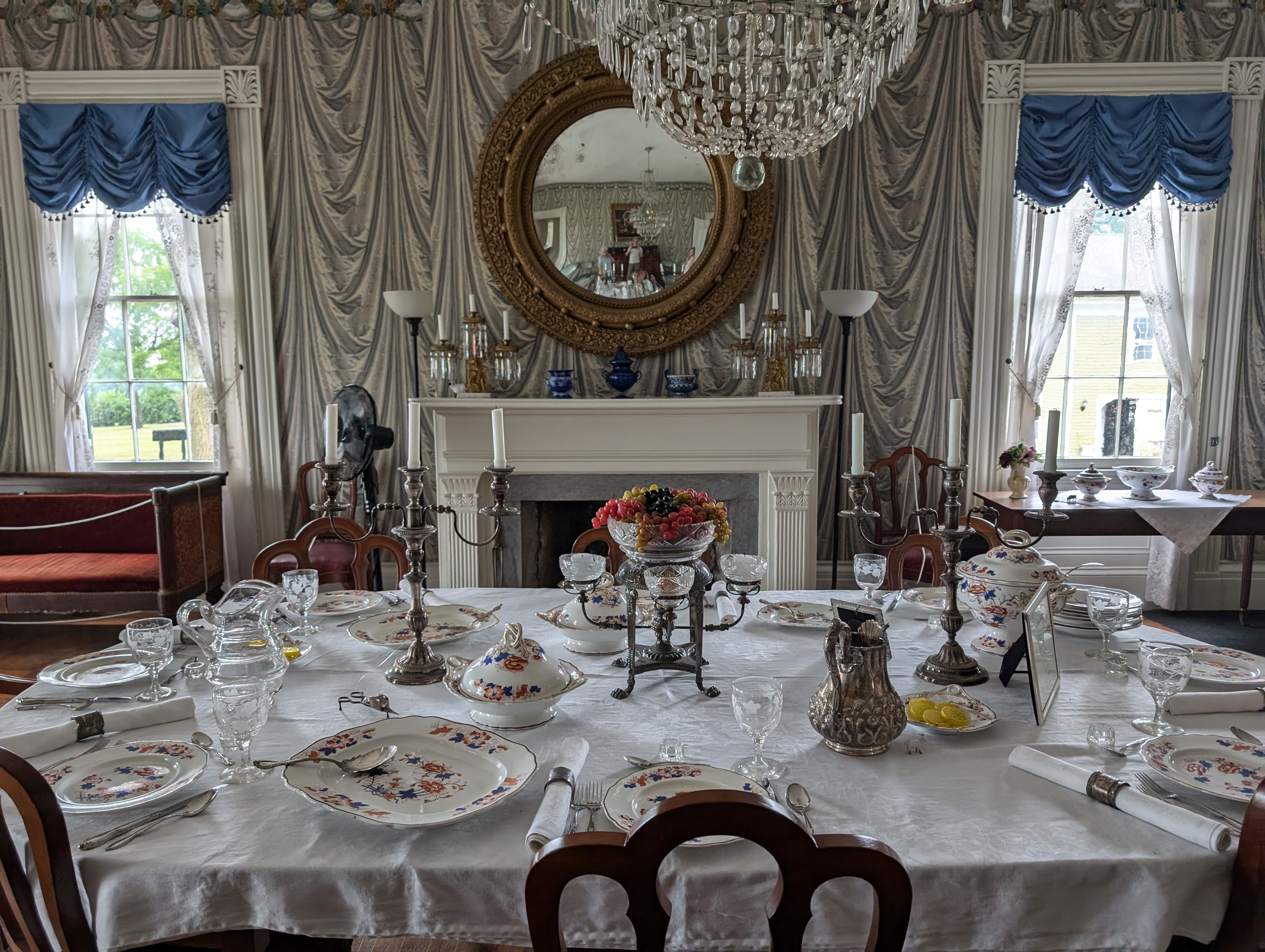
Dining Room

In 1965 it was given to the Geneva Historical Society by Waldo Hutchins, a grandson of Robert Swan. In poor condition, it underwent an extensive restoration, and was endowed by Waldo and his son to support its future care.

The property is open for guided tours from May to October and for special events.

== See also ==
- List of National Historic Landmarks in New York
- National Register of Historic Places listings in Seneca County, New York
