= Justice Strong =

Justice Strong may refer to:

National courts

- Samuel Henry Strong (1825–1909), chief justice of Canada
- William Strong (Pennsylvania judge) (1808–1895), associate justice of the Supreme Court of Pennsylvania, and of the Supreme Court of the United States

State courts

- Selah B. Strong (1792–1872), justice of the New York Supreme Court and ex officio a judge of the New York Court of Appeals
- Simeon Strong (1736–1805), associate justice of the Massachusetts Supreme Judicial Court.
- Theron R. Strong (1802–1873), justice of the New York Supreme Court and ex officio a judge of the New York Court of Appeals
- William Strong (Oregon judge) (1817–1887), associate justice of the Oregon Supreme Court
