= Debile =

Debile is a Latin word meaning "weak". It may refer to:

- Part of a sword in fencing; see Glossary of fencing § D

== See also ==
- Weak (disambiguation)
