= Joseph Dwight Strong =

American artist and illustrator (1853–1899)

Joseph Dwight Strong Jr.
- Born: September 15, 1853; Westport, Connecticut, US
- Died: April 5, 1899 (aged 45)
- Other name: Joe Strong
- Education: San Francisco Art Institute
- Spouse(s): Isobel Osbourne (m. 1879; div. 1892) Elizabeth Haight (m. 1898)
- Children: 1

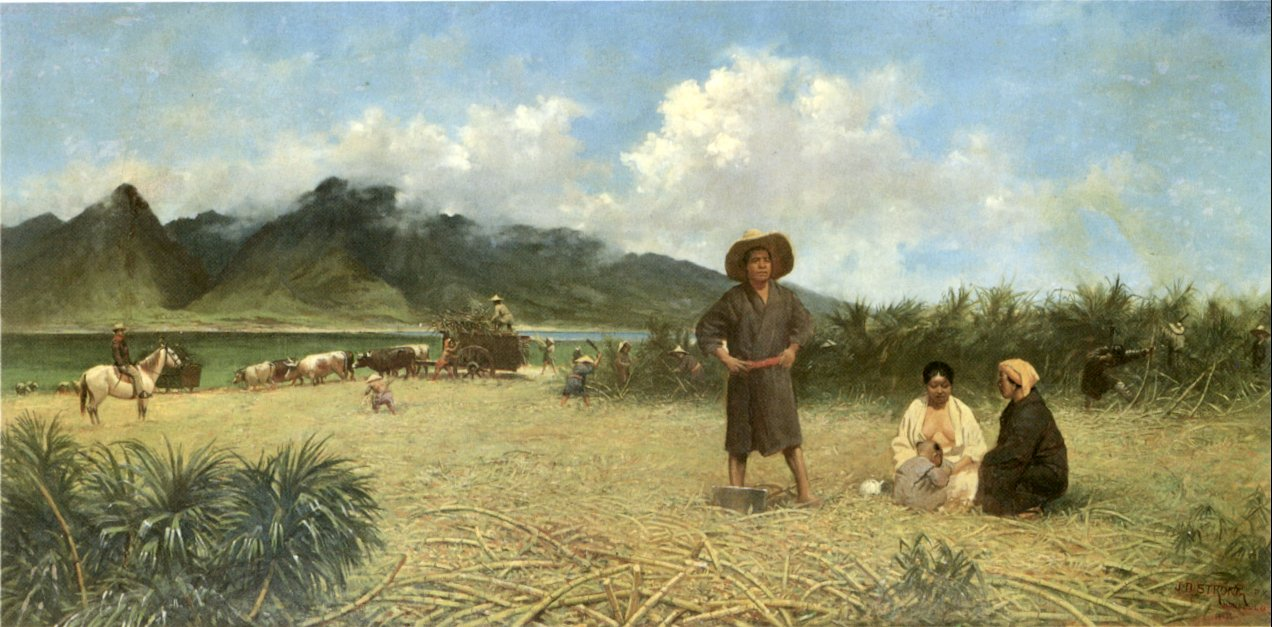
Japanese Laborers on Spreckelsville Plantation, Maui, oil on canvas painting by Joseph Dwight Strong, 1885

Joseph Dwight Strong, Jr. (September 15, 1853 – April 5, 1899) was an American artist and illustrator, known for his paintings. He was active between 1870s until 1899, in the San Francisco Bay Area, Monterey, Kingdom of Hawaii, and Samoa. He was the husband of Robert Louis Stevenson's step-daughter.

== Early life and education ==
Strong was born September 15, 1853, in Westport, Connecticut, to father Reverend Joseph Dwight Strong and mother Margaret Dewing Bixby Strong. He had six siblings, his sister was painter Elizabeth Strong. His childhood was spent in Honolulu with his family for a few years before moving to Oakland, California, in 1859. He was an early photographer, taking many photos of Berkeley.

He enrolled at the California School of Design (now known as San Francisco Art Institute) with his sister Elizabeth. At California School of Design he studied with Virgil Macey Williams and Tobias Edward Rosenthal. The residents of Oakland and the Mayor, raised funds to send Strong to Munich for four years of further study under Karl von Piloty and Alexander Wagner. Strong left for Munich, Germany in 1872.

== Career ==
In 1878, Strong shared a house in Monterey, California, with his sister Elizabeth. While he was in Monterey, he courted his future wife Isobel Osbourne and made many portraits of her. Returning to San Francisco a few months later, the couple got an apartment at 7 Montgomery Street. He worked as an illustrator for Elliott and Co., working on the book the Illustrated History of Monterey County.

Strong and his wife Isobel traveled to the Kingdom of Hawaii in 1882, where they lived for several years. In 1886, King David Kalākaua appointed Strong governmental artist on the expedition to Samoa headed by John Edward Bush aboard the Kaimiloa. In Hawaii, Strong had a severe sunburn and suffered from a mental illness and alcoholism, which eventually forced him into a sanitarium and placed strain on his marriage. In June 1889, Strong contacted his (step)father-in-law Robert Louis Stevenson to ask for help with his debts. As a result, Stevenson and his family (wife Fanny and Isobel's brother, Lloyd Osbourne) sailed to Hawaii to release Strong. Strong was invited to go island hopping in the South Pacific with the Stevenson family, leaving Isobel and their son in Hawaii. Once the Strong and Stevensons were settled in Vailima, Samoa, Strong had an affair with a Samoan woman. They divorced in 1892.

In the mid-1890, Strong returned to San Francisco and focused on portrait painting. He died on April 5, 1899.

His work is included in many public museum collections including at the Honolulu Museum of Art, the Oakland Museum of California, the Peabody Essex Museum, among others.

In 2018, the Johann Jacobs Museum in Zurich, in cooperation with Prof. Martin Dusinberre, dedicated a whole exhibition to the painting, Japanese Laborers on Spreckelsville Plantation (1855).

== Personal life ==
In 1879 he married Isobel Osbourne, the daughter of Fanny Vandegrift and step-daughter of the writer Robert Louis Stevenson. Stevenson described Joseph in The Silverado Squatters as a great omelet maker.

Joseph Dwight Strong's child, Joseph Austin Strong, was born in 1881 in San Francisco prior to relocation in Hawaii. Joseph Austin Strong became a playwright. A second son was born to the Strong family, but he died before his first birthday. After Strong's affair in Samoa, Isobel and Joseph divorced and his son Joseph Austin was legally adopted by Stevenson. Many of the diaries and letters which Stevenson and his family published after the divorce were edited to remove all reference to Joseph Strong, and several photographs were destroyed or altered.

He married a second time to Elizabeth Haight in June 1898.
