= Thomas Strong =

Thomas Strong may refer to:

- L. Thomas Strong III, Dean of Leavell College at New Orleans Baptist Theological Seminary
- Thomas Strong (bishop) (1861–1944), English theologian and bishop
- Tommy Strong (1890–1917), English footballer
- Thomas Vezey Strong (1857–1920), Lord Mayor of London
