= Strong =

Strong may refer to:

== Education ==
- The Strong, an educational institution in Rochester, New York, United States
- Strong Hall (Lawrence, Kansas), an administrative hall of the University of Kansas
- Strong School, New Haven, Connecticut, United States, an overflow school for district kindergartners and first graders

== Music ==
=== Albums ===
- Strong (Tyler Hubbard album), 2024
- Strong (Anette Olzon album), 2021
- Strong (Arrested Development album), 2010
- Strong (Michelle Wright album), 2013
- Strong (Thomas Anders album), 2010
- Strong (Tracy Lawrence album), 2004
- Strong, a 2000 album by Clare Quilty

=== Songs ===
- "Strong" (London Grammar song), 2013
- "Strong" (One Direction song), 2013
- "Strong" (Robbie Williams song), 1999
- "Strong" (Romy song), 2022
- "Strong", a song by After Forever from Remagine
- "Strong", a song by Audio Adrenaline from Worldwide
- "Strong", a song by LeAnn Rimes from Whatever We Wanna
- "Strong", a song by London Grammar from If You Wait
- "Strong", a song by Will Hoge from Never Give In
- "Strong", a song from the 2015 film Cinderella
- "Strong", a song from the musical The Lightning Thief
- "Strong", by R3hab & KSHMR, 2015

== People and fictional characters ==
- Strong (surname), including lists of people and fictional characters
- Strong Vincent (1837–1863), American Civil War Union Army brigadier general and lawyer
- List of people known as the Strong

== Places ==
=== United States ===
- Strong, Arkansas, a city
- Strong, Maine, a town
- Strongs, Michigan, an unincorporated community
- Strong, Mississippi, an unincorporated community
- Strong, Pennsylvania, a census-designated place
- Fort Strong, Boston harbor, Massachusetts
- Strong City, Kansas, a city
- Strong City, Oklahoma, a town
- Strong Island (Michigan)
- Strong Island, Pleasant Bay, Cape Cod, Massachusetts
- Strong River, Mississippi
- Strong Township, Chase County, Kansas

=== Elsewhere ===
- Strong, Ontario, Canada, a township
- Mount Strong, Antarctica
- Strong Peak, Antarctica
- 22622 Strong, an asteroid

== Other uses ==
- Strong Memorial Hospital, University of Rochester Medical Center, Rochester, New York, United States
- SK Strong, a Norwegian sports club that merged into Grüner IL in 1952
- USS Strong, two United States Navy destroyers
- Strong (TV series), an American reality show which debuted in 2016
- Strong!, a 2012 documentary about Olympic weightlifter Cheryl Haworth
- Strong (advertisement), a controversial advertisement by the 2012 US presidential candidate Rick Perry
- Strong Capital Management, a defunct American financial services firm
- Strong (book), a 2022 book by Rob Kearney, Eric Rosswood, and Nidhi Chanani

== See also ==
- Strong House (disambiguation), various buildings listed on the National Register of Historic Places
- Strong v Bird, an 1874 English property law case
- Strong's Concordance, a concordance of the King James Bible
