= Charles Strong (disambiguation) =

Charles Strong (1844–1942) was an Australian preacher.

Charles or Charlie Strong may also refer to:

- Charles Augustus Strong (1862–1940), American psychologist
- Charlie Strong (born 1960), American college football coach
- Charlie Strong (Peaky Blinders), a character in Peaky Blinders
- Charles S. Strong (1906–1962), American author
- Charles Strong (priest), Irish Anglican priest
- Charles Strong, a lynching victim on January 17, 1922
