= Frank Strong =

American historian (1859–1934)

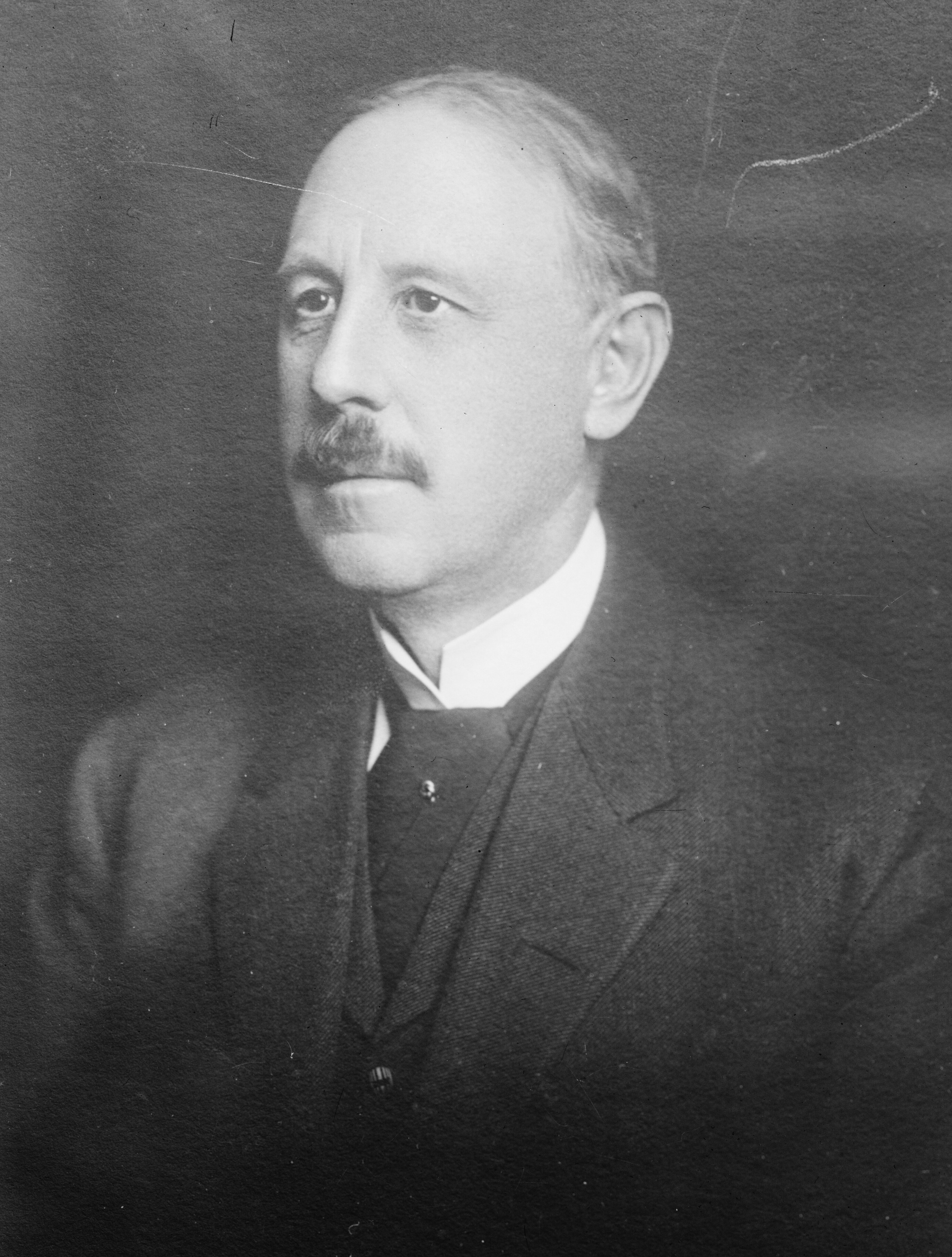
- Strong in 1910
- Born: August 5, 1859; Venice Center, New York
- Died: August 6, 1934 (aged 75); Lawrence, Kansas
- Burial place: Fort Hill Cemetery
- Education: Yale University

6th Chancellor of the University of Kansas
- In office 1902–1920
- Preceded by: Francis H. Snow
- Succeeded by: Ernest Lindley

3rd President of the University of Oregon
- In office 1899–1902
- Preceded by: Charles Hiram Chapman
- Succeeded by: Prince Lucien Campbell

Frank Strong (August 5, 1859 – August 6, 1934) was the third president of the University of Oregon from 1899 to 1902 and sixth Chancellor of the University of Kansas from 1902 to 1920.

Strong was born on August 5, 1859, in Venice Center, New York, a son of Mary Foote and John Butler Strong. He graduated from the Yale Law School and between 1886–88 was a lawyer in Kansas City. He left his law practice to become principal of a high school in St Joseph, Missouri. Here he met Mary Evelyn Ransom; they married on June 24, 1890, and raised two children. In 1892 he became superintendent of the Lincoln, Nebraska school district.

Strong then returned to Yale University to obtain a Ph.D in 1897 with his dissertation Cromwell's colonial and foreign policy, with special reference to the West Indies expedition of 1654-5. There he received the John Addison Porter Prize and was lecturer in United States history from 1897-1899. Strong wrote some works on the colonial history of the United States. Subsequently, president of the University of Oregon from 1899 to 1902, he went to the University of Kansas next. Strong stormed onto campus declaring that KU was woefully inadequate and that much more money was needed. In return, KU would graduate students capable of solving the state's economic and industrial problems, he said. He won increased funding and founded the schools of education, journalism and medicine and expanded extension programs. Four more buildings were completed before he resigned to teach law.

Strong died at his home in Lawrence, Kansas on August 6, 1934, the day after his 75th birthday. He is interred at the Fort Hill Cemetery in Auburn, New York. Strong Hall on the University of Kansas campus in Lawrence is named after Chancellor Strong. The building is on the National Register of Historic Places and contains offices, classrooms, and an auditorium.

== Bibliography ==
- Frank Strong (1898) Benjamin Franklin: A Character Sketch, University Association Press
- Frank Strong (1899) A Forgotten Danger of the New England Colonies, in the Annual Report of the American Historical Association, U.S. Government Printing Office, pp 77–138.
- Frank Strong (1899) The Causes of Cromwell's West Indian Expedition, The American Historical Review Vol. 4, 1899, Pages 228–245.
- Frank Strong and Joseph Shafer (1901) Government of the American People, Houghton, Mifflin & Co., Boston and New York
