= Kratos =

Kratus is the Greek word for strength. Kratos may also refer to:

- Kratos (mythology), the personification of strength in Greek mythology
- Kratos (God of War), the main character in the God of War series of video games
- Kratos (EP), a 2016 mini-album by VIXX
- Kratos Aurion, a character from Tales of Symphonia
- Kratos Defense & Security Solutions, a U.S. military contractor
- Kratos MS 50, a tool for electron ionization
- Operation Kratos, tactics developed by London's Metropolitan Police Service for dealing with suspected bombers
- J. R. Kratos, an American pro wrestler

== See also ==
- Strength
