= William Strong House =

William Strong House may refer to:

- William Strong House (Preston, Minnesota), listed on the National Register of Historic Places in Fillmore County, Minnesota
- William Strong House (Spring Valley, Minnesota), listed on the National Register of Historic Places in Fillmore County, Minnesota

== See also ==
- Strong House (disambiguation)
