= Strength =

Strength may refer to:

== Personal trait ==
- Physical strength, as in people or animals
- Character strengths like those listed in the Values in Action Inventory
- The exercise of willpower

== Physics ==
- Mechanical strength, the ability to withstand an applied stress or load without structural failure
  - Compressive strength, the capacity to withstand axially directed pushing forces
  - Tensile strength, the maximum stress while being stretched or pulled before necking
  - Shear strength, the ability to withstand shearing
- Strength (explosive), the ability of an explosive to move surrounding material
- Field strength, the magnitude of a field's vector
- Signal strength, in telecommunications
- Strength (material), the behavior of solid objects subject to stresses and strains

== Music ==
- Strength (American band), a band from Portland, Oregon
- Strength (Japanese band), a band from Sendai, Miyagi, Japan
- Strength (The Alarm album), 1985, or the title song
- Strength (Enuff Z'nuff album), 1991
- Strength, an album by Asiatic Warriors
- Strength, an album by The RH Factor
- Strength, an album by The Violet Burning, 1992
- Strength, an album by Unto Others, 2021
- "Strength", a song by Abingdon Boys School
- "Strength", a song by the Gear Daddies from Let's Go Scare Al, 1988
- "Strength", a song by Screaming Jets from World Gone Crazy, 1997

== Other ==
- Strength (cryptography)
- Strength (mathematical logic), in model theory
- Strength (Tarot card), numbered either XI or VIII
- USS Strength (AM-309), a U.S. Navy ship
- The manpower and equipment fielded by a military unit, i.e. full-strength, half-strength etc.
- Kratos (mythology), Greek personification of strength

== See also ==
- Kratos (disambiguation)
- Power (disambiguation)
- Strong (disambiguation)
- Stronger (disambiguation)
