= Henry Strongman House =

Historic house in New Hampshire, United States

- U.S. National Register of Historic Places
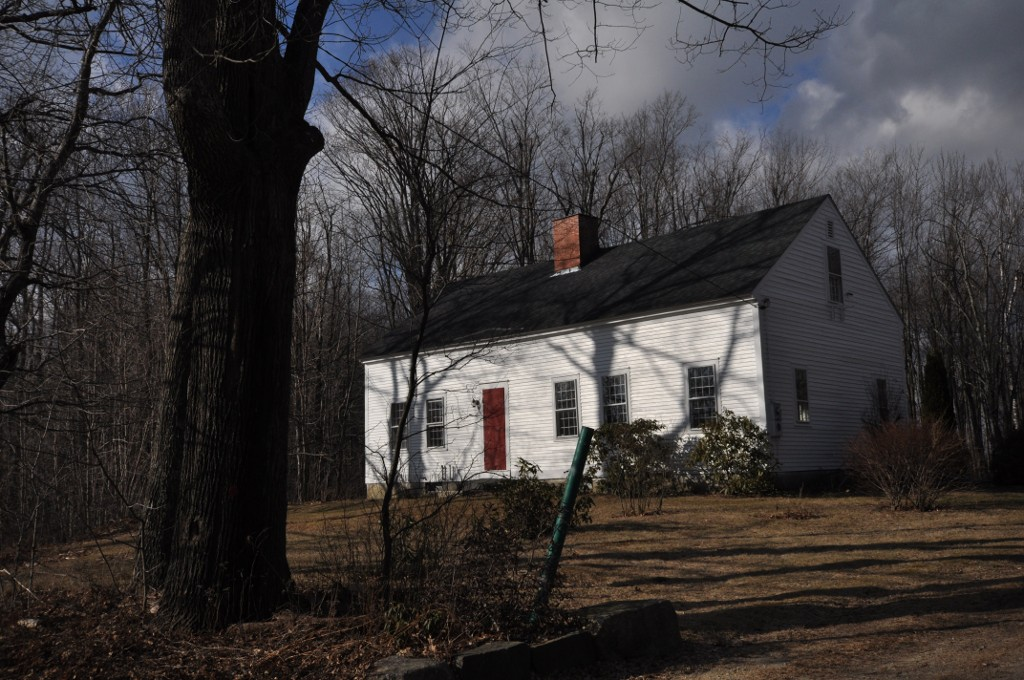

- Location within New Hampshire Location within the United States
- Location: 1443 Peterborough Rd., Dublin, New Hampshire
- Coordinates: 42°54′19″N 72°1′54″W
- Area: 0.8 acres (0.32 ha)
- Built: 1760
- Built by: Henry Strongman
- Architectural style: Cape Colonial
- MPS: Dublin MRA
- NRHP reference No.: 83004082
- Added to NRHP: December 15, 1983

The Henry Strongman House is a historic house at 1443 Peterborough Road (New Hampshire Route 101) in Dublin, New Hampshire. Built about 1770 by Dublin's first permanent white settler, it is a well-preserved example of a rural Cape style farmhouse. The house was listed on the National Register of Historic Places in 1983.

== Description and history ==
The Henry Strongman House stands in eastern Dublin, on the north side of Peterborough Road (NH 101) just west of its junction with Gerry Road. It is a 1 1/2-story wood-frame structure, with a gabled roof and clapboarded exterior. It has a six-bay front facade, with sash windows placed asymmetrically and the entrance set left of center. The placement of the windows and the brick chimney are suggestive of the idea that the rightmost bay is a later addition to what was once a symmetrical five-bay structure. The interior retains numerous original features, including carved fireplace mantels, raised-panel doors, and wide wooden board paneling. A single-story shed extends to the rear of the main block. Also on the property are the foundational remains of a large barn (demolished after extensive damage in the Great New England Hurricane of 1938) and a carriage barn.

The house was built c. 1770 by Henry Strongman, the first permanent settler of Dublin who acquired the land here in 1760. Strongman served as a town selectman, and in the militia during the American Revolutionary War. The property was owned for many decades by the Wood family, which bought it from Strongman's son in 1810.

== See also ==
- National Register of Historic Places listings in Cheshire County, New Hampshire
