= Alexander Wagner (artist) =

German painter

Alexander Wagner (born 1978) is a German fine artist. Both painting and drawing play a central part in his artistic oeuvre. Wagner's work returns repeatedly to a geometric formal language that is reduced in its composition and abstractly constructed.

== Life and work ==
Alexander Wagner completed his studies at the Universität der Künste Berlin (Berlin University of the Arts) in 2006 having been a ‘Meisterschüler’ there. Even prior to his graduation Wagner took part in group exhibitions in Berlin, Zurich, and Istanbul, as well as group shows in the United States and Italy. Alexander engages predominantly with the subject of painting. Thus drawings, watercolours, silkscreen prints, gouache, and acrylic paintings have a fixed place in Wagner’s repertoire. The artist’s work is particularly notable for its formal language. He chooses clean, geometric forms, amongst others, and carries these over into his subjects, "or even onto the picture’s topic, which has no inherent geometry, like clouds or rain, for example," as Friedrich Meschde has explained. Wagner’s works seem thus to be reduced to something essential, using colours as a starting point. His approach to form in his work is also interesting. For example, Alexander Wagner has produced photographs in which a chance description of space in terms of geometry can be recognised, in the form of an everyday object. This can, in turn, serve as the basis for a drawing in which, unlike a photograph, "visible things progress". His newest works are increasingly wall paintings, as have been on display recently in the Kunsthalle Bielefeld, amongst other venues. With this Wagner focuses on the spatial intervention, which relates to the site’s exhibition architecture and changes how this can be experienced spatially.

Alexander Wagner is represented by the gallery RaebervonStenglin in Zurich. He lives and works in Berlin.

== Exhibitions (selection) ==
- 2013: Warp & Weft, with Sylvie Fleury, Spazio Cabinet, Milan, Italy.
- 2013: Auf Zeit, Wandbilder, Bildwände, Kunsthalle Bielefeld, Bielefeld, Germany.
- 2013: Galeri Mana, Istanbul, Turkey.
- 2012: RaebervonStenglin, Zurich, Switzerland.
- 2011: Natural Flavor, Ricou Gallery, Brussels, Belgium.
- 2011: Broken Umbrellas, Laurel Gitlen, New York, USA.
- 2011: Killing the system softly, Galleria Antonio Ferrara, Reggio Emilia, Italy.
- 2010: RaebervonStenglin, Zurich, Switzerland.
- 2010: Ins Blickfeld gerückt, Institut français, Berlin, Germany.
- 2009: INSERT, zum Zeichnerischen, Jet, Berlin, Deutschland.
- 2009: Access All Areas, a drawing exhibition, Galerie Max Hetzler, Berlin, Germany.
- 2009: Form versus Function, grant recipients of the Karl Hofer Gesellschaft, Haus am Kleistpark, Berlin, Germany.
- 2008: mustern, SOX, Berlin, Germany.
- 2007: Alexander Wagner, NBKstudio (Neuer Berliner Kunstverein), Berlin, Germany.

== Grants ==
- 2009: Catalogue Grant of the Berlin Senate
- 2008-2010: Studio Grant of the Karl-Hofer-Gesellschaft

== Awards ==
- 2010: New Entries Guido Carbone Preis, ARTISSIMA 17, Turin, Italy.

== Publications ==
- 2013: Alexander Wagner, Galeri Mana, monograph, Istanbul, Turkey.
- 2009: Alexander Wagner, Revolver VVV, monograph, Berlin, Germany.

== Links ==
- Alexander Wagner's Homepage
- Alexander Wagner at RaebervonStenglin
- Sox exhibition project, Berlin
