= Alfred Hardy (dermatologist) =

French dermatologist

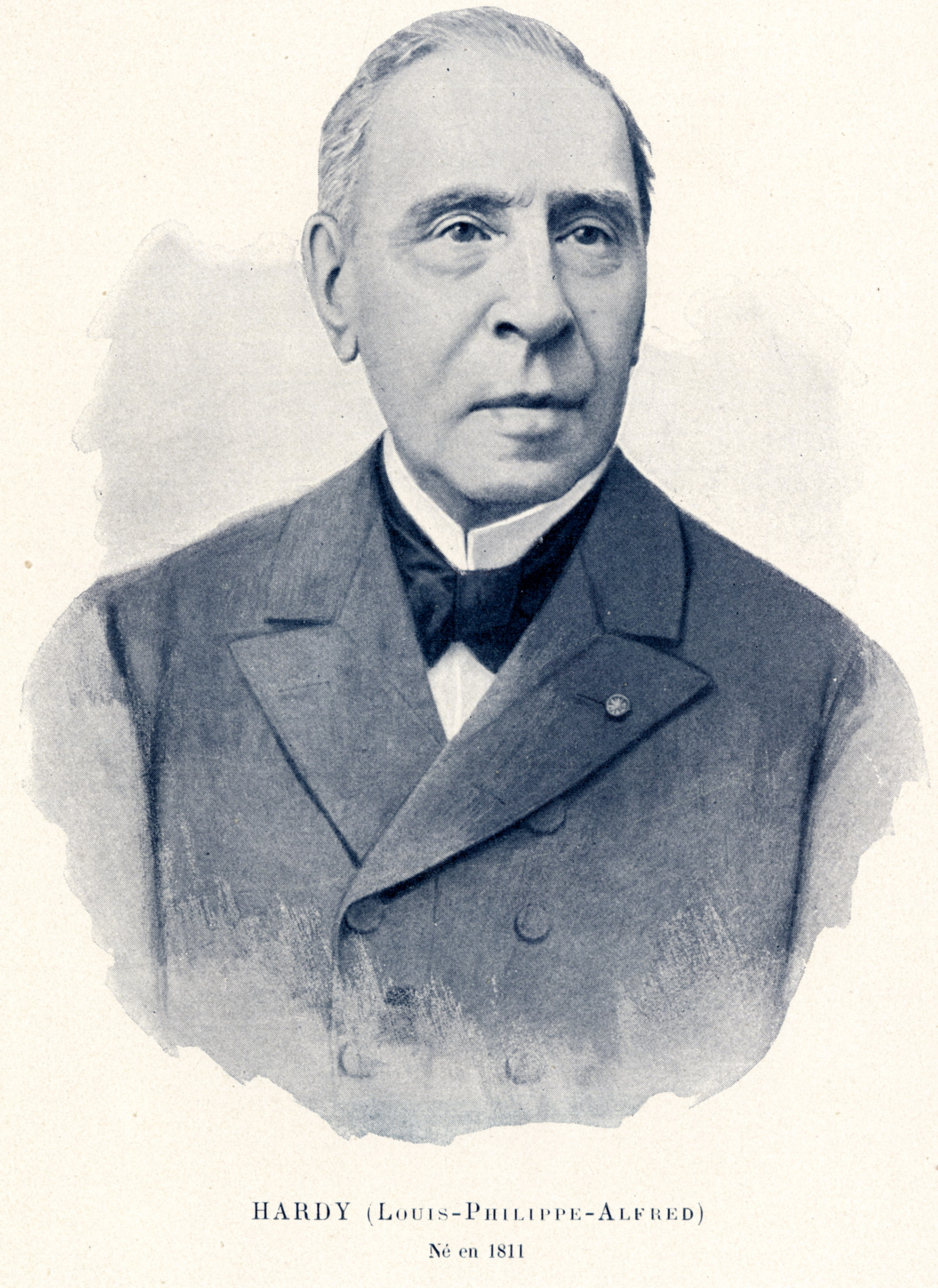
- Portrait of Alfred Hardy
- Born: 30 November 1811; Paris, France
- Died: 23 January 1893 (aged 81); Paris, France

Alfred Louis Philippe Hardy (30 November 1811, Paris – 23 January 1893, Paris) was a French dermatologist.

In 1836 he received his medical doctorate in Paris, where in 1839 he became chef de clinique under Pierre Fouquier at the Hôpital de la Charité. In 1847 he obtained his agrégation at the faculty of medicine in Paris, and four years later, succeeded Jean Guillaume Auguste Lugol as chef de service at the Hôpital Saint-Louis. For several years he held classes in dermatology at the hospital. In 1867 he succeeded Jules Béhier as chair of internal pathology at the university, and in 1876 attained the chair of clinical medicine at Hôpital Necker.

In 1867 he became a member of the Académie de médecine (section for therapy). In 1889 he served as president of the First International Congress of Dermatology and Syphilography.

== Published works ==
In 1868 he published "Clinique photographique de l'Hôpital Saint-Louis", one of the first books on dermatology to use photography (49 original photographs, some of which were hand colored).

- Traité élémentaire de pathologie interne (with Jules Béhier) 3 volumes, 1846–55 – Elementary treatise on internal pathology.
- Leçons sur les maladies de la peau professés a l'hôpital St Louis, 1860 – Lessons on diseases of the skin at the Hôpital Saint-Louis.
- Leçons sur les maladies dartreuses professées à l'hôpital Saint-Louis, 1862 – Lessons on dartrous diseases taught at the Hôpital Saint-Louis.
- Leçons sur la scrofule et les scrofulides et sur la syphilis et les syphilides professées à l'hôpital Saint-Louis, 1864 – Lessons on scrofula, scrofulides, syphilis and syphilides taught at the Hôpital Saint-Louis.
- "The dartrous diathesis, or eczema and its allied affections" : an English translation of Hardy's "Leçons sur les maladies dartreuses" by Henry G. Piffard (1868).
