= Henry Strong =

Henry Strong may refer to:

- Henry Strong (railroad executive), American railroad executive
- Henry A. Strong (1838–1919), American businessman and first president of Eastman Kodak Company
- Henry G. Strong (1873–1919), American businessman
- Henry W. Strong (1810–1848), American politician from New York
