= Governor Strong =

Governor Strong may refer to:

- John Clifford Strong (1922–2003), Governor of the Turks and Caicos from 1978 to 1982
- John Franklin Alexander Strong (1856–1929), 2nd Governor of Alaska Territory from 1913 to 1918
