= Jules Béhier =

French physician

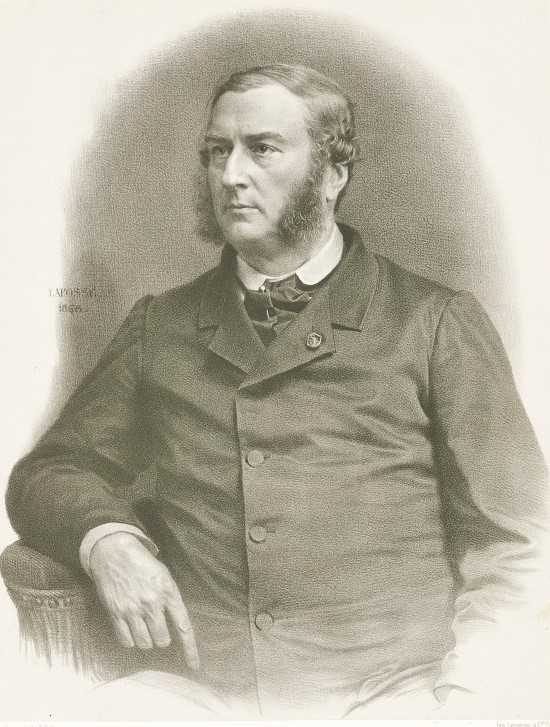
Louis-Jules Béhier

Louis-Jules Félix Béhier (26 August 1813 in Paris – 7 May 1876 in Paris) was a French medical doctor.

In 1837 he received his doctorate at Paris with the dissertation-thesis "Recherches sur quelques points de pathologie". In 1844 he obtained his agrégation and in 1849 became médecin des hôpitaux. In 1864 he attained the chair of internal pathology at the faculty of medicine in Paris. As a professor, he was associated with the Hôpital de la Charité (1864–67), Hôpital Pitié (1867–69) and the Hôtel-Dieu (1869–76). In 1866 he became a member of the Académie nationale de médecine (section for pathological anatomy).

He is credited with the popularization of the hypodermic syringe in France, a device invented in 1853. He is also known for his pioneer experimentation with the opiate narceine, and for his advocacy of hydrotherapy (cold water baths) and alcohol (a "Todd's mixture" containing brandy) for the treatment of typhoid fever. Along with dermatologist Alfred Hardy, he is associated with the eponym "Béhier-Hardy symptom" (also known as "Béhier-Hardy aphonia"), described as the loss of voice as a sign of the early stages of pulmonary gangrene.

== Selected works ==
- Traité élémentaire de pathologie (with Alfred Hardy), (3 volumes, 1844–55).
- Conférences de clinique médicale, faites à la Pitié, 1861-1862 (with Albert Louis Menjaud and Adrien Proust), 1864.
- "A Contribution to the history of Leucemia (Intestinal Leucemia)", (In English, 1868).
- Transfusion du sang : opérée avec succès chez une jeune femme, 1874.
- Sur le traitement du rhumatisme, 1876.
