= Venice Center, New York =

- Hamlet
- Location within New York Location within the United States
- Coordinates: 42°44′21″N 76°33′24″W
- Country: United States
- State: New York
- County: Cayuga
- Elevation: 997 ft (304 m)
- Time zone: UTC-5 (Eastern (EST))
  - Summer (DST): UTC-4 (EDT)
- ZIP code: 13147
- Area codes: 315 & 680
- GNIS feature ID: 968481

Venice Center is a hamlet in Cayuga County, New York, United States. The community is located along New York State Route 34, 13.3 miles (21.4 km) south of Auburn. Venice Center had its own post office until June 14, 1988.
