= Elizabeth Strong =

American painter (1855–1941)

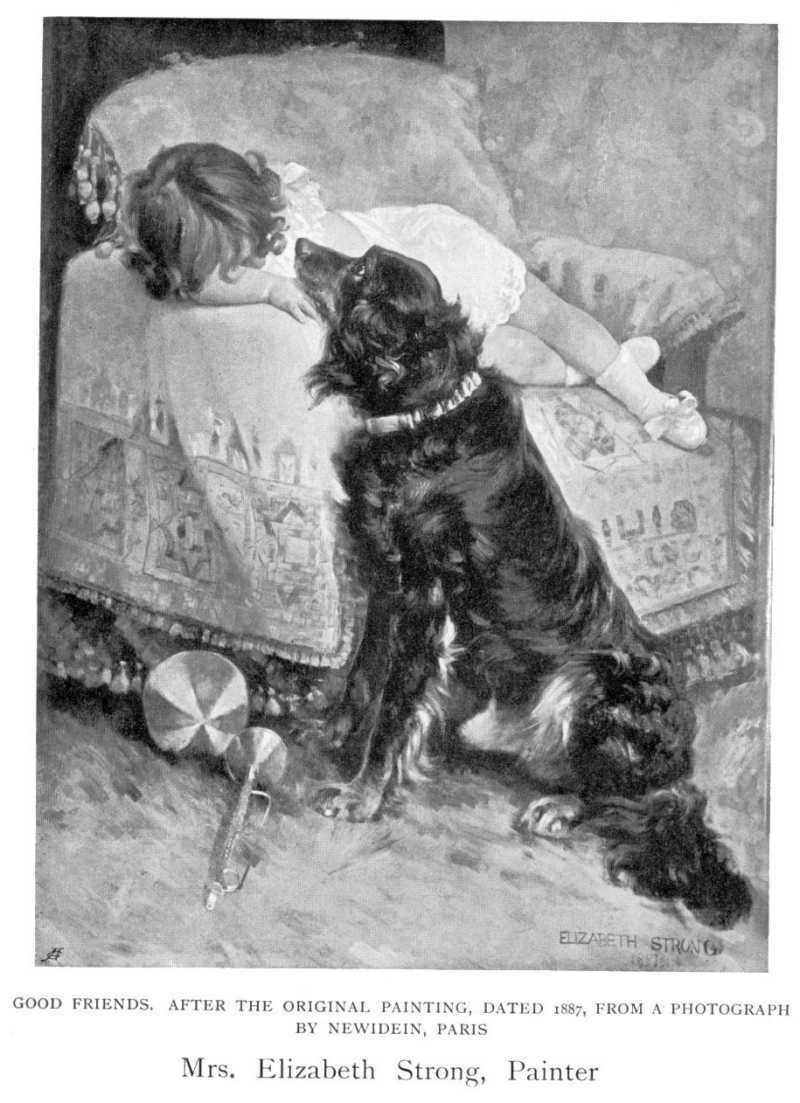
- Elizabeth Strong, Good Friends (1887)
- Born: February 1, 1855; Westport, Connecticut, US
- Died: October 30, 1941 (aged 86); Carmel, California, US
- Education: Shinnecock Hills Summer School of Art; San Francisco Art Institute
- Known for: Painting

Elizabeth Strong (1855–1941) was an American artist, known for landscape, animal and figure paintings. She was nicknamed, "the Rosa Bonheur of America".

== Biography ==
Elizabeth Strong was born on February 1, 1855, in Westport, Connecticut, to parents Margaret Dewing Bixby Strong and Reverend Joseph Dwight Strong. She and her older brother Joseph Dwight Strong Jr. attended California School of Design (now known as San Francisco Art Institute) in the early years of the school, studying with Virgil Macey Williams.

After graduating in 1878, Strong traveled to Monterey, California and met Jules Tavernier, who offered her art studio space. After six months in Monterey, Strong returned to San Francisco and received many commissions for dog portraits. She had a shared art studio with Nellie Hopps at the Old Municipal Court building (Genella Building) at 728 Montgomery Street in San Francisco, it was a building that housed many artists including her former professor Virgil Macey Williams and Jules Tavernier. Around 1881, she traveled to Europe and ended up staying for almost ten years, studying art with many masters. In 1883, she showed her first work at the Paris Salon.

She returned to the United States in 1890, to Boston, Philadelphia, and New York. She studied in the summer of 1894 with William Merritt Chase at Shinnecock Hills Summer School. In 1896, she returned to California, living in both San Francisco and the East Bay. She had never married.

In 1909, Strong participated in the Alaska–Yukon–Pacific Exposition and won a silver medal for her painting of cattle grazing in the Cragmont Hills in North Berkeley.

Her work is included in various public museum collections, including Pennsylvania Academy of the Fine Arts, Crocker Art Museum, Monterey Museum of Art, among others.

Strong came to Carmel-by-the-Sea, California in the 1920s.

Age sits lightly upon her and this diminutive lady walks to Pt. Lobos carrying paint-box and canvas. Walks home again plus a sketch of sea or landscape. Remarkable animal portraits hang in her studio; done in Paris where she was judged one of the best animal painters of her time. One small canvas bears upon its back the writing of Whistler, who coming upon it at exhibit said: "This is Art" whereupon he marked it Class 1. Miss Strong, modest, a nature lover, ever active, believes herself a beginner and remarks that nature holds within her the secrets of great art as well as the wisdom of healthful living.

— Carmel Pine Cone

== Death ==
Strong died in Carmel-by-the-Sea, on October 30, 1941.
