= Henry Piffard =

Henry Granger Piffard
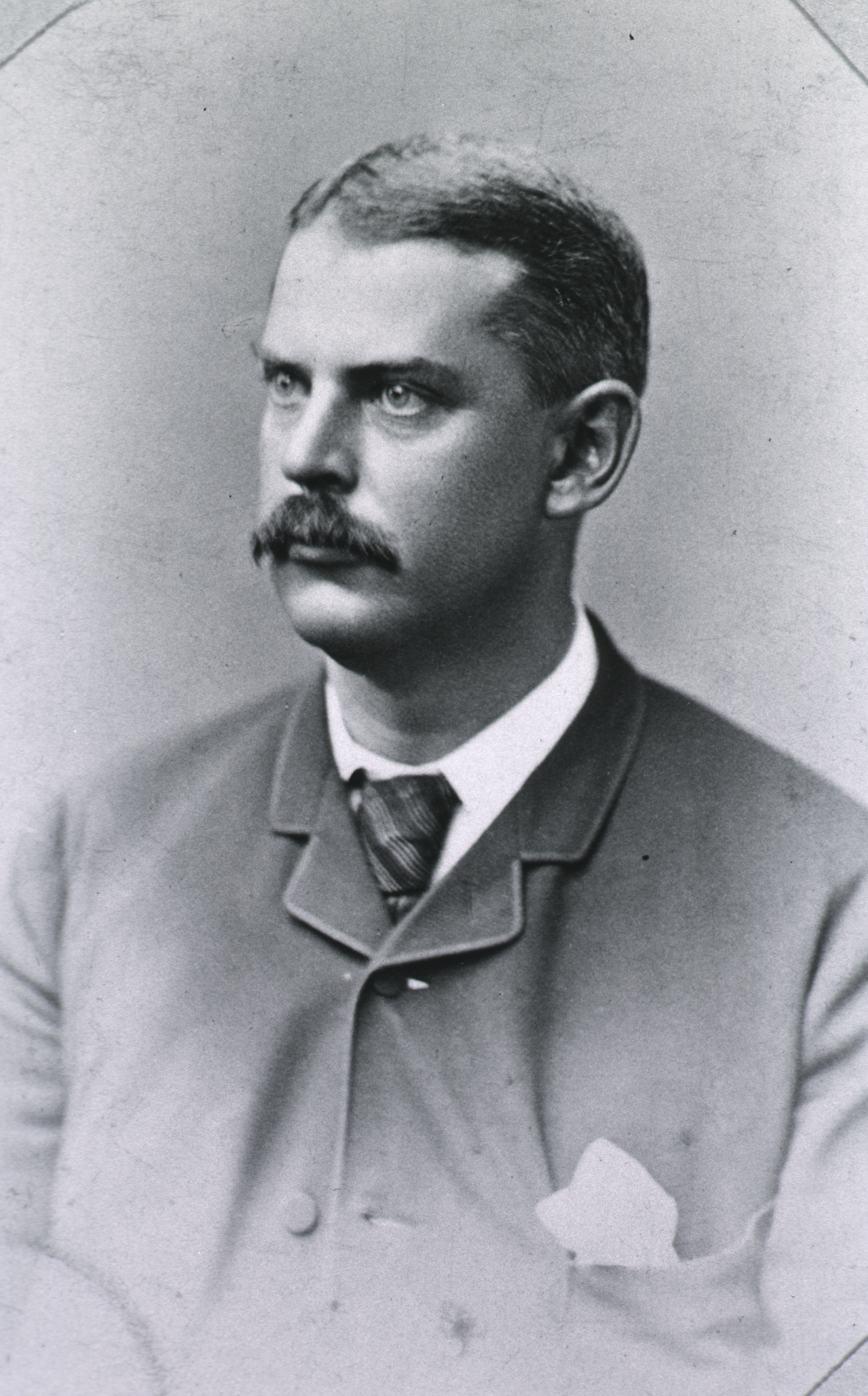
- Born: September 10, 1842; Piffard, New York, US
- Died: June 8, 1910 (aged 67); New York, New York, US
- Education: College of Physicians and Surgeons of New York; University of the City of New York; Churchill Military Academy
- Occupations: dermatologist, pathologist

Henry Granger Piffard (10 September 1842 in Piffard, New York – 8 June 1910 New York City) was author of the first systematic treatise on dermatology in America. He is heralded as one of the founders of dermatology in the U.S., having founded the Journal of Cutaneous and Venereal Diseases, which later became JAMA Dermatology. He invented the dermal curette, was the first to use x-ray to treat skin diseases and was a pioneer of flash photography in medicine.

== Life and career ==
Henry Granger Piffard was born in Piffard, Livingston County, New York, on September 10, 1842, his paternal ancestors coming from Dauphiné, France, and his mother's being of Dutch extraction.

He was educated at the Churchill Military Academy at Ling and at the University of the City of New York, where he took his A. B. 1862 and A. M. 1865 and his M. D. at the College of Physicians and Surgeons of New York, in 1865, serving as intern at Bellevue Hospital. He specialized in skin diseases. He married, in 1868, Helen Hart, daughter of Gen. William Kerley Strong, of New York.

His appointments included: surgeon to the New York Dispensary for Diseases of the Skin, and professor of dermatology in the University of the City of New York. In 1862 he served for a short time with the Sanitary Commission on the James River, Virginia. He won distinction as a microscopist, pathologist and electro-therapeutist and had inventive capacity as well as mechanical ingenuity. His membership included the New York County Medical Society; the New York Academy of Medicine; the New York Dermatological Society, of which he was president in 1876.

As part of his autodidactic endeavor at a time when the English-language literature on dermatology was scarce, Piffard collected works on skin diseases in German and French.

He died of pneumonia in New York, June 8, 1910.

== Bibliography ==
Piffard translated Alfred Hardy's The Dartrous Diathesis, or Eczema and its Allied Affections (1862) about eczema, lichen, psoriasis and pityriasis (dandruff) from French in 1868. Later, he authored some of the first extensive works on dermatology available in English. He contributed to Hady's dartrous diathesis theory, i.e., the link between above-mentioned skin diseases and rheumatism.

- A Guide to Urinary Analysis (1873)
- An Elementary Treatise on Diseases of the Skin (1871)
- A Treatise on the Materia Medica and Therapeutics of the Skin (1881)
- A Practical Treatise on Diseases of the Skin (1891)
