= Strong's Block =

- U.S. National Register of Historic Places
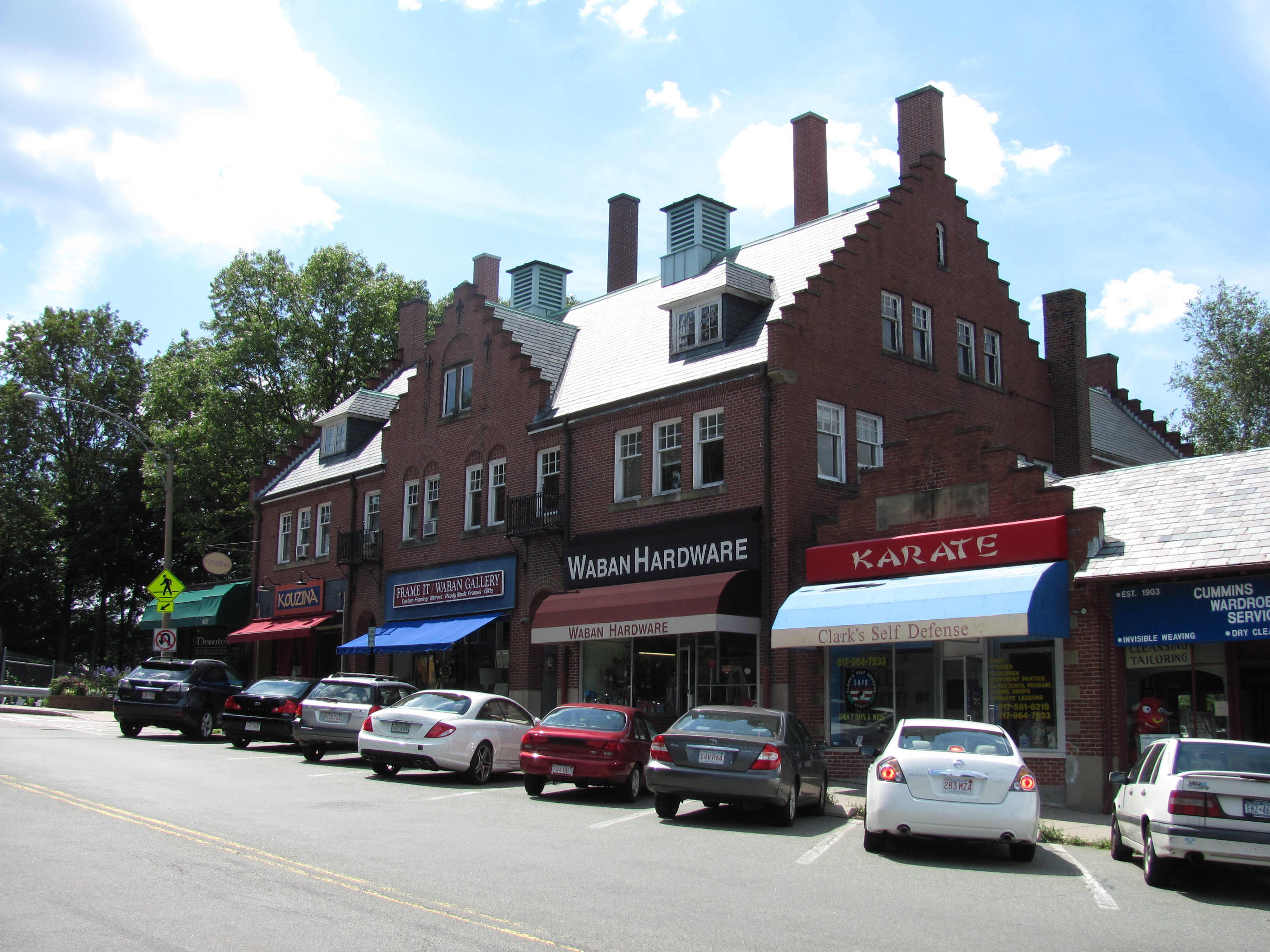
- Strong's Block

- Location within Massachusetts Location within the United States
- Location: 1637--1651 Beacon St., Newton, Massachusetts
- Coordinates: 42°19′35.6″N 71°13′51.8″W
- Built: 1896
- Architect: Bacon, Lewis H.
- Architectural style: Colonial Revival, Dutch Colonial Revival
- MPS: Newton MRA
- NRHP reference No.: 86001891
- Added to NRHP: September 04, 1986

Strong's Block is a historic commercial building at 1637–1651 Beacon Street in the center of Waban Village, in the city of Newton, Massachusetts. Built in 1896, this 2 1/2-story brick Flemish Revival structure is one of a small number of surviving 19th century commercial blocks in the city. The building was designed by Waban resident Lewis H. Bacon for William Strong, another local resident, who sought to capitalize on the construction of the nearby Circuit Railroad (now the MBTA Green Line D branch).

The building was listed on the National Register of Historic Places in 1986.

== See also ==
- National Register of Historic Places listings in Newton, Massachusetts
