= Martin Dusinberre =

Martin Dusinberre is a professor and the chair for global history at the University of Zurich. Before attaining this position in 2015, he was a lecturer in Modern Japanese History at Newcastle University and a postdoctoral researcher at Heidelberg University. Next to his academic publications, which focus on the social history of modern Japan and the history of shipping and sea travel, he has written editorial pieces for Reuters, the History Workshop, and The Guardian. In 2018 he developed an exhibition in cooperation with the Johann Jacobs Museum in Zurich: "A Painting for the Emperor. Japanese Labourers on Sugar Plantations in Hawai’i" centered on a painting by Joseph Dwight Strong and dealt with his current research about the Japanese in Hawaii.

He is a member of the Editorial Board for Past & Present.

== Bibliography ==
- Dusinberre, Martin. Unread relics of a transnational 'hometown' in rural western Japan. Japan Forum 2008, 20(3), 305–335.
- Dusinberre, Martin and Daniel P. Aldrich. Hatoko Comes Home: Civil Society and Nuclear Power in Japan. The Journal of Asian Studies 2011, 70(3), 683–705.
- Dusinberre, Martin. Hard Times in the Hometown: A History of Community Survival in Modern Japan (University of Hawaii Press, 2012)
- Dusinberre, Martin. Writing the On-board: Meiji Japan in Transit and Transition. Journal of Global History 2016, 11(2).
