= George Strong =

George Strong may refer to:

- George Strong (VC) (1833–1888), British recipient of the Victoria Cross in the Crimean War
- George Templeton Strong (composer) (1856–1948), American composer
- George Crockett Strong (1832–1863), American major general during the American Civil War
- George Templeton Strong (1820–1875), his son, diarist during the American Civil War, worked at Cadwalader, Wickersham and Taft
- George Veazey Strong (1880–1946), U.S. general during World War II
- George Strong (footballer) (1916–1989), English association football player
