= Richard Strong Cottage =

Historic house in New Hampshire, United States

- U.S. National Register of Historic Places
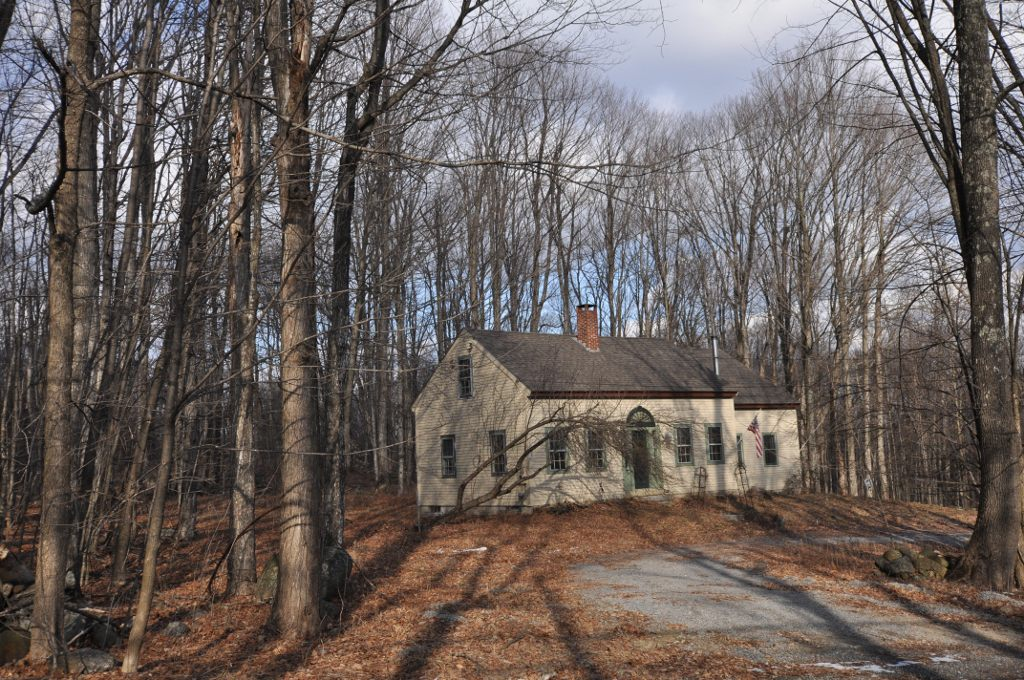

- Location within New Hampshire Location within the United States
- Location: 35 Gowing Lane, Dublin, New Hampshire
- Coordinates: 42°54′12″N 72°1′37″W
- Area: 0.3 acres (0.12 ha)
- Built: 1767
- Architectural style: Cape Colonial
- MPS: Dublin MRA
- NRHP reference No.: 83004081
- Added to NRHP: December 15, 1983

The Richard Strong Cottage is a historic house at 35 Gowing Lane in Dublin, New Hampshire. Probably built about 1767, and reconstructed in 1805, it is a well-preserved example of a vernacular farmstead. The house was listed on the National Register of Historic Places in 1983.

== Description and history ==
The Richard Strong Cottage is located on the north side of Gowing Lane, a now dead-end lane that was historically part of the main highway between Dublin and Peterborough (now bypassed by New Hampshire Route 101). It is a modest 1 1/2-story frame structure, with a gabled roof, central chimney, and clapboarded exterior. It has a five-bay front facade, with sash windows arranged symmetrically around the entrance. The entrance is flanked by sidelight windows and topped by a modern Federal style wooden fan.

This house was probably built c. 1767 by Silas Strong, one of Dublin's first settlers, as it sat on land he originally owned. It was reconstructed near its current site c. 1805 by Captain Richard Strong, whose house stands nearby. The two houses frequently had shared ownership. Strong gave this house to his daughter and son-in-law, Mary and Jonathan Smith, in 1844, and it was sold out of the family by 1880. It was moved a few hundred feet east, to its present location, in 1980, at which time a small ell was removed.

== See also ==
- National Register of Historic Places listings in Cheshire County, New Hampshire
