= Jedediah Strong II House =

Building in Vermont, United States

- Jedediah II Strong House
- U.S. National Register of Historic Places
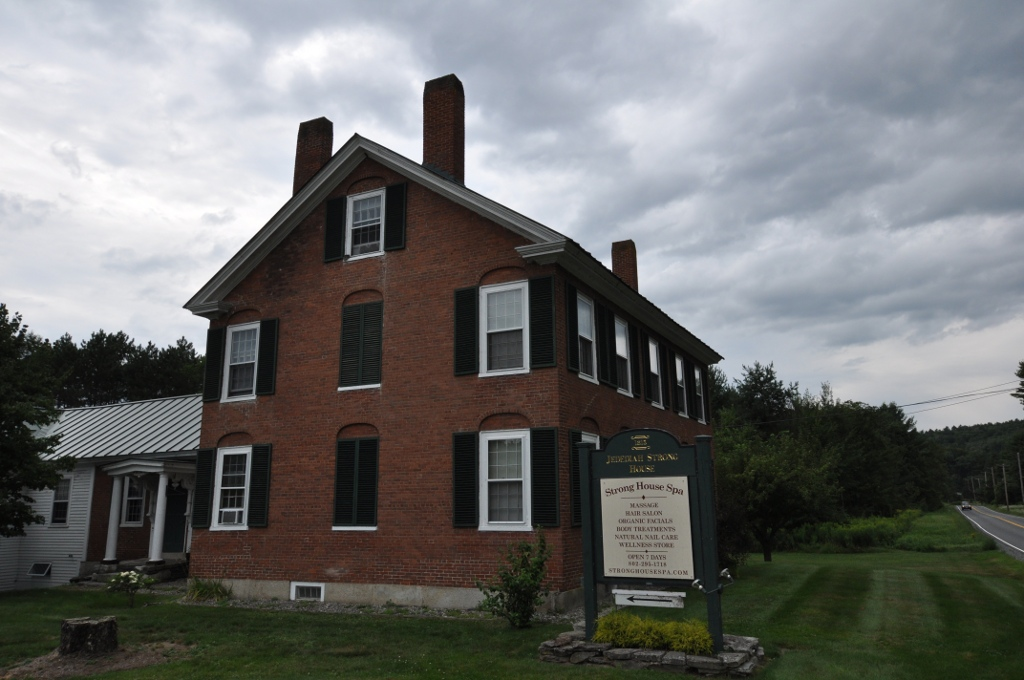

- Location within Vermont Location within the United States
- Location: Quechee Main St. and Dewey's Mills Rd., Hartford, Vermont
- Coordinates: 43°38′44″N 72°24′2″W
- Area: less than one acre
- Built: 1815
- Built by: Strong, Jedediah II
- Architectural style: Federal
- NRHP reference No.: 74000272
- Added to NRHP: August 13, 1974

The Jedediah Strong II House is a historic house at the junction of Quechee Main Street and Dewey's Mill Road in Hartford, Vermont. Built in 1815 by a local mill owner, it is a fine local example of a high-style Federal period brick house. It was listed on the National Register of Historic Places in 1974. It now houses professional offices.

== Description and history ==
The Strong House stands in what is now a relatively rural area east of the village of Quechee, at the southwest corner of Quechee Main Street and Deweys Mills Road. It is a 2 1/2-story brick building, with a gabled roof and stone foundation. A period 1 1/2-story brick ell extends to the rear (south), to which a modern wood-frame ell has been attached. The main facade, facing Quechee Main Street, is five bays wide, with sash windows set in rectangular openings. The openings on the ground floor are topped by blind arches. The main entrance is set in a wider arched opening, with flanking sidelight windows exhibiting tracery, and a multilight arched transom window above. The interior retains original Federal period woodwork, including paneling, chair rails, and a partially hung circular staircase in the main hall.

The house was probably built not long after Jedediah Strong purchased the land in 1815. Strong, a descendant of one of Hartford's earliest settlers, was a prominent local landowner who operated a successful sawmill and gristmill nearby. The house was acquired by the United States Army Corps of Engineers as it was in the vicinity of the North Hartland Dam flood control project. It now houses professional offices.

== See also ==
- National Register of Historic Places listings in Windsor County, Vermont
