= Charles Strong (priest) =

Irish Anglican priest

Charles Strong was an Irish Anglican priest.

Strong was born in Dublin and educated at Trinity College in that city. He was Archdeacon of Glendalough from 1847 until 1857.
