= Strong Hall (Lawrence, Kansas) =

- U.S. National Register of Historic Places
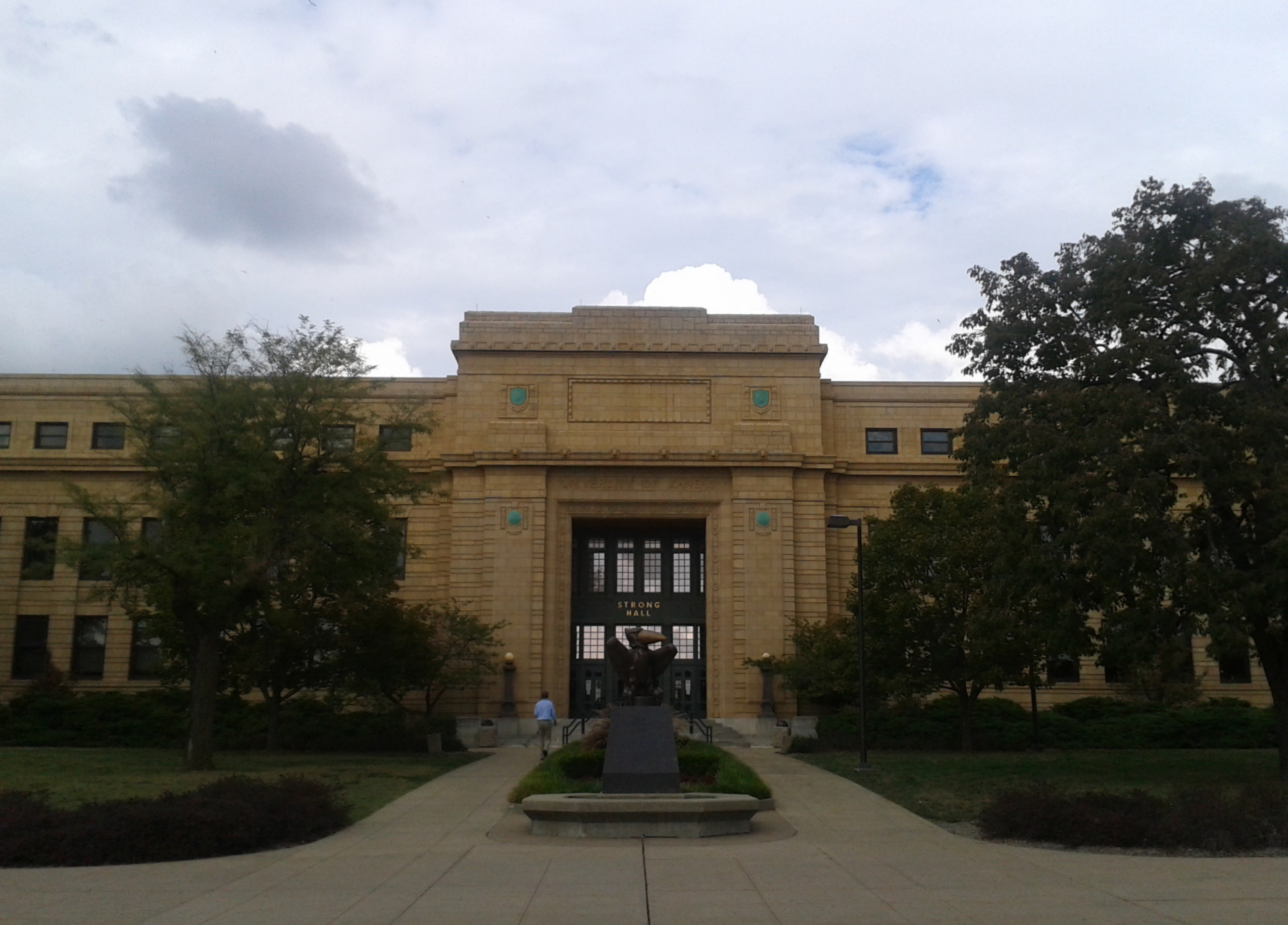
- Strong Hall

- Location within Kansas Location within the United States
- Location: 213 Strong Hall, U. of Kansas, Jct. Jayhawk Dr. and Poplar Ln. Lawrence, Kansas
- Coordinates: 38°57′35″N 95°14′48″W
- Area: Less than one acre
- Built: 1911
- Architects: McArdle, Montrose Pallen
- Architectural style: Classical Revival
- NRHP reference No.: 98001174
- Added to NRHP: September 18, 1998

Strong Hall is an administrative hall at the University of Kansas in Lawrence, Kansas, United States. The hall is on the National Register of Historic Places.

== History ==
After 1900, rising enrollments overwhelmed the Old Fraser Hall, known at the time as the "university building", necessitating the construction of a new administration and academic center. Chancellor Frank H. Strong (1902–1920) began requesting financing from the Kansas Legislature for the new structure. Montrose Pallen McArdle, a St. Louis architectural company, was chosen to design the building that Strong and the regents anticipated would be "the center of the university architecture as well as the university life".

Under the advisement of State Architect John Stanton, art professor William A. Griffith, and College Dean Olin Templin, McArdle designed a $500,000 classical Renaissance building that included pillars, a rotunda, an art gallery, and a classical museum. The Kansas Legislature objected to the scope and cost, and the designs were curtailed, while remnants of the original design vision remain; the building was ultimately finished in a Classical Revival style.
