= William Kerley Strong =

American merchant and brigadier general

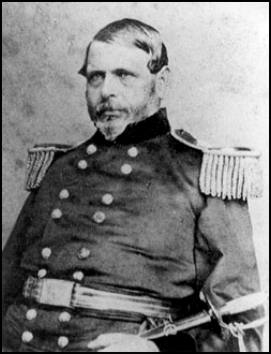
- Born: April 30, 1805; Duanesburg, New York
- Died: March 16, 1867 (aged 61) New York
- Allegiance: United States of America: Union
- Branch: Union Army
- Service years: 1861–1863
- Rank: Brigadier General
- Commands: District of Cairo; District of St. Louis
- Conflicts: American Civil War
- Spouse: Helen Mary Hart
- Children: John Lorimer
- Other work: merchant

William Kerley Strong (1805–1867) was a merchant and a brigadier general during the American Civil War. He was the commander of Benton Barracks and the districts of Cairo and St. Louis. Strong was also a prominent Democrat, noted his pro-Union speeches.

== Biography ==
Strong was a wealthy wool merchant in New York. He was born on April 30, 1805, in Duanesburg, New York to Josiah Strong and Martha Green. Strong's father was an American Revolutionary War veteran who had fought in the Battle of Trenton under George Washington.

Strong was married to Helen Mary Hart and they had 9 children, among whom John Lorimer, and Helen Hart, spouse of Henry Piffard.

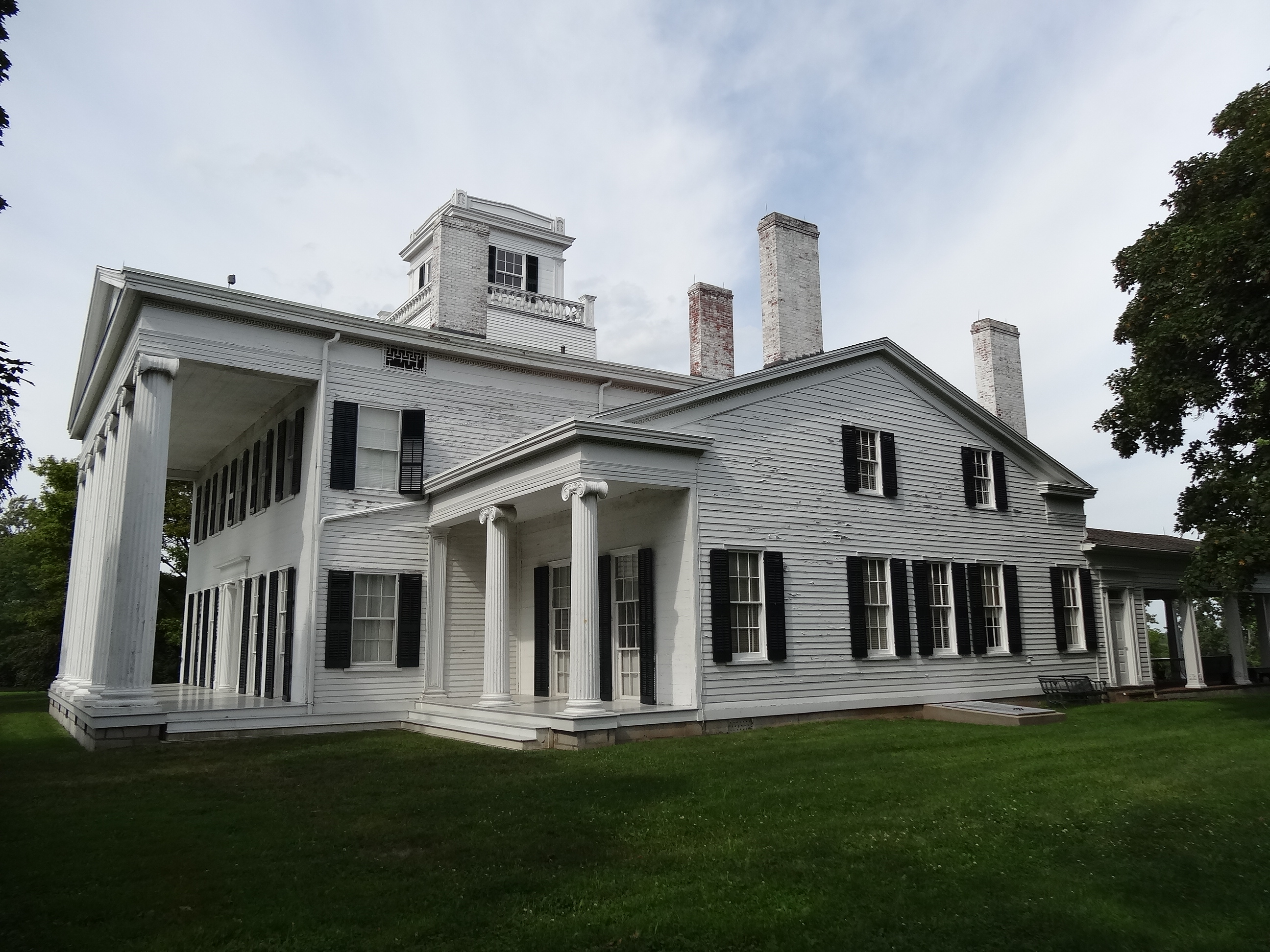
Strong built the Rose Hill Mansion in the Empire style popular during the Greek revival period.

In 1839, Strong was noted for constructing a sprawling grand mansion covering 11,634 feet of living space. The property called Rose Hill Mansion was given to Robert Swan in 1850. A contemporaneous newspaper report cited that the property, which was designated a national historic landmark, was sold to Swan's father, who gave it to him as a wedding present.

Strong died on March 16, 1867. He never recovered from his injuries after he was thrown out of his carriage.

== Civil War ==
When the American Civil War began, Strong was travelling around Egypt. He helped the Union cause by securing weapons in France on his way home. An account cited that because of his pro-Union speeches, he gained the attention of Abraham Lincoln, who appointed him as brigadier general. He was not assigned to field duty but made commander of the Benton Barracks in Missouri. In 1862, he was appointed commander of the District of Cairo, Illinois, replacing General Eleazar A. Paine, who was reassigned for violating orders. Strong was sent to New York for an unknown mission before he was appointed the commander of the District of St. Louis from June to October 1863. He resigned his commission on October 20.

Strong was also appointed as the president of a commission that investigated the circumstances behind the evacuation of the Union forces in New Madrid, Missouri.

After the war, he settled in New York and started employing Black workers.
