= Weak =

Weak may refer to:

== Songs ==
- "Weak" (AJR song), 2016
- "Weak" (Melanie C song), 2011
- "Weak" (SWV song), 1993
- "Weak" (Skunk Anansie song), 1995
- "Weak", a song by Seether from Seether: 2002-2013

== Television episodes ==
- "Weak" (Fear the Walking Dead)
- "Weak" (Law & Order: Special Victims Unit)

== See also ==
- Stephen Uroš V of Serbia (1336–1371), also known as Stefan Uroš the Weak, King of Serbia and Emperor of the Serb and Greeks
- Kenyan Weaks (born 1977), American retired basketball player
- Weakness (disambiguation)
- Week
