= Tommy Strong =

English footballer

Personal information
- Full name: Thomas Philips Strong
- Date of birth: 1890
- Place of birth: Newcastle upon Tyne, England
- Date of death: 15 July 1917 (aged 27)
- Place of death: West Flanders, Belgium
- Height: 5 ft 8 1/2 in (1.74 m)
- Positions: Left back; left half

Senior career*
Years	Team	Apps	(Gls)
1914–1915	Lincoln City	8	(0)
- * Club domestic league appearances and goals

Thomas Philips Strong (1890 – 15 July 1917) was an English professional footballer who played as a left back and left half in the Football League for Lincoln City.

== Personal life ==
As of 1911, Strong was working as a grocer's manager. He served as a private in the South Staffordshire Regiment during the First World War and died of wounds sustained in West Flanders on 15 July 1917. Strong was buried in Croisilles Railway Cemetery.

== Career statistics ==
Appearances and goals by club, season and competition
Club	Season	League			FA Cup		Total	
Club	Season	Division	Apps	Goals	Apps	Goals	Apps	Goals
Lincoln City	1913–14	Second Division	1	0	0	0	1	0
Lincoln City	1914–15	Second Division	7	0	0	0	7	0
Career total			8	0	0	0	8	0
