= Robert William Strong Jr. =

United States Air Force general (1917–2006)

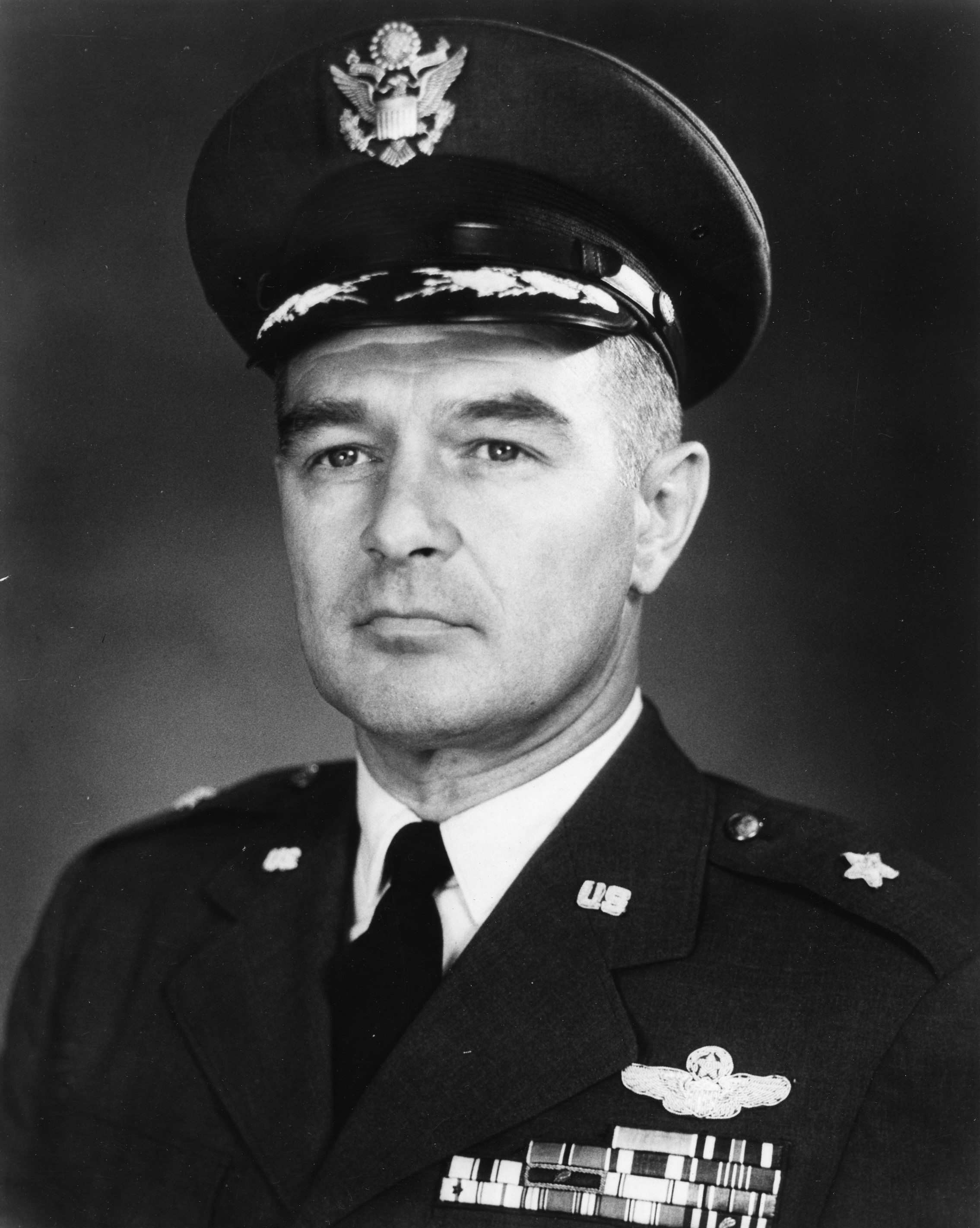
- Robert W. Strong, Legion of Merit recipient
- Born: November 23, 1917
- Died: March 16, 2006 (aged 88)
- Military career
- Allegiance: United States of America
- Branch: United States Air Force
- Service years: 1936-1970
- Rank: Major general
- Conflicts: World War II
- Awards: Bronze Star; Legion of Merit; Distinguished Flying Cross; Distinguished Service Medal

Robert William Strong Jr. (November 23, 1917 – March 16, 2006) was an American Major general and Legion of Merit recipient.

== Biography ==
Robert Strong was born on November 23, 1917, in Painseville, Ohio. His father, Robert William Strong Sr., was a member of the class the stars fell on at West Point, who ended his career as a Brigadier General.

Strong graduated from Valley Forge Military Academy at Wayne, Pennsylvania and in July 1936 entered the United States Military Academy at West Point. Four years later he graduated from there as a second lieutenant and in October of the same year began flight training at Kelly Field, Texas where he also got his Aircrew Badge in September 1941. In December of the same year he was a bomber aircraft operations officer for the 41st Bombardment Group at Hammer Field, California. Later on, 47th Bombardment Group at Visalia went also under his command. In August 1942, he went to Topeka, Kansas where he trained 333rd Bomb Group and the same year moved to Salina, Kansas where he did the same thing with the 346th Bomb Group. In January 1943 he took command of Salina's 504th Bombardment Group and the same year moved back to Topeka.

From March 1943 to February 1944 he served as an operations officer for the 2nd Heavy Bombardment Processing Headquarters and 3rd Heavy Bombardment Processing Headquarters at Topeka's 272nd Base Unit. In June 1944 Strong came back to Salina and became a commander of the 62nd Bombardment Group which played an important strategic role in South West Pacific Theater. Later on he was transferred to command the 39th Bombardment Group which was stationed on the island of Guam. During this time, his B-29s' squadron bombarded Japan for 200 hours. He came back to the United States in October 1945 and served as tactical officer at the U.S. Military Academy till July 1948. In August 1952 Strong became an assistant air attaché to Canada and then got enrolled into the Naval War College at Newport, Rhode Island. When he graduated from the War College in June 1953 he became a general at the Headquarters of the United States Air Force in Washington, D.C.

In November 1961 Strong came back to the United States and became a commander of the 825th Strategic Aerospace Division which was stationed in Little Rock, Arkansas. There, he remained till March 1963 when he became commandant of cadets at the U.S. Air Force Academy in Colorado. Two years later in July, he came back to SAC and was an 817th Air Division commander there at Pease Air Force Base in New Hampshire. In July 1966, in the same place, he also served as a chief of staff for the Eighth Air Force where he remained till he retired on May 1, 1970. Strong died on March 16, 2006.
