= William Strong (Oregon judge) =

American judge

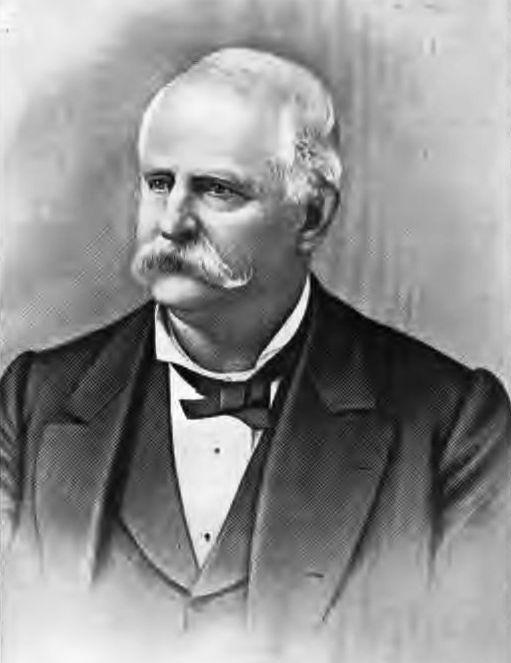

4th Justice of the Oregon Supreme Court
- In office 1850–1853
- Appointed by: Zachary Taylor
- Preceded by: Peter Hardeman Burnett
- Succeeded by: Cyrus Olney

Associate Justice of the Washington Supreme Court
- In office 1858–1861

Personal details
- Born: July 15, 1817 St. Albans, Vermont
- Died: April 10, 1887 (aged 69) Portland, Oregon
- Spouse: Lucretia Robinson

William Strong (July 15, 1817 – April 10, 1887) was an American attorney and jurist in the Pacific Northwest. He was the 4th justice of the Oregon Supreme Court when the region was still the Oregon Territory. A native of Vermont, he settled in the Washington Territory after it was created in 1853 and served in the legislature of that territory and on the Washington Supreme Court. Later he returned to Oregon and settled in Portland.

== Early life ==
Strong was born on July 15, 1817, in St. Albans, Vermont to Laura Strong and Henry Pierce Strong, a preacher. He earned his primary education near the town of Rushville, New York, before entering Yale College (now university) at the age of seventeen. William graduated from Yale in 1838 and then began teaching while also studying law. At Yale he graduated with honors and then after graduation served as a principal at a school in Ithaca, New York. There in 1840 he married Lucretia Robinson, and the couple would have six children together. Then in 1840 he passed the bar and started practicing law in Cleveland, Ohio where the couple remained until 1849.

== Political career ==
In August 1850 William Strong arrived in the Oregon Territory after being appointed by President Taylor to the Oregon Supreme Court the previous year. The trip to Oregon for the family started aboard the ship Supply that took them around Cape Horn on the southern tip of South America to San Francisco, California where they transferred to a sloop-of-war vessel named the Falmouth that delivered them to Astoria, Oregon on August 13. On the trip were also Strong's wife and two children, the new secretary for the territory Edward D. Hamilton, and the new governor John P. Gaines, but Strong' oldest son Frederick died after contracting Yellow Fever in Rio de Janeiro, Brazil. The Strong family would then settle on a farm in Cathlamet on the Columbia River where William would file a land claim under the Donation Land Claim Act on September 27.

Once in Oregon, Strong served on the supreme court from 1850 to 1853. His assigned district was the third, which covers all of modern Washington state where he served as a circuit riding trial level judge and as an appeals level justice. He replaced Peter H. Burnett who had served under the provisional government, but declined to serve on the territorial court. Strong's first trial was held on November 12, 1850, in Lewis County near present-day Chehalis, Washington at the home of John Jackson. His brother James served as William's court clerk while riding circuit. His annual salary for his services was $2,000. In 1853, when Washington Territory was formed out of the northern portion of the Oregon Territory, Strong became the sole judge in the territory until his term ended in November.

That November he left the bench and returned to farming at Cathlamet. William Strong then served as a surveyor of a large section of land in the territory. Next on February 27, 1854, Washington Territory Governor Isaac Stevens appointed Strong, along with Edward Lander and Victor Monroe, to help write the new territory's laws. After this Stevens then asked Strong to serve as his legal adviser. Next, 1855 when war with the Native Americans broke out he joined the militia and was assigned to Fort Vancouver as a commander of a company of cavalry. While in command he and his troops were ordered out to return the Cowlitz tribe to the protection of the fort, as the tribe was sequestered at the fort to protect them from possible white violence during the Yakima Wars. The Cowlitz had fled after fearing an American attack after a false rumor had spread that the Cowlitz were preparing to attack American settlements. Strong was able to negotiate with the tribe and bring them back, but his men fired shots in the air in celebration that was misconstrued by nearby listeners as an actual engagement. This incident is how Battle Ground, Washington received its name.

In 1856, Strong was elected to the territorial Washington House of Representatives as a Democrat, as the Whig Party he had previously been associated with was no longer a relevant political entity. While in the house he represented Wahkiakum County and made an unsuccessful bid for Congress. Strong served in the territorial legislature until 1858 when he was appointed to the Washington Supreme Court, serving until 1861. President James Buchanan appointed him to the post on the high court of the Washington Territory.

== Personal life ==
On the farm at Cathlamet the family built a log cabin in early 1851, and then a frame house that was completed in March 1853. At the farm Judge Strong purchased a Native American girl named Wahkeenah as a slave to assist his wife with household tasks. Once retired from public service, in December 1862 the Strong family moved to Portland, Oregon where William returned to private law practice. There he served as general counsel for the Oregon Steam Navigation Company until 1879 when the company was sold. Then in 1883 he retired from the legal profession. Eventually his sons took over his legal practice and William Strong died on April 10, 1887, in Portland.
