= Robert William Strong Sr. =

US Army general (1890–1975)

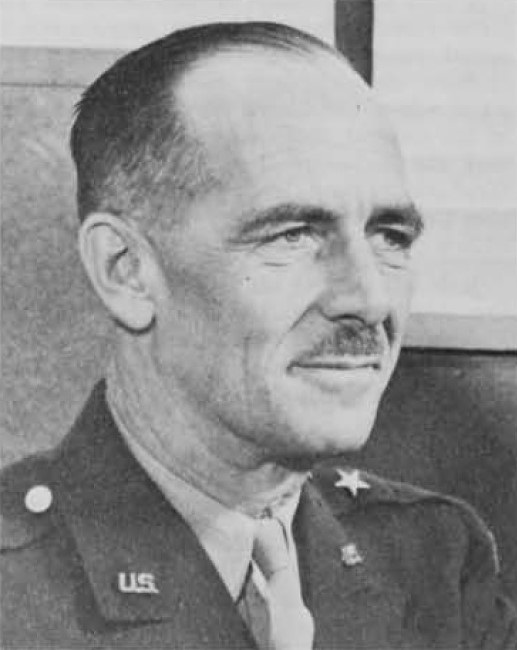
- Born: March 12, 1890; Kingsville, Ohio, U.S.
- Died: October 16, 1975 (aged 85); Tucson, Arizona, U.S.
- Burial place: West Point Cemetery
- Education: United States Military Academy
- Occupation: Military officer
- Awards: Legion of Merit

Robert William Strong Sr. (March 12, 1890 – October 16, 1975) was an American brigadier general.

== Biography ==
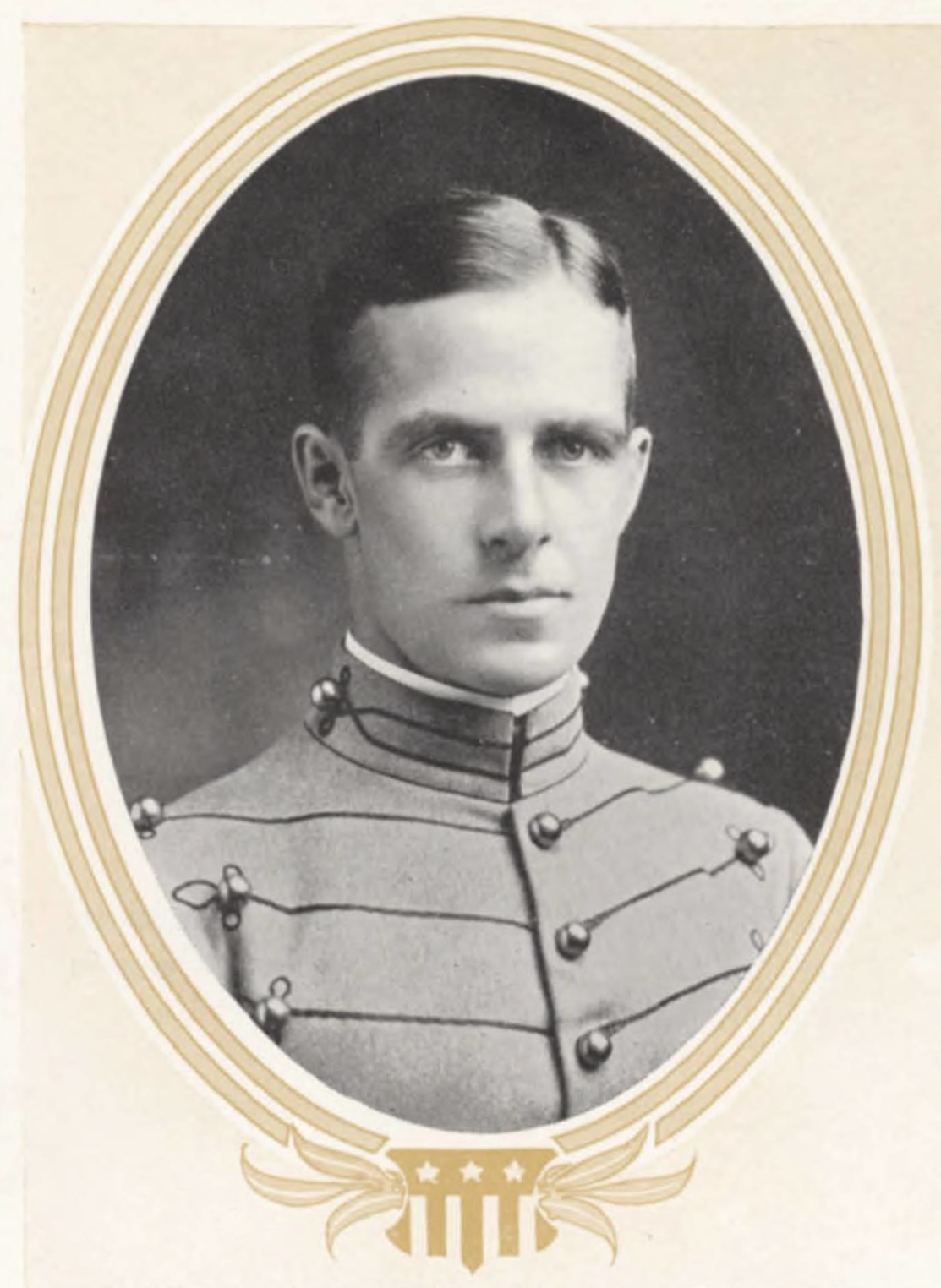
At West Point in 1915

Robert William Strong was born in Kingsville, Ohio on March 12, 1890, and raised in Painesville, Ohio. After attending the Case Institute of Technology for two years, he entered the United States Military Academy at West Point in June 1911. Strong was a member of the class the stars fell on at West Point in June 1915, graduating into the 2nd Cavalry as a Second Lieutenant. While a student, he participated in baseball, ice hockey and polo. Strong played goaltender for the hockey squad and served as team captain during his senior year.

Strong served as a Major of field artillery during World War I, and served as Chief of Staff of the United States Army Forces in North Africa during World War II. He graduated from the Command and General Staff School at Fort Leavenworth in June 1928, the Saumur Cavalry School in France in September 1929 and the Army War College at Washington Barracks in June 1934. Strong retired on March 31, 1950.

After retirement, Strong and his wife spent their winters in Tucson, Arizona and their summers in western Quebec. He died in Tucson on October 16, 1975, and was buried at West Point Cemetery.

Strong's son, Robert William Strong Jr., became a major general, serving as chief of staff for the Eighth Air Force. Another son, First Lieutenant Gordon Malin Strong, was killed in the Korean War in 1950.
