= Granola =

Breakfast, lunch and snack food

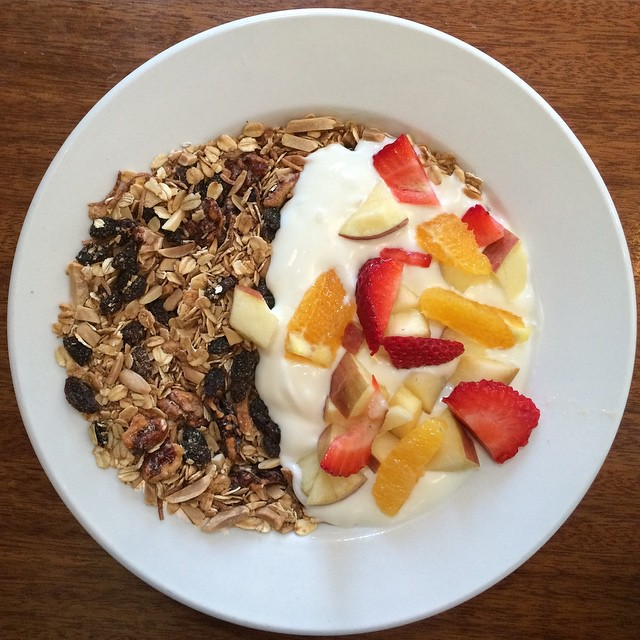
- Granola served with yogurt and fresh fruit
- Type: Granola
- Place of origin: United States
- Main ingredients: Rolled oats, nuts, seeds, honey or other sweeteners

Granola is a food consisting of a mix of rolled oats, nuts, seeds, honey (or other sweeteners such as brown sugar), and sometimes puffed rice that is usually baked with oil until crisp, toasted and golden brown, sometimes forming clumps. The mixture is stirred while baking to avoid burning and to maintain a loose breakfast cereal consistency. Dried fruit, such as raisins and dates, and confections such as chocolate are often added.

Granola is often eaten in combination with yogurt, honey, fresh fruit (such as bananas, strawberries or blueberries), milk, or even with other forms of cereal. It also serves as a topping for various pastries, desserts or ice cream. Granola is similar to muesli, except the latter is traditionally neither sweetened nor baked.

Granola is sometimes taken when hunting, fishing, hiking, camping, or backpacking because it is lightweight, high in calories, ready-to-eat, and easy to store (properties that make it similar to trail mix). Manufacturers also add additional honey, corn syrup, or maple syrup to it and compress it into granola bars, which are easy to carry for packed lunches, hiking, or other outdoor activities.

== History ==
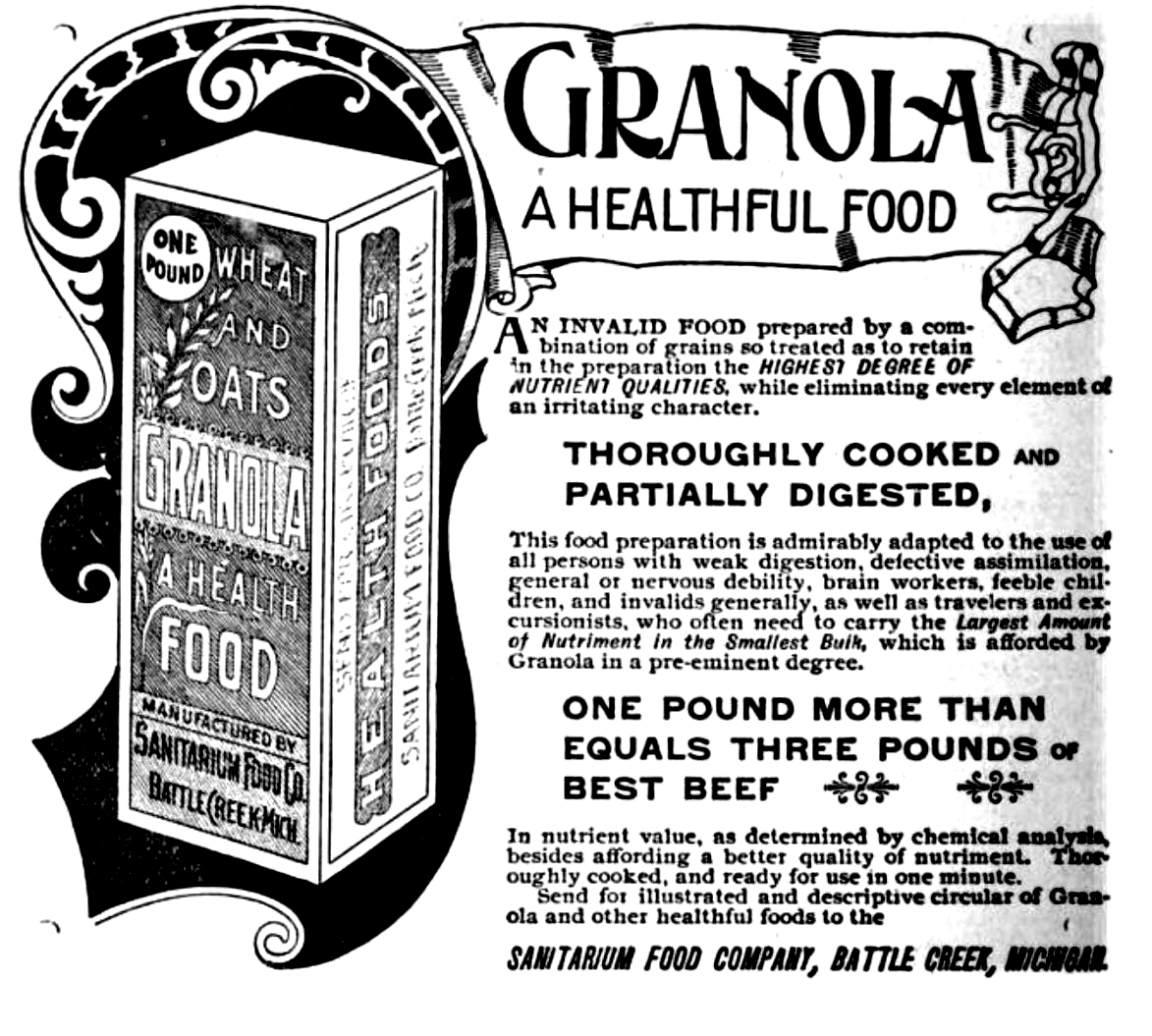
An 1893 advertisement for Kellogg's Granola

Granula was invented in Dansville, New York, by Dr. James Caleb Jackson at the Jackson Sanitarium in 1863. The Jackson Sanitarium was a prominent health spa that operated into the early 20th century on the hillside overlooking Dansville. It was also known as Our Home on the Hillside; thus the company formed to sell Jackson's cereal was known as the Our Home Granula Company. Granula was composed of Graham flour and was similar to an oversized form of Grape-Nuts. A similar cereal was developed by John Harvey Kellogg. It was also initially known as Granula, but the name was changed to Granola to avoid legal problems with Jackson.

The food and name were revived in the 1960s, and fruits and nuts were added to it to make it a health food that was popular with the health and nature-oriented hippie movement. Due to this connection, the descriptors "granola" and "crunchy-granola" have entered colloquial use as a way to label people and things associated with the movement.

Another major promoter was Layton Gentry, profiled in Time as "Johnny Granola-Seed". In 1964, Gentry sold the rights to a granola recipe using oats, which he claimed to have invented himself, to Sovex Natural Foods for $3,000. The company was founded in 1953 in Holly, Michigan by the Hurlinger family with the main purpose of producing a concentrated paste of brewer's yeast and soy sauce known as "Sovex". Earlier in 1964, it had been bought by John Goodbrad and moved to Collegedale, Tennessee. In 1967, Gentry bought back the rights for west of the Rockies for $1,500 and then sold the west coast rights to Wayne Schlotthauer of Lassen Foods in Chico, California, for $18,000. Lassen was founded from a health food bakery run by Schlotthauer's father-in-law.

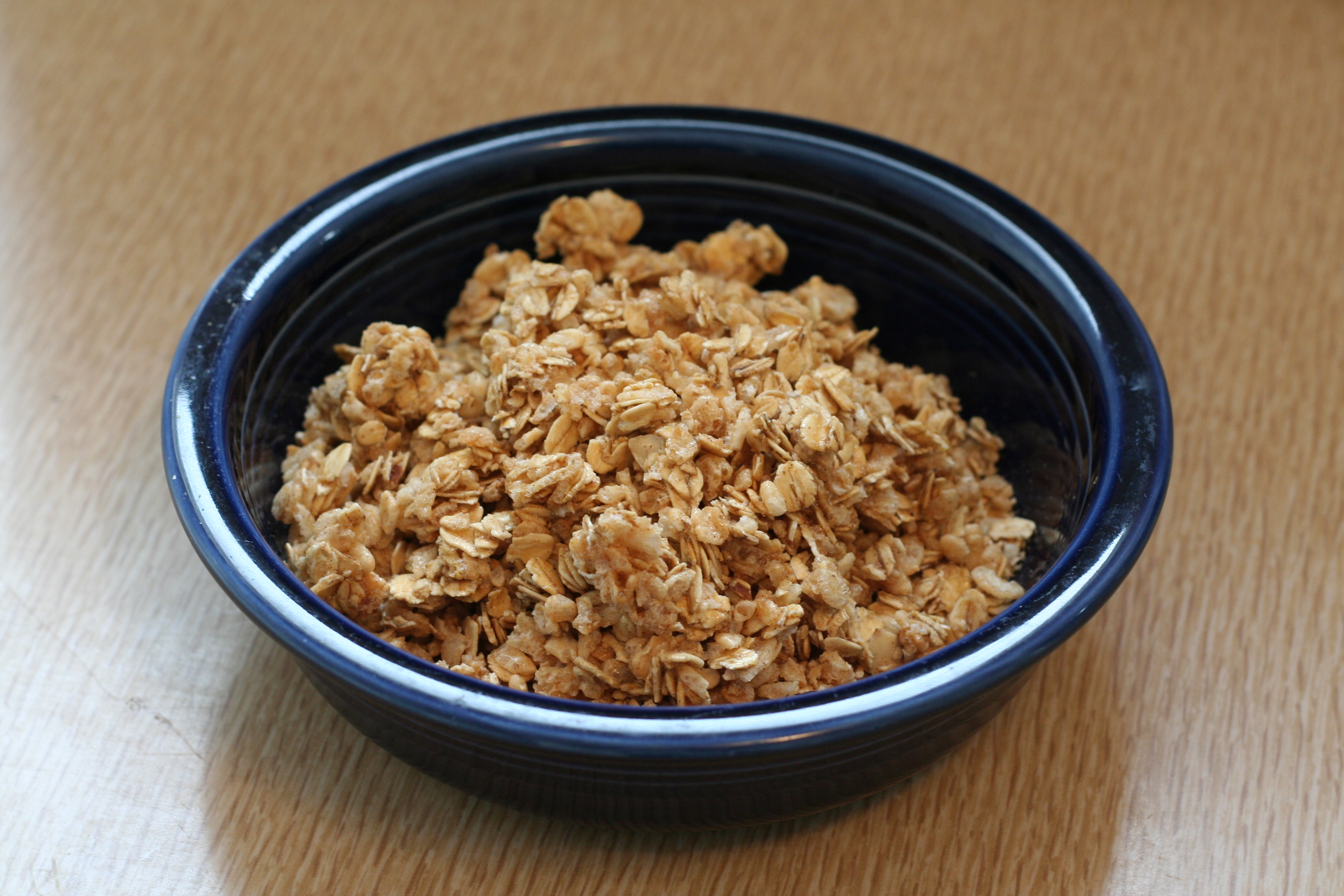
A bowl of dry, plain granola

In 1969, during Woodstock, Lisa Law asked the festival organizers for $3,000 to buy, in New York City, rolled oats, bulgar wheat, wheat germ, dried apricots, currants, almonds, soy sauce, and honey to make muesli. Volunteers fed circa 130,000 people with Dixie cups.

In 1972, an executive at Pet Milk, St. Louis, Missouri, introduced Heartland Natural Cereal, the first major commercial granola. At almost the same time, the Quaker Oats Company introduced Quaker 100% Natural Granola. Quaker was threatened with legal action by Gentry, and they subsequently changed the name of their product to Harvest Crunch. Within a year, Kellogg's had introduced its "Country Morning" granola cereal and General Mills had introduced its "Nature Valley". In 1974, McKee Baking (later McKee Foods), makers of Little Debbie snack cakes, purchased Sovex. In 1998, the company also acquired the Heartland brand and moved its manufacturing to Collegedale. In 2004, Sovex's name was changed to "Blue Planet Foods".

== Granola bar ==
Granola bars (or muesli bars) became popular in the 1960s as a snack bar, similar to the traditional flapjack familiar in the British Isles and Newfoundland. Granola bars consist of granola mixed with honey or other sweetened syrup, pressed and baked into a bar shape, resulting in the production of a more convenient snack. The product is most popular in the United States, Canada, Australia, New Zealand, the United Kingdom, parts of southern Europe, Brazil, Israel, South Africa, and Japan.

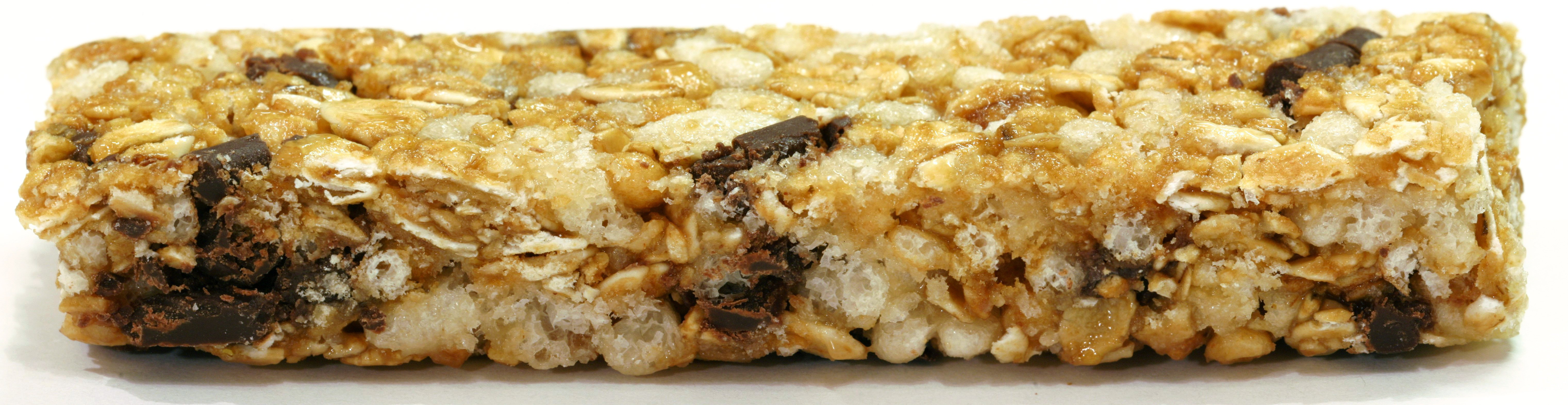
Closeup of a granola bar showing the detail of its pressed shape

== Matzo granola ==
Matzo granola is a breakfast food eaten by some Jewish people during the holiday of Passover. It consists of broken up matzo pieces in place of oats. Many variations are possible by adding other ingredients.

== Trademark ==
The names Granula and Granola were registered trademarks in the late 19th century United States for foods consisting of sweetened whole grain products crumbled and then baked until crisp. The name is now a trademark only in Australia and New Zealand. However, the use of the term granola in Australia was clarified in 2012 when Sanitarium Health foods alleged trademark infringement by the word's usage on the product labels of Irrewarra sourdough. The Federal Court of Australia concluded that use of the word granola had become commonplace and could not infringe Sanitarium's right to the term when used to describe the product itself, rather than as a trademark.
