= Walter E. Gregory =

American physician

Medical career
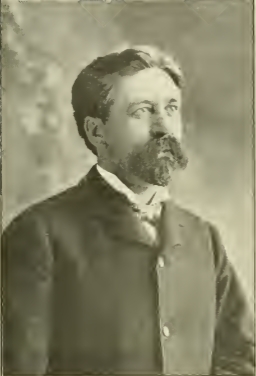
- Born: September 18, 1857; Reedsville, Wisconsin, U.S.
- Died: October 26, 1918; Dansville, Livingston County, New York, U.S.
- Education: University at Buffalo
- Occupation: physician
- Spouse: Helen C. Davis (m. 1889)
- Medical career
- Field: nervous diseases
- Institutions: Jackson Health Resort
- Sub-specialties: neurasthenia

Walter E. Gregory (September 18, 1857 – October 26, 1918) was an American physician who specialized in nervous diseases, specifically neurasthenia. He became superintendent of the Jackson Health Resort of Dansville, Livingston County, New York in 1872, and after graduating from medical school, one of the managing physicians of the institution. He was the first chairman of the Southern Livingston County, New York chapter of the American Red Cross, the chapter being founded in the town where Clara Barton first started the Red Cross movement in the U.S.

== Biography ==
Walter Eugene Gregory was born in Reedsville, Wisconsin, September 18, 1857.

Gregory's father, was a native of Ashtabula, Ohio, in which town Ezra Gregory, his grandfather, was also born. At the age of 35, Ezra moved to Wisconsin, where he lived until his death. He reared a family of seven children. Two of Gregory's father's brothers and one of his mother's, were well known and successful physicians in the western U.S.

In his childhood, Gregory attended the graded schools in Missouri, and on returning to Wisconsin, at the age of 16, continued his studies in the district school where he prepared for the high school course. He graduated from the Wisconsin High School at the age of 21.

In 1882, failing in health, he came to the Jackson Sanatorium where 25 years before, his uncle, Levi Cottington, had been restored to health. Placing himself under the care of Dr. James Hathaway Jackson, Gregory followed the directions given to him and in six months, was able to engage in light employment. He continued making himself useful in various ways until the fire of 1882, when he became superintendent in the institution's business office.

In 1886, he entered the medical department of the University at Buffalo, graduating in 1889, doctor of medicine, on the honor roll. He then became a member of the physician staff at the Jackson Sanatorium. An expert in cases of neurasthenia, he treated patients from different states in the U.S. All his medical life had been lived on the Dansville hillside and when the Jackson Health Resort was leased to the government in February 1918, many of his patients stayed on in town, so as to continue under his care.

Gregory was a member of the New York State Medical Association, and was the chair of the Southern Livingston County, New York chapter of the American Red Cross. The chapter was founded in the town where Clara Barton first started the Red Cross movement in the U.S. He was the leader of the organization from its inception and incorporation until his death. Under his leadership, during various war drives, the chapter always terminated with 'over the top' quotas. His financial generosity to the organization lent impetus to various projects.

In April 1889, Gregory married Helen C. Davis, of St. Andrews, Quebec, and the same year, they both became stockholders and directors in what was then known as Our Home Hygienic Institute and thereafter became active coadjutors of Dr. Jackson at the Jackson Sanatorium. The Gregory's home was at Cherry Knoll, situated a little to the south and east of the sanatorium. They had a daughter, Beatrice H.

Walter Eugene Gregory died at his home in Dansville, October 26, 1918, from pneumonia. Buried in Greenmount Cemetery, Dansville, New York, beside his wife, he was the first local physician to die fighting the 1918 influenza epidemic.
