= Reedville =

Reedville may refer to:

- Reedville, Oregon, United States
- Reedville, Texas, United States
- Reedville, Virginia, United States

== See also ==
- Readville
- Reedsville (disambiguation)
- Reidville (disambiguation)
