= Katharine Johnson Jackson =

American physician; stenographer (1841–1921)

Dr. Kate J. Jackson
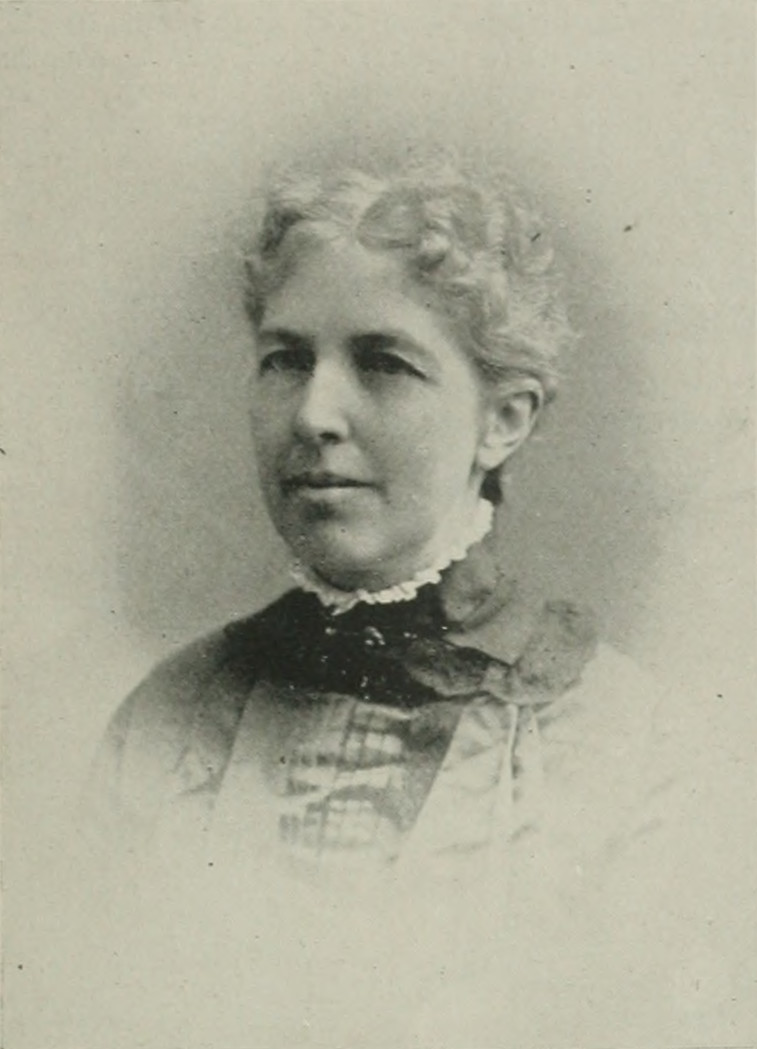
- "A Woman of the Century"
- Born: Katharine Johnson; April 7, 1841; Sturbridge, Massachusetts
- Died: February 24, 1921 (aged 79); Livonia, New York
- Education: Woman's Medical College of the New York Infirmary
- Occupations: stenographer; physicians
- Spouse: James Hathaway Jackson (m. 1864)
- Relatives: James Caleb Jackson (father-in-law)
- Medical career
- Field: water cure
- Institutions: Jackson Sanatorium

Katharine Johnson Jackson (better known as Kate J. Jackson; April 7, 1841 – February 24, 1921) was an American physician affiliated with the water cure movement at the Jackson Sanatorium in Dansville, Livingston County, New York. Earlier in her life, she studied stenography, and became one of the first women to adopt that profession.

== Early life and education ==
Katharine (or Katherine) (nickname, "Kate) Johnson was born in an isolated farmhouse among the hills of Sturbridge, Massachusetts, April 7, 1841. Her father, the Hon. Emerson Johnson, had been a member of both the Massachusetts House of Representatives and Massachusetts Senate. Her mother was Hannah (Arnold) Johnson. Her grandfather was James Johnson.

Attendance in the district school alternated with home study until the age of sixteen, when she spent a year at Home School in Hopedale, Massachusetts, where she subsequently became a teacher. Afterwards, under a private tutor, she prepared for the course at Hartford High School in Hartford, Connecticut, where she was subsequently engaged as a teacher. From both parents she inherited refined and cultivated tastes and a fondness for books, which has made her a good student.

Jackson enjoyed active physical exercise, especially housework, in which she became proficient as a young girl. She was also fond of outdoor sports and walking, and could master a Latin or history lesson best after a long walk over the hills or vigorous indoor work. Ambitious to be self-supporting, she took up the study of stenography at home, at first as a past-time. She was probably among the first women to adopt that profession.

== Career ==
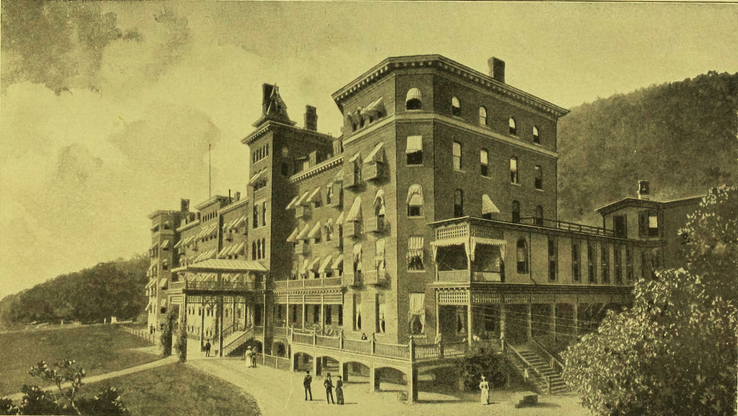
Jackson Sanatorium

Her acquaintance with the Jackson Sanatorium, in Dansville, New York, began in the year 1861, when she became private secretary to Dr. James Caleb Jackson, who was at that time conducting his institution under the name of "Our Home on the Hillside." It was during the 2.5 years which she spent there that the acquaintance with Dr. Jackson's son, James Hathaway Jackson, ripened into a mutual affection, which resulted in their marriage on September 13, 1864. After the lapse of a few years, during which time their only child, James Arthur Jackson, was born, she and her husband went to New York for a medical course, he in Bellevue and she in the Woman's Medical College of the New York Infirmary. She was graduated in 1877 as the valedictorian of her class, and at once assumed professional duties and responsibilities in the Jackson institution. becoming one of the managing physicians at the Jackson Health Resort. for some years, she had charge of the gynecological department of the institution. In 1881, she took a private course in gynecology under Dr. H. T. Hanks of New York City. Still later, she devoted herself to general medicine and sanitary work in the sanatorium.

Jackson's work at the Jackson Sanatorium gave her little opportunity for public expression of her sentiments, except through her writings. Her more important literary work included articles on hygiene and hydrotherapy, in connection with assistant editorship of the Laws of Life, a family health journal. She was the author of numerous articles on health and kindred topics. A persuasive speaker, her talks upon health and associated topics were among the most practical and valuable instructions given to the patients in the Jackson Sanatorium.

She was a member of the Livingston County Medical Society; Woman's Christian Temperance Union; King's Daughters; Red Cross Association; and formerly of Sorosis.

Jackson died at her home in Livonia, New York on February 24, 1921.

== Selected works ==
- About babies, 1878
- Tea and Coffee: Are they Injurious?, 1896
