= Jackson Sanatorium =

Mineral spa in New York, United States

Coordinates: 42.5684°N 77.6896°W

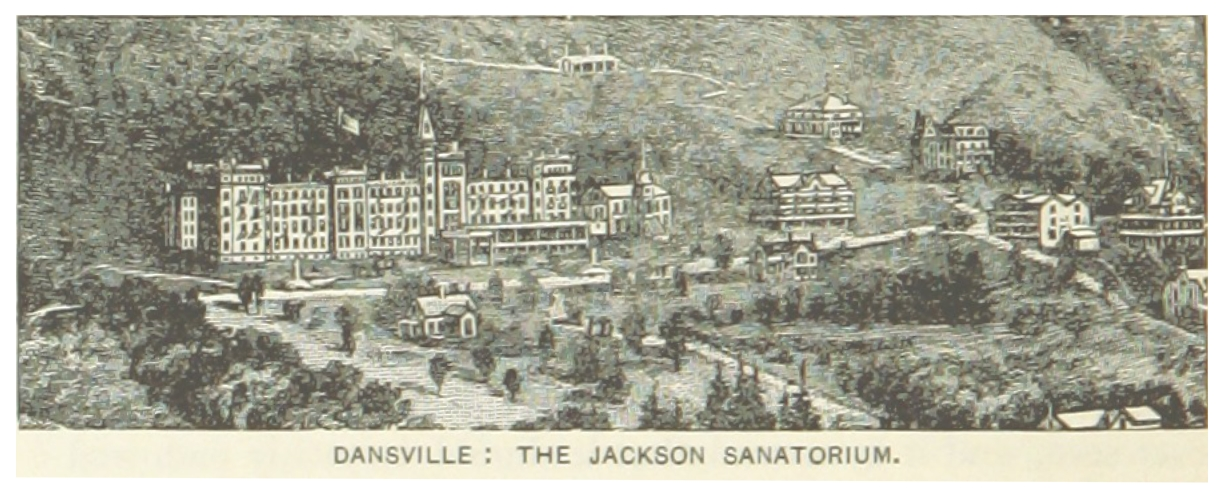
Jackson Sanatorium (1891)

Jackson Sanatorium (also known as, Our Home on the Hillside, Home Hygienic Institute, Jackson Health Resort) was a historical mineral spa in Dansville, Livingston County, New York, attracted many prominent people to Dansville for the water cure. Operated for many years by the Jackson family, its operations dated to 1852 when water cures were in growing favor. Dansville had a spring gushing from the hillside, "All Healing Spring", which was supposed to have curative properties. As these water cures were located near some noted springs, "the Home on the Hillside" was created and the institution was ready for occupancy in 1853. In 1890, the old name of the company, "Our Home Hygienic Institute" was changed to "The Jackson Sanitorium". In 1904, the name was again changed to "The Jackson Health Resort". Granula was invented at the Jackson Sanatorium.

== Early history ==
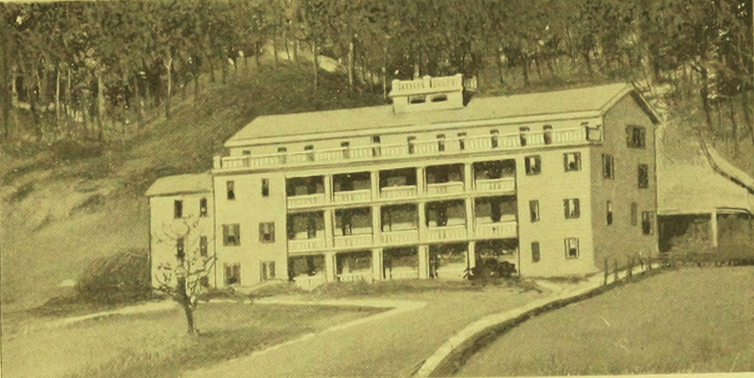
Original building

The history of the Institution dates from the year 1854, when Nathaniel Bingham, who was more or less of an invalid and who became interested in the growing water cure therapy, introduced from Germany, thought it would be a good idea to have a water cure option at Dansville. These Institutions were starting up all through the U.S. and were attracting a great deal of attention. The spring on the east hillside, then known as the "All-Healing Spring", which burst out one night in the 1800s, carrying away rocks and trees and earth, was thought to possess curative qualities of value.

Bingham associated with himself Lyman Granger, and the Institution was completed in its first form and ready for occupancy in 1853. In the meantime, Bingham's health continued to fail; Granger thought he would withdraw also from the enterprise so they both sold their interests to Abraham Pennell, at that time a resident of Richmond, Ontario County, New York, who had a son-in-law (Dr. Stevens) who was anxious to establish in the Water Cure practice.

Stevens opened the Institution but carried it on for only a short time. The building was closed then for a year when a Dr. Blackall, a physician of New York City, assumed charge and carried the Water Cure on for some time. Not achieving the success he had desired, he forsook the enterprise and nothing more was done until the year 1858 when Dr. James Caleb Jackson, who had been physician in a similar Institution in Glen Haven, Cayuga County, New York, came to look over the property. He had been induced to do so by Pennell in the hope that he might, by reason of his extensive acquaintance with Water Cure people, find someone to purchase the same, was so attracted by the character of the spring and the possibilities for the future, that he entered into an arrangement to lease the property for three years, with the privilege of buying at a stipulated sum within that period.

== Jackson family era ==
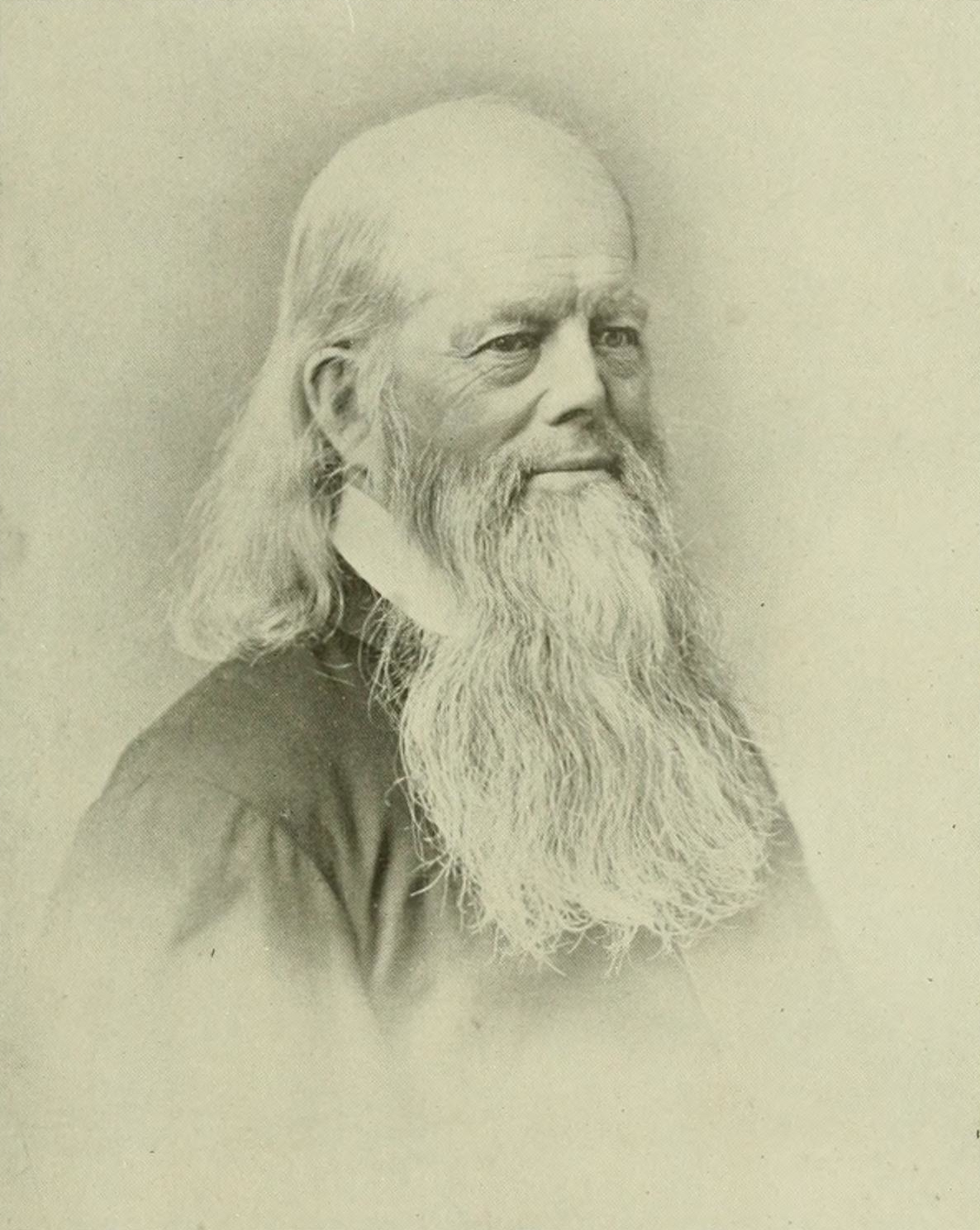
Dr. James Caleb Jackson

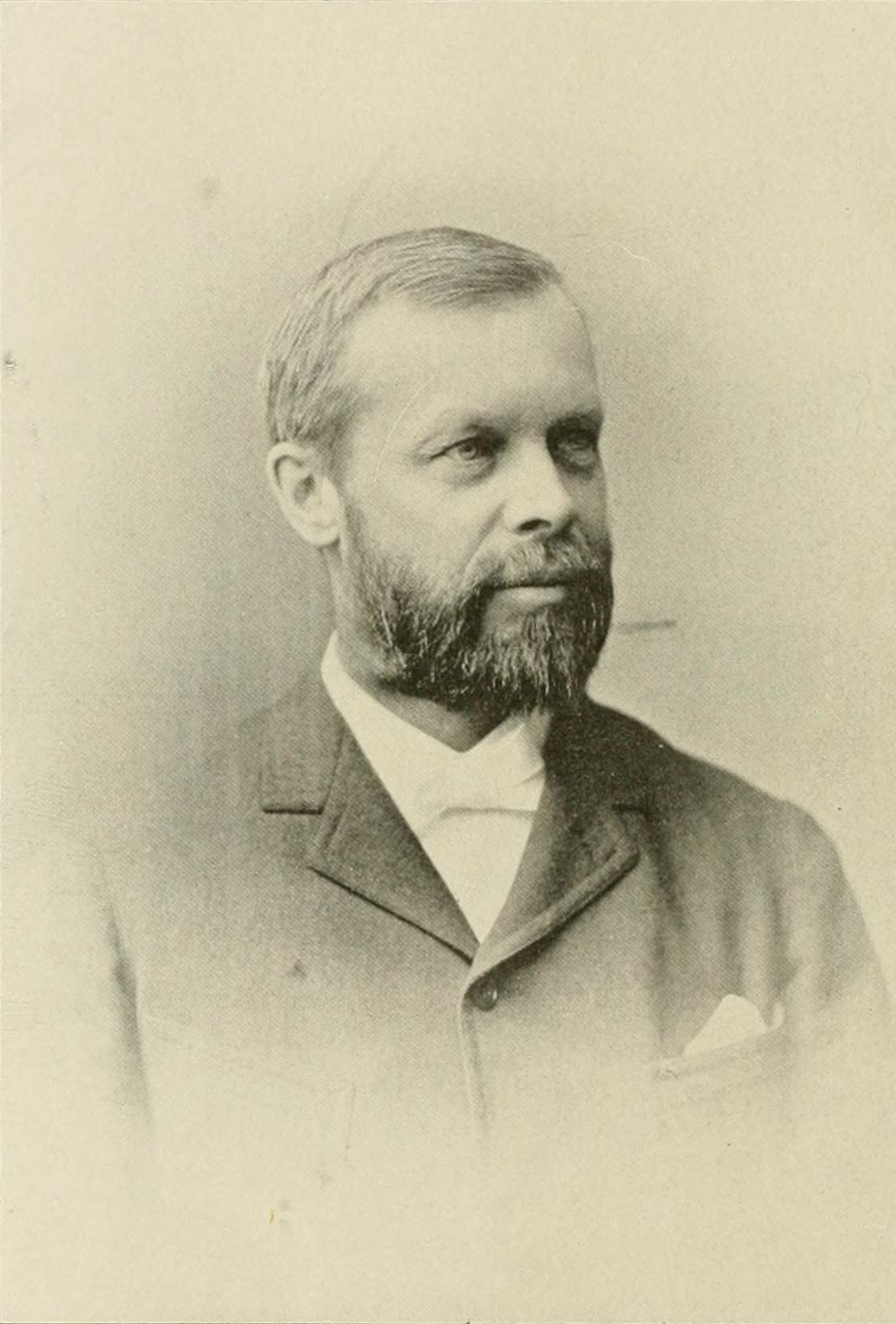
Dr. James Hathaway Jackson

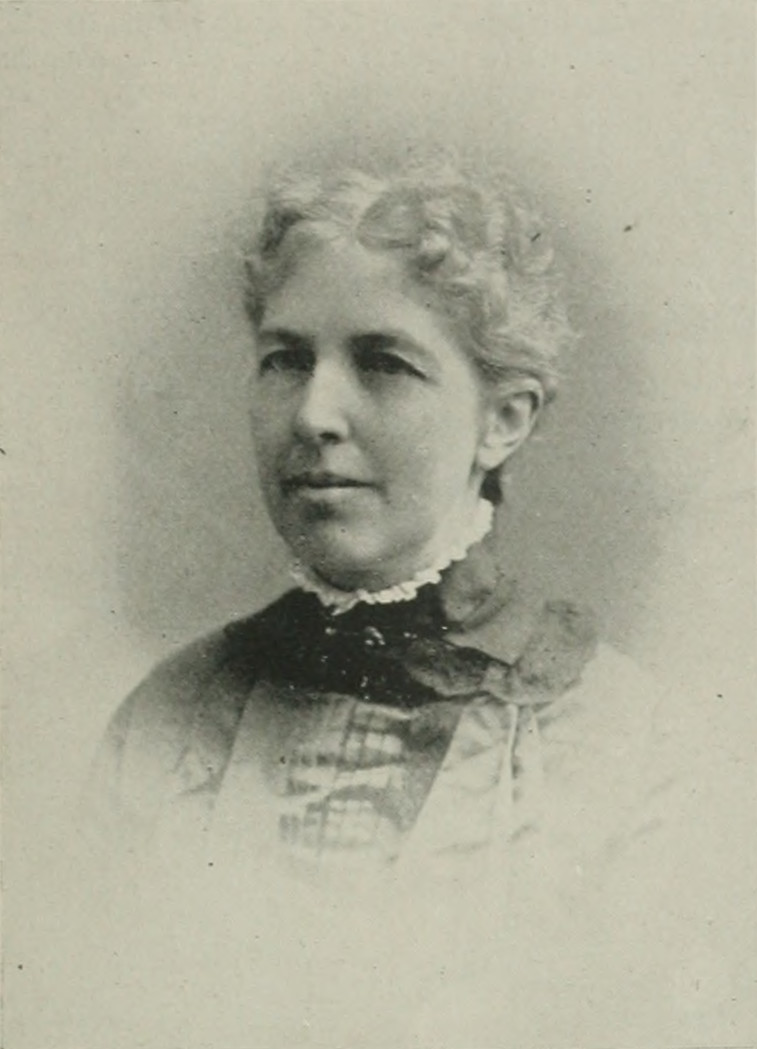
Dr. Katharine Johnson Jackson

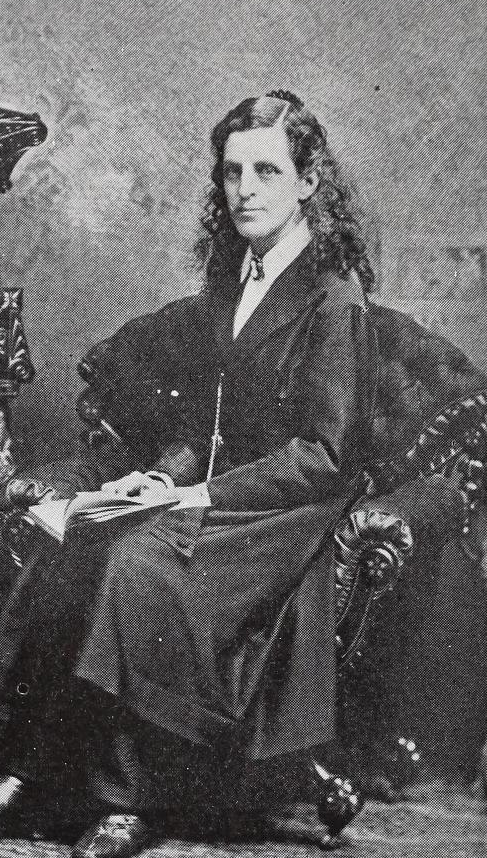
Dr. Harriet N. Austin

On October 1, 1858, Jackson and his group of assistants arrived in Dansville and were landed by Captain Henry, who then was the proprietor of the stage line between Wayland, New York and Dansville. Jackson was not a man of capital, but a man of ideas and great force of character. He had a large clientage by reason of his success as a Water Cure physician during the time he had practiced at Glen Haven. His eldest son, Giles E. Jackson, his adopted daughter, Dr. Harriet Newell Austin, and a good friend, F. Wilson Hurd, who afterwards became a physician, were the original proprietors.

The capital with which the Institution was started was US$750, the partners being equally interested. The first business organization, established in October 1858, was known as "F. Wilson Hurd & Co." with Giles E. Jackson as the business manager. Other Jackson family members who were also involved included Dr. Jackson's wife, Lucretia Edgerton (Brewster) Jackson ("Mother Jackson") and Dr. Jackson's youngest son, James H. Jackson.

The Institution grew and thrived greatly, so that by the time the winter of 1858 set in Dr. Jackson had 50 patients under his care. Every year saw large improvement made to the Institution. Liberty Hall was built in 1864, being planned and its construction supervised by Giles E. Jackson. It was built by Alonzo Phillips, of Dansville, as the contractor. The original plot of land on which the building was erected or connected with the same, was bought of Peter Perine and consisted of 13 acres (5.3 ha). Nearly all the land which was connected with the Institution was bought from time to time of Perine.

=== 1864 death of Giles E. Jackson ===
The death of Giles E. Jackson of consumption in 1864, compelled a dissolution of the partnership, and his mother, Lucretia E. Jackson, and his younger brother, James H. Jackson, inherited his share. A new co-partnership was made under the firm name of Austin, Hurd & Co., Dr. Austin owning one-third, Dr. Hurd one-third, and Lucretia E. and James H. Jackson, owning one-sixth each. James H. Jackson became the business manager. James H. Jackson married Katharine Johnson in 1864, and two years later, Katharine's father, Hon. Emerson Johnson, came to live at Jackson Sanatorium and was an important factor in the business affairs of the Institution from that time until his death in 1896.

Dr. Hurd sold his interest in 1868 to the other partners and the new partnership was entitled Austin, Jackson & Co. Under this title, the business was carried on until 1872, when a stock company was organized with a capital of US$100,000, of which only 800 shares were issued. In the meantime, 10 or 12 cottages were built around the Institution and it grew to proportions enabling it to accommodate 300 people. It had a national reputation by this time, with guests from every state and territory of the U.S. at that time, and others from Canada and the West Indies.

James H. Jackson graduated as a physician in 1876 but continued always to be the Institution's business manager. His wife, Kate Johnson Jackson, graduated as a physician in 1877.

=== 1882 fire ===
On the evening of June 26, 1882, the main building burned. The cottages and Liberty Hall were unharmed. At the time, Dr. James Caleb Jackson, being 71 years of age, had practically retired from personal management of the Institution with Dr. James H. Jackson and Dr. Kate Johnson Jackson as the practical heads of the Institution.

=== 1883 new construction ===
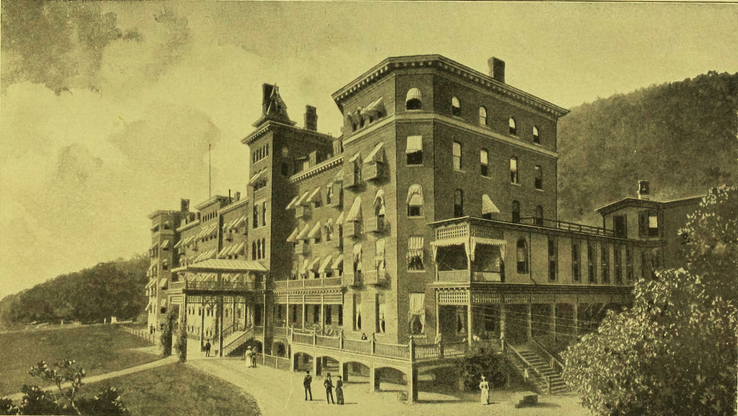
The main building

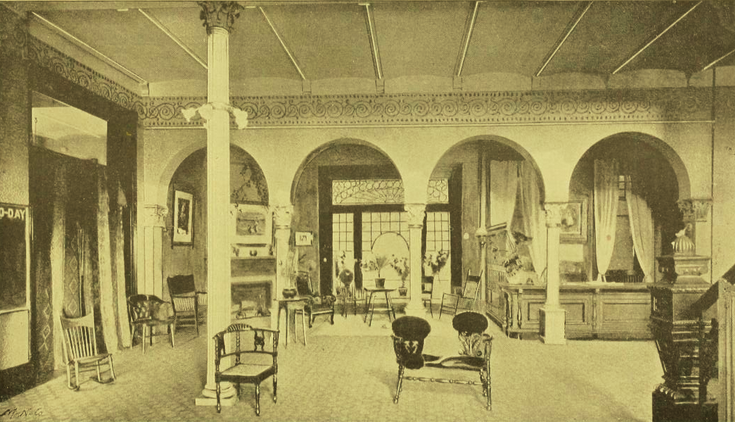
Entrance and lobby

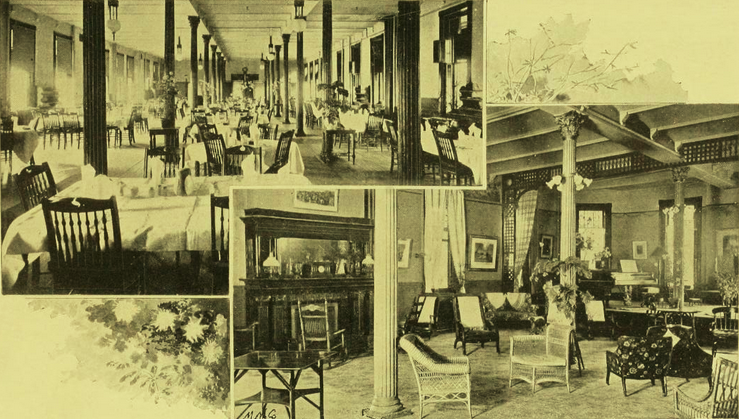
Parlor and main drawing room

After the fire, however, a new business combination was created. Dr. James H. Jackson bought in the outside stock until he became the owner of the whole 800 shares. He then disposed of 30 shares of the same to his three cousins. Dr. E. D. Leffingwell, Dr. Albert Leffingwell and William E. Leffingwell, these gentlemen being sons of Dr. James Caleb Jack.son's only sister, Jane E. Lefifingwell. They were all well educated and talented men and it was thought that this combination would prove a very strong one, as indeed it did. These gentlemen furnished US$20,000 worth of added capital, making the sum total of the issued shares US$100,000. US$100,000 of cash was borrowed on first mortgage and Dr. James H. Jackson, putting all the property left after the Fire and the insurance money and much of his private means into the enterprise, made it possible to build the fire-proof main building, completed October 1, 1883.

The new building was built by Frederich & Son of Rochester, New York, contractors. The architects were Messrs. Warner & Brockett, who designed the Powers Block and Powers Hotel in Rochester. The foundations were laid to grade by the Sanatorium organization. The name of the Institution was changed from "Our Home on the Hillside" to "The Sanatorium", Dr. James H. Jackson being the first one in the U.S. to use the word "Sanatorium" as applied to a health institution. This building was the first fire-proof structure ever built in the U.S., outside of a city, for purposes of a health institution. The main building, when the steam heating and plumbing were completed, had cost US$180,000, so that with its furnishings, it was a heavy financial investment with debt upon it of US$200,000. This amount, with the insurance money and the capital put in it by the Leffingwells, represented the practical cost of the Institution when it was ready to do business in October 1883.

The thermo-electric bath was perhaps the most popular hydro-therapeutic measure enjoyed by the sanatorium's patients and guests. The women's electric department came equipped with a stationary Fitch battery, portable Kidder Faradic, and Baltimore dry-cell galvanic batteries, with Williams current controlled, and fitted for every form of electrical treatment or bath. The men's department included a combination cabinet machine made by the Kidder Company of New York, and portable batterires. A Waite & Bartlett machine was added to the Static electricity room, which, with a Ramsey charger attached, was to fortify it against atmospheric influence. The gynecological department used a large McIntosh battery.

In the new company combination, Dr. William E. Leffingwell was business manager, while Dr. James H. Jackson, Dr. Kate J. Jackson, Dr. Elisha D. Leffingwell and Dr. Albert Leffingwell were managing physicians.

In 1886, William E. Leffingwell sold his interest to his brothers; in 1887 Dr. E. D. Leffingwell sold his interest to Dr. Albert Leffingwell; and in 1888, Dr. Albert Leffingwell sold his interest to Dr. James H. Jackson who associated with himself as trustees and managers, Dr. Walter E. Gregory, and Mrs. Helen D. Gregory, his wife. Dr. Gregory had been for years a superintendent in the Institution and had graduated in medicine. Mrs. Gregory had been cashier of the Institution from 1882, and Dr. James H. Jackson associated them in the enterprise when the Leffingwells sold their interest.

=== 1890 sale of Our Home Hygienic Institute ===
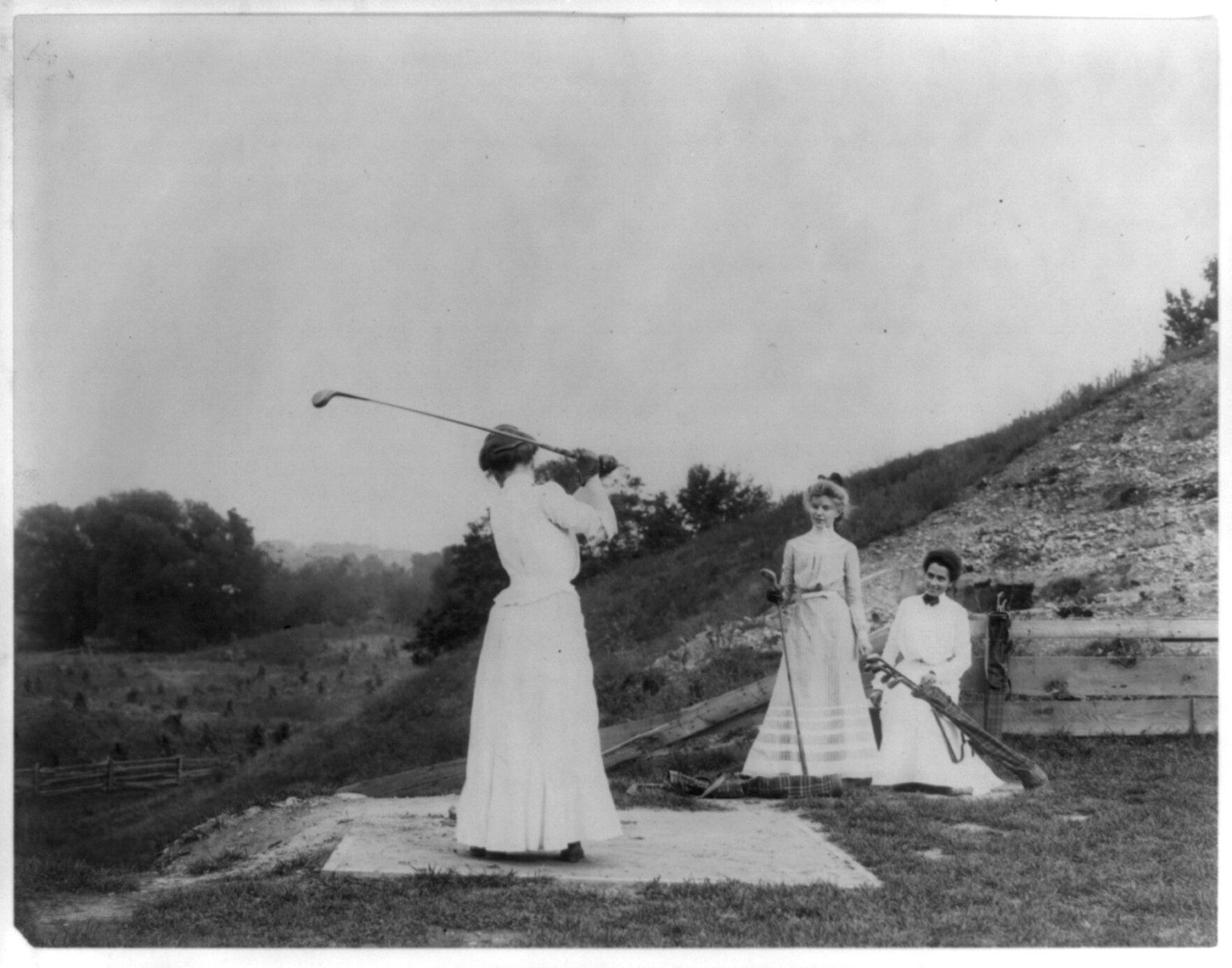
Women playing golf at Jackson Sanitorium, 1890

In the year 1890, the old stock company, known as Our Home Hygienic Institute of Dansville, New York, was sold to a new corporation known as The Jackson Sanatorium, and Dr. James Arthur Jackson (b. 1868), son of Dr. James H. Jackson and Dr. Kate J. Jackson, became an owner. Mrs. Gregory retired from ownership, but retained her office as cashier and treasurer.

James Arthur Jackson graduated in medicine in 1895 and became a physician and business manager in association with his father and Dr. and Mrs. Gregory in that year, his father retiring practically from the details of the business management.

Dr. James Caleb Jackson died in 1895.

The Jacksons issued the initial Year Book in 1897, covering the sanatorium's history of the previous year. The resident family hoped through it to gain a personal relationship with many who had at some time within the previous forty years visited the institution. Hundreds among these were also subscribers to their health journal, The Laws of Life, which was discontinued some years later. In the Year Book, the Jacksons held that the way to health and highest being of body and mind was to be found by "living in obedience to the divine laws of life". This included diet, exercise, rest, baths, electricity and other therapeutic forms of treatment recognized and employed by the medical profession at that time, but also mental and spiritual forces for regaining and preserving health. They believed in the healthful influence of "right mental habits", in the "potency of good thinking", and that the power of faith, hope and love as being the most natural, practical and efficient way for therapeutic purposes.

== 20th century ==
About 1916, the institution passed into the hands of a receiver and was later sold to Dr. Leffingwell, who operated it for some time. On January 1, 1918, during World War I, the Institution was leased by the government and designated as U.S. Army General Hospital No. 13. The hospital specialized in the treatment of psychoneuroses, and it began receiving patients in November 1918.

The U.S. Public Health Service took over the hospital in April 1919. War veterans suffering from nervous disorders were treated here for the next year and a half, fully 150 being accommodated at one time.

The hospital was closed at the expiration of this period and for three years the property remained vacant. In 1924, announcement was made that the place had been bought by W. F. Goodale, of Buffalo, New York and a group of physicians of that city. Extensive improvements were made at the institution and it was opened to the public as a hotel and health resort in the latter part of 1924.

== See also ==
- Battle Creek Sanitarium
