= Reidsville =

Reidsville is the name of two towns in the United States:

- Reidsville, Georgia
- Reidsville, North Carolina

== See also ==
- Reedsville (disambiguation)
- Reidville (disambiguation)
