= Dansville Municipal Airport =

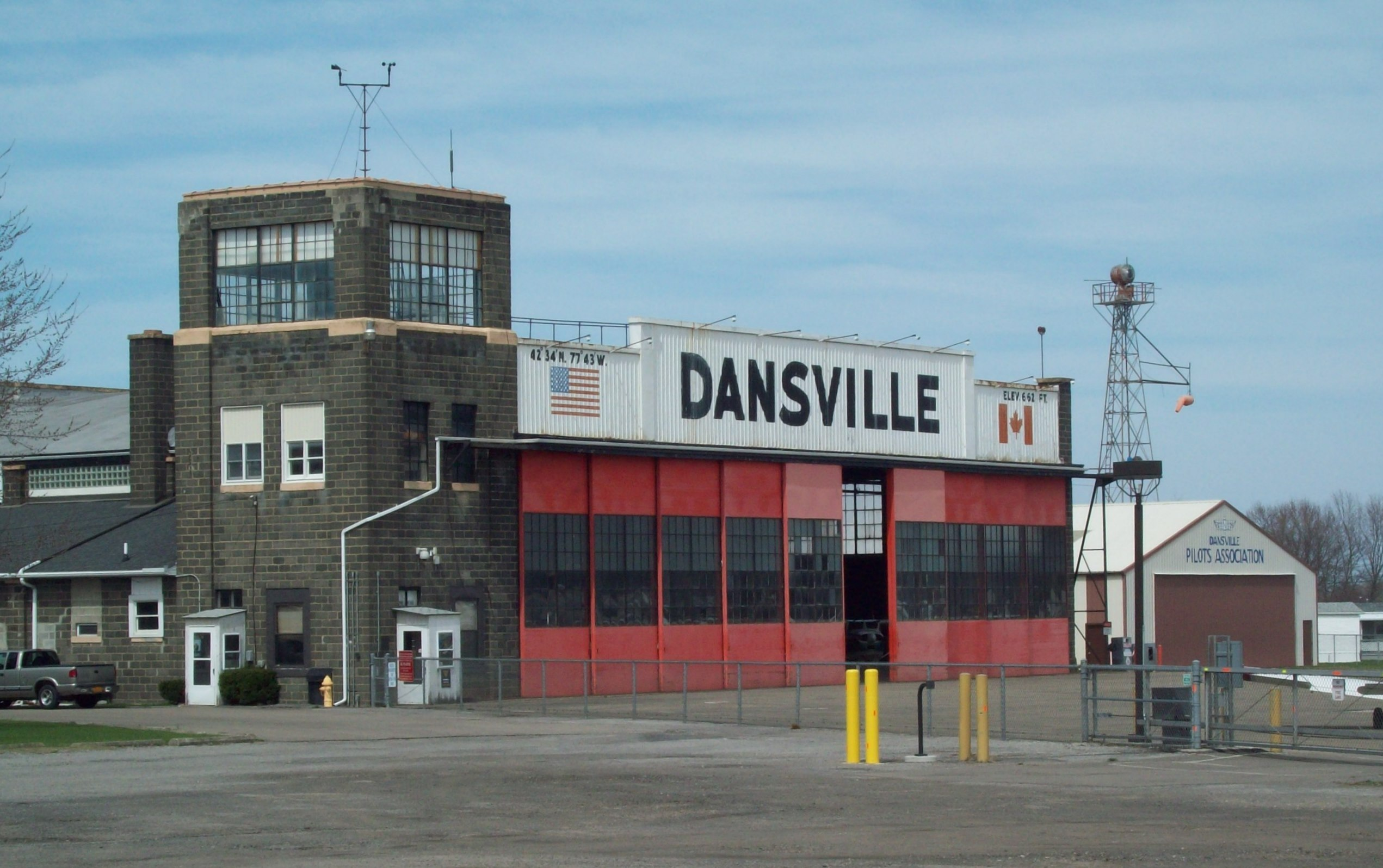
- IATA: DSV; ICAO: KDSV; FAA LID: DSV

Summary
- Airport type: Public
- Owner: Town of North Dansville
- Serves: Dansville, Livingston County, New York
- Elevation AMSL: 662 ft (202 m)
- Coordinates: 42°34′15″N 077°42′47″W
- Interactive map of Dansville Municipal Airport

Runways
Direction	Length		Surface
Direction	ft	m	Surface
14/32	3,500	1,067	Asphalt
18/36	CLOSED	745	Asphalt

Statistics (2007)
- Aircraft operations: 48,050
- Based aircraft: 33
- Source: Federal Aviation Administration

Dansville Municipal Airport (IATA: DSV, ICAO: KDSV, FAA LID: DSV) is a public use airport located one nautical mile (2 km) northwest of the central business district of Dansville, a village in Livingston County, New York, United States. It is owned by the Town of North Dansville.

== Facilities and aircraft ==
Dansville Municipal Airport covers an area of 162 acres (66 ha) at an elevation of 662 feet (202 m) above mean sea level. It has two asphalt paved runways: 14/32 which measures 3,500 x 100 feet (1,067 x 30 m) and Closed X18/36X Closed which measures 2,443 x 100 feet (745 x 30 m).

For the 12-month period ending August 8, 2007, the airport had 48,050 aircraft operations, an average of 131 per day: 98% general aviation, 2% air taxi and 1% military. At that time there were 33 aircraft based at this airport: 61% single-engine, 9% multi-engine and 30% glider.

== Balloon Festival ==
Annually, around Labor Day weekend, the airport is the venue for the New York State Festival of Balloons. The first such event was held in 1981 and given the designation of New York's official festival in 1997, beating out similar festivals in Glens Falls and Poughkeepsie for the designation. As of 2007, it attracts about 35,000 visitors each year.

== See also ==
- List of airports in New York
