= Reedsville =

Reedsville is the name of some places in the United States of America:

- Reedsville, Ohio
- Reedsville, Pennsylvania
- Reedsville, West Virginia
- Reedsville, Wisconsin

== See also ==
- Reidsville (disambiguation)
