= James Hathaway Jackson =

American physician

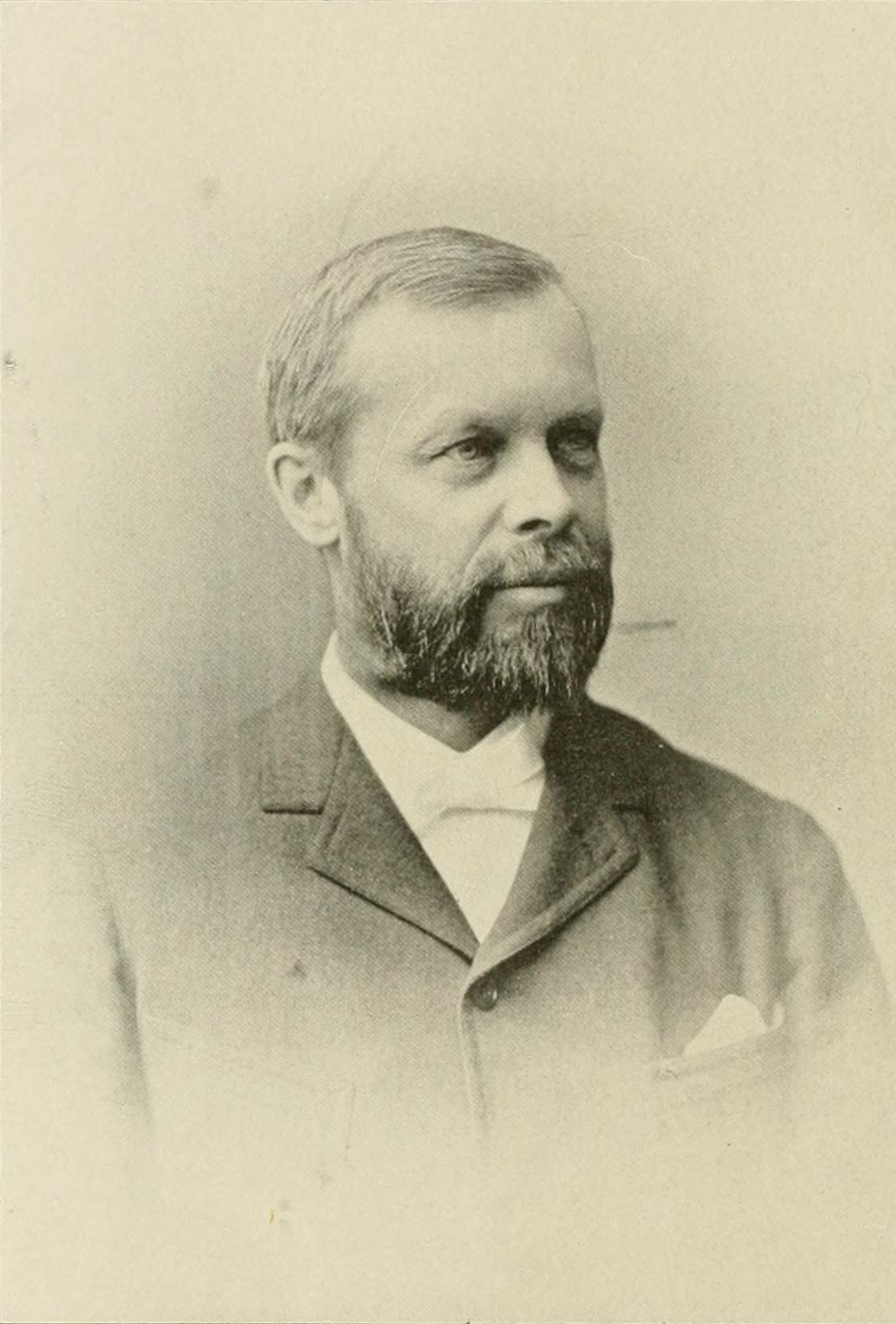
James Hathaway Jackson

signature

James Hathaway Jackson (June 11, 1841 – February 18, 1928) was an American physician. He was in charge of the Jackson Sanatorium at Dansville, Livingston County, New York and also served as that city's mayor.

== Early life and education ==
James Hathaway Jackson was born in Peterboro, Madison County, New York, on June 11, 1841. His parents were James Caleb Jackson and Lucretia Edgerton (Brewster) Jackson. Dr. Harriet Newell Austin was his sister after she was adopted by James Hathaway Jackson's parents.

He was educated at a seminary in Dansville, New York. Jackson graduated at the age of 35 from Bellevue Hospital medical College, New York City.

== Career ==
He was the manager of the Jackson Health Resort (1861-1895). In 1876, he assumed charge of the Jackson Sanatorium at Dansville, so successfully carried on by his father for nearly 20 years. He was a member of the Livingston Company Medical Society, the New York State Medical Society, and the American Medical Association. Jackson was also the editor of the institution's Laws of Life and Journal of Health.

Jackson was a Republican. On February 12, 1895, he was elected as mayor of Dansville, being the first Republican to hold that office. He also served as a member of Dansville's Board of Education.

In religion, he was a member of the Christian Union. He was a Mason, and Worshipful Master of Phoenix Lodge, No. 115, A. F. & A. M. Jackson was also a member of Sons of the American Revolution Society, Mayflower Descendants Society, and the General Society of Colonial Wars.

== Personal life ==
On September 13, 1864, he married Dr. Katharine Johnson Jackson, of Sturbridge, Massachusetts. They had one son, James Arthur Jackson, who served as Secretary and Manager of the Jackson Sanatarium.

James Hathaway Jackson died February 18, 1928, at his home in Atascadero, California.
