= Reidville =

Reidville may refer to:

- Reidville, Newfoundland and Labrador, Canada
- Reidville, South Carolina, United States

== See also ==
- Readville
- Reedville (disambiguation)
- Reidsville (disambiguation)
