= Thomas A. Sullivan =

American politician

Thomas A. Sullivan (July 31, 1855 – March 27, 1946) was an American farmer and politician.

Born in Hartford, Connecticut, Sullivan moved with his parents to Manitowoc County, Wisconsin and settled on a farm in Reedsville, Wisconsin. Sullivan was a farmer and livestock dealer. He also worked as a foreman for the Manitowoc County Highway Department. Sullivan served on the Manitowoc County Board of Supervisors and on the school board. Sullivan also served as chairman of the Franklin Town Board and was a Republican. Sullivan served in the Wisconsin State Assembly in 1921 and 1929. Sullivan died in Manitowoc, Wisconsin.
