= Reedsville, Wisconsin =

- Village
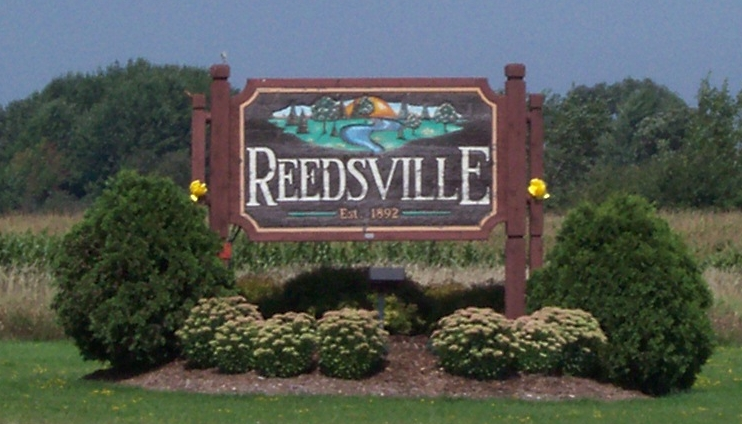

- Location of Reedsville in Manitowoc County, Wisconsin
- Coordinates: 44°9′14″N 87°57′20″W
- Country: United States
- State: Wisconsin
- County: Manitowoc

Area
  - Total: 1.22 sq mi (3.16 km^{2})
  - Land: 1.22 sq mi (3.15 km^{2})
  - Water: 0.0039 sq mi (0.01 km^{2})
- Elevation: 827 ft (252 m)

Population (2020)
  - Total: 1,195
  - Density: 944/sq mi (364.6/km^{2})
- Time zone: UTC-6 (Central (CST))
  - Summer (DST): UTC-5 (CDT)
- ZIP Code: 54230
- Area code: 920
- FIPS code: 55-66875
- GNIS feature ID: 1572174
- Website: reedsvillewi.gov

Reedsville is a village in Manitowoc County, Wisconsin, United States. The population was 1,195 at the 2020 census.

== History ==
The village was named after Judge George Reed, who, with his partner, Jacob Lueps, bought a section of land in the town of Maple Grove, Wisconsin. In 1854, they had the land platted and surveyed by George Wimpf, who laid out a village of 56 blocks. Early residents of the village were French Canadians and Menomonee Indians. Later, settlers from Germany, Bohemia, and Ireland came. The village was incorporated in 1892, when its population was 510.

== Geography ==
Reedsville is located at 44°9′14″N 87°57′20″W (44.153756, -87.955595).

According to the United States Census Bureau, the village has a total area of 1.25 square miles (3.24 km^{2}), all land.

== Demographics ==
Historical population
Census	Pop.	Note	%±
1880	140		—
1900	428		—
1910	550		28.5%
1920	571		3.8%
1930	617		8.1%
1940	729		18.2%
1950	691		−5.2%
1960	830		20.1%
1970	994		19.8%
1980	1,134		14.1%
1990	1,182		4.2%
2000	1,187		0.4%
2010	1,206		1.6%
2020	1,195		−0.9%
U.S. Decennial Census

=== 2010 census ===
As of the census of 2010, there were 1,206 people, 472 households, and 322 families living in the village. The population density was 964.8 inhabitants per square mile (372.5/km^{2}). There were 513 housing units at an average density of 410.4 per square mile (158.5/km^{2}). The racial makeup of the village was 90.5% White, 2.1% Native American, 6.5% from other races, and 1.0% from two or more races. Hispanic or Latino people of any race were 7.8% of the population.

There were 472 households, of which 32.4% had children under the age of 18 living with them, 57.0% were married couples living together, 6.4% had a female householder with no husband present, 4.9% had a male householder with no wife present, and 31.8% were non-families. 26.7% of all households were made up of individuals, and 11.3% had someone living alone who was 65 years of age or older. The average household size was 2.56 and the average family size was 3.13.

The median age in the village was 37.4 years. 27% of residents were under the age of 18; 6.7% were between the ages of 18 and 24; 27% were from 25 to 44; 25.5% were from 45 to 64; and 13.8% were 65 years of age or older. The gender makeup of the village was 50.7% male and 49.3% female.

=== 2000 census ===
As of the census of 2000, there were 1,187 people, 471 households, and 322 families living in the village. The population density was 1,253.4 people per square mile (482.4/km^{2}). There were 502 housing units at an average density of 530.1 per square mile (204.0/km^{2}). The racial makeup of the village was 98.06% White, 1.35% Native American, 0.34% from other races, and 0.25% from two or more races. Hispanic or Latino people of any race were 0.84% of the population.

There were 471 households, out of which 31.0% had children under the age of 18 living with them, 56.5% were married couples living together, 8.3% had a female householder with no husband present, and 31.6% were non-families. 28.0% of all households were made up of individuals, and 12.5% had someone living alone who was 65 years of age or older. The average household size was 2.50 and the average family size was 3.07.

In the village, the population was spread out, with 24.2% under the age of 18, 9.6% from 18 to 24, 27.8% from 25 to 44, 22.4% from 45 to 64, and 16.0% who were 65 years of age or older. The median age was 37 years. For every 100 females, there were 102.6 males. For every 100 females age 18 and over, there were 95.7 males.

The median income for a household in the village was $41,300, and the median income for a family was $48,864. Males had a median income of $33,304 versus $24,135 for females. The per capita income for the village was $19,762. About 2.1% of families and 3.1% of the population were below the poverty line, including 2.1% of those under age 18 and 8.6% of those age 65 or over.

== Notable people ==
- Daniel Fischer, Wisconsin politician
- Walter E. Gregory (1857–1918), physician
- Fred C. Maertz, Wisconsin politician
- Thomas A. Sullivan, Wisconsin politician

== Images ==
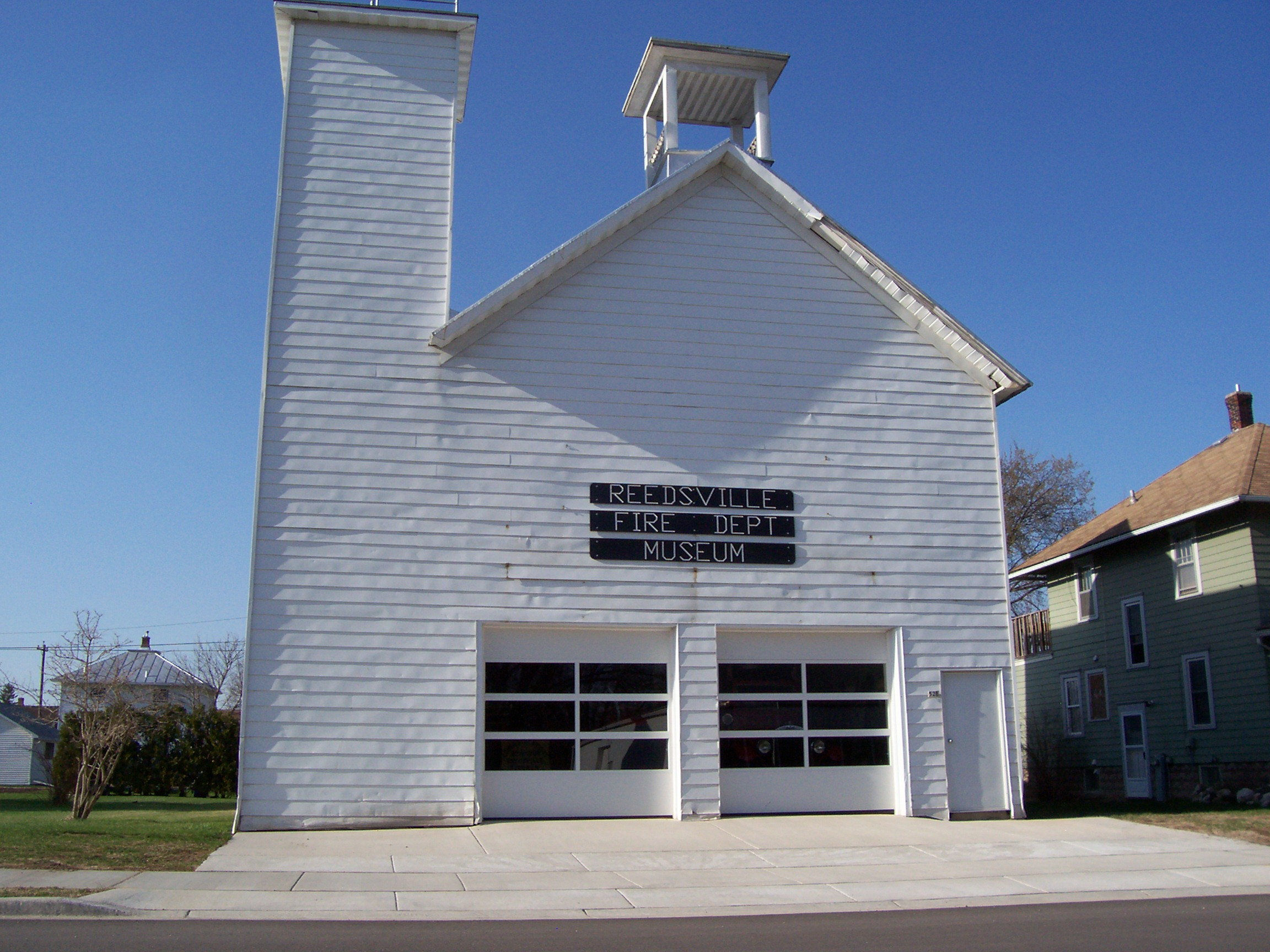
Reedsville Fire Station Museum

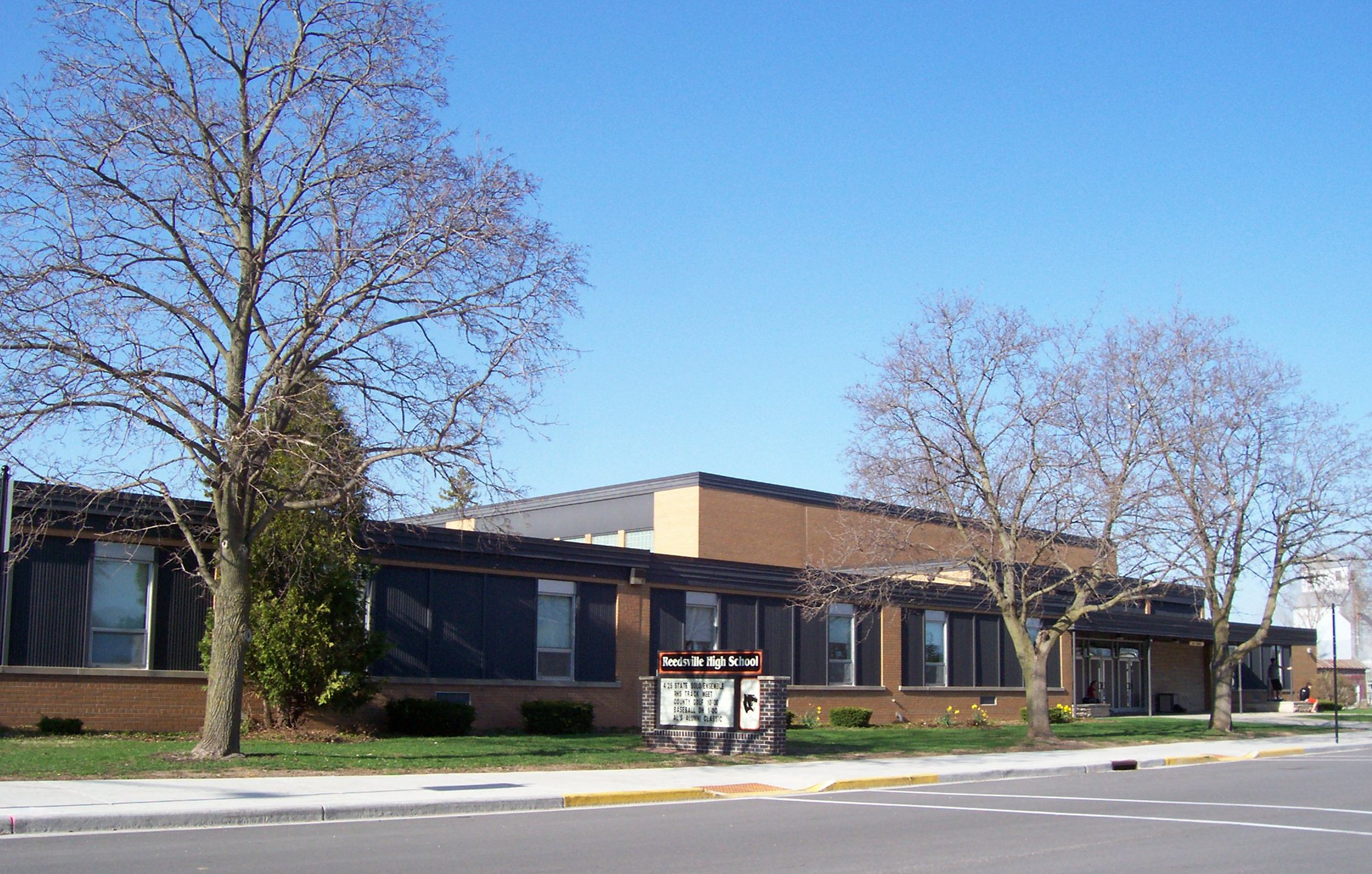
Reedsville High School

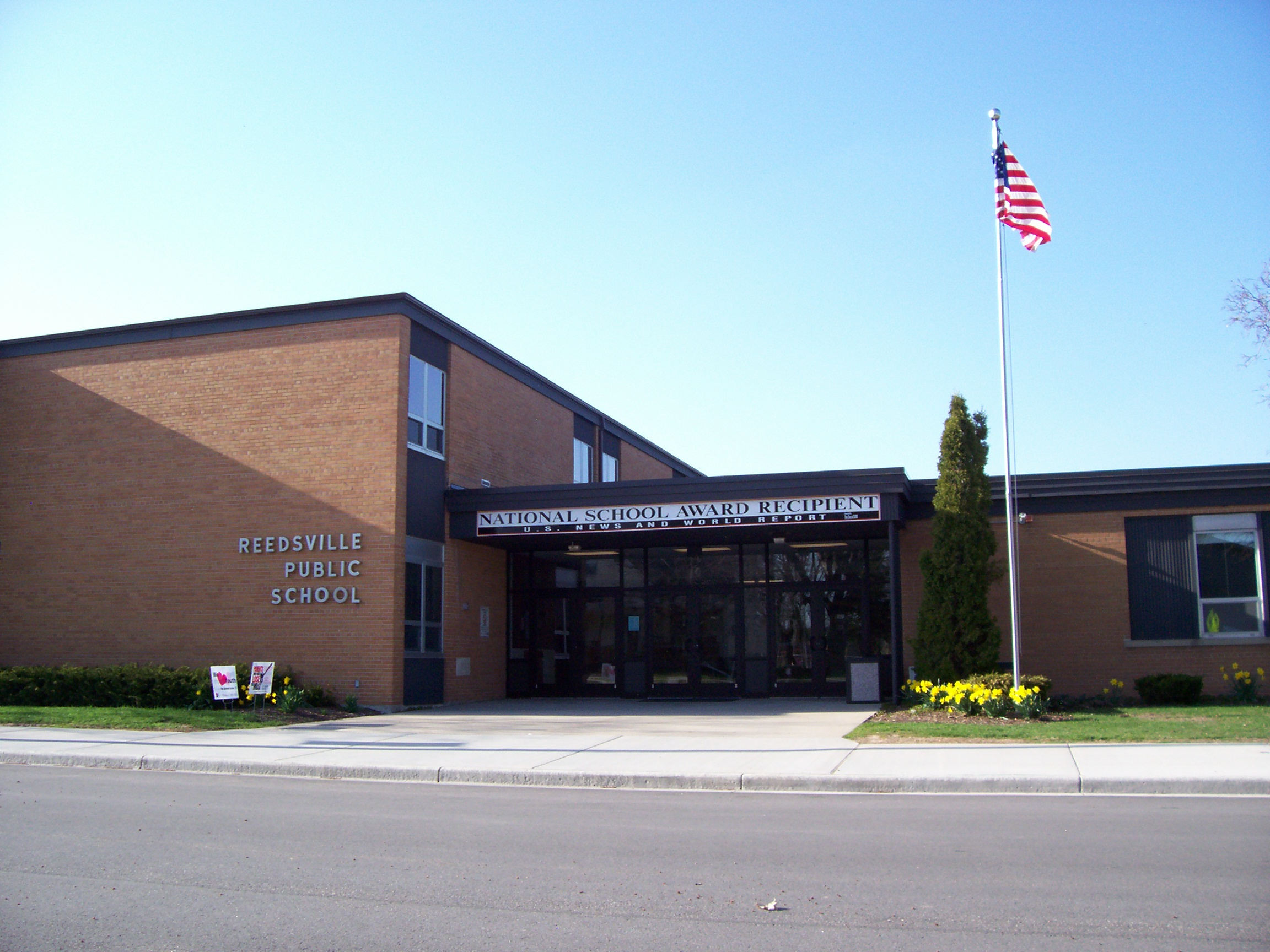
Reedsville Public School

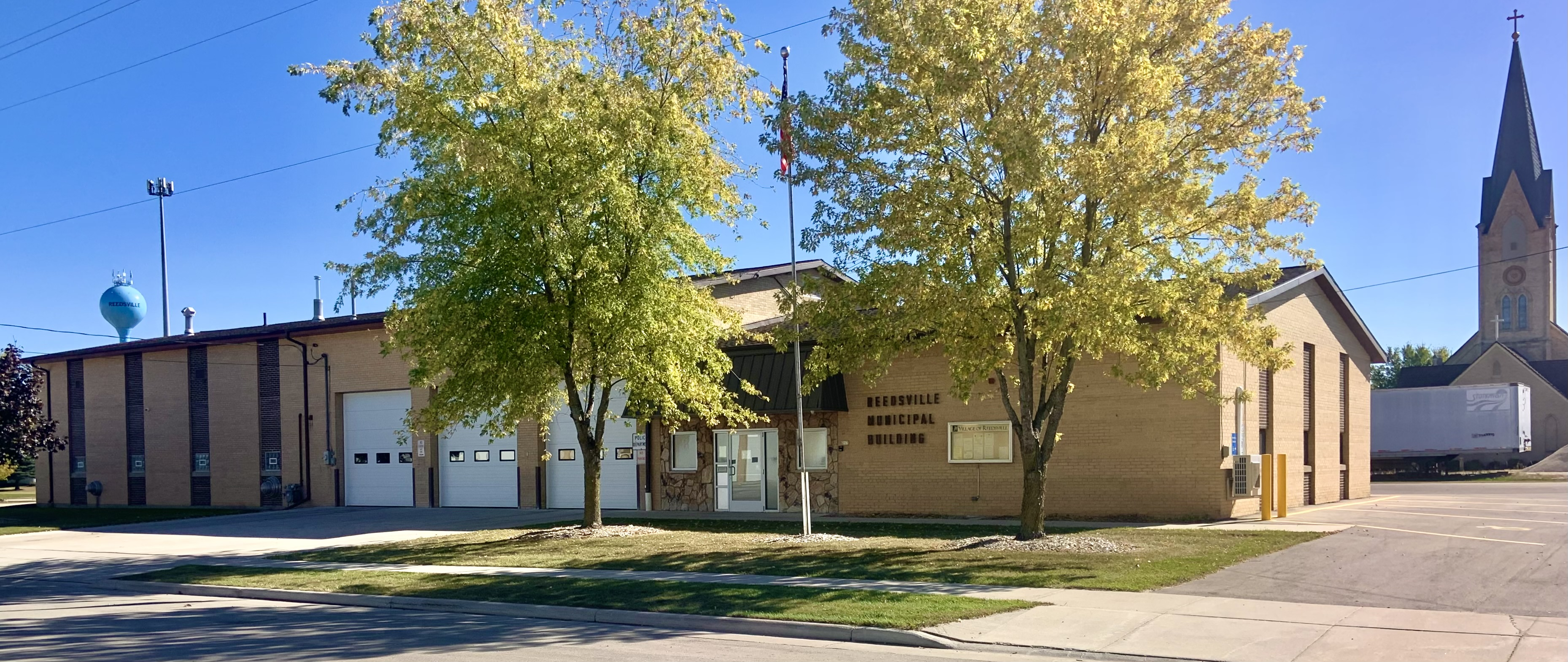
Reedsville Village Hall
