= Granula =

First manufactured breakfast cereal

Granula was the first manufactured breakfast cereal. It was invented by James Caleb Jackson in 1863. Jackson and many of his contemporaries believed that the digestive system was the basis of illness. He therefore began experimenting at his upstate New York health spa with cold cereal as an illness cure; the development of Granula was the outcome of his experiments.

Granula could be described as being a larger and tougher version of the somewhat similar later cereal Grape-Nuts. However, it consisted primarily of bran-rich graham flour made into nugget shapes. The cereal had to be soaked overnight before it could be eaten.

The cereal was manufactured from a dough of graham flour rolled into sheets and baked. The dried sheets were then broken into pieces, baked again, and broken into smaller pieces.

== See also ==
- Granola is the later breakfast cereal developed by John Harvey Kellogg, renamed to avoid being sued by Jackson. Kellogg incorporated a rolling process to flake the grain, making it more palatable. It was subsequently revived in the 1960s as a somewhat similar breakfast cereal.
- Hardtack is the military and naval ration of hard bread that was also commonly soaked before eating.
