= James Caleb Jackson =

American nutritionist (1811–1895)

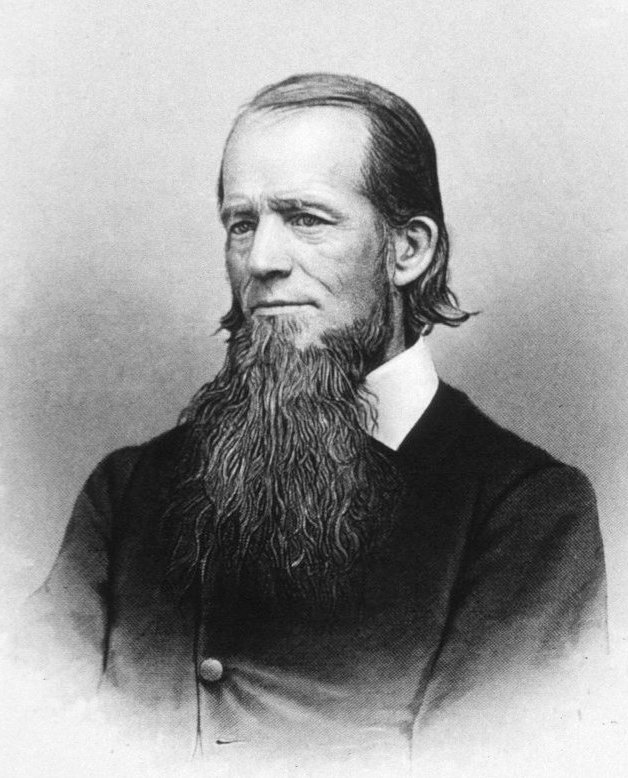
- Born: March 28, 1811; Manlius, Onondaga County, New York, U.S.
- Died: July 11, 1895 (aged 84); Dansville, New York, U.S.
- Occupation: Nutritionist
- Known for: Inventing Granula
- Spouse: Lucretia Edgerton Brewster
- Children: James Hathaway Jackson
- Relatives: Katharine Johnson Jackson (daughter-in-law)

James Caleb Jackson (March 28, 1811 – July 11, 1895) was an American nutritionist and the inventor of the first dry, whole grain breakfast cereal which he called Granula. His views influenced the health reforms of Ellen G. White, a founder of the Seventh-day Adventist Church.

== Biography ==
Jackson was born in Manlius, Onondaga County, New York, to James and Mary Ann Elderkin Jackson. He "spent time" at the Manlius School. After completing his education at Chittenango Polytechnic Institute, he worked as a farmer until 1838. He married Lucretia Edgerton Brewster when he was 19 years old. In his early life, Jackson was active as an abolitionist. He lectured for the Massachusetts Anti-Slavery Society, becoming the society's secretary in 1840. With Nathaniel P. Rogers, starting in 1840 he edited the National Anti-Slavery Standard for about a year. In 1844, with Abel Brown he bought the abolitionist newspaper the Albany Patriot. Jackson managed and wrote for the paper until 1847, when his failing health forced him to retire.

Jackson had been troubled with poor health throughout his life, but he experienced a remarkable recovery after taking a 'water cure' at a spa operated by Silas O. Gleason, the Greenwood Spring Water Cure in Cuba, New York, in 1846–1847. As a result, he spent the second half of his life as an advocate for hydropathy, training to become a physician and opening a hydropathic institute at Glen Haven on Skaneateles Lake in Cortland County, New York, in 1847.

In 1858, he took over the 'Our Home Hygienic Institute' at Dansville, Livingston County, New York. The spa had been founded by Nathaniel Bingham on the site of a mineral water spring some four years earlier. Under Jackson's management, the spa grew to become one of the largest in the world, catering to around 20,000 patients, and was renamed 'Our Home on the Hillside'. Jackson was assisted by his wife, known as "Mother Jackson", and their adopted daughter, Dr. Harriet Newell Austin. The health resort was a Jackson family operation for many years; James Hathaway Jackson (son of James Caleb Jackson) and James Arthur Jackson (son of James Hathaway Jackson and grandson of James Caleb Jackson) were both leaders of the facility. The family referred to it as the Jackson Sanatorium by 1890; the establishment was also known as the Jackson Health Resort.

Along with water cures, Jackson believed that diet was fundamental in improving health. Over time, he removed red meat from the menu at the spa and ruled out tea, coffee, alcohol, and tobacco. Jackson was a vegetarian and promoted a vegetarian diet with emphasis on fruits, vegetables, and unprocessed grains. Jackson believed his diet could cure intemperance and masturbation. Although accepting the use of surgery, he opposed drugs. Jackson was opposed to abortion in any circumstance, describing it as "among the greatest crimes".

In 1863, he developed the first breakfast cereal and named it Granula.

Jackson died on July 11, 1895, in Dansville, Livingston County, New York.

== Publications ==
- 1853 Hints on the Reproductive Organs: Their Diseases, Causes, and Cure on Hydropathic Principles
- 1862 Consumption: How to Prevent It, and How to Cure It
- 1862 The Sexual Organism, and Its Healthful Management
- 1863 Dancing: Its Evils and Its Benefits
- 1870 American Womanhood: Its Peculiarities and Necessities
- 1871 How to Treat the Sick Without Medicine
- 1872 The Training of Children
- 1872 The Debilities of Our Boys
- 1875 Christ as a Physician
- 1879 Tobacco and Its Effect upon the Health and Character of Those Who Use It
- 1882 Morning Watches

== See also ==
- Sylvester Graham (1794–1851), created graham cracker.
- John Harvey Kellogg (1852–1943), started flaked breakfast cereals at his spa.
- Charles William Post (1854–1914), created postum as a patient of Kellogg.
- Maximilian Bircher-Benner (1867–1939), created muesli.
