= Harriet N. Austin =

American author and activist

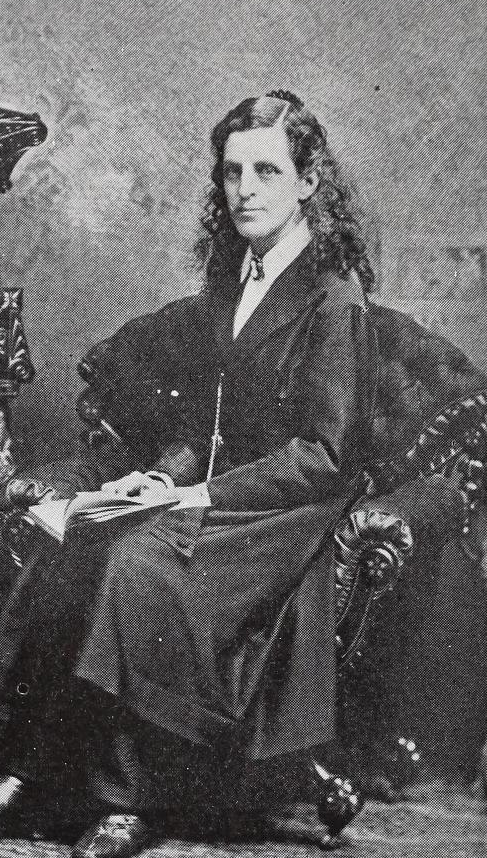
- Born: Harriet Newell Austin; August 31, 1826; Connecticut, U.S.
- Died: May 1891 (aged 64); North Adams, Massachusetts, U.S.
- Occupation(s): Hydrotherapist, writer
- Known for: American costume
- Father: James Caleb Jackson
- Relatives: James Hathaway Jackson

Harriet Newell Austin (August 31, 1826 – May 1891) was an American hydrotherapist, author, and dress-reform advocate. She was the designer of the "American costume," a style of dress meant to promote women's health.

== Early life and education ==
Harriet N. Austin was born in Connecticut on August 31, 1826. She graduated from Mary Gove Nichols' American Hydropathic Institute, in 1851. Because mainstream medical schools did not admit women, she and the other women physicians of this era had to seek training at such "irregular" institutions. Austin and her contemporaries saw the water cure as the basis for a larger reform movement. They were attempting to expand the role of women in society and improve their status in the public sphere by bolstering their health, through hygienic regimens and reformed modes of dress.

== Career ==
After receiving her degree, Austin found work as a physician at a water cure sanitarium in Owasco, New York. During her time there she formed a professional relationship with James Caleb Jackson, who ran a similar facility nearby. After successfully collaborating on a difficult medical case in Owasco, Jackson invited Austin to join him at his sanitarium, Glen Haven, to manage the treatment of female patients. She would go on to become his business partner and editor of their magazine, The Laws of Life and Journal of Health. Jackson and his wife Lucretia even adopted her as their daughter. Austin and the Jacksons moved to Dansville, New York in 1858. They opened a sanitarium there called Our Home on the Hillside, which would become the largest hydrotherapy institution in the country by 1866.

Austin was an early practitioner of natural hygiene and was a vegetarian. She died at North Adams, Massachusetts in May 1891.

== "American costume" ==
At Our Home, female patients wore an "American costume" that Austin designed: a tunic or shortened dress, with hem landing at the knee, worn over loose pants. It was called American costume as a rhetorical contrast with the fashionable, restrictive "French costume" that the dress reform movement sought to eradicate. The garments were designed to minimize restrictions on women's movement and promote health and hygiene. Our Home sold patterns so women could make their own American costumes at home. Austin expressed pride in both her healing abilities and her clothing designs, bridging what would otherwise have been considered separate male and female spheres

Although the reform-minded intent was similar to the Bloomer costume of the same era, Austin thought the fullness of the Bloomer trousers was "slovenly" and worked to distinguish her design from it. American costume was influential among dress reformers for the extent to which it challenged conventions of feminine dress: it was the most masculine in appearance of all the dress reform era designs. Seventh-day Adventist writer and health reformer Ellen G. White used purchased patterns from Our Home to develop her own reform dress. White later publicly disparaged Austin's American costume, exaggerating her account of the shortness of its skirts to question its modesty and propriety. Austin herself was criticized and even ridiculed for dressing too much like a man. She continued to wear her American costume openly until her death in 1891.

== List of publications ==
- The American Costume, or, Women's Right to Good Health (1867)
- Baths and How to Take Them (1861)
- Our Home on the Hillside: What we are trying to do and how we are trying to do it (1870s, with James Jackson)
