= Dansville, Livingston County, New York =

Dansville, New York
- Village
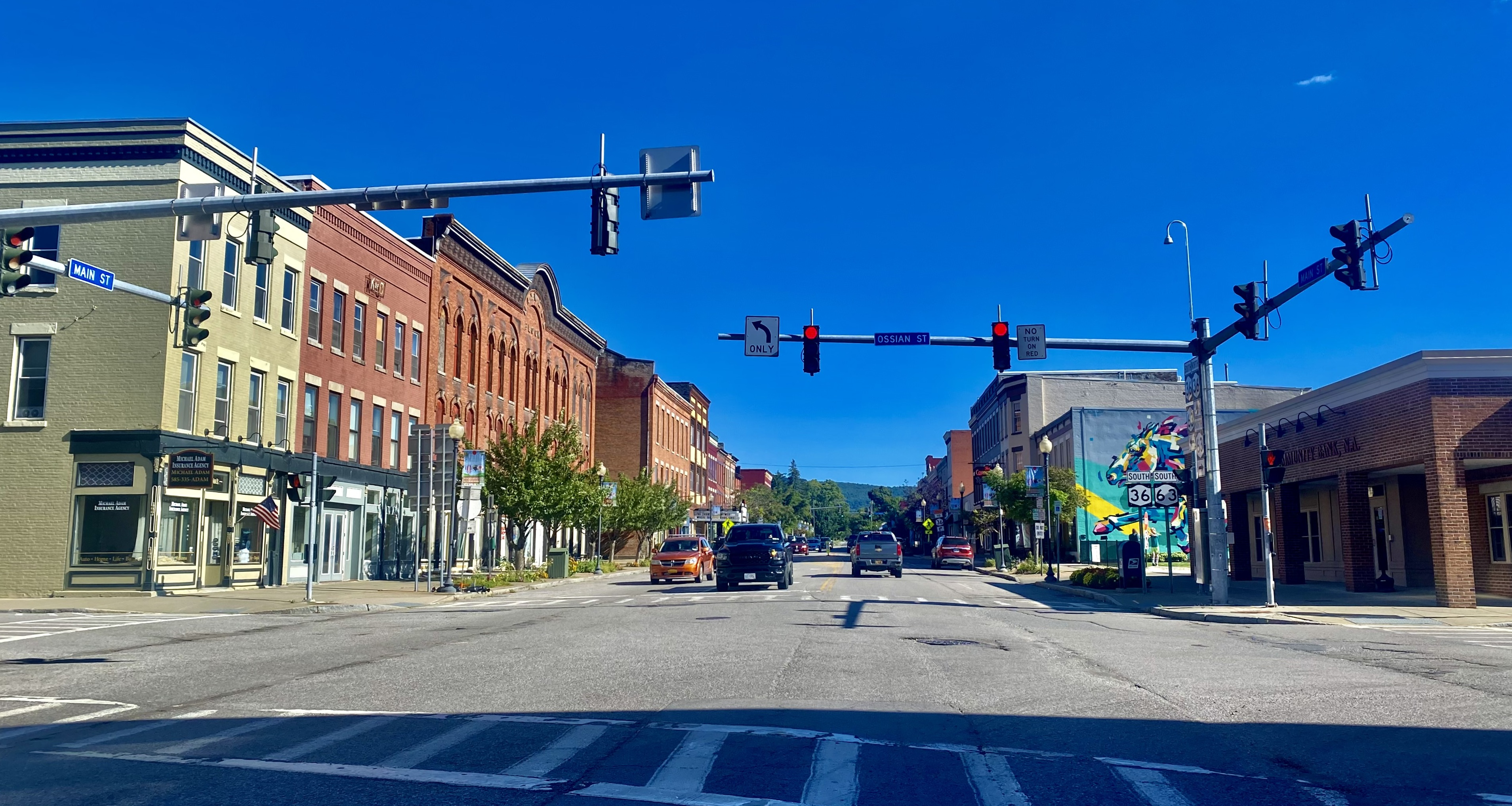
- Main Street in 2022

- Location within New York Location within the United States
- Coordinates: 42°33′N 77°41′W
- Country: United States
- State: New York
- County: Livingston
- Town: North Dansville

Area
  - Total: 2.61 sq mi (6.75 km^{2})
  - Land: 2.61 sq mi (6.75 km^{2})
  - Water: 0 sq mi (0.00 km^{2})
- Elevation: 705 ft (215 m)

Population (2020)
  - Total: 4,433
  - Density: 1,700.0/sq mi (656.36/km^{2})
- Time zone: UTC-5 (Eastern (EST))
  - Summer (DST): UTC-4 (EDT)
- ZIP code: 14437
- Area code: 585
- FIPS code: 36-19664
- GNIS feature ID: 0948024
- Website: www.villageofdansvilleny.gov

Dansville is a village in the town of North Dansville, with a small northern part in the town of Sparta in Livingston County, in western New York, United States. As of the 2020 census, the village population was 4,433. The village is named after Daniel Faulkner, an early European-American settler. Interstate 390 passes the west side of the village.

== History ==
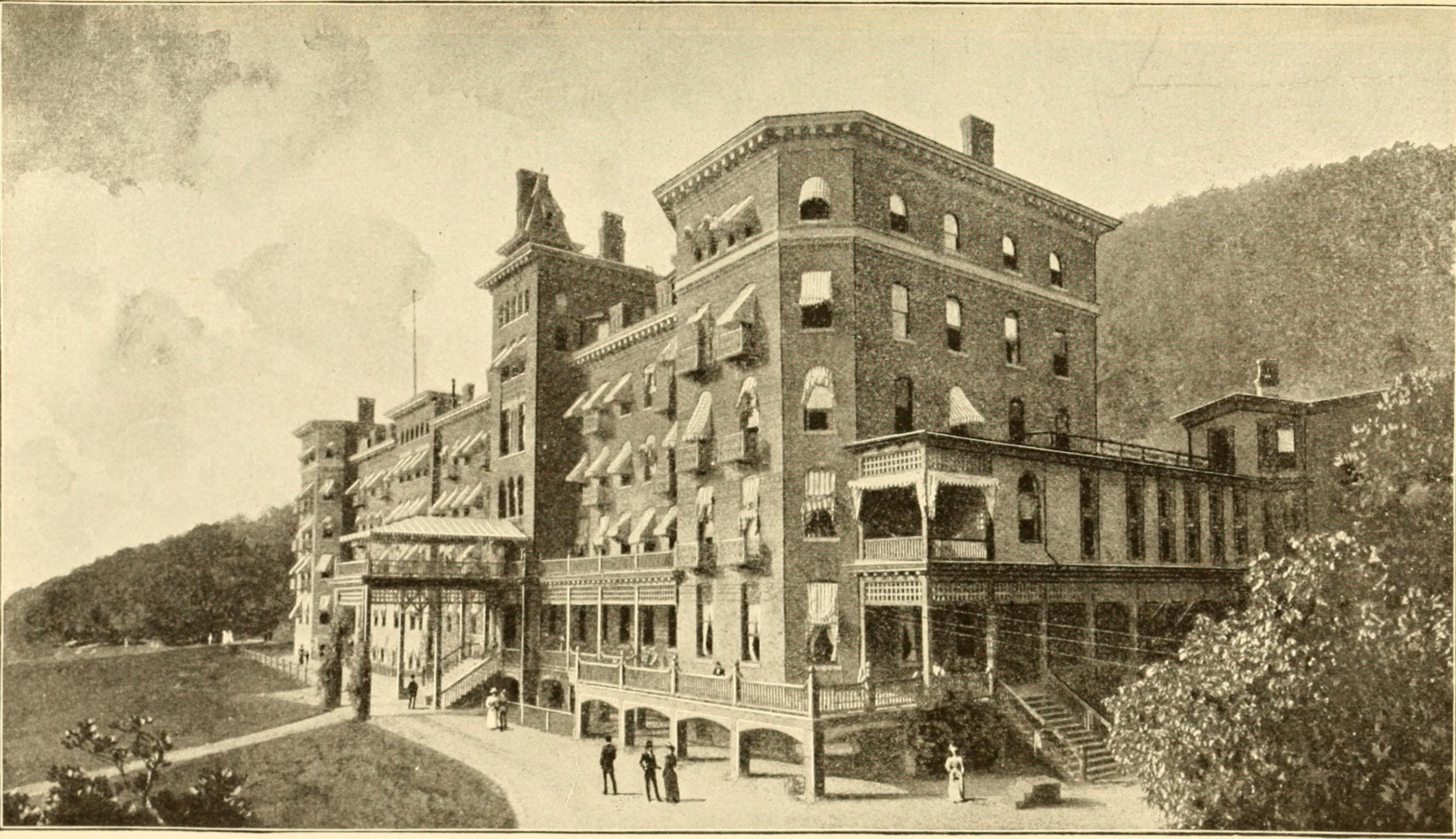
Sanitorium in 1897

A spa was opened in 1854, eventually attracting many prominent people to Dansville for the water cure. After a quick series of unsuccessful owners, it was purchased in September 1858 by new owners who recruited James Caleb Jackson as the physician-in-charge. He was assisted by his wife, known as "Mother Jackson", and their adopted daughter, Dr. Harriet Newell Austin. A Jackson family operation for many years, the family referred to it as the Jackson Sanatorium by 1890.

== Geography ==
According to the United States Census Bureau, the village has a total area of 2.6 square miles (6.8 km^{2}), all land. The village sits in a glacially formed valley, common throughout western New York. Canaseraga Creek flows northward just west of the village limits; it is a tributary of the Genesee River.

Interstate 390, New York State Route 36, New York State Route 63, New York State Route 256, and New York State Route 436 pass through the village. It is bordered to the northwest by the unincorporated community of Cumminsville. Geneseo, the Livingston county seat, is 18 miles (29 km) to the northwest, Hornell is 17 miles (27 km) to the south, Corning is 51 miles (82 km) to the southeast, and Rochester is 44 to 53 miles (71 to 85 km) to the north, depending on which highway one takes. Stony Brook State Park, with waterfalls, hiking, and swimming, is 3 miles (5 km) south of the village.

=== Climate ===
Climate data for Dansville, New York (1991-2020 normals)
Month	Jan	Feb	Mar	Apr	May	Jun	Jul	Aug	Sep	Oct	Nov	Dec	Year
Mean daily maximum °C (°F)	34.6 (1.4)	36.7 (2.6)	45.0 (7.2)	58.3 (14.6)	71.2 (21.8)	79.2 (26.2)	83.2 (28.4)	81.7 (27.6)	75.3 (24.1)	62.7 (17.1)	50.1 (10.1)	39.8 (4.3)	59.8 (15.4)
Daily mean °C (°F)	25.7 (−3.5)	27.1 (−2.7)	34.8 (1.6)	46.7 (8.2)	58.8 (14.9)	67.6 (19.8)	71.7 (22.1)	70.1 (21.2)	63.4 (17.4)	51.7 (10.9)	41.0 (5.0)	31.8 (−0.1)	49.2 (9.6)
Mean daily minimum °C (°F)	16.8 (−8.4)	17.5 (−8.1)	24.6 (−4.1)	35.1 (1.7)	46.4 (8.0)	55.9 (13.3)	60.1 (15.6)	58.5 (14.7)	51.5 (10.8)	40.8 (4.9)	31.9 (−0.1)	23.8 (−4.6)	38.6 (3.7)
Average rainfall mm (inches)	1.42 (36)	1.41 (36)	1.96 (50)	2.43 (62)	2.95 (75)	3.17 (81)	3.87 (98)	3.46 (88)	3.12 (79)	3.22 (82)	2.33 (59)	2.02 (51)	31.36 (797)

== Demographics ==
Historical population
Census	Pop.	Note	%±
1870	3,387		—
1880	3,625		7.0%
1890	3,758		3.7%
1900	3,633		−3.3%
1910	3,938		8.4%
1920	4,631		17.6%
1930	4,928		6.4%
1940	4,976		1.0%
1950	5,253		5.6%
1960	5,460		3.9%
1970	5,436		−0.4%
1980	4,979		−8.4%
1990	5,002		0.5%
2000	4,832		−3.4%
2010	4,719		−2.3%
2020	4,433		−6.1%
U.S. Decennial Census

As of the census of 2000, there were 4,832 people, 1,976 households, and 1,246 families residing in the village. The population density was 2,042.4 inhabitants per square mile (788.6/km^{2}). There were 2,090 housing units at an average density of 883.4 per square mile (341.1/km^{2}). The racial makeup of the village was 95.78% White, 1.26% African American, 0.23% Native American, 0.66% Asian, 1.30% from other races, and 0.77% from two or more races. Hispanic or Latino of any race were 2.07% of the population.

There were 1,912 households, out of which 34.0% had children under the age of 18 living with them, 46.7% were married couples living together, 14.2% had a female householder with no husband present, and 34.8% were non-families. 28.6% of all households were made up of individuals, and 14.0% had someone living alone who was 65 years of age or older. The average household size was 2.49 and the average family size was 3.03.

In the village, the population was spread out, with 26.7% under the age of 18, 8.7% from 18 to 24, 27.5% from 25 to 44, 21.3% from 45 to 64, and 15.7%

The median income for a household in the village was $32,903, and the median income for a family was $41,519. Males had a median income of $31,699 versus $25,256 for females. The per capita income for the village was $15,994. About 12.3% of families and 17.0% of the population were below the poverty line, including 17.3% of those under age 18 and 11.7% of those age 65 or over.

== Infrastructure ==
Dansville Municipal Airport (DSV) is a general aviation airport located north of the village. The airport was opened in 1927, primarily by the efforts of World War I aviator Lynn Pickard. The New York State Festival of Balloons is held at the airport in early September.

A branch of Genesee Community College is located in Dansville.

Nicholas H. Noyes Memorial Hospital, a 72-bed acute care hospital, is located on the southern edge of the village on Route 36 adjacent to Exit 4 on Interstate 390. It provides health services to residents of Livingston, Allegany, Steuben and surrounding counties.

== Culture ==
Castle on the Hill is a former water cure facility that resembles a castle overlooking Dansville from the hillside. Founded in 1858 by Dr. James Caleb Jackson as "Our Home on the Hillside", the original building burned in 1882. The present building opened in 1883. It has changed hands several times, becoming a physical fitness hotel (the Physical Culture Hotel) where the rich and famous came from New York City and other areas to "get away from it all". The building now^{When?} stands vacant.

A grant from New York State for $2.5 million was approved in January 2008 to renovate the former "Jackson Health Resort".

== Notable people ==
- Harriet N. Austin, physician and dress reform advocate; grew up in Dansville
- Clara Barton resided in Dansville, where she established the first American Red Cross chapter in 1881.
- Edward T. Fairchild, Wisconsin jurist; raised in Dansville
- Millard Fillmore, 13th president of the United States; resided in the village for several months
- Job E. Hedges, Republican nominee for governor of New York in 1912
- Dennis Walter Hickey, Auxiliary Bishop of Rochester, New York
- James Caleb Jackson, created Granula, the world's first breakfast cereal
- Andrew J. Lorish, Union Army soldier and Medal of Honor recipient; born in Dansville in 1832
- Nathaniel Rochester, founder of Rochester, New York.
- Edwin F. Sweet, Assistant Secretary of Commerce
- John Sullivan, Major League Baseball catcher and coach

== Gallery ==
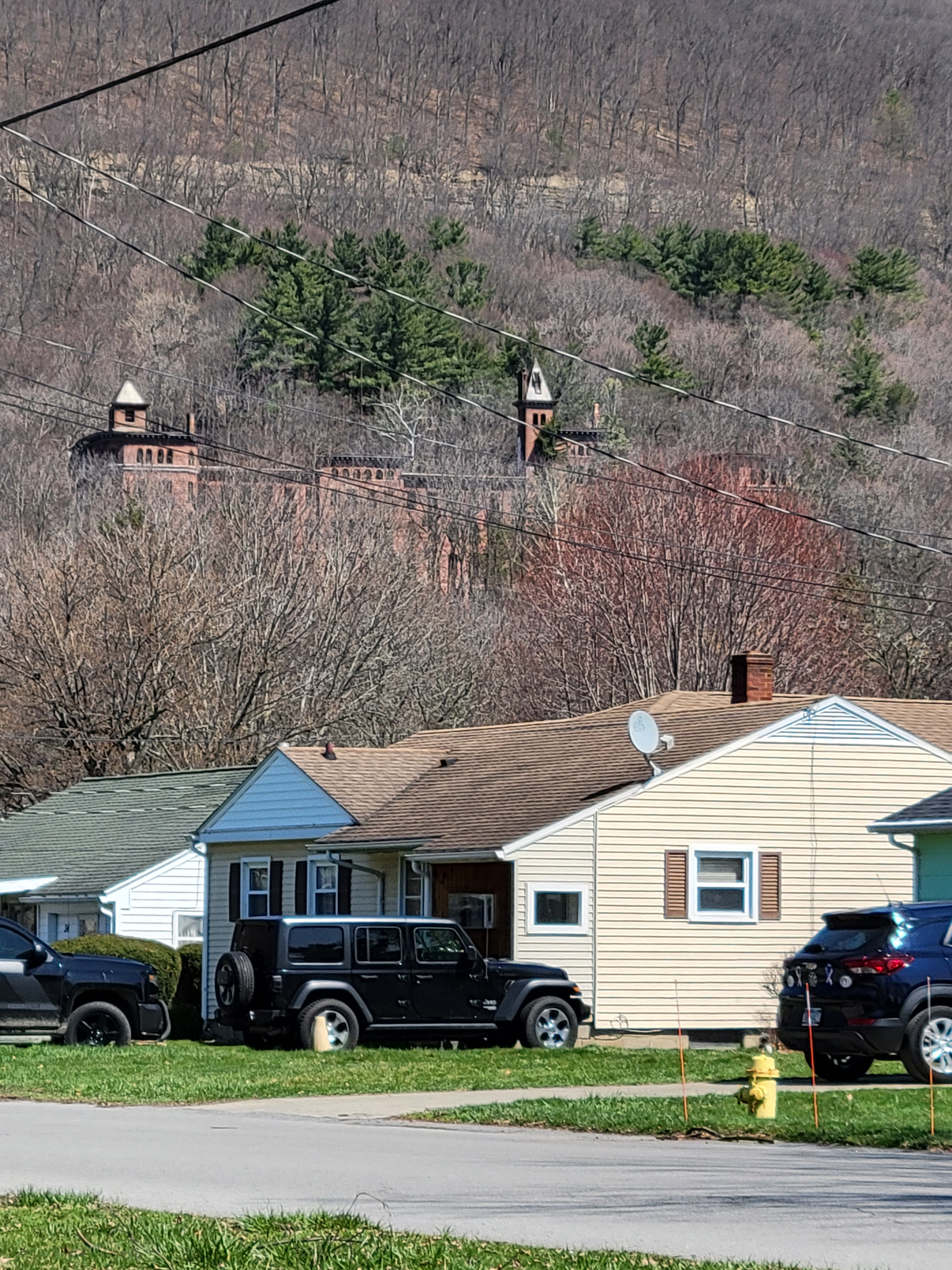
The Castle on the Hill in 2023

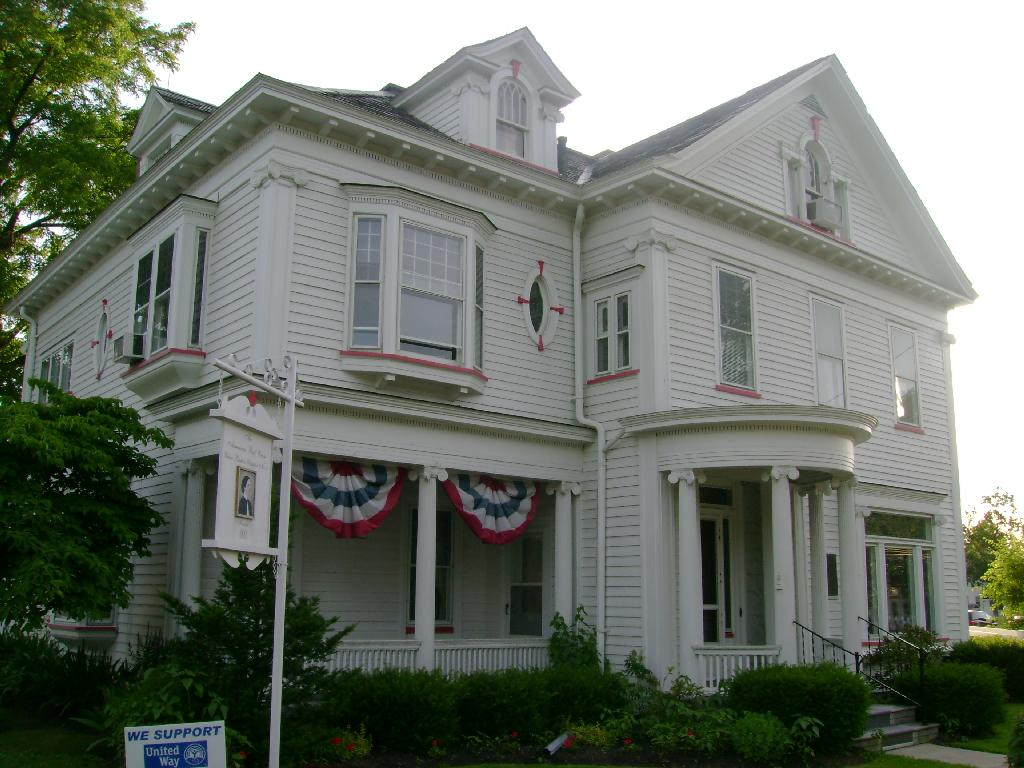
First chapter of the American Red Cross at the corner of Elizabeth and Ossian Streets
