= List of Anglican churches =

Catalogue of churches throughout the Anglican Communion

This is a list of Anglican churches that are notable as congregations or as church buildings or both.

The Anglican Communion is an international association of churches consisting of the Church of England and of national and regional Anglican churches (and a few other episcopal churches) in full communion with it There is no single "Anglican Church" with universal juridical authority as each national or regional church has full autonomy. Some of these churches are known as Anglican, such as the Anglican Church of Canada, due to their historical link to England (Ecclesia Anglicana means "English Church"). Some, for example the Church of Ireland, the Scottish and American Episcopal churches, and some other associated churches have a separate name.

In the United States the Episcopal Church, also known formally as the "Protestant Episcopal Church in the United States of America", is the Anglican church; it separated from the Church of England following the American Revolution. In Scotland the Episcopal Church is also the name for the Anglican church.

There are numerous Methodist Episcopal churches which are not part of the Anglican church; see List of Methodist churches for these.

== United Kingdom ==
=== England ===
==== East ====
- Chelmsford Cathedral
- Church of St Mary the Great, Cambridge
- Ely Cathedral
- Greensted Church
- Holy Trinity Church, Long Melford
- King's Lynn Minster
- Norwich Cathedral
- Peterborough Cathedral
- St Albans Cathedral
- St Edmundsbury Cathedral
- St Helen's, Ranworth
- St Mary's, East Bergholt
- St Michael the Archangel, Framlingham
- St Nicholas, Blakeney
- St Peter and St Paul's Church, Lavenham
- St Peter and St Paul's Church, Salle
- St Peter Mancroft, Norwich
- Wymondham Abbey

==== East Midlands ====
- All Saints' Church, Northampton
- Derby Cathedral
- Lincoln Cathedral
- St Andrew's Church, Sempringham
- St Botolph's Church, Boston
- St Mary and All Saints, Chesterfield
- St Mary the Virgin's Church, Bottesford
- St Mary's Church, Nottingham
- St Wulfram's Church, Grantham
- Southwell Minster

===== Leicester =====
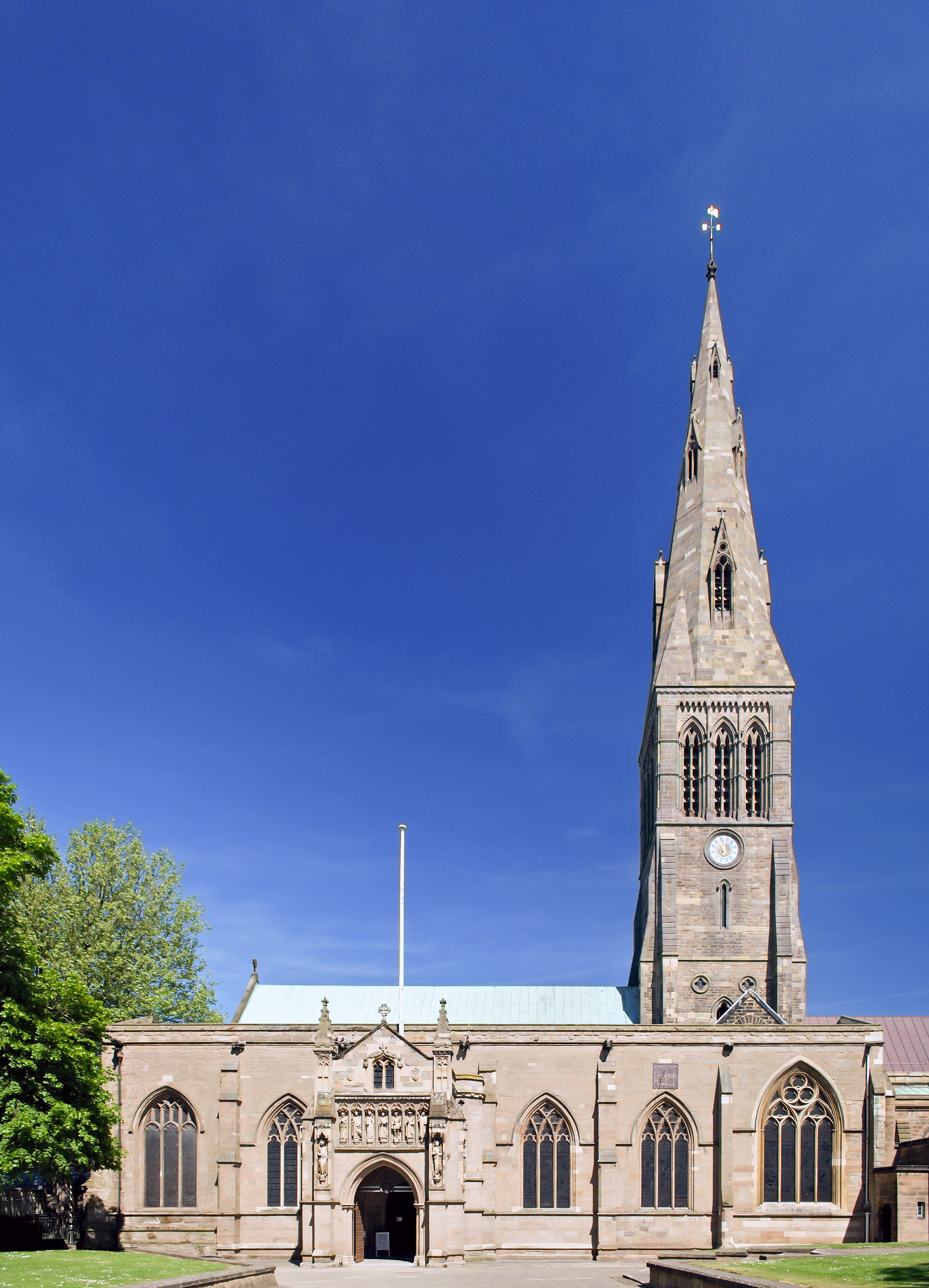
Leicester Cathedral

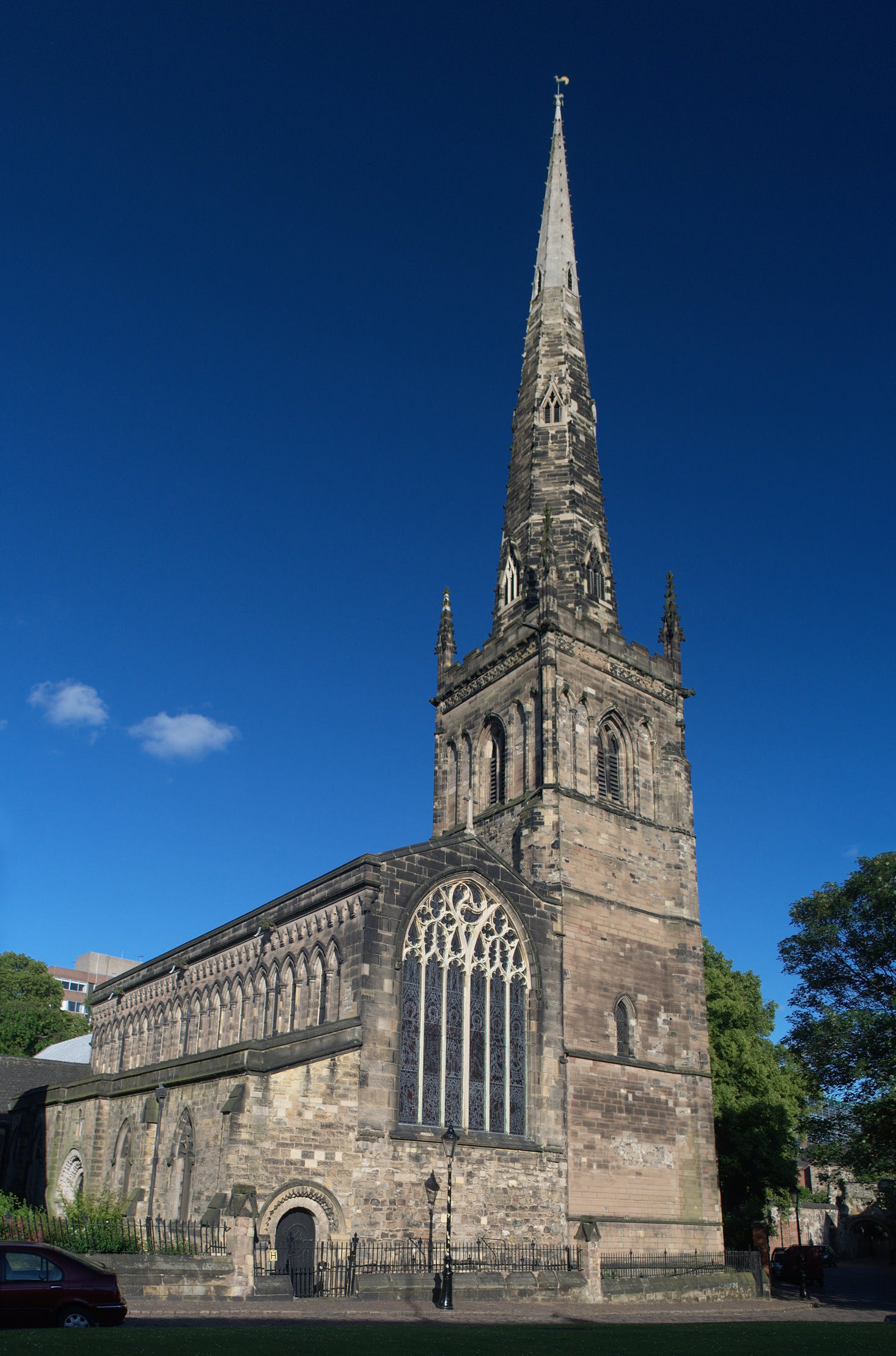
Church of St Mary de Castro, Leicester

- Church of St Mary de Castro, Leicester, Castle Yard
- Cathedral Church of St Martin, Leicester
- Holy Trinity Church, Leicester, Regent Road
- St James the Greater, Leicester, London Road
- St Margaret's Church, Leicester, St Margaret's Way

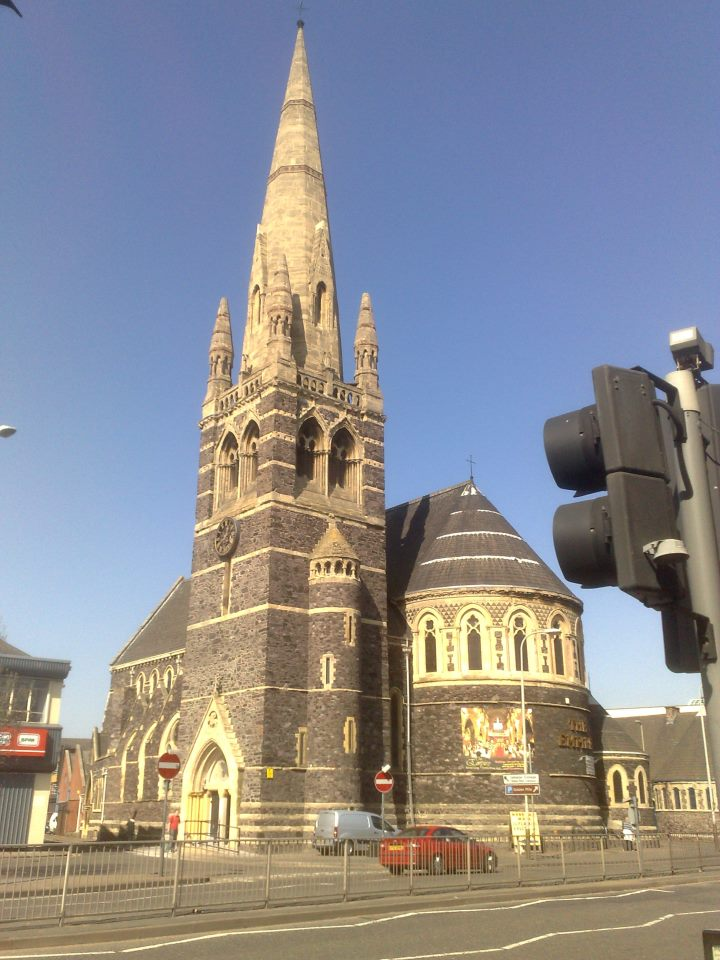
St Mark's, Belgrave - The Empire Conference Centre

- St Nicholas' Church, Leicester, St Nicholas Circle
- St Peter's Church, Leicester, St Peter's Road
- St Mark's Church, Leicester, Belgrave Gate, formerly a church, now "The Empire" Conference Centre
- St Matthew's, Leicester, Montreal Road, formerly a church
- St Paul's Church, Leicester, Kirby Road, formerly a church

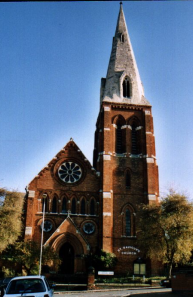
St Saviour, St Saviour's Road. 2005

- St Saviour's Church, Leicester, St Saviour's Road

==== Greater London ====
- All Hallows-by-the-Tower
- All Saints, Margaret Street
- All Souls Church, Langham Place
- Christ Church Spitalfields
- Croydon Minster
- Guards Chapel, Wellington Barracks
- Holy Trinity, Sloane Street
- St Alfege Church, Greenwich
- St Andrew's, Enfield
- St Anne's Church, Kew
- St Anne's, Limehouse
- St Augustine's, Queen's Gate
- St Bartholomew-the-Great
- St Benet Paul's Wharf
- St Botolph's Aldgate
- St Bride's Church
- St Clement Danes
- St Cuthbert's, Earls Court
- St Dunstan's, Stepney
- St George the Martyr, Southwark
- St George's, Hanover Square
- St James's Church, Piccadilly
- St John-at-Hampstead
- St John's Wood Church
- St Lawrence Jewry
- St Margaret's Church, Westminster
- St Martin-in-the-Fields
- St Mary Abbots
- St Mary-le-Bow
- St Mary le Strand
- St Mary's Church, Battersea
- St Mary's Church, Harrow on the Hill
- St Michael and All Angels, Bedford Park
- St Paul's Cathedral
- St. Paul's Church, Covent Garden
- St Paul's, Deptford
- St Peter's Church, Petersham
- St Stephen Walbrook
- Savoy Chapel
- Southwark Cathedral
- Westminster Abbey

==== North East ====
- Durham Cathedral
- Hexham Abbey
- Newcastle Cathedral
- Sunderland Minster

==== North West ====
- Blackburn Cathedral
- Bolton Abbey
- Carlisle Cathedral
- Chester Cathedral
- Lancaster Priory
- Liverpool Cathedral
- Manchester Cathedral

==== South East ====
- All Saints' Church, Hillesden
- All Saints' Church, Wing
- Canterbury Cathedral
- Chichester Cathedral
- Christ Church Cathedral, Oxford
- Dorchester Abbey
- Guildford Cathedral
- Portsmouth Cathedral
- Rochester Cathedral
- St Augustine's Church, Brookland
- St George's Chapel, Windsor Castle
- St Giles' Church, Stoke Poges
- St Lawrence's Church, West Wycombe
- St John the Baptist, Burford
- St Martin's Church, Canterbury
- St Mary the Virgin, Oxford
- St Mary the Virgin, Sompting
- Winchester Cathedral

==== South West ====
- Bath Abbey
- Bristol Cathedral
- Christchurch Priory
- Exeter Cathedral
- Gloucester Cathedral
- Holy Epiphany Church, Muscliff
- St Andrew's Church, Boscombe, Dorset
- St Andrew's Church, Boscombe, Wiltshire
- St Andrew's Church, Malmesbury Park
- St Andrew's Church, Mells
- St Christopher's Church, Southbourne
- St Francis of Assisi's Church, Bournemouth
- St James's Church, Pokesdown
- St John the Baptist, Cirencester
- St Katharine's Church, Southbourne
- St Leonard's Church, Sheepstor
- St Luke's Church, Winton
- St Mark's Church, Bournemouth
- St Mary's Church, Fairford
- St Mary's Church, Oare
- St Mary's Priory Church, Deerhurst
- St Mary's Church, Springbourne
- St Michael and All Angels' Church, East Coker
- St Pancras, Widecombe-in-the-Moor
- Salisbury Cathedral
- Sherborne Abbey
- Tewkesbury Abbey
- Truro Cathedral
- Wells Cathedral
- Wimborne Minster

==== West Midlands ====
- Coventry Cathedral
- Hereford Cathedral
- Lichfield Cathedral
- Malvern Priory
- St Mary and St David, Kilpeck
- St Michael and All Angels, Great Witley
- St Paul's Leamington Spa
- St Philip's Cathedral, Birmingham
- Shrewsbury Abbey
- Worcester Cathedral

==== Yorkshire ====
- All Saints, Harlow Hill
- Beverley Minster
- Bradford Cathedral
- Church of the Epiphany, Gipton
- Halifax Minster
- Howden Minster
- Leeds Minster
- Ripon Cathedral
- St George's Minster, Doncaster
- St Gregory's Minster
- St James' Church, Wetherby
- St John the Divine, Calder Grove
- St Mark, Old Leeds Road
- St Mark's Church, Sheffield
- St Mary's Church, Whitby
- St Michael and all Angels, Beckwithshaw
- St Robert's Church, Pannal
- St Silas Church, Sheffield
- St Thomas the Apostle, Killinghall
- St Thomas, Thurstonland
- Selby Abbey
- Sheffield Cathedral
- Wakefield Cathedral
- York Minster

=== Northern Ireland ===
Throughout Ireland, including the North, the term Church of Ireland is used.

- St Anne's Cathedral, Belfast
- St Columb's Cathedral, Derry
- St George's Church, Belfast
- St Patrick's Cathedral, Armagh
- Down Cathedral
- Drumcree Church

=== Scotland ===
In Scotland the term Episcopal church is used.

- Cathedral of The Isles
- Inverness Cathedral
- St Andrew's Cathedral, Aberdeen
- St John's Cathedral, Oban
- St Mary's Cathedral, Edinburgh
- St Mary's Cathedral, Glasgow
- St Ninian's Cathedral, Perth
- St Paul's Cathedral, Dundee

=== Wales ===
- Bangor Cathedral
- Brecon Cathedral
- Llandaff Cathedral
- Newport Cathedral
- St Asaph Cathedral
- St David's Cathedral

== Australia ==
- St Andrew's Cathedral, Sydney
- St David's Cathedral, Hobart
- St George's Cathedral, Perth
- St John's Cathedral (Brisbane)
- St Paul's Cathedral, Melbourne
- St Peter's Cathedral, Adelaide

== Canada ==
- List of Anglican churches in Toronto
- List of Anglican cathedrals in Canada
- St. Paul's Church (Halifax)

== Caribbean ==
- Cathedral Church of St Michael and All Angels, Barbados
- Holy Trinity Cathedral, Port of Spain
- St. George's Cathedral, Georgetown, Guyana
- St Jaco de la Vega Cathedral, Spanish Town

== Europe (including the Republic of Ireland) ==
- All Saints' Church, Rome
- Anglican Church (Bucharest)
- Cathedral Church of the Holy Trinity, Paris
- Cathedral of the Holy Trinity, Gibraltar
- Cathedral of the Redeemer, Madrid
- Christ Church, Amsterdam
- Christ Church Cathedral, Dublin
- Christ Church, Lausanne
- Christ Church, Vienna
- Church of the Holy Trinity, Sliema
- Church of St Augustine of Canterbury, Wiesbaden
- Crimea Memorial Church, Istanbul
- Holy Trinity, Brussels
- Holy Trinity Church, Geneva
- St. Alban's Church, Copenhagen
- St. Andrew's Anglican Church, Moscow
- St. Edmund's Church, Oslo
- St Fin Barre's Cathedral, Cork
- St. George's Anglican Church, Berlin
- St George's Anglican Church, Madrid
- St George's Church, Barcelona
- St. George's Church, Lisbon
- St George's Church, Venice
- Saint George's Memorial Church, Ypres
- St Mark's English Church, Florence
- St Mary's Cathedral, Limerick
- St. Olaf's Church, Balestrand
- St Patrick's Cathedral, Dublin
- St Paul's Cathedral, Lisbon
- St Paul's Pro-Cathedral, Valletta
- St Paul's Within the Walls, Rome
- St Peter and St Sigfrid's Church, Stockholm
- St. Saviour's Church, Riga
- St Ursula's Church, Bern

== India ==
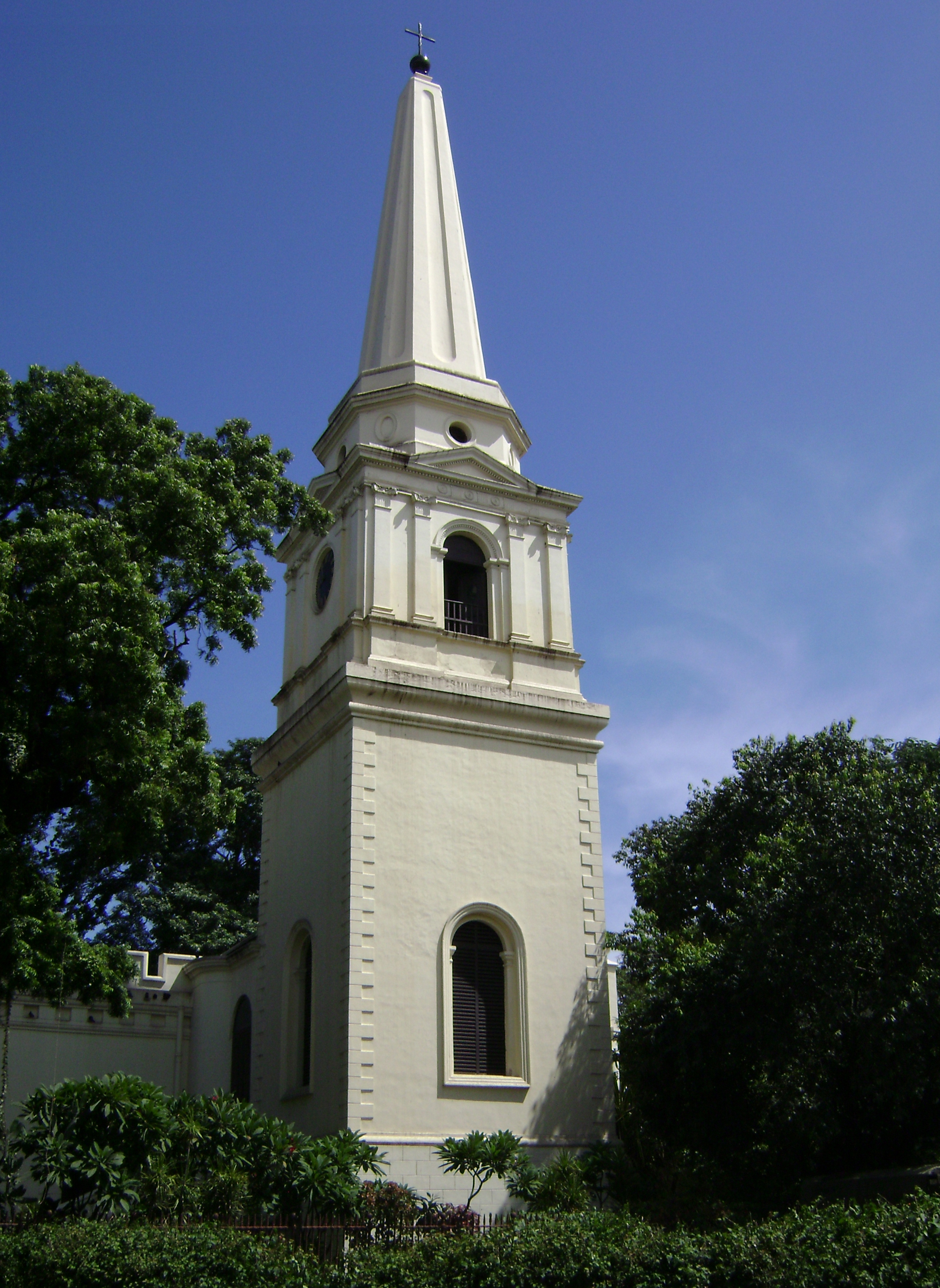
St. Mary's Church, Chennai

- All Saints Cathedral, Allahabad
- All Saints C.S.I Church, Perumbavoor
- All Saints Church, Secunderabad
- All Souls Church, Kanpur, Church of North India
- Diocese of Assam
- Christ Church Cathedral, Amritsar, Church of North India
- Christ Church, Kanpur, Church of North India
- Church of Episcopal Fellowship International, CEFI Vellore, TN, India
- Holy Trinity Cathedral, Palayamkottai
- Holy Trinity Church, Bolarum
- Holy Trinity Church, Yercaud
- Medak Cathedral
- Millenium Methodist Church (Secunderabad)
- St. Francis Church, Kochi
- St. George's Cathedral, Chennai
- St. James' Church, Delhi
- St. John in the Wilderness
- St. John's Church, Meerut
- St. John's Church, Secunderabad
- St. Mary's Church, Chennai
- St. Mary's Church, Chennai. First Anglican Church in India.
- St. Paul's Cathedral, Kolkata
- Saint Pauls Church, Amritsar, Church of North India
- St. Paul's Church, Landour
- St. Thomas Anglican Church, Saharanpur
- St. Thomas (SPG) Cathedral, Secunderabad
- Thachanallur Pastorate
- Wesley Church (Secunderabad)

== Israel ==
- Christ Church, Jerusalem
- St. George's Cathedral, Jerusalem

== Malaysia and Singapore ==
- Christ Church, Malacca
- St Andrew's Cathedral, Singapore
- St. George's Church, Penang
- St. Mary's Cathedral, Kuala Lumpur

== New Zealand ==
- All Saints' Church, Hokitika
- Holy Trinity Cathedral, Auckland
- Saint Paul's Cathedral, Wellington
- St James Church, Franz Josef
- St Mary's Church, Tikitiki

== Nigeria ==
- All Saints Anglican Church, Abuja
- Cathedral Church of Christ, Lagos
- St. Barnabas Anglican Church, Port Harcourt
- St. Matthews Anglican Church, Abuja
- St. Paul's Cathedral, Port Harcourt
- St. Stephen's Cathedral Bonny

== Philippines ==
The Philippine Independent Church, which split from the Roman Catholic church, has been in full communion with the Episcopal Church in the United States, and through it, the entire Anglican Communion, since 1960. One of its major churches is Iglesia Filipina Independiente National Cathedral. See List of Philippine Independent Church churches. There are also other Anglican churches in the Philippines such as the Episcopal Church in the Philippines and the Anglican Church in the Philippines (Traditional) Inc.

== South Africa ==
- St. George's Cathedral, Cape Town
- St. Joseph's Church, Bishop Lavis Town
- St Mary's Cathedral, Johannesburg

== South Georgia ==
- Norwegian Anglican Church, Grytviken

== Taiwan ==
- Church of the Good Shepherd (Taipei)
- St. John's Episcopal Cathedral, Taipei

== United States ==
In the United States, the term Episcopal church is used. This section provides a List of Episcopal churches in the United States. See also List of the Episcopal cathedrals of the United States.

Organized by state then city, with separate lists of historic Maryland parishes at end.

Church	Image	Dates	Location	City, state	Description
Grace Episcopal Church (Anniston, Alabama)		1882-85 built 1985 NRHP-listed	1000 Leighton Ave.33°39′27″N 85°49′31″W	Anniston, Alabama	
St. Michael and All Angels Episcopal Church (Anniston, Alabama)		1888 built 1978 NRHP-listed	West 18th Street33°40′01″N 85°50′37″W	Anniston, Alabama	
Episcopal Church of the Advent (Birmingham, Alabama)		1883 built 1983 NRHP-listed	2017 6th Avenue North33°31′09″N 86°48′30″W	Birmingham, Alabama	Now the "Cathedral Church of the Advent".
Saint Andrew's Episcopal Church (Birmingham, Alabama)		1915 built 1986 NRHP-listed	1164 Eleventh Ave. S33°29′43.67″N 86°48′27.84″W	Birmingham, Alabama	
St. Luke's Episcopal Church (Browns, Alabama)		1854 built 1876 moved 2006-07 moved 1982 NRHP-listed	32°19′09″N 87°06′19″W	Browns, Alabama	
Grace Episcopal Church (Clayton, Alabama)		built 1995 NRHP-listed	Louisville St.31°52′38″N 85°27′0″W	Clayton, Alabama	
Episcopal Church of the Nativity (Huntsville, Alabama)		1859 built 1974 NRHP; NHL 1990	212 Eustis Avenue34°43′48.19″N 86°35′0.27″W	Huntsville, Alabama	
St. Paul's Episcopal Church (Magnolia Springs, Alabama)		10-1 built 1988 NRHP-listed	Oak Ave.30°24′5″N 87°46′17″W	Magnolia Springs, Alabama	
Saint Paul's Episcopal Chapel (Mobile, Alabama)		1859 built 1984 NRHP-listed	30°41′53″N 88°8′21″W	Mobile, Alabama	
Trinity Episcopal Church (Mobile, Alabama)		1853-57 built 1990 NRHP-listed	1900 Dauphin Street30°41′12″N 88°5′9″W	Mobile, Alabama	
St. John's Episcopal Church (Montgomery, Alabama)		1854-55 built 1975 NRHP-listed	113 Madison Ave.32°22′49″N 86°18′26″W	Montgomery, Alabama	Gothic Revival
Grace Episcopal Church (Mount Meigs, Alabama)		1892 built 1982 NRHP-listed	Pike Rd.32°21′18″N 86°5′51″W	Mount Meigs, Alabama	Carpenter Gothic
St. Paul's Episcopal Church (Selma, Alabama)		1871-75 built 1975 NRHP-listed	210 Lauderdale Street32°24′31″N 87°1′18″W	Selma, Alabama	
Mission Church		1917 built 1977 NRHP-listed	E fork of Chandalar River68°7′32″N 145°20′25″W	Arctic Village, Alaska	Log & sod construction
St. Peter's Episcopal Church (Seward, Alaska)		1906 built 1979 NRHP-listed	239 2nd Avenue60°6′10″N 149°26′39″W	Seward, Alaska	Bungalow/Craftsman
St. Philip's Episcopal Church (Wrangell, Alaska)		1903 built 1987 NRHP-listed	446 Church Street56°28′11″N 132°22′43″W	Wrangell, Alaska	
St. John's Episcopal Church (Globe, Arizona)		1907 built 1977 NRHP-listed	185 E. Oak St.33°23′47.1″N 110°47′11.15″W	Globe, Arizona	
St. Paul's Episcopal Church (Tombstone, Arizona)		1882 built 1971 NRHP-listed	Safford and 3rd Sts.31°42′54″N 110°04′04″W	Tombstone, Arizona	
St. Philip's in the Hills Episcopal Church		1936 built 2004 NRHP-listed	32°17′17″N 110°56′36″W	Tucson, Arizona	
St. Paul's Episcopal Church (Yuma, Arizona)		1909 built 1982 NRHP-listed	637 2nd Ave32°42′54″N 114°37′16″W	Yuma, Arizona	
St. Barnabas Episcopal Church (Foreman, Arkansas)		1895 built 1998 NRHP-listed	Tracy Lawrence Ave. and Bell St.33°43′51″N 94°23′43″W	Foreman, Arkansas	
St. Mark's Episcopal Church (Hope, Arkansas)		1905 built 1976 NRHP-listed	33°39′59″N 93°35′33″W	Hope, Arkansas	
St. Luke's Episcopal Church (Auburn, California)		1877 founded		Auburn, California	
St. Mark's Episcopal Church (Berkeley, California)		1877 built	37°52′26.1″N 122°15′46.6″W	Berkeley, California	
St. Luke's Episcopal Church (Hot Springs, Arkansas)		1926 built 1982 NRHP-listed	Spring and Cottage Sts34°30′38″N 93°3′7″W	Hot Springs, Arkansas	
Trinity Episcopal Cathedral		1892 built 1976 NRHP-listed	310 W. 17th St.34°43′59″N 92°16′35″W	Little Rock, Arkansas	Gothic Revival
Saint Andrew's Episcopal Church (Mammoth Spring, Arkansas)		1888 built 1986 NRHP-listed	AR 936°29′42″N 91°31′58″W	Mammoth Spring, Arkansas	
St. Mary's Episcopal Church (Monticello, Arkansas)		1906 built 1996 NRHP-listed	115 S. Main St.33°37′39″N 91°47′26″W	Monticello, Arkansas	
Trinity Episcopal Church (Pine Bluff, Arkansas)		1866 built 1974 NRHP-listed	703 W. 3rd Ave.34°13′40″N 92°0′36″W	Pine Bluff, Arkansas	
Trinity Episcopal Church (Searcy, Arkansas)		1902 built 1992 NRHP-listed	N. Elm and Market Sts.35°14′59″N 91°44′25″W	Searcy, Arkansas	
Grace Episcopal Church (Wynne, Arkansas)		1917 built 1992 NRHP-listed	614 E. Poplar St.35°13′40″N 90°47′12″W	Wynne, Arkansas	
St. Michael's Episcopal Church (Anaheim, California)		1876 built 2004 NRHP-listed	311 West South St.33°49′36″N 117°54′47″W	Anaheim, California	
Episcopal Church of the Good Shepherd (Berkeley, California)		1878 built 1986 NRHP-listed	1001 Hearst St. 37°52′13″N 122°17′37″W	Berkeley, California	Carpenter Gothic
Grace Episcopal Church (Boulder Creek, California)		1906 built 2006 NRHP-listed	12547 CA 937°7′0″N 122°7′11″W	Boulder Creek, California	Now the San Lorenzo Valley Museum
St. John's Episcopal Church (Chico, California)		1905 built 1982 NRHP-listed	230 Salem St.39°43′44″N 121°50′25″W	Chico, California	
St. John's Episcopal Church (Los Angeles, California)		1925 built 2000 NRHP-listed	514 W. Adams Blvd34°1′38″N 118°16′29″W	Los Angeles, California	Founded 1890. Romanesque Revival.
St. Matthew's Episcopal Church (National City, California)		1887 built 1973 NRHP-listed	521 E. 8th St.32°40′40″N 117°6′2″W	National City, California	
All Saints Episcopal Church		1923-24 built	34°8′53″N 118°8′34″W	Pasadena, California	Notable for its activism, and, relatedly, for questioning by the U.S. taxing authority of its tax-exempt status
Episcopal Church of Our Saviour (Placerville, California)		1865 built 1977 NRHP-listed	2979 Coloma Street38°43′48″N 120°48′08″W	Placerville, California	
Episcopal Church of the Ascension (Sierra Madre, California)		1888 built 1977 NRHP-listed	25 E. Laurel Ave.34°9′58.05″N 118°3′3.9″W	Sierra Madre, California	
St. Thomas Episcopal Church (Alamosa, Colorado)		1926 built 2003 NRHP-listed	607 Fourth St.37°28′10″N 105°51′57″W	Alamosa, Colorado	Mission Revival
Grace Episcopal Church (Buena Vista, Colorado)		1889 built 1978 NRHP-listed	203 W. Main St.38°50′27″N 106°7′57″W	Buena Vista, Colorado	
Christ Episcopal Church		1902 built NRHP-listed	38°26′41″N 105°14′16″W	Canon City, Colorado	Designed by Scottish-born architect Thomas MacLaren
St. George's Anglican Church		1874 built	217 E. Pikes Peak Ave; 38°50′00.4″N 104°49′13.1″W	Colorado Springs, Colorado	Originally "Grace Episcopal Church"; later a restaurant; became Anglican church in 2011
All Saints Episcopal Church		1890 built 1978 NRHP-listed	39°45′43″N 105°0′49″W	Denver, Colorado	
St. Andrews Episcopal Church (Denver, Colorado)		1909 built 1975 NRHP-listed	2015 Glenarm Place39°44′53″N 104°59′5″W	Denver, Colorado	Ralph Adams Cram-designed
Grace Episcopal Church (Georgetown, Colorado)		1870 built 1973 NRHP-listed	Taos St.39°42′19″N 105°41′46″W	Georgetown, Colorado	
Calvary Episcopal Church		1867 built 1995 NRHP-listed	1300 Arapahoe Street; 39.7537°N 105.2217°W	Golden, Colorado	Oldest continuously used Episcopal church in Colorado. Pews donated by Coors family.
St. Stephen's Episcopal Church, 1881 (Longmont, Colorado)		1881 built 1975 NRHP-listed	470 Main Street40°10′3″N 105°6′6″W	Longmont, Colorado	
St. James Episcopal Church (Meeker, Colorado)		1890 built 1978 NRHP-listed	368 4th St.40°02′19″N 107°54′37″W	Meeker, Colorado	
St. John's Episcopal Church (Bridgeport, Connecticut)		1875 built 1984 NRHP-listed	768 Fairfield Ave.41°10′31″N 73°11′59″W	Bridgeport, Connecticut	
St. John's Episcopal Church (East Hartford, Connecticut)		1867 built 1983 NRHP-listed	1160 Main St.41°46′25″N 72°38′27″W	East Hartford, Connecticut	
St. Peter's Episcopal Church (Milford, Connecticut)		1850 built 1979 NRHP-listed	61, 71, 81 River St.41°13′27″N 73°3′27″W	Milford, Connecticut	Frank Wills-designed.
St. Luke's Episcopal Church (New Haven, Connecticut)		built 2003 NRHP-listed	111 Whalley Ave.41°18′51″N 72°56′9″W	New Haven, Connecticut	
St. James' Episcopal Church (New London, Connecticut)		1847-50 built 2009 NRHP-listed		Stamford, Connecticut	
Christ Episcopal Church and Tashua Burial Ground		2001 NRHP-listed	5170 Madison Ave. 41°17′12″N 73°15′38″W	Trumbull, Connecticut	
St. John's Episcopal Church (Warehouse Point, Connecticut)		1804 built 1982 NRHP-listed	92 Main St.41°55′43″N 72°37′6″W	Warehouse Point, Connecticut	
St. Andrew's Episcopal Church (Washington, Connecticut)		1822 built 1994 NRHP-listed	247 New Milford Turnpike41°39′46″N 73°22′10″W	Washington, Connecticut	
St. Paul's Episcopal Church (Georgetown, Delaware)		1844 built 1979 NRHP-listed	122 East Pine Street38°41′26″N 75°22′58″W	Georgetown, Delaware	
St. Thomas Episcopal Church (Newark, Delaware)		1845 built 1982 NRHP-listed	21 S. Main St.39.68210°N 75.75659°W	Newark, Delaware	Gothic Revival, by Richard Upjohn
All Saints' Episcopal Church		1893 built 1991 NRHP-listed	18 Olive Ave., Lewes and Rehoboth Hundred38°43′7″N 75°4′42″W	Rehoboth Beach, Delaware	Bungalow/Craftsman
St. Luke's Protestant Episcopal Church (Seaford, Delaware)		1843 built 1977 NRHP-listed	Front St.38°38′37″N 75°36′33″W	Seaford, Delaware	
Trinity Episcopal Church (Wilmington, Delaware)		1890 built 1984 NRHP-listed	1108 N. Adams St.39.75031°N 75.55469°W	Wilmington, Delaware	
Trinity Episcopal Church (Apalachicola, Florida)		1839 built 1972 NRHP-listed	79 6th Street29°43′30″N 84°59′7″W	Trinity Episcopal Church (Apalachicola, Florida)	Greek Revival
Old St. Luke's Episcopal Church and Cemetery		built NRHP-listed		Courteney, Florida	
All Saint's Episcopal Church (Enterprise, Florida)		1883 built 1974 NRHP-listed	155 Clark Street; 28°52′10″N 81°16′10″W	Enterprise, Florida	Gothic Revival/Carpenter Gothic
Holy Trinity Episcopal Church (Fruitland Park, Florida)		built NRHP-listed		Fruitland Park, Florida	
St. Mark's Episcopal Church (Haines City, Florida)		built NRHP-listed		Haines City, Florida	
St. Margaret's Episcopal Church and Cemetery		built NRHP-listed		Hibernia, Florida	
St. Andrew's Episcopal Church (Jacksonville, Florida)		built NRHP-listed		Jacksonville, Florida	
St. George Episcopal Church (Jacksonville, Florida)		built NRHP-listed		Jacksonville, Florida	
St. Mary's Episcopal Church (Madison, Florida)		built NRHP-listed		Madison, Florida	
Trinity Episcopal Cathedral (Miami, Florida)		built NRHP-listed		Miami, Florida	
St. Mary's Episcopal Church and Rectory (Milton, Florida)		built NRHP-listed		Milton, Florida	
St. Mark's Episcopal Church (Palatka, Florida)		built NRHP-listed		Palatka, Florida	
Grace Episcopal Church and Guild Hall (Port Orange, Florida)		built NRHP-listed		Port Orange, Florida	
St. John's Episcopal Church (Tallahassee, Florida)		built NRHP-listed		Tallahassee, Florida	
Episcopal House of Prayer		built NRHP-listed		Tampa, Florida	
St. Andrews Episcopal Church (Tampa, Florida)		built NRHP-listed		Tampa, Florida	
St. Gabriel's Episcopal Church (Titusville, Florida)		built NRHP-listed		Titusville, Florida	
All Saints Episcopal Church (Winter Park, Florida)		1941 built 2000 NRHP-listed	338 E. Lyman Ave.28°35′40″N 81°20′55″W	Winter Park, Florida	
St. Paul's Episcopal Church (Augusta, Georgia)		built NRHP-listed		Augusta, Georgia	
St. James' Episcopal Church		1884 built 2019 NRHP-listed	302 and 308 West Ave.34°00′40″N 85°15′30″W	Cedartown, Georgia	The congregation was formed in 1878, and five years later began construction of its beautiful church, opened in 1884.
Trinity Episcopal Church (Columbus, Georgia)		built NRHP-listed		Columbus, Georgia	
St. George's Episcopal Church (Griffin, Georgia)		built NRHP-listed		Griffin, Georgia	
Christ Episcopal Church		1851 built 1971 NRHP-listed	582 Walnut Street32°50′18.5″N 83°37′35.2″W	Macon, Georgia	
Zion Episcopal Church (Talbotton, Georgia)		built NRHP-listed		Talbotton, Georgia	
St. John's Episcopal Church (American Falls, Idaho)		built 2007 NRHP-listed		American Falls, Idaho	NRHP-listed in Power County
St. Paul's Episcopal Church (Blackfoot, Idaho)		1891 built 1979 NRHP-listed	72 N. Shilling Ave.43°11′17″N 112°20′29″W	Blackfoot, Idaho	
Bruneau Episcopal Church		1911 built 1982 NRHP-listed	42°52′51″N 115°47′51″W	Bruneau, Idaho	Designed by Tourtellotte & Hummel
St. James' Episcopal Mission Church		1904 built 1993 NRHP-listed	Reynolds St.44°10′32″N 112°13′35″W	Dubois, Idaho	
St. Mary's Episcopal Church (Emmett, Idaho)		1886 built 1980 NRHP-listed	219 E. 1st St.43°52′28″N 116°29′51″W	Emmett, Idaho	
Ross Fork Episcopal Church		1904 built 1983 NRHP-listed	Mission Rd.43°11′23″N 112°20′38″W	Fort Hall, Idaho	
Trinity Episcopal Church (Gooding, Idaho)		built 1982 NRHP-listed		Gooding, Idaho	NRHP-listed in Gooding County
Emmanuel Episcopal Church (Hailey, Idaho)		1885 built 1977 NRHP-listed	101 2nd Ave., S.43°31′13″N 114°18′44″W	Hailey, Idaho	Gothic Revival
Mackay Episcopal Church		built NRHP-listed		Mackay, Idaho	
St. James Episcopal Church (Mountain Home, Idaho)		built 1977 NRHP-listed		Mountain Home, Idaho	NRHP-listed in Elmore County
St. Andrew's Episcopal Church (Mullan, Idaho)		built 1999 NRHP-listed	104 Hunter St.	Mullan, Idaho	NRHP-listed in Shoshone County
St. James Episcopal Church (Payette, Idaho)		built 1978 NRHP-listed		Payette, Idaho	NRHP-listed in Payette County
Trinity Episcopal Church (Pocatello, Idaho)		built NRHP-listed		Pocatello, Idaho	
Episcopal Church of the Redeemer (Salmon, Idaho)		built NRHP-listed		Salmon, Idaho	
St. Luke's Episcopal Church (Weiser, Idaho)		built 1978 NRHP-listed		Weiser, Idaho	NRHP-listed in Washington County
St. Anne's Episcopal Church (Anna, Illinois)		built NRHP-listed		Anna, Illinois	
The Episcopal Church of the Atonement and Parish House		built NRHP-listed		Chicago, Illinois	
Christ Episcopal Church		1884 built 1982 NRHP-listed	75 West Van Buren Street; 41°31′33″N 88°05′03″W	Joliet, Illinois	
St. James Episcopal Church (Lewistown, Illinois)		1865 built 1974 NRHP-listed	MacArthur and Broadway40°23′56″N 90°9′6″W--->	Lewistown, Illinois	
St. James Episcopal Church (McLeansboro, Illinois)		built NRHP-listed		McLeansboro, Illinois	
Christ Episcopal Church		1888 built 1980 NRHP-listed	611 E. Jackson St. 39°47′50″N 89°38′51″W	Springfield, Illinois	Richardsonian Romanesque
Trinity Episcopal Church (Wheaton, Illinois)		built NRHP-listed		Wheaton, Illinois	
St. John of the Cross Episcopal Church, Rectory and Cemetery		built NRHP-listed		Bristol, Indiana	
St. Luke's Episcopal Church (Cannelton, Indiana)		built NRHP-listed		Cannelton, Indiana	
Saint John's Episcopal Church (Crawfordsville, Indiana)		built NRHP-listed		Crawfordsville, Indiana	
Trinity Episcopal Church (Fort Wayne, Indiana)		built NRHP-listed		Fort Wayne, Indiana	
Christ Church Cathedral		1857 built NRHP-listed	131 Monument Circle39°46′9″N 86°9′27″W	Indianapolis, Indiana	Gothic Revival; William Tinsley, architect
St. John's Episcopal Church (Lafayette, Indiana)		built NRHP-listed		Lafayette, Indiana	
Cathedral of St. James		1894 built NRHP-listed	115 and 117 N. Lafayette Boulevard41°40′37″N 86°15′14″W	South Bend, Indiana	Gothic Revival; Austin & Parker, architect
Church of the Saviour Episcopal Church and David Henderson Statue		built NRHP-listed		Clermont, Iowa	
Trinity Episcopal Cathedral		1867–73 built NRHP-listed	121 W. 12th St.41°31′52″N 90°34′28″W	Davenport, Iowa	Gothic Revival; Edward Tuckerman Potter, architect
Cathedral Church of Saint Paul		1885 built NRHP-listed	815 High St.41°35′16.95″N 93°37′44.4″W	Des Moines, Iowa	Gothic Revival; Foster & Liebbe, architects
St. John's Episcopal Church (Dubuque, Iowa)		1875–78 built NRHP-listed	1410 Main St.42°30′21.78″N 90°40′10.51″W	Dubuque, Iowa	Gothic Revival; Henry Martyn Congdon, architect
St. Paul's Episcopal Church		1856 built NRHP-listed	206 6th Ave.41°35′55″N 90°54′46″W	Durant, Iowa	Italianate, Gothic Revival
St. Paul's Episcopal Church (Harlan, Iowa)		built NRHP-listed		Harlan, Iowa	
Trinity Episcopal Church		1871 built NRHP-listed	320 E. College St.41°39′33″N 91°31′49″W	Iowa City, Iowa	Gothic Revival; Richard Upjohn, architect
St. Matthew's by the Bridge Episcopal Church		1913 built NRHP-listed	Junction of Oak and Railroad Streets 41°39′33″N 91°31′49″W	Iowa Falls, Iowa	Tudor Revival; Robert Layton, architect
St. John's Episcopal Church (Keokuk, Iowa)		1884–88 built 1989 NRHP-listed	4th and Concert Sts.42°31′6″N 93°15′47″W	Keokuk, Iowa	Gothic Revival; Appleton & Stephenson, architects
St. George's Episcopal Church (Le Mars, Iowa)		built NRHP-listed		Le Mars, Iowa	
Trinity Memorial Episcopal Church		1896 built NRHP-listed	302 S. 7th Street42°09′47.7″N 95°47′18.6″W	Mapleton, Iowa	Gothic Revival; Edward S. Hammatt, architect. Now a museum.
St. Barnabas Episcopal Church		1869 built NRHP-listed	Chestnut St.40°31′54″N 91°25′6″W	Montrose, Iowa	Gothic Revival
Trinity Episcopal Church		1851–54 built NRHP-listed	411 E. 2nd St.41°25′24.71″N 91°2′32.65″W	Muscatine, Iowa	Gothic Revival; Frank Will, architect
St. Stephen's Episcopal Church		1881 built NRHP-listed	223 E. 4th St., N.41°42′4″N 93°03′0″W	Newton, Iowa	Carpenter Gothic
St. James Episcopal Church		1901 built NRHP-listed	1st Ave. and S. 3rd St.,41°17′39″N 92°38′29″W	Oskaloosa, Iowa	Late Gothic Revival; Frank E. Wetherell, architect
St. Thomas Episcopal Church		1892 built NRHP-listed	1200 Douglas St.42°30′11″N 96°24′23″W	Sioux City, Iowa	Romanesque Revival; John M. Poorbaugh, architect
St. John's Episcopal Church (Abilene, Kansas)		built NRHP-listed		Abilene, Kansas	
Trinity Episcopal Church (Atchison, Kansas)		built NRHP-listed		Atchison, Kansas	
St. John's Episcopal Church (Girard, Kansas)		built NRHP-listed		Girard, Kansas	
St. Thomas Episcopal Church (Beattyville, Kentucky)		built NRHP-listed		Beattyville, Kentucky	
Trinity Episcopal Church (Covington, Kentucky)		built NRHP-listed		Covington, Kentucky	
Church of the Advent, Episcopal (Cynthiana, Kentucky)		1855 built 1978 NRHP-listed		Cynthiana, Kentucky	
Trinity Episcopal Church (Danville, Kentucky)		built NRHP-listed		Danville, Kentucky	
Christ Episcopal Church		1850 built 1988 NRHP-listed	Poplar St.37°41′42″N 85°51′29″W	Elizabethtown, Kentucky	
Holy Trinity Episcopal Church (Georgetown, Kentucky)		built NRHP-listed		Georgetown, Kentucky	
St. Philips Episcopal Church (Harrodsburg, Kentucky)		1861 built 1978 NRHP-listed	Short and Chiles Sts.37°45′39″N 84°50′40″W	Harrodsburg, Kentucky	
St. Paul's Episcopal Church (Henderson, Kentucky)		1860 built 1978 NRHP-listed	338 Center St.37°50′13″N 87°35′25″W	Henderson, Kentucky	
Grace Episcopal Church (Hopkinsville, Kentucky)		1883 built 1982 NRHP-listed	216 East 6th St.36°51′59″N 87°29′10″W	Hopkinsville, Kentucky	
Christ Church Episcopal		1848 built 1976 NRHP-listed	166 Market St. 38°02′55″N 84°29′48″W	Lexington, Kentucky	
Episcopal Burying Ground and Chapel (Lexington, Kentucky)		1867 built 1976 NRHP-listed	251 E. 3rd St.38°02′49″N 84°29′21″W	Lexington, Kentucky	Carpenter Gothic chapel likely designed by John McMurtry.
Calvary Episcopal Church		1876 built 1978 NRHP-listed	38°14′35″N 85°45′31″W	Louisville, Kentucky	Gothic Revival
Immanuel Chapel Protestant Episcopal Church (Louisville, Kentucky)		built NRHP-listed		Louisville, Kentucky	
St. Mary's Episcopal Church (Middlesboro, Kentucky)		built NRHP-listed		Middlesboro, Kentucky	
St. Paul's Episcopal Church (Newport, Kentucky)		built NRHP-listed		Newport, Kentucky	
Trinity Episcopal Church (Owensboro, Kentucky)		built NRHP-listed		Owensboro, Kentucky	
Grace Episcopal Church (Paducah, Kentucky)		1873 built 1976 NRHP-listed	820 Broadway37°5′3″N 88°36′13″W	Paducah, Kentucky	
Saint James' Episcopal Church (Pewee Valley, Kentucky)		built NRHP-listed		Pewee Valley, Kentucky	
Episcopal Church of the Incarnation (Amite, Louisiana)		built NRHP-listed		Amite, Louisiana	
Christ Episcopal Church		built NRHP-listed		Bastrop, Louisiana	
St. James Episcopal Church (Baton Rouge, Louisiana)		built NRHP-listed		Baton Rouge, Louisiana	
Trinity Episcopal Church (Cheneyville, Louisiana)		built NRHP-listed		Cheneyville, Louisiana	
St. Andrew's Episcopal Church (Clinton, Louisiana)		built NRHP-listed		Clinton, Louisiana	
Christ Episcopal Church		built NRHP-listed		Covington, Louisiana	
All Saints Episcopal Church		1885 built 1983 NRHP-listed	Hall and Harrison streets30°26′55″N 93°26′12″W	DeQuincy, Louisiana	Carpenter Gothic
St. Mary's Episcopal Church (Franklin, Louisiana)		built NRHP-listed		Franklin, Louisiana	
Grace Memorial Episcopal Church (Hammond, Louisiana)		built NRHP-listed		Hammond, Louisiana	
St. Matthew's Episcopal Church (Houma, Louisiana)		built NRHP-listed		Houma, Louisiana	
St. Stephen's Episcopal Church (Innis, Louisiana)		built NRHP-listed		Innis, Louisiana	
Episcopal Church of the Good Shepherd (Lake Charles, Louisiana)		built NRHP-listed		Lake Charles, Louisiana	
St. John's Episcopal Church (Laurel Hill, Louisiana)		built NRHP-listed		Laurel Hill, Louisiana	
Christ Episcopal Church and Cemetery		built NRHP-listed		Napoleonville, Louisiana	
Episcopal Church of the Epiphany		built NRHP-listed		New Iberia, Louisiana	
St. David's Episcopal Church (Rayville, Louisiana)		built NRHP-listed		Rayville, Louisiana	
Grace Episcopal Church (St. Francisville, Louisiana)		built NRHP-listed		St. Francisville, Louisiana	
St. Mark's Episcopal Church (Shreveport, Louisiana)		built NRHP-listed		Shreveport, Louisiana	
St. John's Episcopal Church and Cemetery (Thibodaux, Louisiana)		built NRHP-listed		Thibodaux, Louisiana	
St. Mary's Episcopal Church (Weyanoke, Louisiana)		built NRHP-listed		Weyanoke, Louisiana	
St. Mark's Episcopal Church (Augusta, Maine)		built NRHP-listed		Augusta, Maine	
Saint Saviour's Episcopal Church and Rectory		built NRHP-listed		Bar Harbor, Maine	
St. Paul's Episcopal Church (Brunswick, Maine)		built NRHP-listed		Brunswick, Maine	
St. Anne's Episcopal Church (Calais, Maine)		built NRHP-listed		Calais, Maine	
St. Peter's By-The-Sea Protestant Episcopal Church		built NRHP-listed		Cape Neddick, Maine	
St. John's Anglican Church and Parsonage Site		1770 built 1978 NRHP-listed		Dresden, Maine	
St. John's Episcopal Church (Dresden Mills, Maine)		built NRHP-listed		Dresden Mills, Maine	
Christ Episcopal Church		built NRHP-listed		Gardiner, Maine	
Trinity Episcopal Church (Lewiston, Maine)		built NRHP-listed		Lewiston, Maine	
St. James Episcopal Church (Old Town, Maine)		built NRHP-listed		Old Town, Maine	
Grace Episcopal Church (Robbinston, Maine)		built NRHP-listed		Robbinston, Maine	
Saint Jude's Episcopal Church (Seal Harbor, Maine)		built NRHP-listed		Seal Harbor, Maine	
St. John's Protestant Episcopal Church (Baltimore, Maryland)		built NRHP-listed		Baltimore, Maryland	
St. Paul's Protestant Episcopal Church (Baltimore, Maryland)		built NRHP-listed		Baltimore, Maryland	
St. Mark's Episcopal Church-Lappans		built NRHP-listed		Boonsboro, Maryland	
Christ Episcopal Church and Cemetery		built NRHP-listed		Cambridge, Maryland	
Christ Episcopal Church		built NRHP-listed		Chaptico, Maryland	
St. Stephen's Episcopal Church (Earleville, Maryland)		built NRHP-listed		Earleville, Maryland	
St. Paul's Episcopal Church (Hillsboro, Maryland)		built NRHP-listed		Hillsboro, Maryland	
St. Mark's Episcopal Church (Kingston, Maryland)		built NRHP-listed		Kingston, Maryland	
Grace Episcopal Church (Mt. Vernon, Maryland)		built NRHP-listed		Mt. Vernon, Maryland	
St. Paul's by-the-sea Protestant Episcopal Church		built NRHP-listed		Ocean City, Maryland	
St. Paul's Episcopal Church (Point of Rocks, Maryland)		built NRHP-listed		Point of Rocks, Maryland	
St. Bartholomew's Episcopal Church (Quantico, Maryland)		built NRHP-listed		Quantico, Maryland	
St. Andrew's Episcopal Chapel (Sudlersville, Maryland)		built NRHP-listed		Sudlersville, Maryland	
Grace Episcopal Church Complex (Taylor's Island, Maryland)		built NRHP-listed		Taylor's Island, Maryland	
St. Paul's Protestant Episcopal Church (Tulls Corner, Maryland)		built NRHP-listed		Tulls Corner, Maryland	
St. George's Protestant Episcopal Church (Valley Lee, Maryland)		built NRHP-listed		Valley Lee, Maryland	
St. Mary's Episcopal Church (Woodlawn, Maryland)		1873 built 1985 NRHP-listed	5610 Dogwood Road39°18′47″N 76°43′16″W	Woodlawn, Baltimore County, Maryland	
St. Mary's Episcopal Church (Boston, Massachusetts)		built NRHP-listed		Boston, Massachusetts	
St. James Episcopal Church (Cambridge, Massachusetts)		built NRHP-listed		Cambridge, Massachusetts	
Saint John's Episcopal Church (Framingham, Massachusetts)		built NRHP-listed		Framingham, Massachusetts	
St. Luke's Episcopal Church (Lanesborough, Massachusetts)		built NRHP-listed		Lanesborough, Massachusetts	
Grace Episcopal Church (Lawrence, Massachusetts)		1851 built 1976 NRHP-listed	42°42′31″N 71°9′29″W	Lawrence, Massachusetts	Hammatt Billings, Ralph Adams Cram
Trinity Episcopal Church (Lenox, Massachusetts)		built NRHP-listed		Lenox, Massachusetts	
Grace Episcopal Church (Medford, Massachusetts)		1869 built 1972 NRHP-listed	160 High St.42°25′12.01″N 71°07′00.24″W	Medford, Massachusetts	Henry Hobson Richardson with a stained glass window by John LaFarge
Trinity Episcopal Church (Melrose, Massachusetts)		built NRHP-listed		Melrose, Massachusetts	
Christ Episcopal Church		built NRHP-listed		Waltham, Massachusetts	
Saint Michael and All Angels' Episcopal Church and Cambridge Township Cemetery		built NRHP-listed		Cambridge Township, Michigan	
Trinity Episcopal Church (Caro, Michigan)		built NRHP-listed		Caro, Michigan	
Saint Andrew's Memorial Episcopal Church		1894 built 1986 NRHP-listed	918 Ludington Mall42°21′20″N 83°4′24″W	Detroit, Michigan	Cram, Wentworth & Goodhue
St. John's Episcopal Church (Detroit)		built NRHP-listed		Detroit, Michigan	
St. Joseph's Episcopal Church (Detroit, Michigan)		1883 built 1982 NRHP-listed	5930 Woodward Avenue42°21′53″N 83°4′9″W	Detroit, Michigan	Romanesque Revival
Trinity Episcopal Church (Detroit)		built NRHP-listed		Detroit, Michigan	
St. James Episcopal Church (Grosse Ile, Michigan)		built NRHP-listed		Grosse Ile, Michigan	
Grace Episcopal Church (Jonesville, Michigan)		built NRHP-listed		Jonesville, Michigan	
St. John's Episcopal Church (Mount Pleasant, Michigan)		built NRHP-listed		Mount Pleasant, Michigan	
St. John's Episcopal Church (Saginaw, Michigan)		built NRHP-listed		Saginaw, Michigan	
All Saints' Episcopal Church		1873 built NRHP-listed	252 Grand St. 42°39′23″N 86°12′3″W	Saugatuck, Michigan	Gothic Revival
Saint James' Episcopal Church (Sault Ste. Marie, Michigan)		built NRHP-listed		Sault Ste. Marie, Michigan	
Gethsemane Episcopal Church		1879 built 2011 NRHP-listed	40 N. Hering St. 45°12′2.6″N 96°1′2″W	Appleton, Minnesota	Represents the westernmost expansion of the Episcopal Church in southern Minnesota under Bishop Henry Benjamin Whipple.
Episcopal Church of the Transfiguration (Belle Plaine, Minnesota)		1868 built 1980 NRHP-listed	201 N. Walnut St. 44°37′28.3″N 93°45′48.5″W	Belle Plaine, Minnesota	Noted for its atypical Stick style architecture.
Christ Episcopal Church		1879 built 1985 NRHP-listed	310 13th St. N. 45°18′57″N 95°35′57″W	Benson, Minnesota	Benson's oldest church, noted for its Carpenter Gothic architecture and association with Bishop Whipple's expansion program and the city's English and New Englander settlers.
Church of the Good Shepherd-Episcopal (Blue Earth, Minnesota)		built NRHP-listed	Moore and 8th Streets; 43°38′12″N 94°06′00″W	Blue Earth, Minnesota	Gothic Revival
Church of the Holy Comforter-Episcopal (Brownsville, Minnesota)		1869 built 1970 NRHP-listed	Main Street43°41′40″N 91°16′37″W	Brownsville, Minnesota	
Church of the Redeemer-Episcopal (Cannon Falls, Minnesota)		1867 built 1980 NRHP-listed	123 Third Street North44°30′28.9″N 92°54′15.9″W	Cannon Falls, Minnesota	
St. Mark's Episcopal Chapel (Corinna Township, Minnesota)		1871 built 1979 NRHP-listed	10536 108th St. NW; 45°18′38.8″N 94°6′23.4″W	Corinna Township, Minnesota	Well-preserved example of a board and batten Gothic Revival parish church.
Church of the Holy Cross-Episcopal (Dundas, Minnesota)		1868 built 1868 NRHP-listed	Second Street44°25′33″N 93°12′14″W	Dundas, Minnesota	Built to a Richard Upjohn design book plan; NRHP-listed in Rice County
Cathedral of Our Merciful Saviour		1862–1869 built NRHP-listed	515 Second Ave NW; 44°17′48″N 93°16′16″W	Faribault, Minnesota	Gothic Revival; James Renwick Jr., architect
Church of Our Savior-Episcopal		1903 built NRHP-listed	113 4th St., NE; 45°58′36″N 94°21′28″W	Little Falls, Minnesota	
Holy Trinity Episcopal Church (Luverne, Minnesota)		built NRHP-listed		Luverne, Minnesota	
Gethsemane Episcopal Church (Minneapolis, Minnesota)		built NRHP-listed		Minneapolis, Minnesota	
St. John the Divine Episcopal Church (Moorhead, Minnesota)		built NRHP-listed		Moorhead, Minnesota	
St. Cornelia's Episcopal Church		1889–91 built 1979 NRHP-listed	38378 Reservation Highway 10144°32′0″N 94°59′43″W	Morton, Minnesota	Gothic Revival
All Saints Episcopal Church		built NRHP-listed	Washington and 5th Sts. 44°27′19″N 93°9′29″W	Northfield, Minnesota	Gothic Revival
Trinity Episcopal Church		1871 built 1975 NRHP-listed	3 E. 4th St. 45°7′48″N 94°31′40″W	Litchfield, Minnesota	Superlative Carpenter Gothic church believed to have been designed by Richard Upjohn.
Trinity Chapel-Episcopal		1861 built 1982 NRHP-listed		Ottawa, Minnesota	NRHP-listed in Le Sueur County
Trinity Episcopal Church		1874 built 1984 NRHP-listed	805 St. Charles Ave. 43°58′11.3″N 92°3′58″W	St. Charles, Minnesota	Carpenter Gothic church significant for its well-preserved interior and exterior.
Church of the Holy Communion-Episcopal (St. Peter, Minnesota)		1869 built 1983 NRHP-listed	116 N. Minnesota Ave. 44°19′36″N 93°57′19″W	St. Peter, Minnesota	Late Gothic Revival
Trinity Episcopal Church		1859 built 1984 NRHP-listed	8110 W. Main St. 44°1′39.3″N 91°45′56.3″W	Stockton, Minnesota	Noted for its well-preserved Carpenter Gothic architecture and shared importance to a community established by American-born settlers but later dominated by German immigrants.
Grace Memorial Episcopal Church		1900 built 1982 NRHP-listed	205 E. 3rd St. 44°22′52.5″N 92°1′53.5″W	Wabasha, Minnesota	English Gothic-style landmark designed by architect Cass Gilbert.
Old St. Paul's Episcopal Church Rectory		built 1996 NRHP-listed	300 Main St.	Columbus, Mississippi	NRHP-listed in Lowndes County
Holy Innocents' Episcopal Church (Como, Mississippi)		built NRHP-listed		Como, Mississippi	
Saint John's Episcopal Church (Ocean Springs, Mississippi)		built NRHP-listed		Ocean Springs, Mississippi	
St. Peter's Episcopal Church (Oxford, Mississippi)		built NRHP-listed		Oxford, Mississippi	
Saint Mark's Episcopal Church (Raymond, Mississippi)		built NRHP-listed		Raymond, Mississippi	
Grace Episcopal Church (Rosedale, Mississippi)		built NRHP-listed		Rosedale, Mississippi	
Immanuel Episcopal Church (Winona, Mississippi)		built NRHP-listed		Winona, Mississippi	
Grace Episcopal Church (Chillicothe, Missouri)		1867 built 1980 NRHP-listed	421 Elm St.39.7915°N 93.5511°W	Chillicothe, Missouri	Pre-fab church assembled in 1867.
St. John's Episcopal Church (Eolia, Missouri)		built NRHP-listed		Eolia, Missouri	
St. Mary's Episcopal Church (Fayette, Missouri)		built NRHP-listed		Fayette, Missouri	
St. Peter's Episcopal Church (Harrisonville, Missouri)		built NRHP-listed		Harrisonville, Missouri	
Trinity Episcopal Church (Independence, Missouri)		built NRHP-listed		Independence, Missouri	
St. Paul's Episcopal Church (Ironton, Missouri)		built NRHP-listed		Ironton, Missouri	
St. Mary's Episcopal Church (Kansas City, Missouri)		built NRHP-listed		Kansas City, Missouri	
Trinity Episcopal Church (Kirksville, Missouri)		built NRHP-listed		Kirksville, Missouri	
Grace Episcopal Church (Kirkwood, Missouri)		built NRHP-listed		Kirkwood, Missouri	
Saint Paul's Episcopal Church (Lee's Summit, Missouri)		1884 built 1985 NRHP-listed	Fifth and S. Green Streets38°54′39″N 94°22′21″W	Lee's Summit, Missouri	Carpenter Gothic
St. Jude's Episcopal Church (Monroe City, Missouri)		built NRHP-listed		Monroe City, Missouri	
St. Oswald's Protestant Episcopal Church (Skidmore, Missouri)		built NRHP-listed		Skidmore, Missouri	
Christ Episcopal Church		built NRHP-listed		Springfield, Missouri	
St. Philip's Episcopal Church (Trenton, Missouri)		built NRHP-listed		Trenton, Missouri	
St. Mark's Episcopal Church (Anaconda, Montana)		built NRHP-listed		Anaconda, Montana	
St. Mark's Episcopal Church (Big Timber, Montana)		built NRHP-listed		Big Timber, Montana	
St. James Episcopal Church and Rectory (Bozeman, Montana)		built NRHP-listed		Bozeman, Montana	
St. Paul's Episcopal Church (Fort Benton, Montana)		built NRHP-listed		Fort Benton, Montana	
St. James Episcopal Church and Parish House (Lewistown, Montana)		built NRHP-listed		Lewistown, Montana	
Calvary Episcopal Church		1900 built 1986 NRHP-listed	9 N. Villard Ave.45°11′16″N 109°14′56″W	Red Lodge, Montana	
St. Philip's Episcopal Church (Rosebud, Montana)		built NRHP-listed		Rosebud, Montana	
Christ Episcopal Church and Rectory		1896 built 1987 NRHP-listed	304 S. Main St.45°27′13″N 112°11′45″W	Sheridan, Montana	
St. Stephen's Episcopal Church (Ashland, Nebraska)		built NRHP-listed		Ashland, Nebraska	
Christ Church Episcopal		built NRHP-listed		Beatrice, Nebraska	
Trinity Memorial Episcopal Church (Crete, Nebraska)		built NRHP-listed		Crete, Nebraska	
St. Mark's Episcopal Pro-Cathedral (Hastings, Nebraska)		1929 built 1987 NRHP-listed	4th and Burlington40°35′16″N 98°23′29″W	Hastings, Nebraska	
Saint Luke's Protestant Episcopal Church		built NRHP-listed		Kearney, Nebraska	
St. Peter's Episcopal Church (Neligh, Nebraska)		built NRHP-listed		Neligh, Nebraska	
St. Martin of Tours Episcopal Church (Omaha, Nebraska)		built NRHP-listed		Omaha, Nebraska	
St. Matthias' Episcopal Church (Omaha, Nebraska)		built NRHP-listed		Omaha, Nebraska	
Grace Protestant Episcopal Church (Red Cloud, Nebraska)		built NRHP-listed		Red Cloud, Nebraska	
Episcopal Church (Santee, Nebraska)		1884 built 1972 NRHP-listed	On the Mississippi River, in the Santee Indian Reservation42°50′27.06″N 97°50′15.47″W	Santee, Nebraska	
Christ Episcopal Church		built NRHP-listed		Sidney, Nebraska	
St. Paul's Memorial Episcopal Church and Guild Hall (Las Vegas, New Mexico)		built NRHP-listed		Las Vegas, New Mexico	
St. George's Episcopal Church (Austin, Nevada)		built NRHP-listed		Austin, Nevada	
St. Peter's Episcopal Church (Carson City, Nevada)		built NRHP-listed		Carson City, Nevada	
Holy Trinity Episcopal Church (Fallon, Nevada)		built NRHP-listed		Fallon, Nevada	
St. Mark's Episcopal Church (Ashland, New Hampshire)		built NRHP-listed		Ashland, New Hampshire	
St. Thomas Episcopal Church (Dover, New Hampshire)		built NRHP-listed		Dover, New Hampshire	
St. Bernard's Church and Parish House		1897 built 2006 NRHP-listed	40°43′20″N 74°34′21″W	Bernardsville, New Jersey	
St. Stephens Episcopal Church (Beverly City, New Jersey)		built NRHP-listed		Beverly City, New Jersey	
Saint Peter's-By-The-Sea Episcopal Church		1876 built 1995 NRHP-listed	38°56′3″N 74°58′0″W	Cape May Point, New Jersey	
St. Peter's Episcopal Church (Clarksboro, New Jersey)		built NRHP-listed		Clarksboro, New Jersey	
St. Peter's Episcopal Church (Freehold Borough, New Jersey)		built NRHP-listed		Freehold Borough, New Jersey	
St. Thomas Episcopal Church (Glassboro, New Jersey)		built NRHP-listed		Glassboro, New Jersey	
St. Luke's Episcopal Church (Hope, New Jersey)		built NRHP-listed		Hope, New Jersey	
St. John's Episcopal Church (Little Silver, New Jersey)		built NRHP-listed		Little Silver, New Jersey	
Christ Episcopal Church		built NRHP-listed		New Brunswick, New Jersey	
House of Prayer Episcopal Church and Rectory		built NRHP-listed		Newark, New Jersey	
St. Barnabas' Episcopal Church (Newark, New Jersey)		built NRHP-listed		Newark, New Jersey	
St. Peter's Episcopal Church (Perth Amboy, New Jersey)		built NRHP-listed		Perth Amboy, New Jersey	
St. Thomas Episcopal Church (Pittstown, New Jersey)		built NRHP-listed		Pittstown, New Jersey	
Grace Episcopal Church (Plainfield City, New Jersey)		built NRHP-listed		Plainfield City, New Jersey	
St. George's-by-the-River Episcopal Church		built NRHP-listed		Rumson, New Jersey	
St. John's Episcopal Church and Burying Ground		built NRHP-listed		Runnemede, New Jersey	
Christ Church Episcopal		built NRHP-listed		Shrewsbury, New Jersey	
Holy Trinity Episcopal Church (Spring Lake, New Jersey)		built NRHP-listed		Spring Lake, New Jersey	
St. Michael's Episcopal Church (Trenton, New Jersey)		built NRHP-listed		Trenton, New Jersey	
St. Mark's Episcopal Church (West Orange, New Jersey)		built NRHP-listed		West Orange, New Jersey	
Trinity Episcopal Church (Woodbridge Township, New Jersey)		built NRHP-listed		Woodbridge Township, New Jersey	
St. Andrew's Episcopal Church (Albany, New York)		built NRHP-listed		Albany, New York	
St. Thomas' Episcopal Church (Amenia Union, New York)		built NRHP-listed		Amenia Union, New York	
Trinity Episcopal Church (Ashland, New York)		built NRHP-listed		Ashland, Greene County, New York	
St. Peter's Episcopal Church Complex (Auburn, New York)		built NRHP-listed		Auburn, New York	
Saint James' Episcopal Church (Batavia, New York)		built NRHP-listed		Batavia, New York	
St. Luke's Episcopal Church Complex (Beacon, New York)		built NRHP-listed		Beacon, New York	
Christ Episcopal Church		built NRHP-listed		Belvidere, New York	
St. Peter's Episcopal Church (Bloomfield, New York)		built NRHP-listed		Bloomfield, New York	
St. Andrew's Episcopal Church (Brewster, New York)		built NRHP-listed		Brewster, New York	
All Saints' Episcopal Church		1848 built 2002 NRHP-listed	96 and 201 Scarborough Rd.41°8′41″N 73°50′36″W	Briarcliff Manor, New York	Gothic Revival, by Richard Upjohn and William Henry Deacy
St. Luke's Episcopal Church (Brockport, New York)		built NRHP-listed		Brockport, New York	
St. Andrew's Episcopal Church (Buffalo, New York)		built NRHP-listed		Buffalo, New York	
St. Paul's Episcopal Cathedral (Buffalo, New York)		built NRHP-listed		Buffalo, New York	
Trinity Episcopal Church (Buffalo, New York)		built NRHP-listed		Buffalo, New York	
St. John's Episcopal Church (Cape Vincent, New York)		built NRHP-listed		Cape Vincent, New York	
Saint Mark's Episcopal Church (Chelsea, New York)		1866 built 1987 NRHP-listed	Liberty St.41°33′7″N 73°58′5″W	Chelsea, New York	
Trinity Episcopal Church (Claverack, New York)		built NRHP-listed		Claverack, New York	
Zion Episcopal Church and Rectory		built NRHP-listed		Colton, New York	
St. Augustine's Episcopal Church Complex (Croton-on-Hudson, New York)		built NRHP-listed		Croton-on-Hudson, New York	
Christ Episcopal Church		built NRHP-listed		Duanesburg, New York	
Trinity Episcopal Church-Fairfield		built NRHP-listed		Fairfield, New York	
St. James Episcopal Church (Fort Edward, New York)		built NRHP-listed		Fort Edward, New York	
St. Mark's Episcopal Church (Fort Montgomery, New York)		built NRHP-listed		Fort Montgomery, New York	
St. Mark's Episcopal Church (Green Island, New York)		built NRHP-listed		Green Island, New York	
Rectory of St. George's Episcopal Church (Hempstead, New York)		built NRHP-listed		Hempstead, New York	
St. Peter's Episcopal Church Complex (Hobart, New York)		built NRHP-listed		Hobart, New York	
St. John's Episcopal Church (Honeoye Falls, New York)		built NRHP-listed		Honeoye Falls, New York	
St. Mark's Episcopal Church (Hoosick Falls, New York)		built NRHP-listed		Hoosick Falls, New York	
St. Luke's Episcopal Church (Jerusalem, New York)		built NRHP-listed		Jerusalem, New York	
St. John's Episcopal Church (Johnstown, New York)		built NRHP-listed		Johnstown, New York	
St. Luke's Episcopal Church (Katonah, Town of Bedford, New York)		built NRHP-listed		Katonah, Town of Bedford, New York	
Emmanuel Episcopal Church (Little Falls, New York)		1835 built 2009 NRHP-listed	588 Albany St.43°02′39.23″N 74°51′19.41″W	Little Falls, New York	Italianate
Grace Episcopal Church Complex (Lyons, New York)		built NRHP-listed		Lyons, New York	
St. Thomas' Episcopal Church Complex (Mamaroneck, New York)		built NRHP-listed		St. Thomas' Episcopal Church Complex (Mamaroneck, New York)	
St. John's Episcopal Church and Rectory (Monticello, New York)		built NRHP-listed		Monticello, New York	
Trinity Episcopal Chapel (Morley, New York)		built NRHP-listed		Morley, New York	
Zion Episcopal Church Complex and Harmony Cemetery		built NRHP-listed		Morris, New York	
St. Mark's Episcopal Church (Mt. Kisco, New York)		built NRHP-listed		Mt. Kisco, New York	
St. John's Episcopal Church (Mount Morris, New York)		built NRHP-listed		Mount Morris, New York	
Trinity Episcopal Church Complex (Mount Vernon, New York)		built NRHP-listed		Mount Vernon, New York	
Grace Episcopal Church (Bronx, New York)		built NRHP-listed		Bronx, New York	
Church of the Ascension, Episcopal (Manhattan)		1840–41 built 1987 NRHP-listed; 1987 NHL	36–38 Fifth Avenue40°44′01.3″N 73°59′46.2″W	New York, New York	Richard Upjohn-designed Gothic Revival; a National Historic Landmark
Grace Episcopal Church Complex (New York, New York)		built NRHP-listed		New York, New York	
Holy Trinity Church-Protestant Episcopal (New York, New York)		built NRHP-listed		New York, New York	
St. Alban's Episcopal Church (New York, New York)		built NRHP-listed		New York, New York	
St. Andrew's Episcopal Church (New York, New York)		built NRHP-listed		New York, New York	
St. Bartholomew's Protestant Episcopal Church and Rectory (New York, New York)		built NRHP-listed		New York, New York	
St. George's Episcopal Church (Manhattan)		built NRHP-listed		New York, New York	
St. George's Protestant Episcopal Church (Brooklyn)		built NRHP-listed		New York, New York	
St. Ignatius of Antioch Episcopal Church (New York, New York)		built NRHP-listed		New York, New York	
St. James' Episcopal Church and Parish House (New York, New York)		built NRHP-listed		New York, New York	
St. Luke's Protestant Episcopal Church (New York, New York)		built NRHP-listed		New York, New York	
St. Mary's Episcopal Church (New York, New York)		built NRHP-listed		New York, New York	
St. Paul's Protestant Episcopal Church (New York, New York)		built NRHP-listed		New York, New York	
Christ Church Episcopal		built NRHP-listed		Staten Island, New York	
Church of St. Andrew (Episcopal)		built NRHP-listed		Staten Island, New York	
Trinity-St. Paul's Episcopal Church (New Rochelle, New York)		built NRHP-listed		New Rochelle, New York	
St. Thomas Episcopal Church (New Windsor, New York)		built NRHP-listed		New Windsor, New York	
Emmanuel Episcopal Church Complex (Norwich, New York)		1874 built 2009 NRHP-listed	37 W. Main St.42°31′49.72″N 75°31′38.14″W	Norwich, New York	
St. Johns Episcopal Church and Cemetery (Oakdale, New York)		built NRHP-listed		Oakdale, New York	
St. Stephen's Episcopal Church Complex (Olean, New York)		built NRHP-listed		Olean, New York	
St. Paul's Episcopal (Orleans, New York)		built NRHP-listed		Orleans, New York	
St. Paul's Episcopal Church and Rectory (Ossining, New York)		built NRHP-listed		Ossining, New York	
Zion Episcopal Church (Palmyra, New York)		1872 built 1996 NRHP-listed	100-120 Main St.43°3′47″N 77°14′0″W	Palmyra, New York	
St. Paul's Episcopal Church Complex (Patchogue, New York)		built NRHP-listed		Patchogue, New York	
St. Peter's Episcopal Church (Peekskill, New York)		built NRHP-listed		Peekskill, New York	
St. John's Episcopal Church (Phelps, New York)		built NRHP-listed		St. John's Episcopal Church (Phelps, New York)	
St. John's Episcopal Church (Phoenix, New York)		built NRHP-listed		Phoenix, New York	
St. Peter's Episcopal Church (Port Chester, New York)		built NRHP-listed		Port Chester, New York	
Trinity Episcopal Church (Potsdam, New York)		built NRHP-listed		Potsdam, New York	
St. Paul's Episcopal Church (Poughkeepsie, New York)		built NRHP-listed		Poughkeepsie, New York	
Old Episcopal Manse (Prattsville, New York)		built NRHP-listed		Prattsville, New York	
Saint Andrew's Episcopal Church (Rochester, New York)		built NRHP-listed		Rochester, New York	
Saint Mark's and Saint John's Episcopal Church		built NRHP-listed		Rochester, New York	
Trinity Episcopal Church Complex (Saugerties, New York)		built NRHP-listed		Saugerties, New York	
St. Stephen's Episcopal Church (Schuylerville, New York)		built NRHP-listed		Schuylerville, New York	
St. Luke's Protestant Episcopal Church (Sea Cliff, New York)		built NRHP-listed		Sea Cliff, New York	
St. Thomas' Episcopal Church (Slaterville Springs, New York)		built NRHP-listed		Slaterville Springs, New York	
St. John's Episcopal (Speedsville, New York)		built NRHP-listed		Speedsville, New York	
St. Paul's Episcopal Church (Spring Valley, New York)		built NRHP-listed		Spring Valley, New York	
Grace Episcopal Church (Syracuse, New York)		1876 built 1973 NRHP-listed	819 Madison Avenue43°2′44.08″N 76°8′5.17″W	Syracuse, New York	Gothic Revival, designed by Horatio Nelson White
Christ Episcopal Church		built NRHP-listed		Tarrytown, New York	
St. Paul's Episcopal Church Complex (Troy, New York)		built NRHP-listed		Troy, New York	NRHP-listed in Rensselaer County
St. Mary's-in-Tuxedo		1888 built	41°11′47″N 74°11′11″W	Tuxedo, New York	Shingle Style; William A. Potter, architect.
Calvary Episcopal Church (former)		built NRHP-listed		Utica, New York	
St. Andrew's Episcopal Church & Rectory (Walden, New York)		1871 built 2008 NRHP-listed	41°33′36″N 74°11′24″W	Walden, New York	Charles Babcock
Christ Episcopal Church		built NRHP-listed		Walton, New York	
Saint Paul's Episcopal Church (Watertown, New York)		built NRHP-listed		Watertown, New York	
Trinity Episcopal Church and Parish House (Watertown, New York)		built NRHP-listed		Watertown, New York	
Grace Episcopal Church (Waverly, New York)		1854 built 2000 NRHP-listed	445 Park Ave42°0′13″N 76°32′22″W	Waverly, New York	
Christ Episcopal Church		built NRHP-listed		Wellsburg, New York	
Grace Episcopal Church (Whitney Point, New York)		built NRHP-listed		Whitney Point, New York	
St. Matthew's Episcopal Church (Woodhaven, New York)		built NRHP-listed		Woodhaven, New York	
St. Andrew's Episcopal Church (Yaphank, New York)		built NRHP-listed		Yaphank, New York	
St. John's Protestant Episcopal Church (Yonkers, New York)		built NRHP-listed		Yonkers, New York	
St. John's Episcopal Church (Youngstown, New York)		built NRHP-listed		Youngstown, New York	
All Souls Episcopal Church and Parish House		built 1896; NRHP-listed	2 Angle St.35°33′55″N 82°32′34″W	Asheville, North Carolina	Richard Morris Hunt, architect
St. Luke's Episcopal Church		built 1894; NRHP-listed	219 Chunn's Cove Rd.35°36′7″N 82°31′53″W	Asheville, North Carolina	Carpenter Gothic; E. J. Armstrong, architect
St. Mary's Episcopal Church		built 1914; NRHP-listed	337 Charlotte St.35°36′39.47″N 82°32′42.13″W	Asheville, North Carolina	Gothic Revival; Richard S. Smith and Chauncey Beadle, architects
St. Matthias Episcopal Church		built NRHP-listed	Valley St.35°35′30″N 82°32′54″W	Asheville, North Carolina	Gothic Revival
St. Matthias Episcopal Church (Asheville, North Carolina)		built NRHP-listed		Asheville, North Carolina	
St. Luke's Episcopal Church (Asheville, North Carolina)		built NRHP-listed		Asheville, North Carolina	
St. Thomas Episcopal Church (Bath, North Carolina)		built NRHP-listed		Bath, North Carolina	
St. John's Episcopal Church (Battleboro, North Carolina)		built NRHP-listed		Battleboro, North Carolina	
St. Philip's Episcopal Church (Brevard, North Carolina)		built NRHP-listed		Brevard, North Carolina	
St. Athanasius Episcopal Church and Parish House and the Church of the Holy Comforter		built NRHP-listed		Burlington, North Carolina	
St. Luke's Episcopal Church (Eden, North Carolina)		built NRHP-listed		Eden, North Carolina	
St. Paul's Episcopal Church		1760 built 1975 NRHP-listed	100 West Church Street36°03′40.6″N 76°36′31.8″W	Edenton, North Carolina	
Episcopal Cemetery (Elizabeth City, North Carolina)		built NRHP-listed		Elizabeth City, North Carolina	
St. John's Episcopal Church (Fayetteville, North Carolina)		built NRHP-listed		Fayetteville, North Carolina	
St. Joseph's Episcopal Church (Fayetteville, North Carolina)		built NRHP-listed		Fayetteville, North Carolina	
St. Philip's Episcopal Church (Germanton, North Carolina)		1894 built 1982 NRHP-listed	Removed36°15′35″N 80°14′11″W	Germanton, North Carolina	
St. Mark's Episcopal Church (Halifax, North Carolina)		1855 built 1998 NRHP-listed	204 S. King St.36°19′34″N 77°35′31″W	Halifax, North Carolina	
St. Matthew's Episcopal Church and Churchyard		1826 built 1971 NRHP-listed	St. Mary's Rd.36°4′35″N 79°5′43″W	Hillsborough, North Carolina	
St. Mark's Episcopal Church (Huntersville, North Carolina)		1886, 1897 built 1984 NRHP-listed	SR 200435°20′52″N 80°52′51″W	Huntersville, North Carolina	
St. James Episcopal Church and Rectory (Kittrell, North Carolina)		1872 built 1978 NRHP-listed	SR 1551 and SR 155536°13′22″N 78°26′25″W	Kittrell, North Carolina	
Grace Episcopal Church (Lexington, North Carolina)		1902 built 2006 NRHP-listed	419 S. Main St.35°49′13″N 80°15′26″W	Lexington, North Carolina	
St. John's Episcopal Church (Marion, North Carolina)		1883 built 1991 NRHP-listed	315 S. Main St.35°40′48″N 82°0′25″W	Marion, North Carolina	Carpenter Gothic
Trinity Episcopal Church (Mount Airy, North Carolina)		1896 built 1986 NRHP-listed	472 N. Main St.36°30′11″N 80°36′24″W	Mount Airy, North Carolina	Gothic Revival
Christ Episcopal Church and Parish House		1824 built 1973 NRHP-listed	320 Pollock St.35°6′25″N 77°2′23″W	New Bern, North Carolina	
Christ Episcopal Church		built NRHP-listed		Raleigh, North Carolina	
St. John's Episcopal Church (St. John's, North Carolina)		1895 built 1986 NRHP-listed	SR 1917 and SR 175335°22′24″N 77°21′36″W	St. John's, North Carolina	
St. Barnabas Episcopal Church (Snow Hill, North Carolina)		1887 built 1979 NRHP-listed	St. Barnabas Rd.35°27′5″N 77°40′15″W--->	Snow Hill, North Carolina	Gothic Revival
Calvary Episcopal Church and Churchyard		1860-67 built 1971 NRHP-listed	411 E. Church St.35°53′51″N 77°31′56″W	Tarboro, North Carolina	
Grace Episcopal Church (Trenton, North Carolina)		1885 built 1972 NRHP-listed	Lake View Dr. and Weber St.35°3′43″N 77°21′14″W	Trenton, North Carolina	Carpenter Gothic
Valle Crucis Episcopal Mission		1896 built 1993 NRHP-listed	NC 19436°11′45″N 81°47′46″W	Valle Crucis, North Carolina vic.	
Christ Episcopal Church		1886-87 built 2005 NRHP-listed	412 Summit Ave.36°17′59″N 80°8′22″W	Walnut Cove, North Carolina	
Zion Episcopal Church (Washington, North Carolina)		built NRHP-listed		Washington, North Carolina	
Grace Episcopal Church (Weldon, North Carolina)		built NRHP-listed		Weldon, North Carolina	
St. Paul's Episcopal Church and Cemetery (Wilkesboro, North Carolina)		built NRHP-listed		Wilkesboro, North Carolina	
St. John's Episcopal Church (Williamsboro, North Carolina)		built NRHP-listed		Williamsboro, North Carolina	
St. Andrew's Episcopal Church and Cemetery (Woodleaf, North Carolina)		built NRHP-listed		Woodleaf, North Carolina	
St. Stephen's Episcopal Church (Casselton, North Dakota)		built NRHP-listed		Casselton, North Dakota	
Episcopal Church of the Advent and Guild Hall		1886 built 2002 NRHP-listed	501 6th St. E.48°06′51″N 98°51′29″W	Devil's Lake, North Dakota	
Grace Episcopal Church (Jamestown, North Dakota)		built NRHP-listed		Jamestown, North Dakota	
St. Alban's Episcopal Church (Lidgerwood, North Dakota)		built NRHP-listed		Lidgerwood, North Dakota	
Grace Episcopal Church (Minnewaukan, North Dakota)		built NRHP-listed		Minnewaukan, North Dakota	
Grace Episcopal Church (Pembina, North Dakota)		built NRHP-listed		Pembina, North Dakota	
St. Paul's Episcopal Church (Rugby, North Dakota)		built NRHP-listed		Rugby, North Dakota	
All Saints' Episcopal Church		1881 built 1992 NRHP-listed	516 N. Central Ave.46°55′41.82″N 98°0′5.17″W	Valley City, North Dakota	Gothic Revival; first stone Episcopal church in North Dakota
St. James Episcopal Church (Boardman, Ohio)		built NRHP-listed		Boardman, Ohio	
Calvary Episcopal Church (Cincinnati)		1866-67 built	3766 Clifton Avenue39°9′8″N 84°31′3.08″W	Cincinnati, Ohio	Its Calvary Episcopal Church Sunday School was NRHP-listed in 1980
Episcopal Church of the Resurrection (Cincinnati, Ohio)		built NRHP-listed		Cincinnati, Ohio	
Saint Philip's Episcopal Church (Circleville, Ohio)		1866 built 1986 NRHP-listed	129 W. Mound St.39°35′59″N 82°56′50″W--->	Circleville, Ohio	
St. John's Episcopal Church (Cleveland, Ohio)		built NRHP-listed		Cleveland, Ohio	
St. Paul's Episcopal Church (Cleveland, Ohio)		built NRHP-listed		Cleveland, Ohio	
Saint Paul's Episcopal Church (Columbus, Ohio)		built NRHP-listed		Columbus, Ohio	
Trinity Episcopal Church (Columbus, Ohio)		built NRHP-listed		Columbus, Ohio	
St. Paul's Episcopal Church of East Cleveland		built NRHP-listed		East Cleveland, Ohio	
St. Andrew's Episcopal Church (Elyria, Ohio)		built NRHP-listed		Elyria, Ohio	
St. Paul's Episcopal Church (Fremont, Ohio)		built NRHP-listed		Fremont, Ohio	
St. Paul's Episcopal Church (Hicksville, Ohio)		built NRHP-listed		Hicksville, Ohio	
Grace Episcopal Church (Galion, Ohio)		1866 built 1980 NRHP-listed	40°43′59″N 82°47′28″W	Galion, Ohio	The Brownella Cottage and Grace Episcopal Church and Rectory complex was together NRHP-listed in 1980.
St. Luke's Episcopal Church (Granville, Ohio)		built NRHP-listed		Granville, Ohio	
Saint Mary's Episcopal Church and Parish House		built NRHP-listed		Hillsboro, Ohio	
Christ Episcopal Church		built NRHP-listed		Huron, Ohio	
St. Timothy's Protestant Episcopal Church (Massillon, Ohio)		built NRHP-listed		Massillon, Ohio	
Trinity Episcopal Church (McArthur, Ohio)		built NRHP-listed		McArthur, Ohio	
St. Paul's Episcopal Church (Medina, Ohio)		built NRHP-listed		Medina, Ohio	
Zion Episcopal Church (Monroeville, Ohio)		1861 built 1974 NRHP-listed	Ridge St. at Monroe St.41°14′34.5″N 82°42′13″W	Monroeville, Ohio	
Christ Episcopal Church		built NRHP-listed		Oberlin, Ohio	
St. James Episcopal Church (Painesville, Ohio)		built NRHP-listed		Painesville, Ohio	
St. Thomas Episcopal Church (Port Clinton, Ohio)		built NRHP-listed		Port Clinton, Ohio	
All Saints Episcopal Church		1833 built 1982 NRHP-listed	4th and Court Sts.38°43′58″N 83°0′1″W	Portsmouth, Ohio	Gothic Revival
Grace Episcopal Church (Sandusky, Ohio)		built NRHP-listed		Sandusky, Ohio	
Trinity Episcopal Church (Toledo, Ohio)		built NRHP-listed		Toledo, Ohio	
St. Mark's Episcopal Church (Wadsworth, Ohio)		built NRHP-listed		Wadsworth, Ohio	
Windsor Mills Christ Church Episcopal		1832 built 1975 NRHP-listed	Wisell Rd. and U.S. Route 32241°32′9″N 80°57′43″W	Windsor Township, Ashtabula County, Ohio	Greek Revival
Episcopal Church of the Ascension and Manse (Wellsville, Ohio)		built NRHP-listed		Wellsville, Ohio	
St. John's Episcopal Church (Worthington, Ohio)		built NRHP-listed		Worthington, Ohio	
St. James Episcopal Church (Zanesville, Ohio)		built NRHP-listed		Zanesville, Ohio	
St. Stephen's Episcopal Church (Chandler, Oklahoma)		built NRHP-listed		Chandler, Oklahoma	
St James Episcopal Church (Wagoner, Oklahoma)		built NRHP-listed		Wagoner, Oklahoma	
Trinity Episcopal Church (Ashland, Oregon)		built NRHP-listed		Ashland, Oregon	
Grace Episcopal Church and Rectory (Astoria, Oregon)		built NRHP-listed		Astoria, Oregon	
Old Grace Episcopal Church Rectory (Astoria, Oregon)		built NRHP-listed		Astoria, Oregon	
Trinity Episcopal Church (Bend, Oregon)		built NRHP-listed		Bend, Oregon	
St. Thomas' Episcopal Church (Canyon City, Oregon)		built NRHP-listed		Canyon City, Oregon	
St. James Episcopal Church (Coquille, Oregon)		built NRHP-listed		Coquille, Oregon	
Ascension Episcopal Church and Rectory		built NRHP-listed		Cove, Oregon	
Episcopal Church of the Good Samaritan		built NRHP-listed		Corvallis, Oregon	
Bishopcroft of the Episcopal Diocese of Oregon		1911 built 2000 NRHP-listed	1832 SW Elm Street45.5095°N 122.6978°W	Portland, Oregon	NRHP-listed in S or SW Portland, Oregon
St. John's Episcopal Church (Portland, Oregon)		built NRHP-listed		Portland, Oregon	
St. John's Episcopal Church (Toledo, Oregon)		built NRHP-listed		Toledo, Oregon	
Cathedral Church of the Nativity		1887 built 1988 NRHP-listed	321 Wyandotte St.40°36′41.12″N 75°23′01″W	Bethlehem, Pennsylvania	A contributing property in the Fountain Hill Historic District; Gothic Revival
St. Michael's Protestant Episcopal Church, Parish House and Rectory		built NRHP-listed		Birdsboro, Pennsylvania	
St. Peter's Episcopal Church and Rectory (Blairsville, Pennsylvania)		built NRHP-listed		Blairsville, Pennsylvania	
St. Paul's Church		1900 built		Chester, Pennsylvania	Incorporated in 1702, 3 churches have been built - the first in 1702, second in 1859 and current in 1900. architect William Provost Jr.
St. John's Church		1844 built		Concord, Pennsylvania	Incorporated in 1702, additions were made in 1773, 1790 and 1837. The current church was built in 1844
Bangor Episcopal Church		1830 built 1987 NRHP-listed	Northwestern corner of Main and Water Streets, Churchtown40°8′1″N 75°57′42″W	Blue Ball, Pennsylvania	In Churchtown, Caernarvon Township. Greek Revival, Gothic Revival.
Old St. Gabriel's Episcopal Church (Douglassville, Pennsylvania)		built NRHP-listed		Douglassville, Pennsylvania	
St. Paul's Episcopal Church (Elkins Park, Pennsylvania)		built NRHP-listed		Elkins Park, Pennsylvania	
St. Mary's Episcopal Church (Elverson, Pennsylvania)		built NRHP-listed		Elverson, Pennsylvania	
St. Mark's Episcopal Church (Jim Thorpe, Pennsylvania)		built NRHP-listed		Jim Thorpe, Pennsylvania	
St. Luke's Episcopal Church (Lebanon, Pennsylvania)		built NRHP-listed		Lebanon, Pennsylvania	
St. Martin's Church		1845 built		Marcus Hook, Pennsylvania	Incorporated in 1699, 3 churches have been built on this property - the first in 1702, second in 1745 and current in 1845
St. James Episcopal Church (Muncy, Pennsylvania)		built NRHP-listed		Muncy, Pennsylvania	
Philadelphia Episcopal Cathedral		1855 built 1979 NRHP-listed	3723–3725 Chestnut St.39°57′20″N 75°11′54″W	Philadelphia, Pennsylvania	Italian Romanesque
St. Mark's Episcopal Church (Philadelphia, Pennsylvania)		built NRHP-listed		Philadelphia, Pennsylvania	
Christ Church, Philadelphia		1727-44 built 1970 NRHP listed		Philadelphia, Pennsylvania	Founded in 1695. Georgian architectural style
Trinity Church, Oxford		1711 built		Philadelphia, Pennsylvania	Founded in 1698.
Protestant Episcopal Church of the Saviour (Philadelphia, Pennsylvania)		built NRHP-listed		Philadelphia, Pennsylvania	
Emmanuel Episcopal Church (Pittsburgh, Pennsylvania)		built NRHP-listed		Pittsburgh, Pennsylvania	
George W. South Memorial Protestant Episcopal Church of the Advocate		built NRHP-listed		Philadelphia, Pennsylvania	
St. Clement's Protestant Episcopal Church (Philadelphia, Pennsylvania)		built NRHP-listed		Philadelphia, Pennsylvania	
St. Peter's Episcopal Church of Germantown		built NRHP-listed		Philadelphia, Pennsylvania	
St. Stephen's Episcopal Church (Philadelphia, Pennsylvania)		built NRHP-listed		Philadelphia, Pennsylvania	
St. David's Episcopal Church		1715 built 1978 NRHP listed		Radnor, Pennsylvania	Incorporated in 1700
Church of the Good Shepherd		1894 built	1116 E Lancaster Avenue40°1′28″N 75°19′29″W	Rosemont, Pennsylvania	Gothic Revival, Anglo-Catholic
St. Matthew's Episcopal Church (Barrington, Rhode Island)		built NRHP-listed		Barrington, Rhode Island	
St. Mary's Episcopal Church (East Providence, Rhode Island)		built NRHP-listed		East Providence, Rhode Island	
Christ Episcopal Church		built NRHP-listed		Providence, Rhode Island	
Saint Thomas Episcopal Church and Rectory (Smithfield, Rhode Island)		built NRHP-listed		Smithfield, Rhode Island	
St. Andrews Episcopal Chapel (Woonsocket, Rhode Island)		built NRHP-listed		Woonsocket, Rhode Island	
Trinity Episcopal Church and Cemetery (Abbeville, South Carolina)		built NRHP-listed		Abbeville, South Carolina	
St. Thaddeus Episcopal Church (Aiken, South Carolina)		built NRHP-listed		Aiken, South Carolina	
Church of the Holy Apostles, Episcopal (Barnwell, South Carolina)		1856 built 1972 NRHP-listed	1706 Hagood Avenue33°14′23″N 81°21′49.01″W	Barnwell, South Carolina	Carpenter Gothic
Old St. Andrew's Parish Church		built 1706; NRHP-listed		Charleston, South Carolina	
St. Michael's Episcopal Church (Charleston, South Carolina)		built NRHP-listed		Charleston, South Carolina	
St. Philip's Episcopal Church (Charleston, South Carolina)		built NRHP-listed		Charleston, South Carolina	
St. Stephen's Episcopal Church (Charleston, South Carolina)		1836 built 1970 NRHP-CP	32.784956°N 79.931128°W	Charleston, South Carolina	Founded in 1822, the church was the first Episcopal church in the U.S. where pews didn't cost attendants.
St. David's Episcopal Church and Cemetery (Cheraw, South Carolina)		built NRHP-listed		Cheraw, South Carolina	
Trinity Episcopal Church (Columbia, South Carolina)		built NRHP-listed		Columbia, South Carolina	
St. Philip's Episcopal Church, Bradford Springs		built NRHP-listed		Dalzell, South Carolina	
Saint Thomas' Protestant Episcopal Church (Eastover, South Carolina)		built NRHP-listed		Eastover, South Carolina	
Trinity Episcopal Church (Edisto Island, South Carolina)		built NRHP-listed		Edisto Island, South Carolina	
Christ Church		built NRHP-listed		Florence, South Carolina	
Prince George Winyah Parish Church		built NRHP-listed		Georgetown, South Carolina	
St. James Episcopal Church, Santee		built NRHP-listed		Georgetown, South Carolina	
Christ Church (Episcopal) and Churchyard		built NRHP-listed		Greenville, South Carolina	
All Saints Church (Pawleys Island, South Carolina)		1916 built 1991 NRHP-listed	33°28′3″N 79°8′24″W	Pawleys Island, South Carolina	Classical Revival
Summer Chapel, Prince Frederick's Episcopal Church		built NRHP-listed		Plantersville, South Carolina	
Summer Chapel Rectory, Prince Frederick's Episcopal Church		built NRHP-listed		Plantersville, South Carolina	
St. Stephen's Episcopal Church (Ridgeway, South Carolina)		built NRHP-listed		Ridgeway, South Carolina	
St. Stephen's Episcopal Church (St. Stephens, South Carolina)		built NRHP-listed		St. Stephens, South Carolina	
Holy Cross Episcopal Church (Stateburg, South Carolina)		built NRHP-listed		Stateburg, South Carolina	
Episcopal Church of the Nativity (Union, South Carolina)		built NRHP-listed		Union, South Carolina	
Holy Fellowship Episcopal Church (Greenwood, South Dakota)		built NRHP-listed		Greenwood, South Dakota	
Trinity Episcopal Church (Groton, South Dakota)		built NRHP-listed		Groton, South Dakota	
Grace Episcopal Church (Huron, South Dakota)		built NRHP-listed		Huron, South Dakota	
Emmanuel Episcopal Church (Rapid City, South Dakota)		built NRHP-listed		Rapid City, South Dakota	
St. Andrew's Episcopal Church (Scotland, South Dakota)		built NRHP-listed		Scotland, South Dakota	
Episcopal Church of All Angels (Spearfish, South Dakota)		1895 built 1976 NRHP-listed	129 W. Michigan44°29′38″N 103°51′38″W	Spearfish, South Dakota	
St. Paul's Episcopal Church (Chattanooga, Tennessee)		built NRHP-listed		Chattanooga, Tennessee	
St. Luke's Episcopal Church (Cleveland, Tennessee)		built NRHP-listed		Cleveland, Tennessee	
St. John's Episcopal Church (Columbia, Tennessee)		built NRHP-listed		Columbia, Tennessee	
St. Peter's Episcopal Church (Columbia, Tennessee)		built NRHP-listed		Columbia, Tennessee	
St. Matthew's Episcopal Church (Covington, Tennessee)		built NRHP-listed		Covington, Tennessee	
St. James Episcopal Church (Cumberland Furnace, Tennessee)		built NRHP-listed		Cumberland Furnace, Tennessee	
St. Paul's Episcopal Church (Franklin, Tennessee)		built NRHP-listed		Franklin, Tennessee	
St. Luke Episcopal Church (Jackson, Tennessee)		built NRHP-listed		Jackson, Tennessee	
Old Trinity Episcopal Church (Mason, Tennessee)		built NRHP-listed		Mason, Tennessee	
Calvary Episcopal Church and Parish House		built NRHP-listed		Memphis, Tennessee	
Grace Episcopal Church (Memphis, Tennessee)		built 2005 NRHP-listed	555 Vance Ave.	Memphis, Tennessee	NRHP-listed in Shelby County
St. Ann's Episcopal Church (Nashville, Tennessee)		built NRHP-listed		Nashville, Tennessee	
Christ Episcopal Church and Parish House		built NRHP-listed		South Pittsburg, Tennessee	
Grace Episcopal Church (Spring Hill, Tennessee)		built NRHP-listed		Spring Hill, Tennessee	
Trinity Episcopal Church (Winchester, Tennessee)		built NRHP-listed		Winchester, Tennessee	
St. David's Episcopal Church (Austin, Texas)		built NRHP-listed		Austin, Texas	
Old St. Luke's Episcopal Church (Belton, Texas)		built NRHP-listed		Belton, Texas	
St. John's Church (Brownwood, Texas)		built NRHP-listed		Brownwood, Texas	
Saint Andrew's Episcopal Church (Bryan, Texas)		built NRHP-listed		Bryan, Texas	
Grace Episcopal Church (Cuero, Texas)		built NRHP-listed		Cuero, Texas	
Grace Episcopal Church (Galveston, Texas)		built NRHP-listed		Galveston, Texas	
Trinity Protestant Episcopal Church (Galveston, Texas)		built NRHP-listed		Galveston, Texas	
St. James Episcopal Church (La Grange, Texas)		built NRHP-listed		La Grange, Texas	
Emmanuel Episcopal Church (Lockhart, Texas)		1856 built 1974 NRHP; 1978 NRHP-CP	SE corner of N. Church and Walnut Sts. 29.8853°N 97.673333°W	Lockhart, Texas	NRHP-listed in Caldwell County, and a Recorded Texas Historic Landmark; and part of the Caldwell County Courthouse Historic District
Emmanuel Episcopal Church (San Angelo, Texas)		built NRHP-listed		San Angelo, Texas	
St. Mark's Episcopal Church (San Antonio, Texas)		built NRHP-listed		San Antonio, Texas	
Episcopalian Rectory (San Marcos, Texas)		built NRHP-listed		San Marcos, Texas	
Saint Paul's Episcopal Church (Waxahachie, Texas)		built NRHP-listed		Waxahachie, Texas	
St. Christopher's Episcopal Mission		built NRHP-listed		Bluff, Utah	
Episcopal Church of the Good Shepherd (Ogden, Utah)		built NRHP-listed		Ogden, Utah	
St. Luke's Episcopal Church (Park City, Utah)		built NRHP-listed		Park City, Utah	
St. Mark's Episcopal Cathedral (Salt Lake City, Utah)		built NRHP-listed		Salt Lake City, Utah	
St. Paul's Episcopal Church and Lodge		built NRHP-listed		Vernal, Utah	
St. John's Episcopal Church (Highgate Falls, Vermont)		built NRHP-listed		Highgate Falls, Vermont	
St. Bartholomew's Episcopal Church (Montgomery, Vermont)		built NRHP-listed		Montgomery, Vermont	
St. Ann's Episcopal Church (Richford, Vermont)		built NRHP-listed		Richford, Vermont	
St. Pauls's Episcopal Church (Royalton, Vermont)		built NRHP-listed		Royalton, Vermont	
Protestant Episcopal Theological Seminary		built NRHP-listed		Alexandria, Virginia	
St. Paul's Episcopal Church (Alexandria, Virginia)		built NRHP-listed		Alexandria, Virginia	
Christ Episcopal Church		built NRHP-listed		Big Stone Gap, Virginia	
St. Luke's Episcopal Church (Fine Creek Mill, Virginia)		built NRHP-listed		Fine Creek Mill, Virginia	
Saint Stephen's Episcopal Church		built NRHP-listed		Forest, Virginia	
Immanuel Episcopal Church (Mechanicsville, Virginia)		built NRHP-listed		Mechanicsville, Virginia	
Trinity Episcopal Church (Portsmouth, Virginia)		built NRHP-listed		Portsmouth, Virginia	
Emmanuel Episcopal Church (Powhatan, Virginia)		built NRHP-listed		Powhatan, Virginia	
Trinity Episcopal Church (Staunton, Virginia)		built NRHP-listed		Staunton, Virginia	
St. John's Episcopal Church (Richmond, Virginia)		built NRHP-listed		Richmond, Virginia	
St. John's Episcopal Church (Roanoke, Virginia)		built NRHP-listed		Roanoke, Virginia	
St. John's Episcopal Church (Wytheville, Virginia)		built NRHP-listed		Wytheville, Virginia	
St. Paul's Episcopal Church (Hanover, Virginia)		built NRHP-listed		Hanover, Virginia	
St. Paul's Episcopal Church (Haymarket, Virginia)		built NRHP-listed		Haymarket, Virginia	
Virginia Episcopal School		built NRHP-listed		Lynchburg, Virginia	
St. Peter's Episcopal Church (Oak Grove, Virginia)		built NRHP-listed		Oak Grove, Virginia	
St. Andrews Episcopal Church (Chelan, Washington)		built NRHP-listed		Chelan, Washington	
Emmanuel Episcopal Church (Eastsound, Washington)		built NRHP-listed		Eastsound, Washington	
Holy Trinity Episcopal Church (Palouse, Washington)		built NRHP-listed		Palouse, Washington	
St. Andrew's Episcopal Church (Port Angeles, Washington)		built NRHP-listed		Port Angeles, Washington	
St. Paul's Episcopal Church (Port Townsend, Washington)		built NRHP-listed		Port Townsend, Washington	
Christ Episcopal Church		built NRHP-listed		Puyallup, Washington	
St. Peter's Episcopal Church (Tacoma, Washington)		built NRHP-listed		Tacoma, Washington	
Grace Protestant Episcopal Church (Washington, D.C.)		built NRHP-listed		Washington, D.C.	
St. Luke's Episcopal Church (Washington, D.C.)		built NRHP-listed		Washington, D.C.	
St. Mary's Episcopal Church (Washington, D.C.)		built NRHP-listed		Washington, D.C.	
St. Paul's Episcopal Church (Washington, D.C.)		built NRHP-listed		Washington, D.C.	
St. John's Episcopal Church (Charleston, West Virginia)		built NRHP-listed		Charleston, West Virginia	
Trinity Episcopal Church Rectory (Parkersburg, West Virginia)		built NRHP-listed		Parkersburg, West Virginia	
Trinity Protestant Episcopal Church (Parkersburg, West Virginia)		built NRHP-listed		Parkersburg, West Virginia	
St. Mark's Episcopal Church (St. Albans, West Virginia)		built NRHP-listed		St. Albans, West Virginia	
Christ Episcopal Church		built NRHP-listed		Bayfield, Wisconsin	
St. Mark's Episcopal Church (Beaver Dam, Wisconsin)		built NRHP-listed		Beaver Dam, Wisconsin	
St. Paul's Episcopal Church (Beloit, Wisconsin)		built NRHP-listed		Beloit, Wisconsin	
St. Matthew's Episcopal Church (Kenosha, Wisconsin)		built NRHP-listed		Kenosha, Wisconsin	
Grace Episcopal Church (Madison, Wisconsin)		built NRHP-listed		Madison, Wisconsin	
All Saints' Episcopal Cathedral Complex		1871 built 1898 consecrated 1974 NRHP-listed	804–828 E. Juneau Ave43.0460°N 87.9013°W	Milwaukee, Wisconsin	E. Townsend Mix-designed; Gothic Revival
St. James Episcopal Church (Milwaukee, Wisconsin)		built NRHP-listed		Milwaukee, Wisconsin	
St. Paul's Episcopal Church (Milwaukee, Wisconsin)		built NRHP-listed		Milwaukee, Wisconsin	
St. Mark's Episcopal Church, Guild Hall and Vicarage		built NRHP-listed		Oconto, Wisconsin	
St. Luke's Episcopal Church, Chapel, Guildhall, and Rectory		1866 built 1979 NRHP-listed	614 S. Main St.42.72617°N 87.78300°W	Racine, Wisconsin	Gothic Revival
St. Peter's Episcopal Church (Ripon, Wisconsin)		built NRHP-listed		Ripon, Wisconsin	
St. John's Episcopal Church (Sparta, Wisconsin)		built NRHP-listed		Sparta, Wisconsin	
St. Paul's Episcopal Church (Watertown, Wisconsin)		built NRHP-listed		Watertown, Wisconsin	
St. Matthias Episcopal Church (Waukesha, Wisconsin)		built NRHP-listed		Waukesha, Wisconsin	
St. Luke's Episcopal Church (Buffalo, Wyoming)		built NRHP-listed		Buffalo, Wyoming	
St. Mark's Episcopal Church (Cheyenne, Wyoming)		built NRHP-listed		Cheyenne, Wyoming	
Christ Episcopal Church and Rectory		built NRHP-listed		Douglas, Wyoming	
St. Paul's Episcopal Church (Evanston, Wyoming)		built NRHP-listed		Evanston, Wyoming	
Shoshone-Episcopal Mission		built NRHP-listed		Fort Washakie, Wyoming	
St. John's Episcopal Church and Rectory (Jackson, Wyoming)		built NRHP-listed		Jackson, Wyoming	
St. Matthew's Cathedral		1892–96 built 1984 NRHP-listed	104 S. 4th St.41°18′45″N 105°35′33″W	Laramie, Wyoming	Gothic Revival; William Halsey Wood, architect
St. Elizabeth's Memorial Chapel		1921 built	41°9′18″N 74°13′39″W	Tuxedo, New York	Trowbridge & Livingston, architect; Currently affiliated with the Anglican Church in America
St. Stephen's Episcopal Church (San Luis Obispo, California)		1873 built	1344 Nipomo St 35.2762°N 120.6636°W	San Luis Obispo, California	Carpenter Gothic

- List of the original 30 Anglican parishes in the Province of Maryland
- List of post-1692 Anglican parishes in the Province of Maryland

== Former Anglican churches in China ==
- Holy Saviour's Cathedral (Beijing)
- Trinity Church, Changsha
- St John's Church, Chengdu
- Anglican Church, Dalian
- St. John's Church, Fuzhou
- Gospel Church, Guanghan
- Shamian Church, Guangzhou
- Gospel Church, Jiangyou
- St John's Cathedral, Langzhong
- Trinity Church, Langzhong
- Gospel Church, Mianyang
- Gospel Church, Mianzhu
- St. Paul's Church, Nanjing
- Holy Trinity Church, Shanghai
- All Saints' Church, Tianjin
- Gospel Church, Wanzhou
- Holy Cross Church, Wuxi

== See also ==
- List of Anglo-Catholic churches
- List of Anglican churches in Hong Kong
- List of Anglican churches in Macau
- List of Anglican churches in Melbourne
- List of Anglican churches in the Diocese of Sydney
- List of Anglican churches in Toronto
- List of Anglican cathedrals in Canada
