= Shoshone-Episcopal Mission =

- U.S. National Register of Historic Places
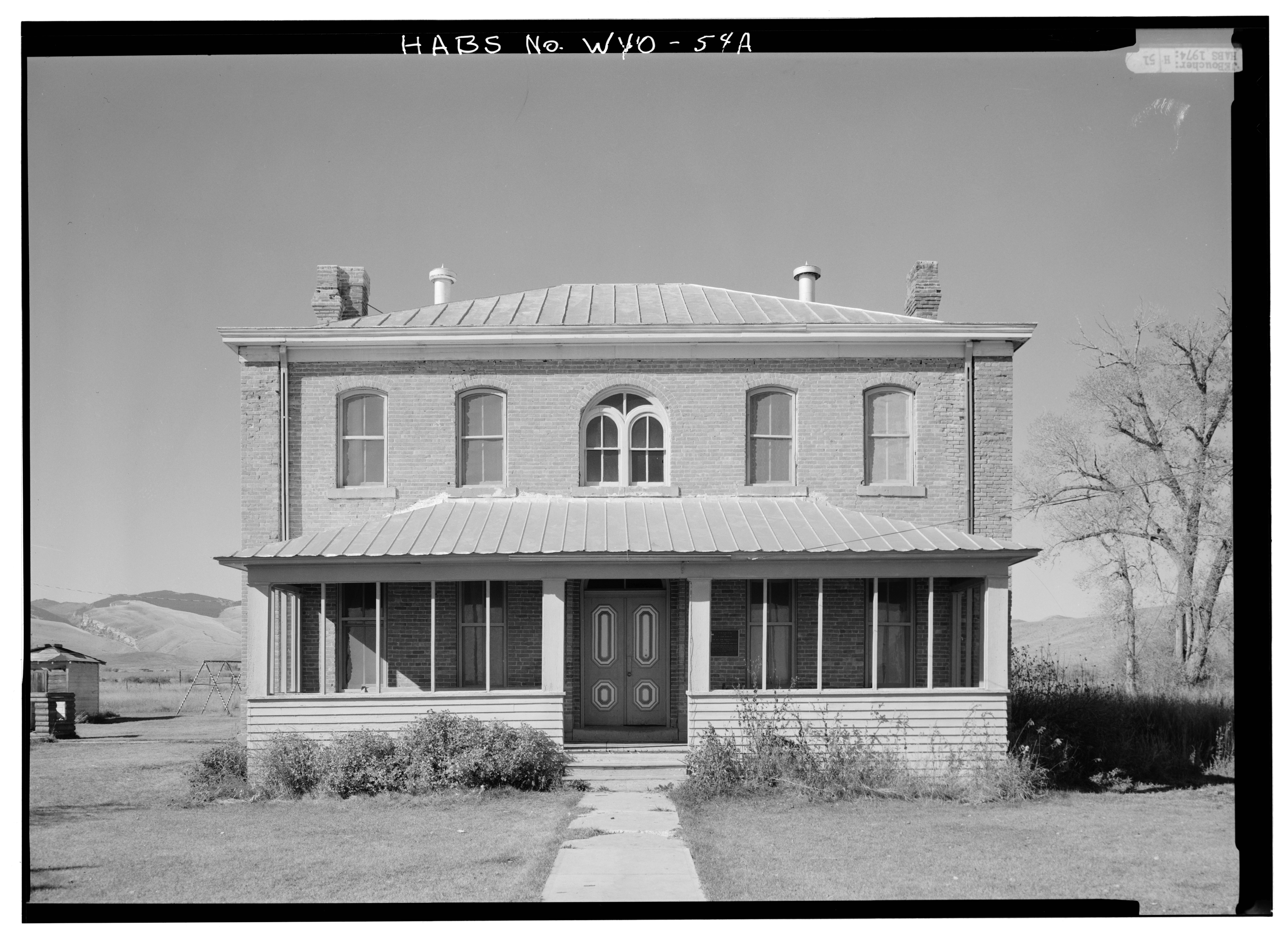

- Location within Wyoming Location within the United States
- Nearest city: Fort Washakie, Wyoming
- Coordinates: 42°59′09″N 108°54′17″W
- Area: 160 acres (65 ha)
- Built: 1889–90
- Architectural style: Colonial Revival, Other, Georgian
- NRHP reference No.: 73001931
- Added to NRHP: April 11, 1973

Shoshone-Episcopal Mission (also known as Shoshone-Episcopal Mission School for Shoshone Girls) is a historic mission and school in Fort Washakie, Wyoming. The school was built from 1889 to 1890 by Rev. John Roberts, the minister and teacher on the Wind River Indian Reservation. Roberts built the boarding school to teach the Shoshone girls living on the reservation; as many of the students lived up to 20 miles (32 km) away from the school, it was necessary to build a boarding school to teach them. The school later became the headquarters of the entire Episcopal mission on the reservation.

The mission was added to the National Register of Historic Places on April 11, 1973.

On March 17, 2016, the building was destroyed by a fire.
