= St. John's Episcopal Church (Abilene, Kansas) =

Historic church in Kansas, United States

- U.S. National Register of Historic Places
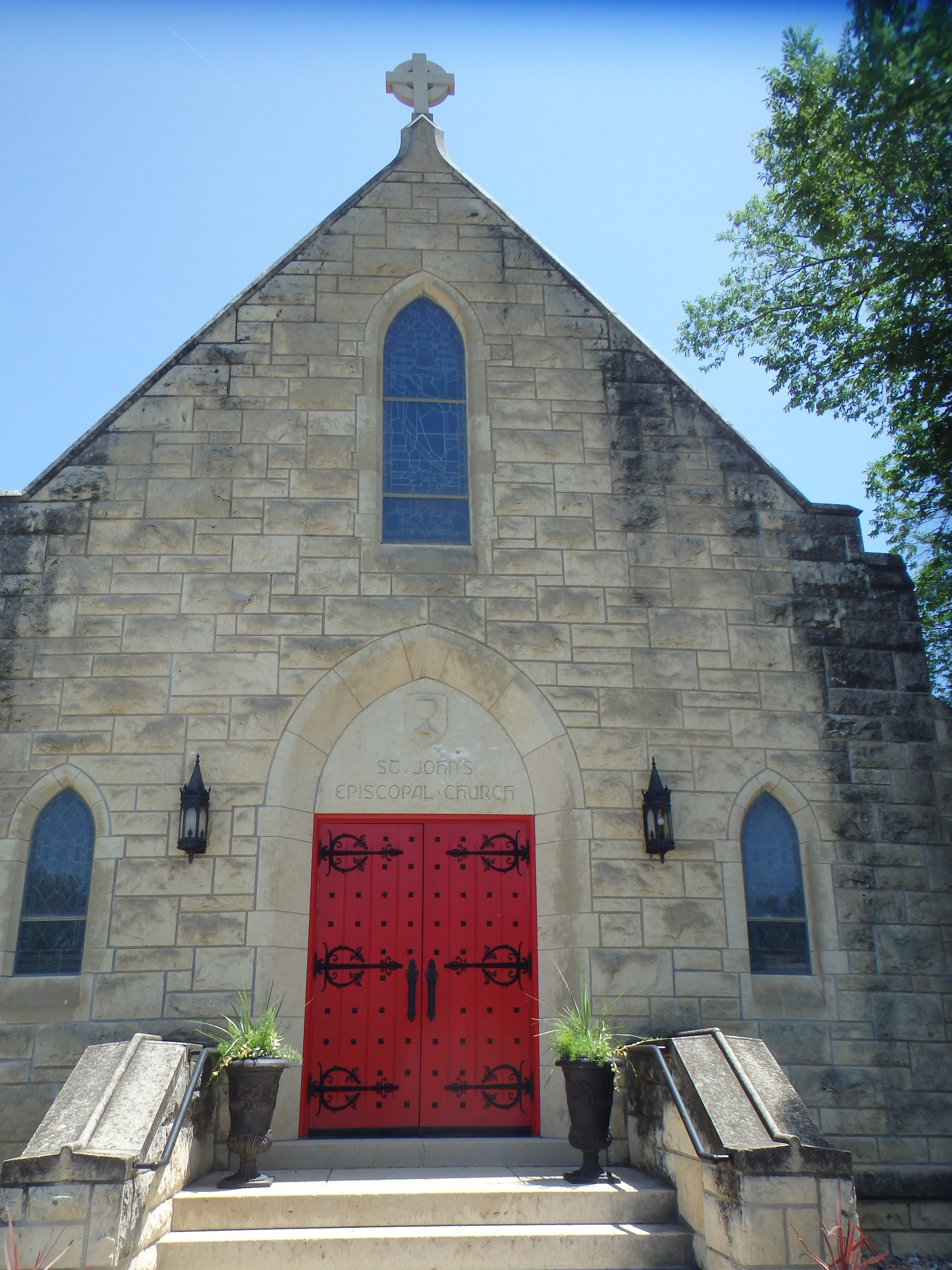

- Location within Kansas Location within the United States
- Location: 519 N. Buckeye Ave., Abilene, Kansas
- Coordinates: 38°55′12″N 97°12′47″W
- Area: less than one acre
- Built: c. 1939
- Architect: Cayton, Frank
- Architectural style: Late Gothic Revival
- NRHP reference No.: 01000537
- Added to NRHP: May 25, 2001

The St. John's Episcopal Church in Abilene, Kansas, is a historic church at 519 N. Buckeye Avenue. It is a parish of the Episcopal Diocese of Kansas, based in Topeka. Its vicar is the Rev. Shawn Sherraden.

In 2015, the church reported 91 members; in 2023, it reported 35 members. No membership statistics were reported in 2024 national parochial reports. Plate and pledge financial support reported by the church in 2024 was $33,525. Average Sunday Attendance (ASA) reported in 2024 was 22 persons. This was a relative decrease from ASA of 36 reported in 2020.

== Building and history ==
It was built in about 1939 and added to the National Register of Historic Places in 2001. It is "a modest yet nicely articulated example of the Gothic Revival style." It is cruciform in plan, built in stone, and incorporates its predecessor church building, a simple wood Gothic Revival structure from the 1880s.
