= St. Alban's Episcopal Church (Lidgerwood, North Dakota) =

Historic church in North Dakota, United States

- U.S. National Register of Historic Places
- Location within North Dakota Location within the United States
- Location: Jct. of Hammond and Eastern Aves., SW corner, Lidgerwood, North Dakota
- Coordinates: 46°4′32″N 97°8′43″W
- Built: 1910
- Architectural style: Late Gothic Revival
- MPS: Episcopal Churches of North Dakota MPS
- NRHP reference No.: 92001607
- Added to NRHP: December 3, 1992

The former St. Alban's Episcopal Church is an historic stone Late Gothic Revival-style Episcopal church located on the southwest corner of Hammond and Eastern avenues in Lidgerwood, North Dakota. On December 3, 1992, it was added to the National Register of Historic Places. As of that date, the building housed Harmony Lodge No. 53 of the Ancient, Free & Accepted Masons. Harmony Lodge, founded in 1899, surrendered its charter in 1994.. It is currently the Lidgerwood Community Museum.
