= Trinity Episcopal Church (Owensboro, Kentucky) =

Historic church in Kentucky, United States

- U.S. National Register of Historic Places
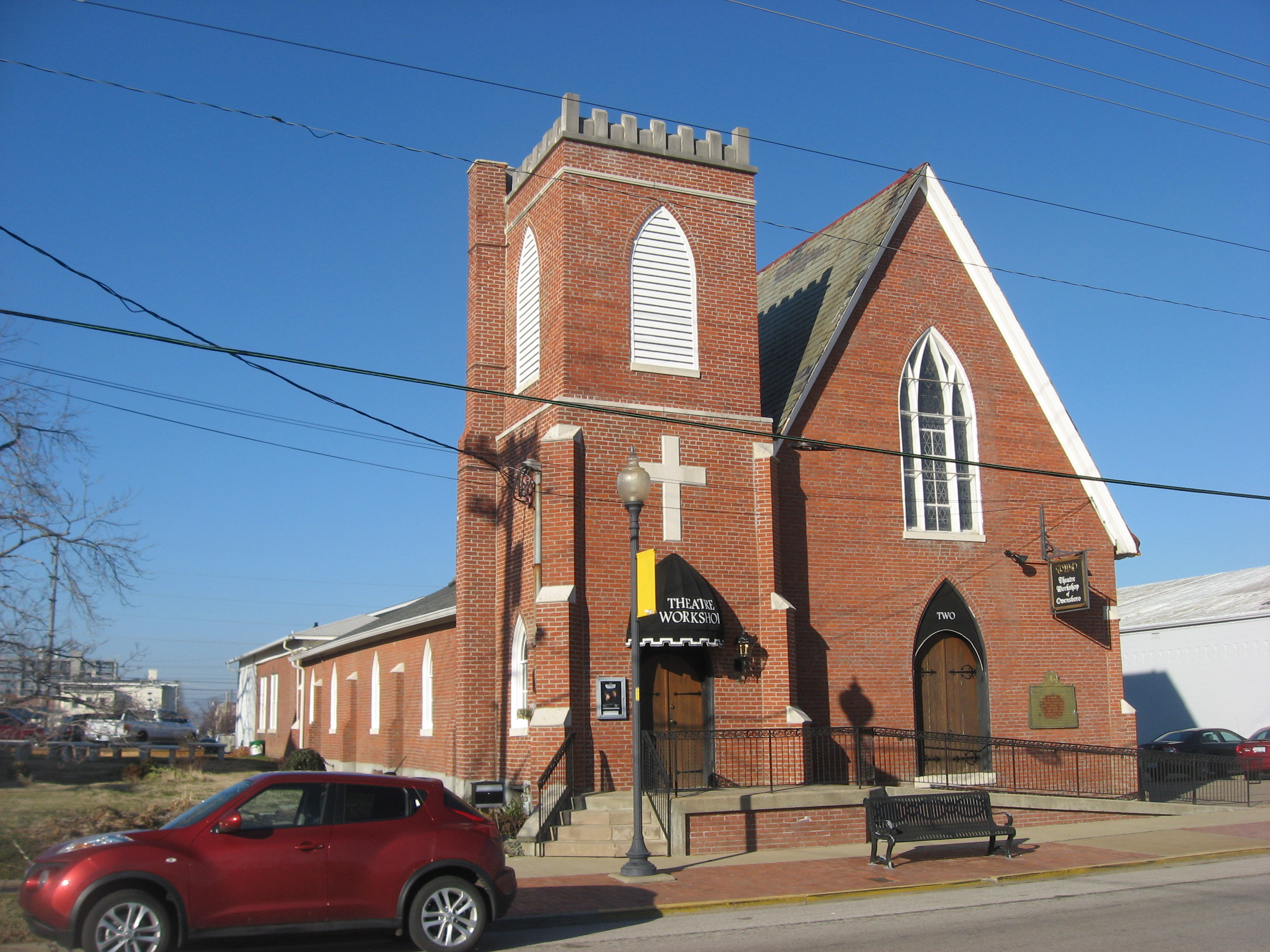
- Front and western side

- Location within Kentucky Location within the United States
- Location: 403 W. 5th St., Owensboro, Kentucky
- Coordinates: 37°46′21″N 87°06′53″W
- Area: 1 acre (0.40 ha)
- Architectural style: Lancet
- NRHP reference No.: 72000530
- Added to NRHP: April 10, 1972

The Trinity Episcopal Church in Owensboro, Kentucky, is a historic church at 403 W. 5th Street. It was added to the National Register of Historic Places in 1972.

Also known as Old Trinity Episcopal Church, it was built in 1875 and is deemed " a good example of the English influence on early church architecture in the United States."

The church was in regular use until 1964 when the parish built a new building, the "New Trinity Episcopal Church", at 720 Ford Avenue. As of early 1972, the building was in use by the Cliff Hagan's Boys Club, which was to use it for a short time before another facility would become ready.
