= Trinity Episcopal Church (Pine Bluff, Arkansas) =

Historic church in Arkansas, United States

- U.S. National Register of Historic Places
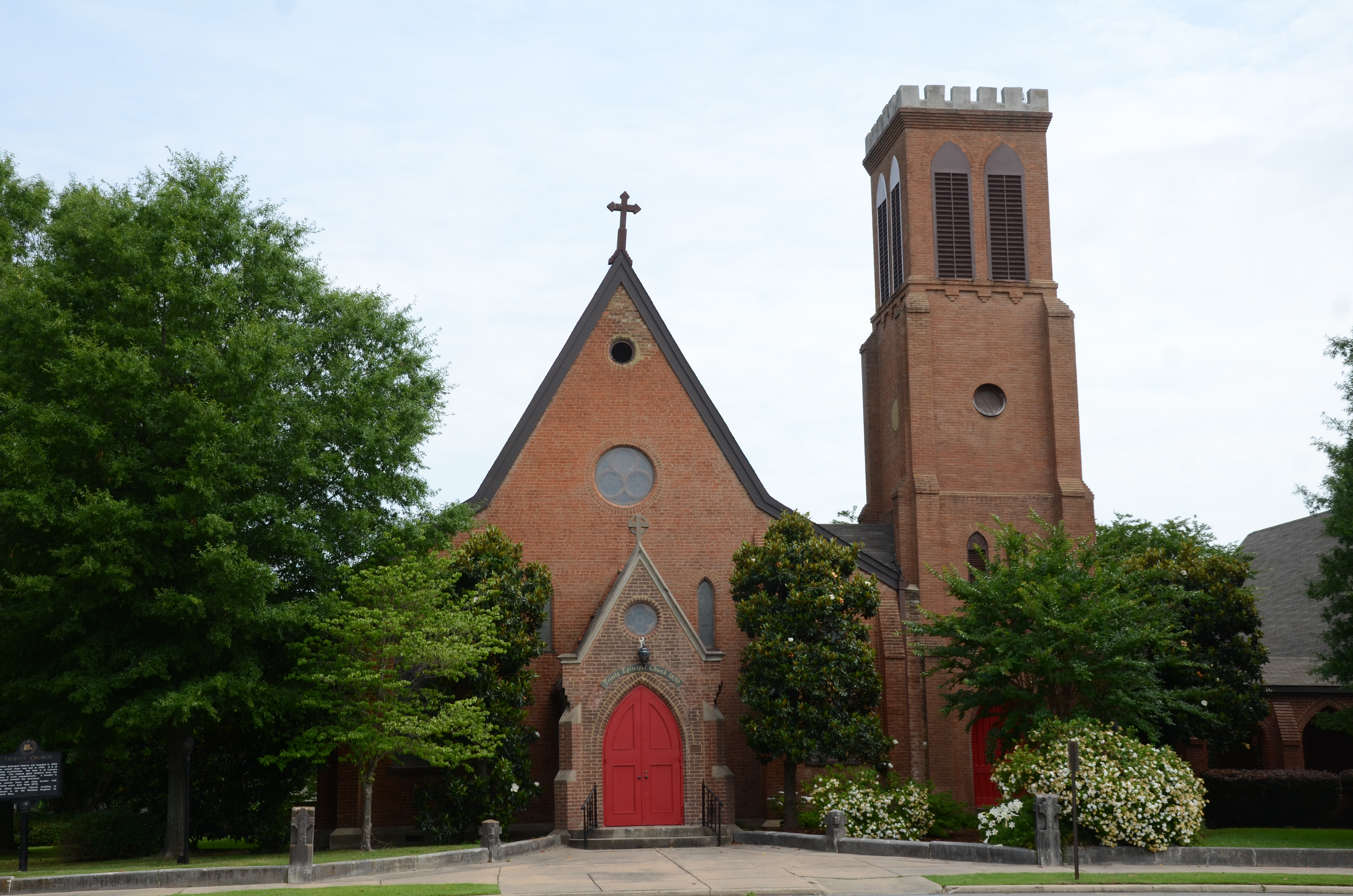

- Location within Arkansas Location within the United States
- Location: 703 W. 3rd Ave., Pine Bluff, Arkansas
- Coordinates: 34°13′40″N 92°0′36″W
- Area: less than one acre
- Built: 1866
- Architectural style: Gothic
- NRHP reference No.: 74000479
- Added to NRHP: July 30, 1974

Trinity Episcopal Church (also known as St. John's Parish) is a historic church at 703 West 3rd Avenue (corner of Oak Street) in Pine Bluff, Arkansas. Its congregation meets in a brick Gothic Revival structure, with a square buttressed tower and buttressed side walls with lancet-arched stained glass windows. The church was built 1866-70 for a church congregation organized in 1860 by the Rev. Robert Trimble. Initially named St. John's, it was renamed Trinity after Trimble received guidance from members of the Trinity Church in New York City. It is unique in Arkansas as having a burial chamber under its chancel; it is that of early parishioner Cornelia Bell Roane, who died in 1862. It is a congregation of the Episcopal Diocese of Arkansas.

The building was listed on the National Register of Historic Places in 1974.

In 2015, the church reported 359 members; in 2023, it reported 337 members. No membership statistics were reported in 2024 national parochial reports. Plate and pledge financial support reported by the church in 2024 was $127,736. Average Sunday Attendance (ASA) reported in 2024 was 37 persons. This was a relative decrease from ASA of 76 persons reported in 2015.

== See also ==
- National Register of Historic Places listings in Jefferson County, Arkansas
