= St. Andrew's Episcopal Church (Port Angeles, Washington) =

Historic church in Washington, United States

- U.S. National Register of Historic Places
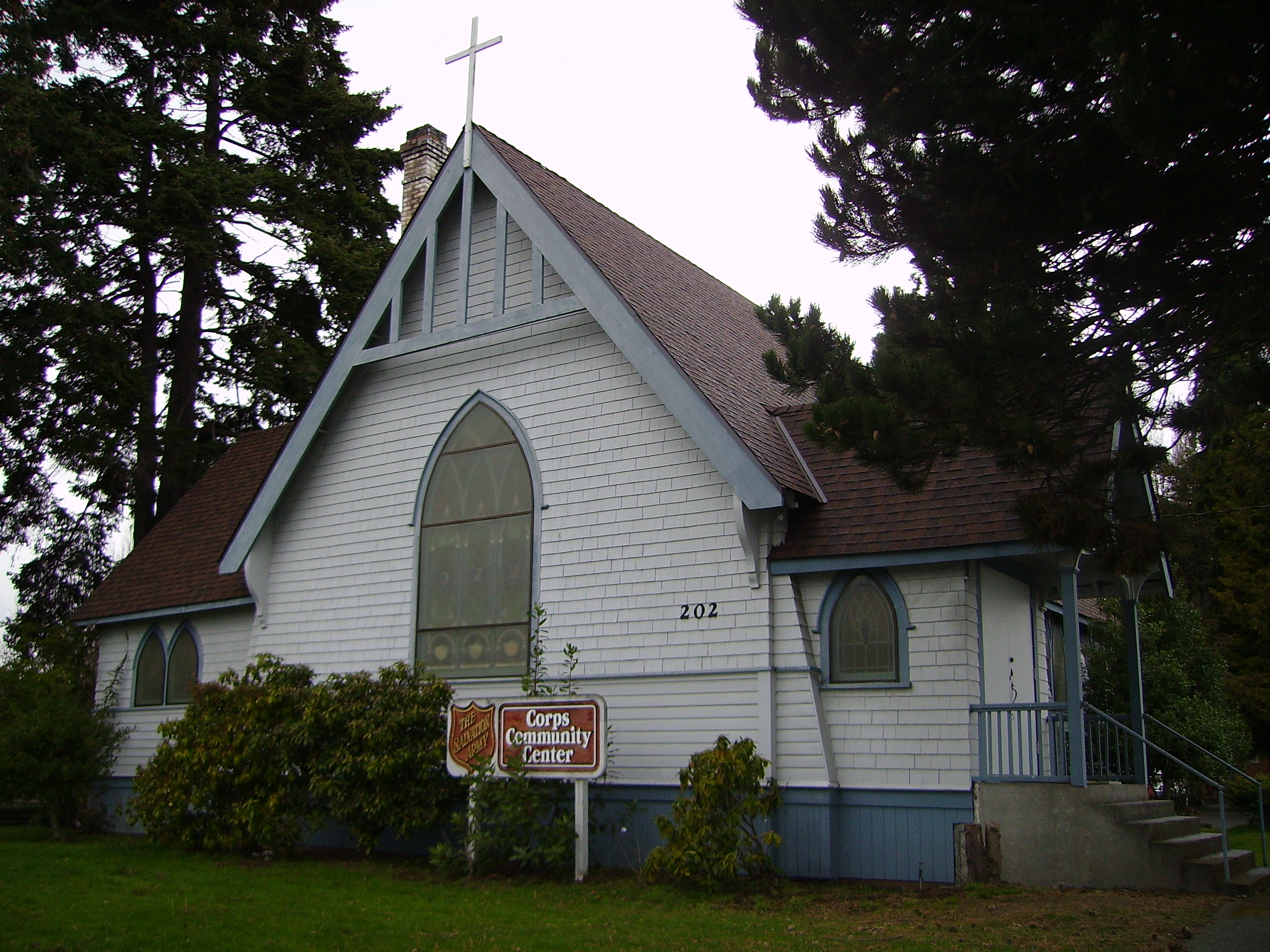

- Location within Washington (state)
- Location: 206 South Peabody Street, Port Angeles, Washington
- Coordinates: 48°06′57″N 123°25′46″W
- Area: less than one acre
- Built: 1905
- Architectural style: Gothic Revival
- NRHP reference No.: 87001942
- Added to NRHP: November 5, 1987

St. Andrew's Episcopal Church, also known as the Salvation Army Citidel Corps and now hosting the Salvation Army Corps Community Center, is a historic building located at 206 South Peabody Street, in Port Angeles, Washington.

Originally a church, the structure was built in 1905 in Gothic Revival style. Between 1905 and 1914 a free standing parish hall was constructed south of the chapel. St. Andrew's became an official parish in 1946. In 1966, due to the parish having outgrown the small chapel, a new church was built about 1 mile (1.6 km) to the south, on East Park Avenue, and the building was sold to the Salvation Army, which still uses it today as its Corps Community Center.
