= St. Ann's Episcopal Church (Nashville, Tennessee) =

Historic church in Tennessee, United States

- U.S. National Register of Historic Places
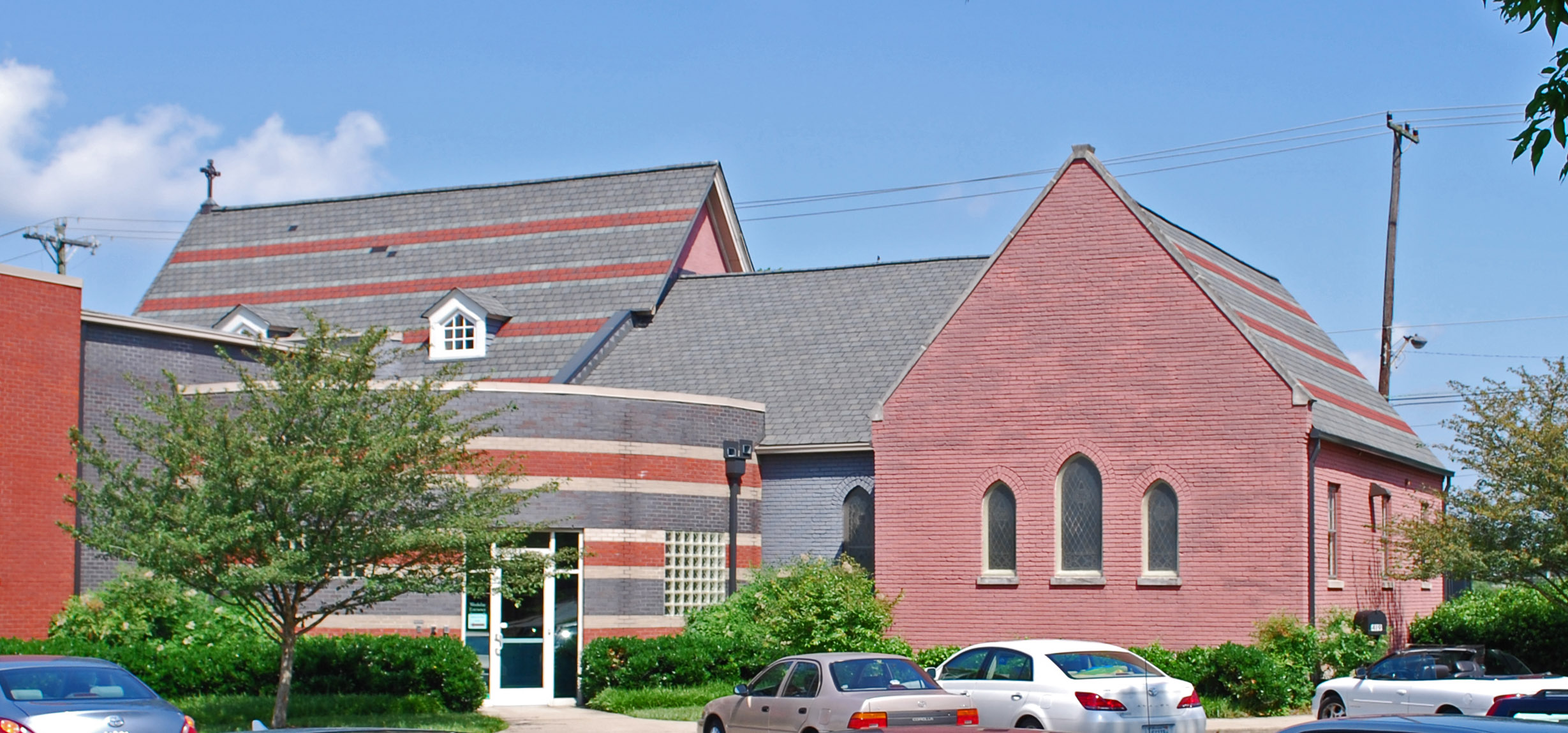

- Location within Tennessee Location within the United States
- Location: 419 Woodland St., Nashville, Tennessee
- Coordinates: 36°10′18″N 86°45′56″W
- Area: less than one acre
- Built: 1882
- Architect: Simmon & Phillips
- Architectural style: Gothic
- NRHP reference No.: 83004237
- Added to NRHP: November 18, 1983

St. Ann's Episcopal Church is a historic church at 419 Woodland Street in Nashville, Tennessee. It was originally built in 1882 and added to the National Register of Historic Places in 1983. The historic sanctuary was destroyed by a tornado in April, 1998. The church was rebuilt on the same location later that year.
