= St. Mark's Episcopal Church (Huntersville, North Carolina) =

Historic church in North Carolina, United States

- U.S. National Register of Historic Places
- Location within North Carolina Location within the United States
- Location: SR 2004; also the southern side of NC 2004 east of its junction with NC 2074, near Huntersville, North Carolina
- Coordinates: 35°20′52″N 80°52′51″W
- Area: 9.7 acres (3.9 ha)
- Built: 1886, 1897
- Built by: McAuley, John Ellis
- Architectural style: Gothic, English Country Gothic, Vernacular Victorian
- NRHP reference No.: 84002410, 91000076 (Boundary Increase)
- Added to NRHP: March 1, 1984, February 21, 1991 (Boundary Increase)

St. Mark's Episcopal Church is a historic Episcopal church located at Huntersville, North Carolina. The church was built in 1886–1887, and is a small rural "English country Gothic"-style brick church. It has a cross-shaped plan with a three-bay-long nave, a pair of small single-bay side wings, and a one-bay chancel. Also on the property is the wood-frame parsonage; a two-story L-shaped dwelling with a Victorian doorway and porch trim. It was built about 1897.

It was listed on the National Register of Historic Places in 1984, with a boundary increase in 1991.
