= Immanuel Chapel Protestant Episcopal Church =

Historic church in Kentucky, United States

- U.S. National Register of Historic Places
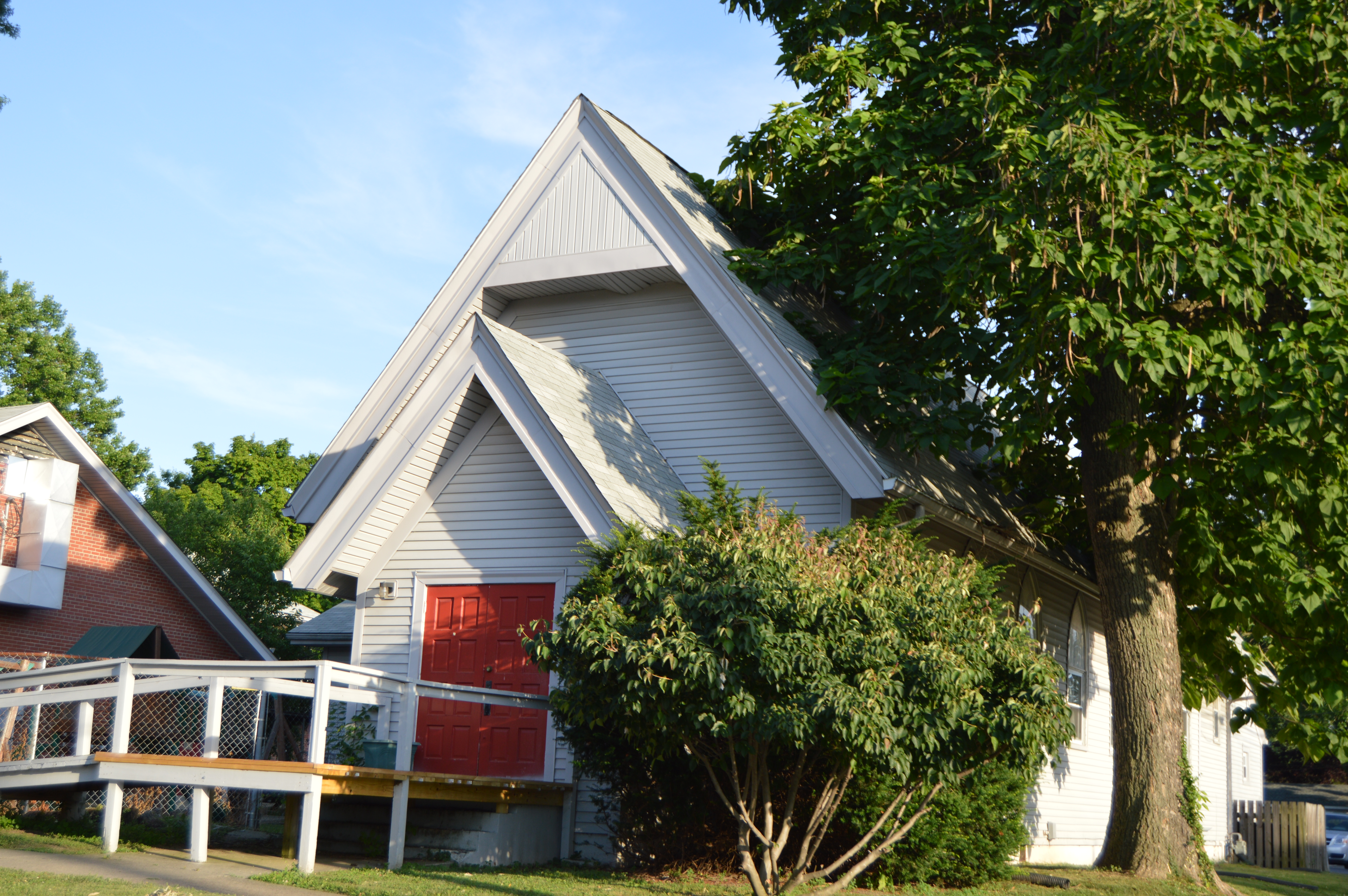
- Front and western side

- Location within Kentucky Location within the United States
- Location: 410 Fairmont Ave., Louisville, Kentucky
- Coordinates: 38°11′42″N 85°46′3″W
- Area: less than one acre
- Built: 1909
- Architectural style: Gothic, Gothic Revival
- MPS: South Louisville MRA
- NRHP reference No.: 83002687
- Added to NRHP: September 06, 1983

The Immanuel Chapel Protestant Episcopal Church in Louisville, Kentucky, which has also been known as Emmanuel Episcopal Church, is a historic church at 410 Fairmont Avenue. It was built in 1909 and added to the National Register of Historic Places in 1983.

It has lancet windows down its sides. By 1983, a new church had been built next door and this building was no longer used for church services, but it was used for other purposes by the congregation.
