= St. Paul's Episcopal Church (Haymarket, Virginia) =

Historic church in Virginia, US

- U.S. National Register of Historic Places
- Virginia Landmarks Register
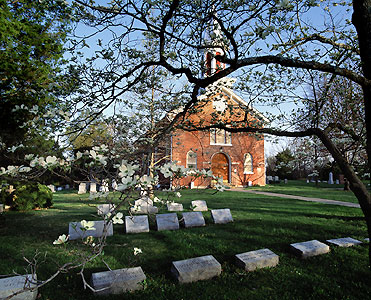
- St. Paul's Episcopal Church, November 2006

- Location within Northern Virginia Location within Virginia Location within the United States
- Location: Off VA 55, Haymarket, Virginia
- Coordinates: 38°49′5″N 77°38′26″W
- Area: 2 acres (0.81 ha)
- Built: 1801, 1867
- Architect: Wren, James
- NRHP reference No.: 75002031
- VLR No.: 233-0002

Significant dates
- Added to NRHP: January 20, 1975
- Designated VLR: December 17, 1974

St. Paul's Episcopal Church is a historic Episcopal church in Haymarket, Virginia, United States. It was started in 1801 and is a two-story, gable-roofed brick church building. The building originally served as the district courthouse for Fairfax, Fauquier, Loudon, and Prince William counties. It later housed Hygeia Academy. It was consecrated as a church in 1834, and remodeled in 1867, after being gutted during the American Civil War. The remodeling added the frame chancel, bracketed cornice, and octagonal belfry and spire.

It was added to the National Register of Historic Places in 1975.
