= St. Mary's Episcopal Church (Middlesboro, Kentucky) =

Historic church in Kentucky, United States

- U.S. National Register of Historic Places
- Location within Kentucky Location within the United States
- Location: 131 Edgewood Rd., Middlesboro, Kentucky
- Coordinates: 36°36′30″N 83°43′40″W
- Area: 0.5 acres (0.20 ha)
- Built: 1890
- Architectural style: Gothic Revival
- NRHP reference No.: 84000341
- Added to NRHP: November 15, 1984

The St. Mary's Episcopal Church in Middlesboro, Kentucky is a historic church located at 131 Edgewood Road. It was built in 1880 and opened for services in February 1881. It was added to the National Register of Historic Places in 1984.

It is a wooden church which somehow escaped fires that destroyed most wooden churches of its era. It has a cross-shape within a 60 by 20 feet (18.3 m × 6.1 m) plan.

Its NRHP nomination asserts:

Saint Mary's Episcopal Church should be included on the National Register for two reasons. First, the church served as the religious home for wealthy British investors who worked to exploit the resources of the area in a large scale venture at the close of the 19th Century. Secondly, the church survives as one of the finest examples in Southeastern Kentucky of gothic revival architecture.
