= Church of the Good Shepherd =

Church of the Good Shepherd, Chapel of the Good Shepherd, or variations thereof, may refer to:

== Australia ==
- Church of the Good Shepherd, Curtin, Australian Capital Territory
- Church of the Good Shepherd, Brookfield, Queensland
- Church of the Good Shepherd, Hadspen, Tasmania
- Church of the Good Shepherd, Bellevue, Western Australia

== Canada ==
- Church of the Good Shepherd (Vancouver), British Columbia

== Taiwan ==
- Church of the Good Shepherd (Taipei)

== New Zealand ==
- Church of the Good Shepherd, Lake Tekapo in South Canterbury
- Church of the Good Shepherd, Christchurch in Phillipstown
- Church of the Good Shepherd at Bridge Street, Ongaonga (Heritage New Zealand listing 2751. NZ Historic Place Category 2)

== United Kingdom ==
- Church of the Good Shepherd, Arbury, Cambridge
- Church of the Good Shepherd, Aylesbury, Buckinghamshire
- Church of the Good Shepherd, Brighton
- Church of the Good Shepherd, Collier Row, Greater London
- Church of The Good Shepherd, Lake, Isle of Wight
- Church of the Good Shepherd, Tatham, on Tatham Fell, Lancashire
- Church of the Good Shepherd, Lullington, Sussex
- Church of the Good Shepherd, Nottingham
- Church of the Good Shepherd, Poole, Dorset
- Church of the Good Shepherd, Rugeley, Staffordshire
- Church of the Good Shepherd, West Derby, Liverpool
- The Good Shepherd Chapel in the Parish Church of St Mary the Virgin, Gillingham, Dorset
- Chapel of the Good Shepherd, Carlett Park, in Eastham, Merseyside
- The Church of the Good Shepherd, Kirk Sandall and Edenthorpe, South Yorkshire

== United States ==
=== California ===
- Church of the Good Shepherd-Episcopal (Berkeley, California), listed on the NRHP in California
- Church of the Good Shepherd (Beverly Hills, California)
- Church of the Good Shepherd (Templeton, California)

=== Connecticut ===
- Church of the Good Shepherd and Parish House, Hartford, Connecticut, listed on the NRHP in Connecticut

=== Florida ===
- Church of the Good Shepherd (Maitland, Florida), listed on the NRHP in Orange County, Florida

=== Georgia ===
- Church of the Good Shepherd (Thomasville, Georgia), listed on the NRHP in Georgia

=== Indiana ===
- Church of the Good Shepherd (Bloomington, Indiana)

=== Louisiana ===
- Church of the Good Shepherd (Lake Charles, Louisiana), also known as Episcopal Church of the Good Shepherd, listed on the NRHP in Louisiana

=== Massachusetts ===
- Church of the Good Shepherd (Dedham, Massachusetts)

=== Minnesota ===
- Church of the Good Shepherd-Episcopal (Blue Earth, Minnesota), listed on the NRHP in Minnesota
- Church of the Good Shepherd (Coleraine, Minnesota), listed on the NRHP in Minnesota

=== New York ===
- Church of the Good Shepherd (Binghamton, New York)
- Church of the Good Shepherd (Cullen, New York), listed on the NRHP in New York
- Church of the Good Shepherd (Syracuse, New York), listed on the NRHP in New York
- Chapel of the Good Shepherd (Chautauqua, New York)
- Church of the Good Shepherd (Raquette Lake, New York)
- Church of the Good Shepherd (Rhinebeck, New York)

==== Manhattan ====
- Church of the Good Shepherd (New York City), 4967 Broadway, Inwood, Manhattan
- Church of the Good Shepherd (Episcopal), 240 E 31st Street, in Midtown Manhattan
- West Presbyterian Church (New York City) (Good Shepherd – Faith Presbyterian Church), Lincoln Square, Manhattan
- Chapel of the Good Shepherd, 440 West 21st Street, Chelsea, Manhattan, the chapel for the General Theological Seminary of the Episcopal Church.
- Chapel of the Good Shepherd (Roosevelt Island), on Roosevelt Island, Manhattan, listed on the NRHP in New York

=== North Carolina ===
- Church of the Good Shepherd (Cashiers, North Carolina), listed on the NRHP in North Carolina
- Church of the Good Shepherd (Raleigh, North Carolina)
- All Saints Chapel, Raleigh, North Carolina, listed on the NRHP in North Carolina as the Free Church of the Good Shepherd
- Chapel of the Good Shepherd (Ridgeway, North Carolina), listed on the NRHP in North Carolina

=== South Carolina ===
- Church of the Good Shepherd (Columbia, South Carolina)

=== South Dakota ===
- Church of the Good Shepherd (Sioux Falls, South Dakota)

=== Pennsylvania ===
- Church of the Good Shepherd (Hazelwood, Pennsylvania)
- Church of the Good Shepherd (Rosemont, Pennsylvania)

=== Utah ===
- Episcopal Church of the Good Shepherd (Ogden, Utah), listed on the NRHP in Utah

=== Virginia ===
- Church of the Good Shepherd (Lynchburg, Virginia), listed on the NRHP in Virginia
- Good Shepherd Anglican Church (Waynesboro, Virginia), listed on the NRHP in Virginia

=== West Virginia ===
- Good Shepherd Church (Coalburg, West Virginia), listed on the NRHP in West Virginia

== See also ==
- Episcopal Church of the Good Shepherd (disambiguation)
