= Episcopal Church of the Good Shepherd =

Episcopal Church of the Good Shepherd may refer to:

- Episcopal Church of the Good Shepherd (Berkeley, California), listed on the NRHP in California
- Church of the Good Shepherd (Lake Charles, Louisiana), also known as Episcopal Church of the Good Shepherd, listed on the NRHP in Louisiana
- Church of the Good Shepherd-Episcopal (Blue Earth, Minnesota), listed on the NRHP in Minnesota
- Episcopal Church of the Good Shepherd (Binghamton, New York), sold in 2011 to a mosque
- The Church of the Good Shepherd (Raleigh, North Carolina), historic Episcopal Church
- Church of the Good Shepherd (Rosemont, Pennsylvania), Anglo-Catholic Episcopal parish
- Episcopal Church of the Good Shepherd (Ogden, Utah), listed on the NRHP in Utah
