= Church of the Good Shepherd-Episcopal (Blue Earth, Minnesota) =

Historic church in Minnesota, United States

- Church of the Good Shepherd--Episcopal
- U.S. National Register of Historic Places
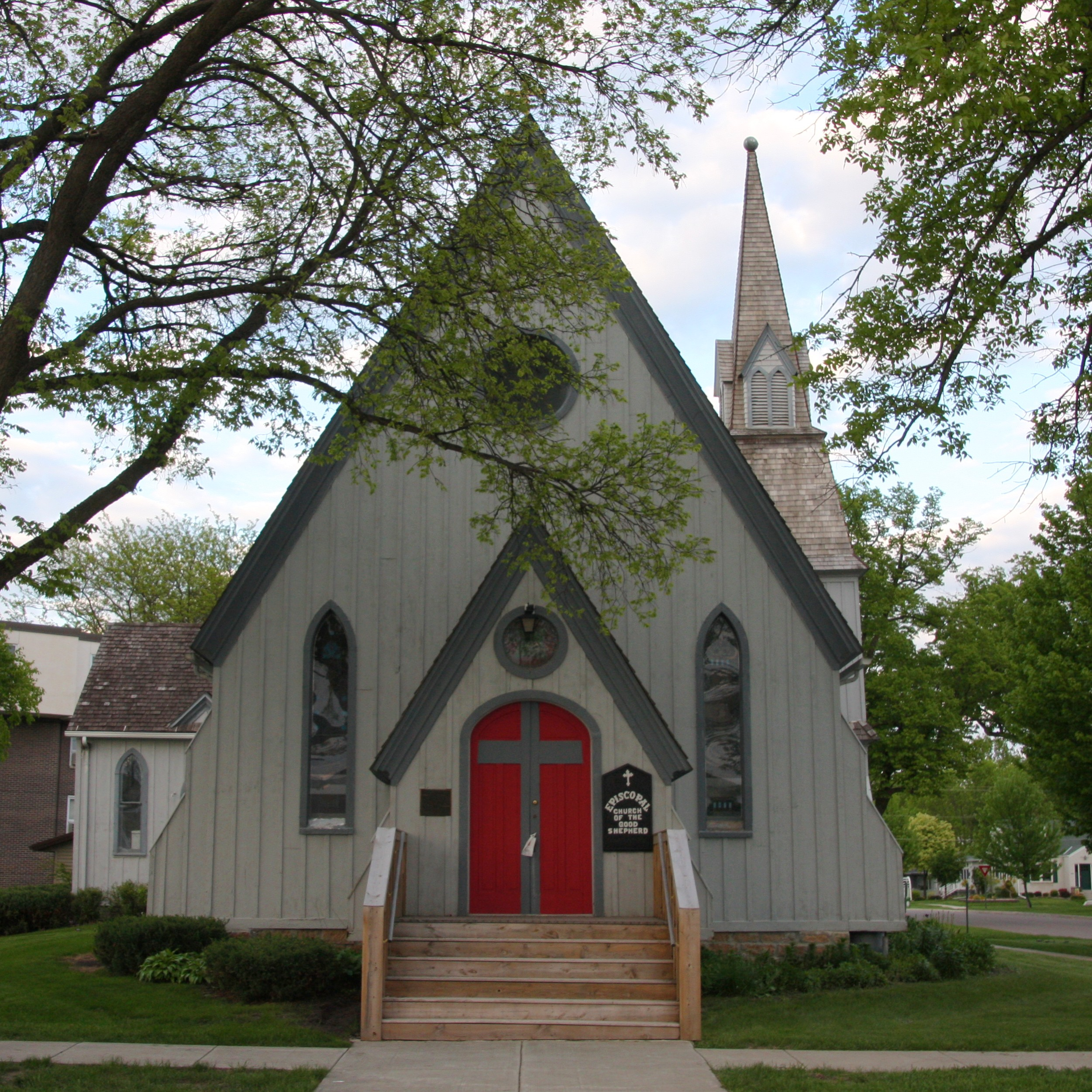
- The church seen from the west in 2016

- Location within Minnesota Location within the United States
- Location: Moore and 8th Streets, Blue Earth, Minnesota
- Coordinates: 43°38′12″N 94°6′0″W
- Area: 7.5 acres (3.0 ha)
- Built: 1872
- Architect: Rev. Solomon S. Burleson
- Architectural style: Gothic Revival
- MPS: Faribault County MRA
- NRHP reference No.: 80004257
- Added to NRHP: May 23, 1980

Church of the Good Shepherd Episcopal, a notable example of Rural Gothic architecture located at Moore and 8th Streets in Blue Earth, Minnesota, is the oldest surviving church building in the community. As the congregation diminished in the 1970s regular worship services were eventually suspended; in 1981 its three remaining members donated the building to the Faribault County Historical Society. Since then the church has hosted seasonal ecumenical services, Christmas concerts, weddings, and funerals. It was added to the National Register in 1980.

== Establishment of the Parish ==
Blue Earth was established in 1856 and, while most of its early settlers were Methodists, Episcopalians and Presbyterians also arrived from the east. The first Episcopal service in the city was held in the Presbyterian church on December 10, 1867. In 1870 Bishop Henry Whipple asked the Reverend Solomon Stephens Burleson (1833-1897), then the rector of All Saints in Northfield, to visit the city and consider becoming its resident pastor.

On January 14, 1871, the Blue Earth City Post reported that “the question of building an Episcopal Church at this place will be decided during the visit of Bishop Whipple, next week.” During that visit Whipple offered to supply the funds to build the church if the young congregation would pay for the construction of a rectory. This offer was immediately accepted: “Arrangements have been nearly completed for the establishment of regular Episcopal services at this place, the pastorate to be occupied by the Rev. S.S. Burleson. A church parsonage will also be built. Services will be held by Burleson at the school house tomorrow, Sunday, at 10½ o’clock.”

Rev. Solomon Burleson (ca. 1872)

== Founding Donor ==
The land for the church was purchased for $375 (the equivalent of roughly $8,000 in 2020). Within three months of Whipple’s visit, the local newspaper announced that “Plans are being matured for the erection of an Episcopal Church building in Blue Earth City, costing several thousand dollars. The money is already in hand and is the gift of Mrs. Auchmuty, a wealthy New York lady, who is now traveling in Europe.” This benefactress was Ellen Schermerhorn Auchmuty (1837-1927), the independently wealthy wife of Col. Richard T. Auchmuty, who donated the full $3,000 (the equivalent of roughly $64,000 in 2020) for the construction of the church. Both she and her husband came from prominent Episcopalian families; together they offered substantial financial support toward church construction projects on the east coast. Richard Auchmuty was also an architect, and designed St. Mary's Episcopal Church in Brooklyn, New York, and Trinity Episcopal Church in Lenox, Massachusetts, both of which are listed on the National Register of Historic Places; his great-grandfather had also served as the third rector of New York City’s Trinity Church.

== Building Design and Construction ==
In 1871 Blue Earth was still a small prairie community where any major construction project would have been conspicuous. Nonetheless, its residents were routinely kept apprised of the church’s progress in the local press. On August 16, 1871, the Blue Earth City Post reported the groundbreaking, and noted that “the building will be 27x60 feet, facing west with a tower to the southeast corner, and a porch in front ten feet square. It will seat about two hundred persons, and will be warmed with a furnace. The building will be ready for occupancy about Christmas.”

Burleson had overseen the construction of the three churches in Minnesota’s Cannon River Valley where he had served previously, and brought this experience to the design and completion of the Church of the Good Shepherd. He was even known to exchange his vestments for overalls to participate personally in the framing of his churches.” All of these projects were indebted to building plans published by Richard Upjohn in Upjohn’s Rural Architecture: Designs, working drawings and specifications for a wooden church, and other rural structures (1852). Joan Gundersen describes Upjohn’s style, which also characterizes Burleson’s appropriation of it in Blue Earth: “While reflecting trends in Eastern architecture and high church position, the buildings were plain, with little ornamentation except for the vertical lines of board-and-batten exterior, pointed-arch windows and doors, and a plain three-stage tower. The simplicity of the lines reflected both the modest high church position of the Minnesota churches and frontier carpenter skills.” This style eventually became known locally as “Whipple Gothic,” and brought an emphasis on “awe and mystery, tradition and liturgical space [and] stressed the communion service as the center of worship by setting the chancel and altar apart from the congregation.”

While any building derived from Upjohn’s book would inevitably share many design features, it appears that Burleson took pains to distinguish each of his churches in some way. In this case he was also charged with building a second Episcopal church in Faribault County, in Wells, Minnesota; Gundersen notes that “Burleson’s designs for the Church of the Good Shepherd at Blue Earth City and the Church of the Nativity at Wells were near twins and very close to the Upjohn plans, with entryways added at the gable ends to both and buttresses to the building in Blue Earth. As was reported at the time, “the exterior of the church is plain, but tasty and substantial looking of a drab color, with a tall spire surmounted by a cross. It is as fine an edifice of the kind as can be found in this part of the State, and reflects much credit on the pastor, Rev. S.S. Burleson, who has been the architect and builder, and under whose…exceedingly good building arrangement the work has been accomplished.

The Blue Earth City Post published a steady stream of construction updates. On November 4, 1871: “The Episcopal Church building is progressing rapidly. The frame is up and now being enclosed. The roof will be put up next week if the weather will permit.” On November 18, 1871: “One would think by the noise in the Krupp & Pfeffer tin shop that it had been turned into a boiler shop. The workmen have been engaged for some time on a huge heating apparatus for the Episcopal Church which required much riveting, hence the noise.” On December 16, 1871: “Owing to the extremely cold weather, work on the Episcopal Church building has been greatly delayed. It was hoped that the building would be ready for dedication by Christmas, but the date of completion has now been postponed to about the middle of January. The color will be that of Portland Stone with the trimming brown. It is a handsome color and adds much to the attractiveness of the edifice. The building will be warmed by a tubular furnace in the cellar, with a register in each pew which will admit of its being speedily and uniformly heated throughout.” On February 17, 1872: “The Episcopal Church in this village will be known as the Church of the Good Shepherd. [It] is rapidly approaching completion. The carpenters are engaged in putting in the pews.” On March 2, 1872: “There is a fair prospect that the Episcopal Church will be provided with a bell soon. It is proposed to buy a steel composition bell weighing one thousand pounds.” On March 16, 1872: “The Church of the Good Shepherd is in such a state of completeness as to admit of its being used in a short time. The absence of Bishop Whipple, who has gone to Cuba, will delay its consecration for a few weeks.” And, finally, on March 30, 1872: “Next Sunday being Easter Sunday, services will be held in the Church of the Good Shepherd at sunrise, half past ten, and at half past two. A general invitation is extended to the public to attend.”

== Consecration ==
Bishop Whipple returned to Blue Earth to consecrate the church on August 20, 1872.

== Stained Glass ==
At its completion the Church of the Good Shepherd displayed one large lancet window above the altar, with two wooden tablets at either side, and a number of smaller, plain, green and white lancet windows in the bell tower and around the perimeter of the seating area. The window originally installed above the altar was noteworthy. According to the Blue Earth City Post “It was the first one ever brought to Minnesota, having been in use in Christ Church, St. Paul for some years.” The Blue Earth City Mail noted that “the chancel window is of stained glass like the other windows, and has a plain cross in the center.” There was a Christ Church in St. Paul prior to 1860, but it was damaged in a fire; this window apparently survived the flames and was obtained by Burleson, who put an emphasis on including distinctive windows in the churches he built.

While the Church of the Good Shepherd was once the second home to an historically important piece of stained glass, that is not the case today. A decade after it was built the Blue Earth City Post made this announcement: “The Church of the Good Shepherd has received a beautiful new chancel window at a cost of $125 which will be unveiled in about four weeks.” This is the same window you will find in the church today; within a double lancet form it depicts Christ holding one lamb and surrounded by two sheep, with the legend “The good shepherd giveth his life for the sheep.” Here, as a pericope of John 10:14-16, one of the sheep is led by a strip of blue cloth it holds in its mouth – symbolic of the unrestrained free will to believe and follow Christ. While the composition of the image has been altered, this window appears to derive from Bernhard Plockhorst's 1878 painting, "The Good Shepherd," that became widely popular as a print.

Center altar window (ca. 1881).
