= Lake Charles Historic District =

Historic district in Louisiana, United States

- U.S. National Register of Historic Places
- U.S. Historic district
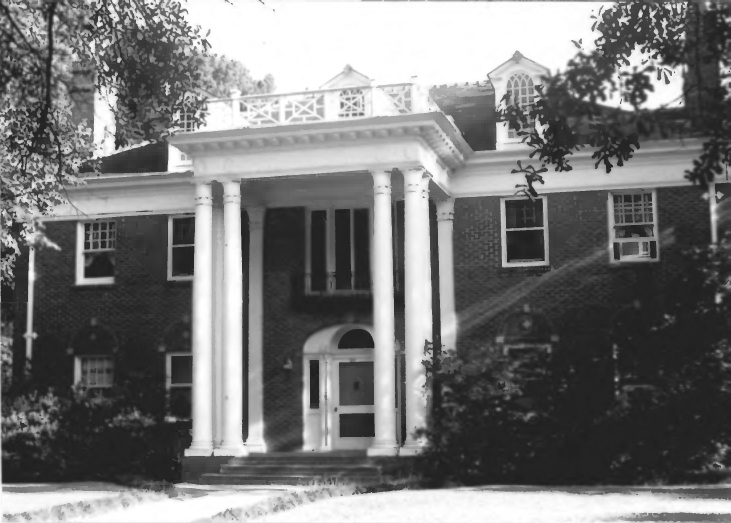

- Location within Louisiana Location within the United States

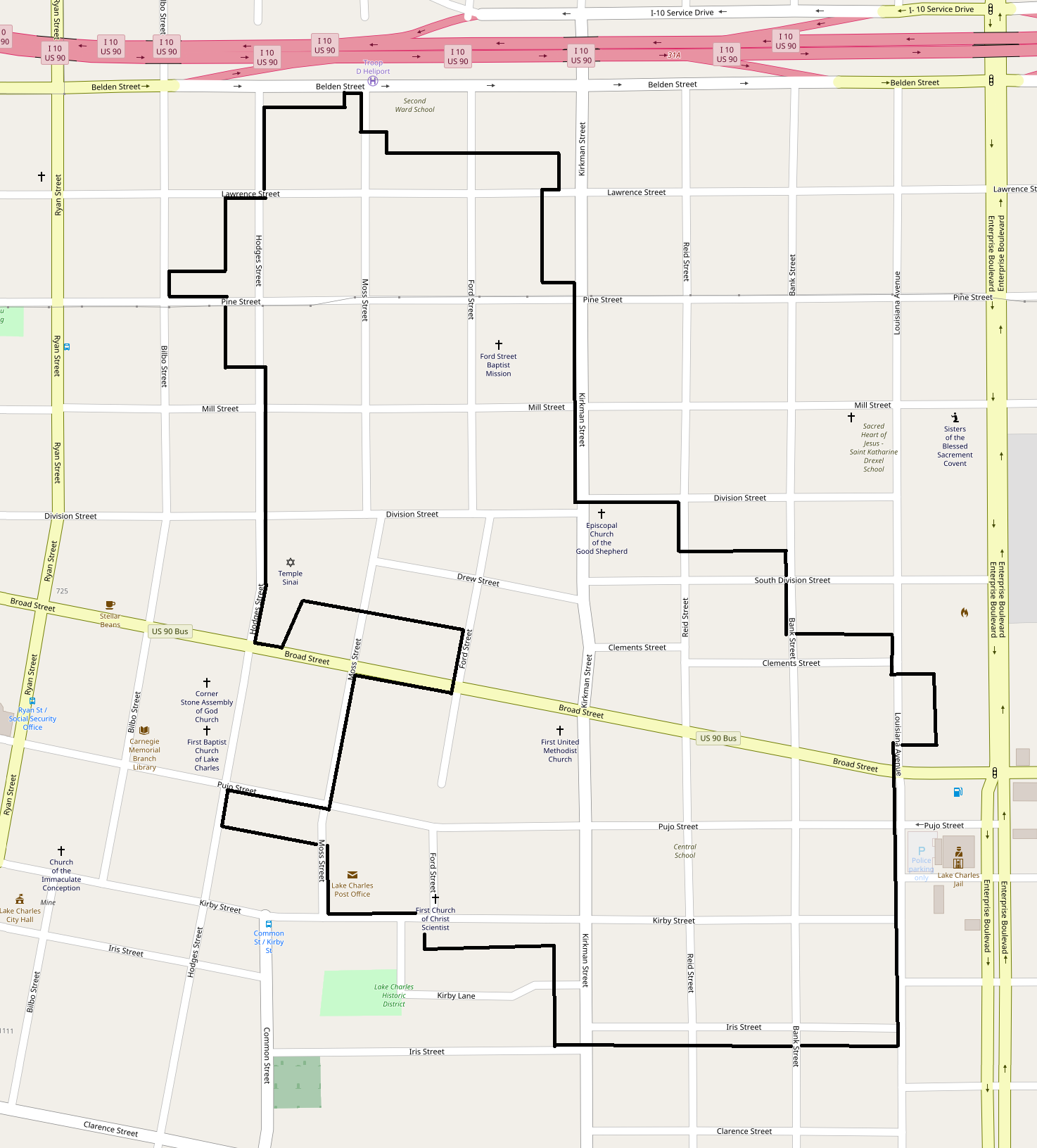
- Location: Roughly bounded by Belden Street, Lawrence Street, Kirkman Street, South Division Street, Louisiana Avenue, Iris Street, and Hodges Street, Lake Charles, Louisiana
- Coordinates: 30°13′42″N 93°12′35″W
- Area: 158 acres (64 ha)
- Built: c.1880 - 1939
- Architect: Favrot & Livaudais; Edward F. Neild
- Architectural style: Colonial Revival, Bungalow/craftsman, Queen Anne Revival;Eastlake
- NRHP reference No.: 90000434
- Added to NRHP: March 16, 1990

The Lake Charles Historic District in Lake Charles, Louisiana was listed on the National Register of Historic Places in 1990. It is locally designated as the Charpentier Historic District. The NRHP district is roughly bounded by Iris, Hodges, Lawrence, Kirkman, S. Division and Louisiana.

The district includes 281 contributing buildings, dating from c.1880 to 1939, on 158 acres (64 ha), comprising works by architects Favrot & Livaudais and Edward F. Neild. It also includes the 1896-built Church of the Good Shepherd, which was separately listed on the NRHP in 1983. Relevant architectural styles inside the district are Colonial Revival, Bungalow/craftsman, Queen Anne Revival and Eastlake.

It was deemed "locally significant in the areas of industry and architecture. It is all that is left to represent the lumber boom prosperity of Lake Charles in the late-nineteenth and early-twentieth centuries. It is architecturally significant as an outstanding collection of historic buildings within the context of southwestern Louisiana. It shares this distinction with two other towns, Crowley and Jennings, and in some respects is superior to both."

== See also ==
- National Register of Historic Places listings in Calcasieu Parish, Louisiana
- Lake Charles, Louisiana
