= Listed buildings in Eastham, Merseyside =

Eastham is a village in Wirral, Merseyside, England. It contains 13 buildings that are recorded in the National Heritage List for England as designated listed buildings, all of which are listed at Grade II. This grade is the lowest of the three gradings given to listed buildings and is applied to "buildings of national importance and special interest". The listed buildings consist of houses, a church and a chapel, a school, a public house at the site of the former Eastham Ferry, a sundial, a village cross, and a war memorial.

Name and location	Photograph	Date	Notes
St Mary's Church; 53.31324°N 2.96152°W		Late 13th to early 14th century	Additions and alterations were made during the following centuries, and the church underwent a major restoration in 1876–77 by David Walker. It is built in stone with tiled roofs, and consists of a nave, aisles, a chancel with a north chapel and a south vestry, and a west steeple. The steeple has buttresses, gabled pinnacles, and a broach spire with lucarnes.
31–35 Stanley Lane; 53.31298°N 2.96312°W	—	1699	A row of three brick houses on a stone base, with a slate roof. They have two storeys and a four-bay front, No. 31 having two bays and a lower roof. No. 35 has stone quoins in the lower floor, and a datestone. The windows and doors date from the 20th century.
Hall Farmhouse; 53.31308°N 2.96197°W		1743	The farmhouse is in brick with stone dressings and a slate roof. It is in three storeys and has a main block of three bays, with an extension of two bays and a rear gabled wing. The windows in the main block are sashes or imitation sashes, and in the extension there is one sash window, the others being casements.
Grove House; 53.31294°N 2.96148°W		18th century	A brick house on a stone base with a slate roof, it has two storeys and three bays, the right bay having been added later. Above the doorway is a blocked fanlight, and the windows are sashes.
Sundial; 53.31309°N 2.96141°W	—	1798	The sundial is in the churchyard of St Mary's Church. It is in stone and consists of a simple baluster on a square base, and it has an octagonal cap. The plate and gnomon are missing.
93 Eastham Village Road; 53.31426°N 2.96044°W		Early 19th century	A stone house with a hipped slate roof, it has two storeys and fronts of two and three bays. The windows are sashes with cusped ogee heads. The entrance has an architrave with anthemions in the angles, and a fanlight.
111 Eastham Village Road; 53.31336°N 2.96013°W		Early 19th century	Originally a lodge, later used as a house, it is in stone with a hipped slate roof, in two storeys and four bays. The central two bays project forward under a pediment and contain a canted porch with two unfluted Doric columns, triangular pilasters, a frieze, and a cornice. The windows are a mixture of sashes and casements.
Eastham Ferry Hotel; 53.32858°N 2.95625°W		1847	A stuccoed public house with a hipped slate roof, in three storeys and five bays. The windows are sashes, those in the top floor having round heads. The central entrance has an architrave with pilasters and a fanlight. To the right is a gate with a wrought iron overthrow.
School and master's house 53.31360°N 2.96143°W	—	1852	The school and former master's house are in stone with a slate roof, and have a front of six bays. The first and second bays and the sixth bay project forward. The sixth bay has two storeys, and the rest of the building is in a single storey. To the right of the second bay is a gabled porch that has an entrance with a pointed head. The windows are mullioned.
Chapel, Carlett Park; 53.32302°N 2.95933°W		1884–85	The chapel was built in the grounds of Carlett Park, a mansion, which has since been demolished and replaced by modern housing. It was designed by John Douglas, and is built in stone with a slate roof. The chapel consists of a continuous nave and chancel, and a transept. At the northwest is an octagonal bell-turret with a spire, and over the entrance is a canopied niche containing a figure of the Good Shepherd.
Village cross 53.31382°N 2.96089°W		1891	The cross is in stone, and consists of a plinth on square steps, with a tapered octagonal chamfered shaft carrying a cross with a central hole and foliate ends. The plinth carries inscriptions and carved shields.
War memorial 53.31391°N 2.96087°W		1924	The war memorial was designed and sculpted by C. J. Allen. It consists of a tapering stele in Hopwood limestone, surmounted by a bronze figure of Christ with a cross nimbus and holding up a crown. The stele carries the name of those lost in both World Wars, and has relief sculptures including a falling soldier, who is looking upwards towards Christ, and who is held by a comrade.
3 Church Lane; 53.31267°N 2.96105°W	—	Undated	A stone house with a tiled roof and a brick chimney stack. It is in a single storey and has three irregular bays, and a gabled rear wing. The windows have pointed arches.
