= Lenox Village Historic District =

Historic district in Massachusetts, United States

- U.S. National Register of Historic Places
- U.S. Historic district
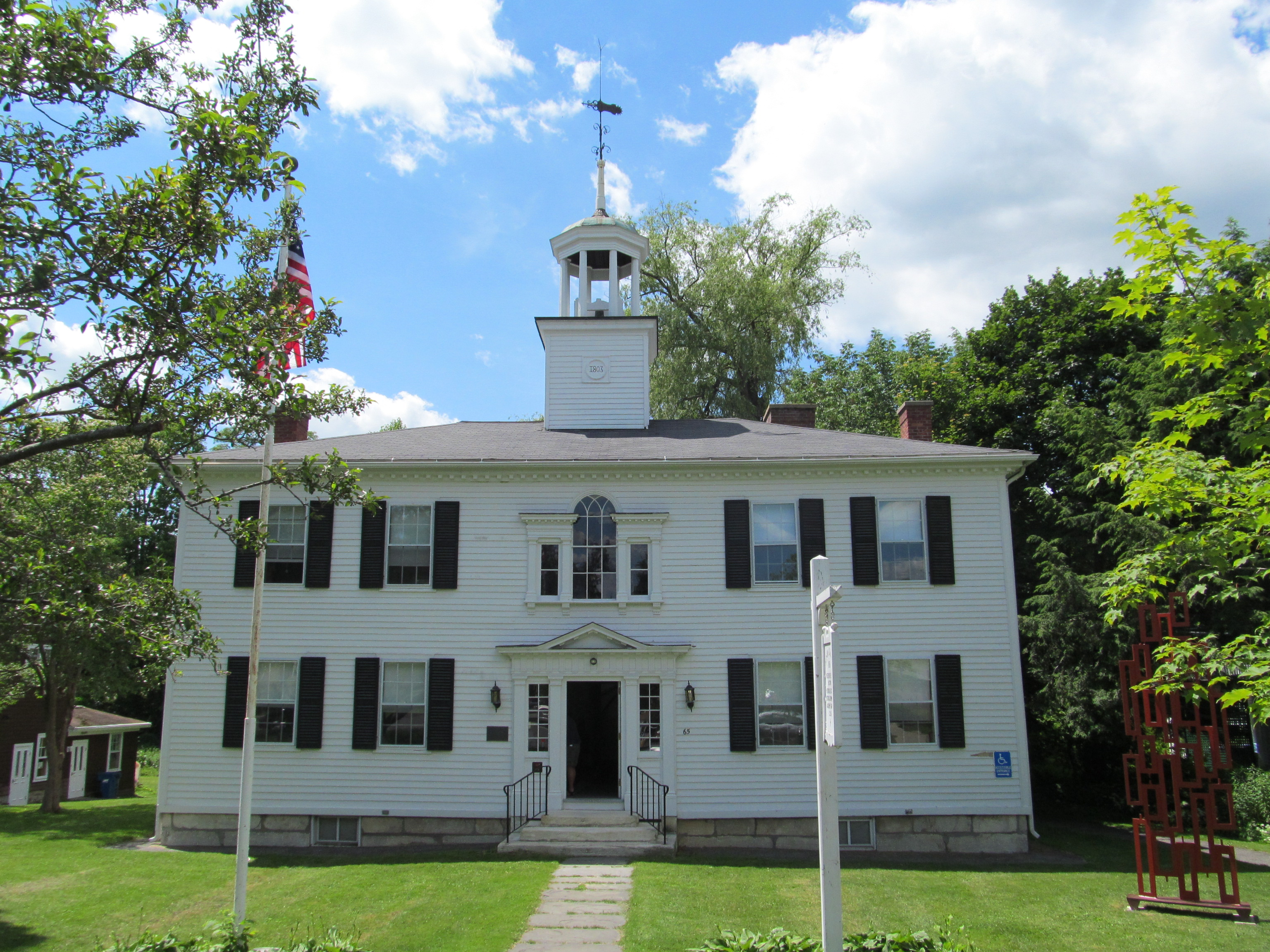
- Lenox Academy

- Location within Massachusetts Location within the United States
- Location: Main, Church, Cliffwood, Franklin, Greenwood, High, Housatonic, Hubbard, Hynes, Kemble, Old Center, Tucker and Walker Sts.; Fairview and St. Ann's Ave.; Old Stockbridge and Ore Bed Rds..; Hillside Dr., Lenox, Massachusetts
- Coordinates: 42°21′28″N 73°16′58″W
- Area: 170 acres (69 ha)
- Built: 1770
- NRHP reference No.: 100006987
- Added to NRHP: June 27, 2022

The Lenox Village Historic District is a historic district encompassing the historic village center of Lenox, Massachusetts. Settled in the 1760s, Lenox was the second county seat of Berkshire County, a role it served until 1868, and its early economic success revolved around this role and local mining industries. The village center is reflective of this early role, as well as its later role as a hub for wealthy vacationers. The district was listed on the National Register of Historic Places in 2022.

== Description and history ==
The Lenox Village Historic District includes substantially all of the main village of Lenox. It is anchored at its south end by the four-way junction of Main Street, West Street, Old Stockbridge Road, and Walker Street, where a cluster of civic buildings are located. Immediately to the north and east are a network of streets where there are purpose-built commercial buildings, and older homes that have mostly been converted to commercial use. The northern end of the district is marked by the Church on the Hill, an 1805 Federal-style edifice built for a congregation founded in 1769.

Lenox was first settled in the early 1760s as part of Richmond, a town that was geographically divided by a substantial ridge. Lenox was incorporated in 1767. Its central location in the county led to its designation as the county seat in 1784. Its original courthouse, finished in 1791, is now a commercial establishment on Housatonic Street. Its second is the front-facing portion of the Lenox Library, also separately listed on the National Register. The outer fringes of the district include larger residential properties, dating to its period as a center for large summer estates in the late 19th and early 20th centuries.

== See also ==
- Lenox Academy: contributing property
- Old Lenox High School building: contributing property
- Trinity Episcopal Church (Lenox, Massachusetts): contributing property
- National Register of Historic Places listings in Berkshire County, Massachusetts
