= Robert Shaw Sturgis Whitman =

Whitman at Trinity Church, Lenox, Massachusetts

Robert Shaw Sturgis Whitman (July 27, 1915 – February 9, 2010) was a priest of the Episcopal Church. He lived, preached and served his congregation at Trinity Church in Lenox, Massachusetts.

== Family ==
Whitman was born in New York City. Both his father and grandfather were prominent New York surgeons. His grandfather, Royal Whitman, invented the mechanism used in the first hip replacement and wrote a pioneering medical textbook on orthopedic surgery that was influential in the field.

== Education ==
After spending his formative years in Manhattan, Whitman went on to study at Harvard University. In what was, at the time, a humiliating turn, he was expelled after his first semester for failing an advanced-level history course he was placed in. He returned to New York and took work as a messenger boy for a carpet company and a Wall Street bank.

It was at a party in New York that Whitman met the then secretary of labor, Frances Perkins. The two became friends and Perkins wound up getting Whitman a job in D.C. at the Department of Labor. Though again, it was a small post as a messenger boy.

Perkins and Whitman stayed in contact and it was after Whitman revealed his interest in the ministry that Perkins encouraged him to follow his interest by attending seminary. Whitman did, going on to graduate from the Berkeley Divinity School in New Haven, Connecticut. Whitman was later quoted as saying, "I guess when I think about it, I’ve been a messenger boy my entire life!"

== Ministry ==
From 1946 to 1949 Whitman served as a chaplain to the U.S. Army in the Philippines before taking a position as associate rector of Bruton Parish Church in Williamsburg, Virginia, where he also served as chaplain to Episcopal students at the College of William and Mary.

The Massachusetts’ Berkshires served as the backdrop for Whitman's substantive ministry. Whitman served as rector of Trinity Episcopal Church in Lenox, Massachusetts for 31 years before retiring on July 27, 1981. He later returned to the ministry, however, as rector of St. Martin's Church in Pittsfield, Massachusetts.

His later years of retirement were spent in Guilford, Connecticut, with his wife, Eleanor English.

== Book ==
In 1998 Whitman completed Beyond Words, a book detailing his thought-provoking views on what he calls "ultimate reality". The book is both a statement of belief and an urging for change. In the work Whitman uses anecdotes from his ministry to explain his method for interpretation; and how this method of interpretation can be used to improve understanding, and improve our lives.
