= Church on the Hill (Lenox, Massachusetts) =

Historic church in Massachusetts, United States

- U.S. National Register of Historic Places
- U.S. Historic district – Contributing property
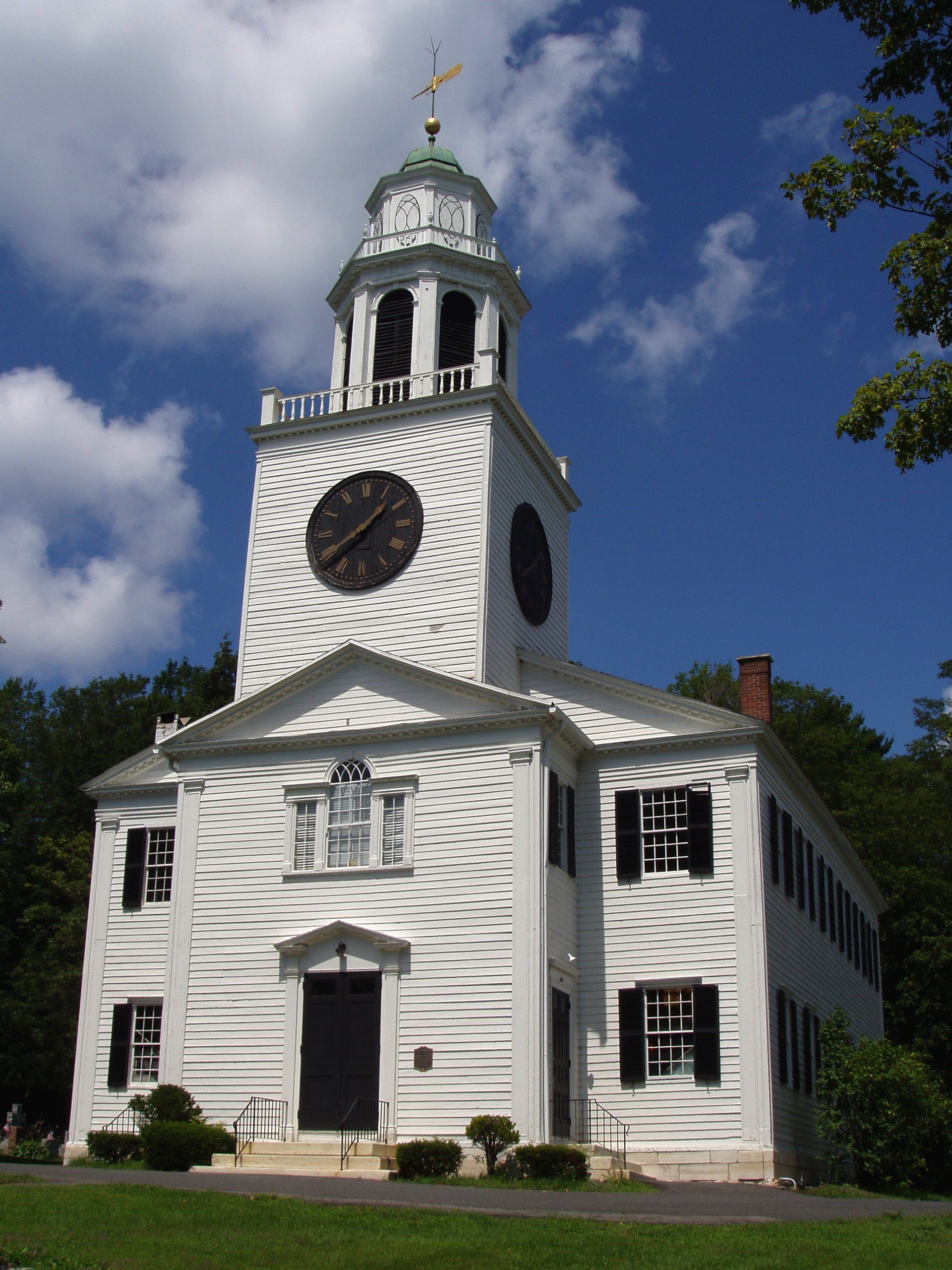
- Church on the Hill
- Location: Main St., Lenox, Massachusetts
- Coordinates: 42°21′49″N 73°17′1″W
- Area: 6 acres (2.4 ha)
- Built: 1805
- Architect: Benjamin Goodrich
- Architectural style: Federal
- Part of: Lenox Village Historic District (ID100006987)
- NRHP reference No.: 82001894

Significant dates
- Added to NRHP: September 30, 1982
- Designated CP: June 27, 2022

The Church on the Hill is a historic church building at 169 Main Street in Lenox, Massachusetts. Built in 1805, it is one of a small number of surviving Federal period churches in the region. Its congregation, gathered in 1769, belongs to the United Church of Christ, and its offices are located at 55 Main Street. The church building was listed on the National Register of Historic Places in 1982.

== Architecture and building history ==
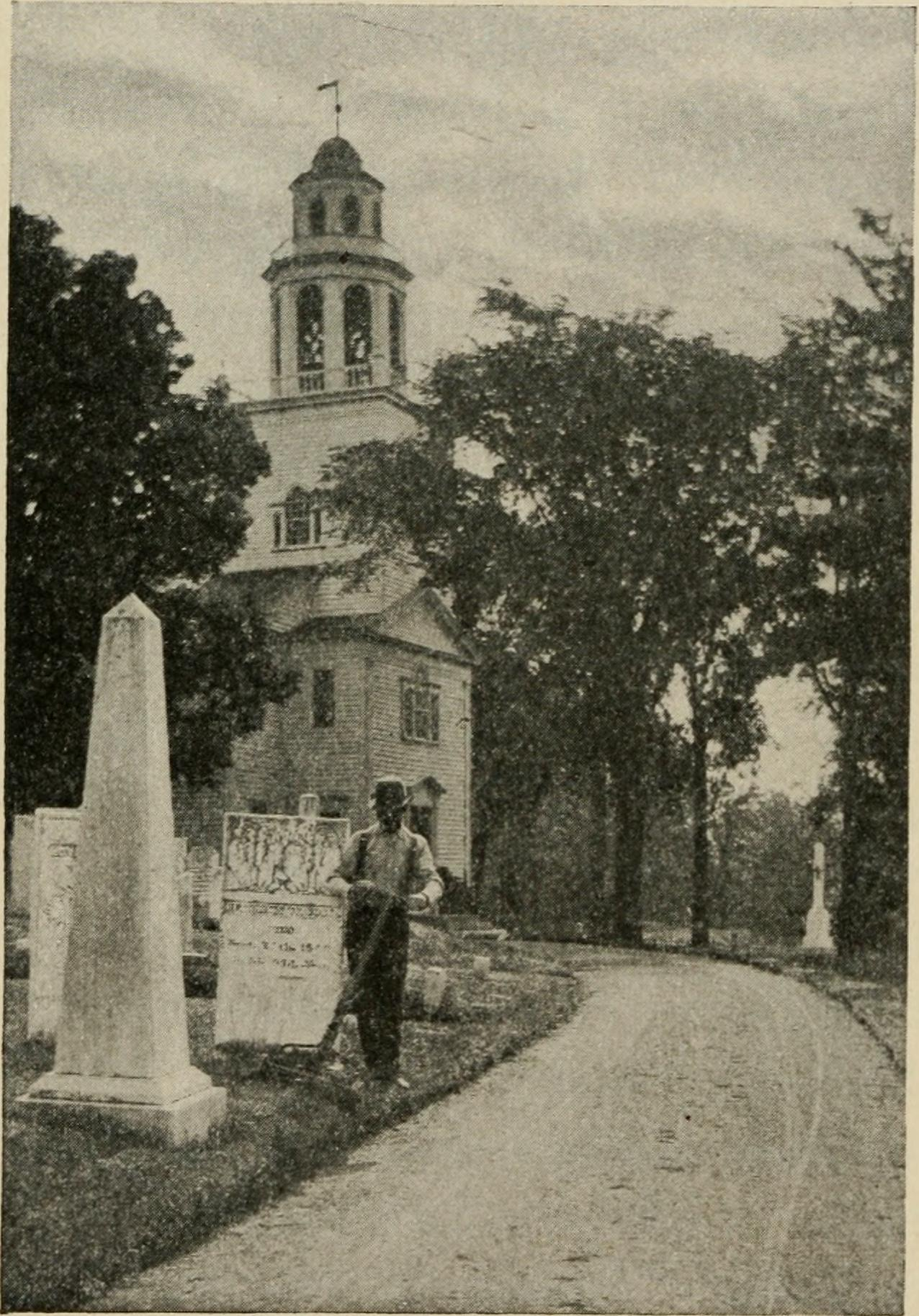
1917 photo by Clifton Johnson.

The church is located on a rise at the northern end of Lenox village, on the west side of Main Street. It stands on a parcel 6 acres (2.4 ha) in size that includes the town's first cemetery. It is a two-story wood-frame structure, with a gabled roof and clapboarded exterior. A gabled entry vestibule projects from the center of the main (south-facing) facade, with the entrance at its center, flanked by pilasters and topped by a gabled pediment. Above the entrance are a Palladian window and a dentillated gable. The building corners have fluted pilasters. A tower rises astride the main block and the vestibule projections, with a square clock-faced stage topped by an open octagonal belfry with paneled pilastered supports. Above the belfry is an octagonal paneled stage which is crowned by a cupola, finial, and cross.

The meetinghouse was built in 1805 by architect and builder Benjamin D. Goodrich of Richmond, based on designs by Asher Benjamin and Charles Bulfinch. It was dedicated on January 1, 1806. Its total cost was $6,619.00 including furnishings. The building was erected on land near the town's first meetinghouse (built 1770), which it replaced.

The current pastor is the Rev. Elizabeth (Liz) R. Goodman.

A painting of the church, by American Impressionist Clark G Voorhees, is in the collection of the Museum of Fine Arts, Houston.

== Ministers ==
- 1770-1793 Rev. Samuel Munson
- 1795-1846 Rev. Samuel Shepard, D.D.
- 1846-1854 Rev. Henry Neill
- 1854-1859 Rev. Edmund K. Alden
- 1860-1865 Rev. Reuben S. Kendall
- 1872-1873 Rev. Samuel H. Tolman
- 1874-1880 Rev. Charles H. Parkhurst
- 1880-1889 Rev. R. DeWitt Mallary
- 1890-1898 Rev. Edward Day
- 1899-1904 Rev. Frederick Lynch
- 1904-1907 Rev. Clayton J. Potter

== See also ==
- National Register of Historic Places listings in Berkshire County, Massachusetts
