= Church of the Good Shepherd (Maitland, Florida) =

Historic church in Florida, US

- U.S. National Register of Historic Places
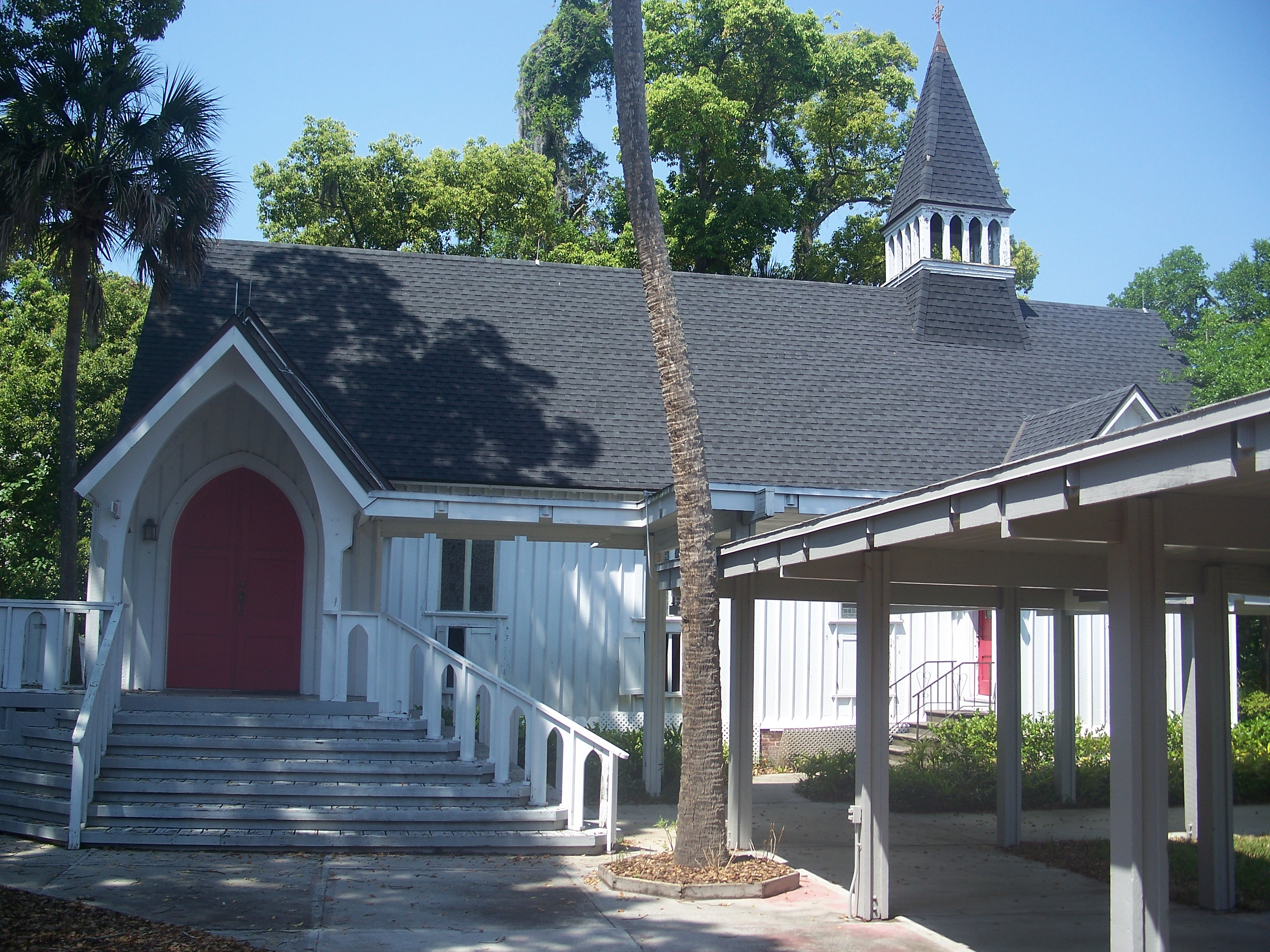
- Location: 331 Lake Ave, Maitland, Florida
- Coordinates: 28.619107°N 81.368426°W
- Built: 1883
- Architect: Charles C. Haight
- Architectural style: Carpenter Gothic
- NRHP reference No.: 11000144
- Added to NRHP: 28 March 2011

The Church of the Good Shepherd built in 1880 is an historic Episcopal church located at 331 Lake Avenue in Maitland, Orange County, Florida. Designed by renowned New York architect Charles C. Haight in the Carpenter Gothic style of architecture, it was built largely through the efforts of the Right Reverend Henry Benjamin Whipple, the first bishop of Minnesota, who began wintering in Maitland in the 1870s. Its board and batten exterior walls and lancet windows are typical of Carpenter Gothic architecture, but its belfry centered over the altar area is unusual. The church was consecrated on March 17, 1883, and Bishop Whipple conducted regular services there each winter for the rest of his life. In 1967, a new modern church designed by Nils M. Schweizer was built to complement the original structure, which since then has served as a chapel. On March 28, 2011, the 1880 church was added to the National Register of Historic Places.

== Current status ==
The Church of the Good Shepherd is an active parish in the Episcopal Diocese of Central Florida. The Rector is Father Nathanael Saint-Pierre.

== See also ==
- Church of the Good Shepherd (disambiguation)
