= Chapel of the Good Shepherd, Carlett Park =

Coordinates: 53.3230°N 2.9593°W

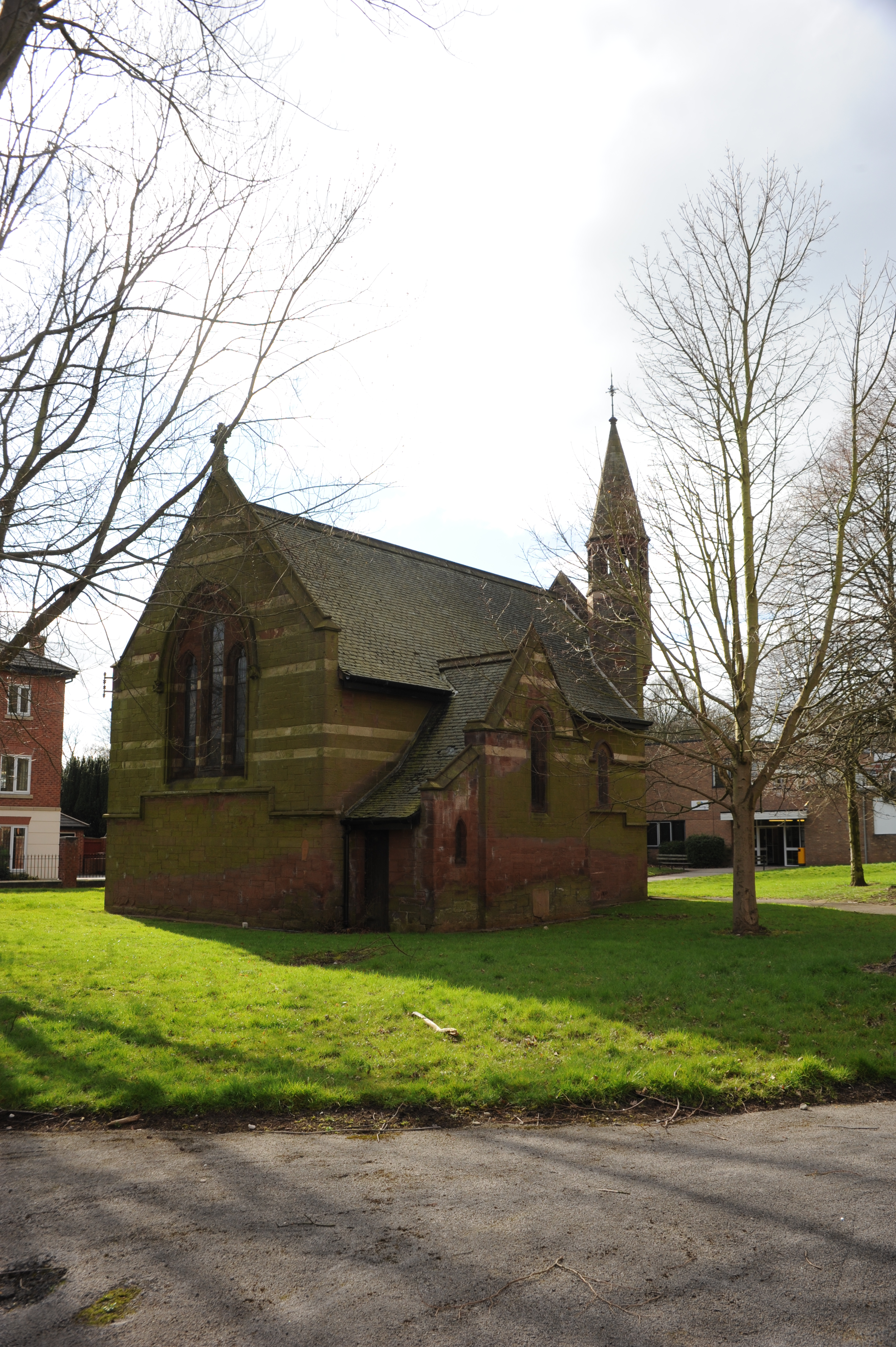

- Location in Merseyside
- OS grid reference: SJ 361 811
- Location: Eastham, Merseyside
- Country: England
- Denomination: Anglican

History
- Dedication: Good Shepherd

Architecture
- Heritage designation: Grade II
- Designated: 2 December 1986
- Architect: John Douglas
- Architectural type: Chapel
- Style: Gothic Revival
- Groundbreaking: 1884
- Completed: 1885

Specifications
- Materials: Red sandstone with lighter stone bands, slate roof

The Chapel of the Good Shepherd, Carlett Park is in Eastham, Merseyside, England. It is recorded in the National Heritage List for England as a designated Grade II listed building.

== History ==
The chapel was built in the grounds of the mansion in Carlett Park in 1884–85 to a design by the Chester architect John Douglas. The chapel was commissioned by the owner of the mansion, Revd W. E. Torr, who was a canon of Chester Cathedral and the vicar of Eastham.

== Architecture ==
The chapel is built in red sandstone. It has bands of lighter stone and a slate roof. Its plan consists of a continuous nave and chancel with a north transept. At the northwest is an octagonal bell-turret with a spire. Over the entrance is a canopied niche containing a figure of the Good Shepherd. The windows are lancets and the interior has ashlar stone. The windows contain stained glass by Kempe and by E. Frampton. Internally, framing the east window, are mosaic panels.

== See also ==
- Listed buildings in Eastham, Merseyside
- List of new churches by John Douglas
