= St Mary's Church, Eastham =

Coordinates: 53.3132°N 2.9614°W

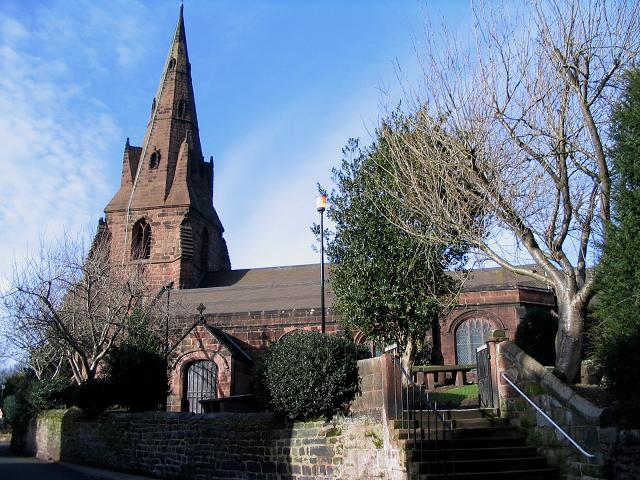
- St Mary's Church, Eastham, from the southeast

- Location in Merseyside
- OS grid reference: SJ 361 800
- Location: Eastham, Wirral, Merseyside
- Country: England
- Denomination: Anglican
- Churchmanship: Broad church
- Website: Eastham, St Mary

History
- Status: Parish church
- Dedication: Virgin Mary

Architecture
- Functional status: Active
- Heritage designation: Grade II
- Designated: 27 December 1962
- Architect(s): David Walker; John Douglas
- Architectural type: Church
- Style: Gothic, Gothic Revival
- Completed: 1880

Specifications
- Materials: Stone with tiled roofs

Administration
- Province: York
- Diocese: Chester
- Archdeaconry: Chester
- Deanery: Wirral South
- Parish: Eastham

Clergy
- Vicar: Revd Elisabeth Ann Glover

St Mary's Church is in the village of Eastham, Wirral, Merseyside, England. It is recorded in the National Heritage List for England as a designated Grade II listed building. It is an active Anglican parish church in the diocese of Chester, the archdeaconry of Chester and the deanery of Wirral South.

== History ==
A place of worship has been here since before the time of the Domesday Book, which mentions a priest at Eastham. The present church contains architecture from many periods, although a major restoration by David Walker took place between 1876 and 1880. Some of the masonry in the north wall dates from the 12th century. The nave dates mainly from the 13th century, the tower originated in the 14th century, and the aisles in the 15th century. The south porch dates from the 16th century. The tower was rebuilt in 1752, and the chancel was restored in 1863–64 by the Chester architect John Douglas.

== Architecture ==
=== Exterior ===
The church is built in stone with tiled roofs. Its plan consists of a tower at the west end with a small vestry to its south, a four-bay nave, north and south wide aisles, a south porch, and a chancel with the Stanley chapel to its north and a vestry to its south. The Stanley chapel is Perpendicular in style, as is the south porch. The tower has a broach spire with unusual gable pinnacles and three tiers of lucarnes.

=== Interior ===
The base of the tower is used as a baptistry and contains a circular 12th century Norman font. At the east end of the south aisle is late 16th century oaken parish chest at least 9 feet (3 m) in length. The Stanley chapel contains two altar tombs. One is in alabaster and is to the memory of Charlotte, Lady Stanley, who died in 1662, and the other is in sandstone and commemorates Sir William Stanley who died in 1612. Other memorials in the church are to Sir Rowland Stanley who died in 1613, Lady Haggerston who died in 1836, and Sir Thomas Stanley Massey Stanley who died in 1841. The north aisle contains the Royal arms of George III and a benefaction board dated 1709. Three carved heraldic panels of the Poole family are incorporated in the organ case. The stained glass in the south window and dormer windows is by E. Frampton and is dated 1888 and 1890. Also in the church is stained glass by Kempe dating between 1889 and 1903. There is a ring of six bells cast in 1922 by John Taylor and Company. The parish registers begin in 1598.

== External features ==
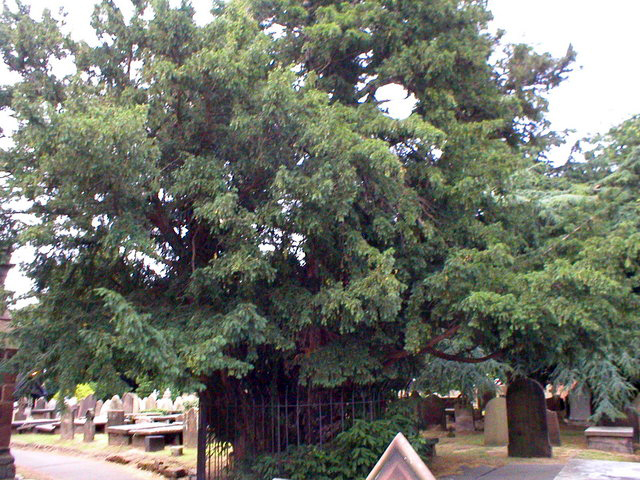
Yew tree in churchyard

In the churchyard is a sundial dated 1798. It is listed at Grade II. Also in the churchyard is an ancient yew tree which was reported to have been in existence in 1152. In addition the churchyard contains the war graves of fourteen service personnel of World War I, and a Merchant Navy officer of World War II.

== See also ==
- Listed buildings in Eastham, Merseyside
- List of church restorations, amendments and furniture by John Douglas
