= Eastham Country Park =

Country park in Eastham, Merseyside, England

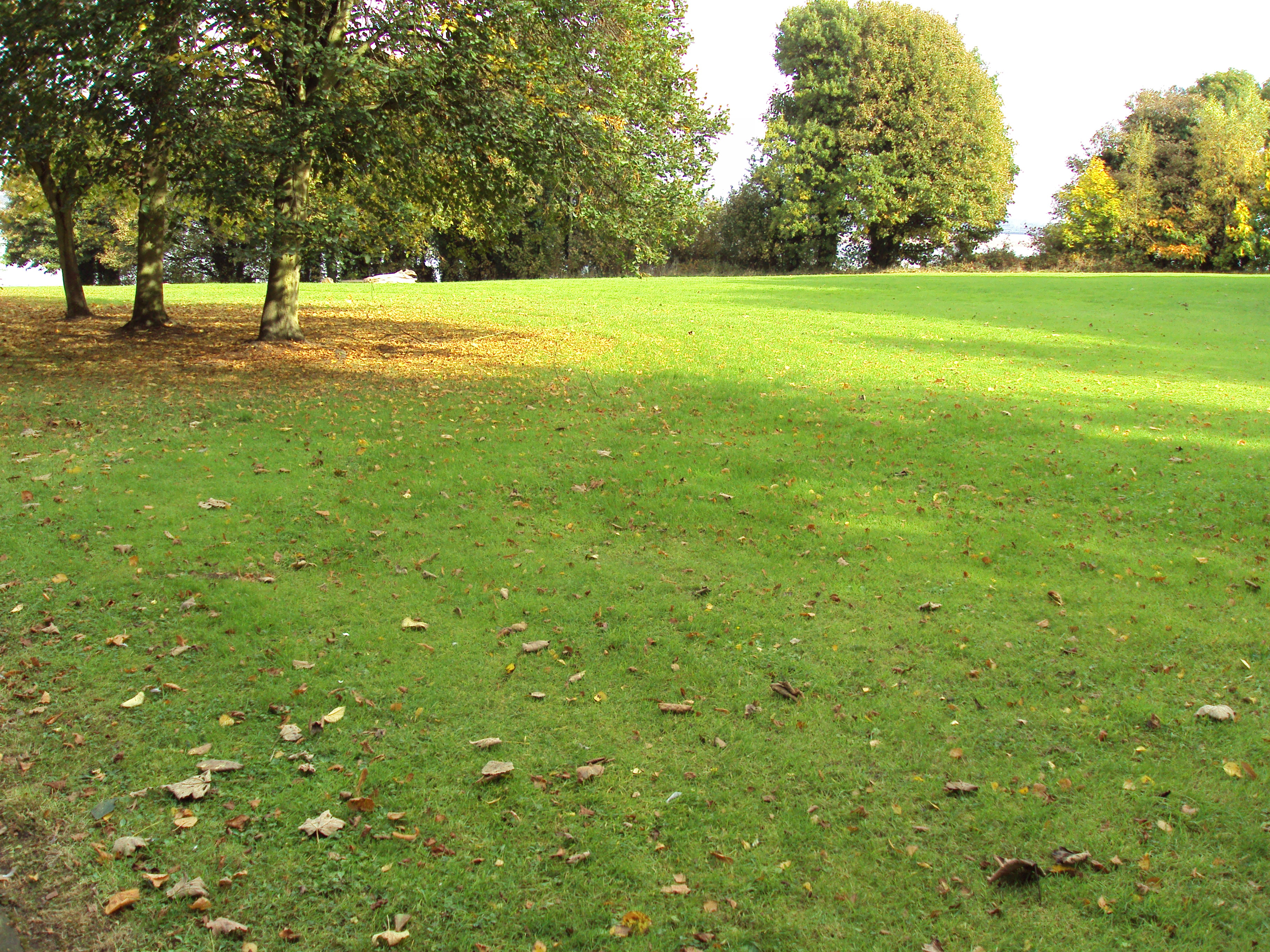
- Eastham Country Park
- Interactive map of Eastham Country Park
- Type: Public park
- Location: Eastham, Merseyside
- Coordinates: 53.3292°N 2.9585°W
- Area: 100 acres (40 ha)
- Created: 1973
- Operator: Metropolitan Borough of Wirral
- Open: All year
- Status: Open

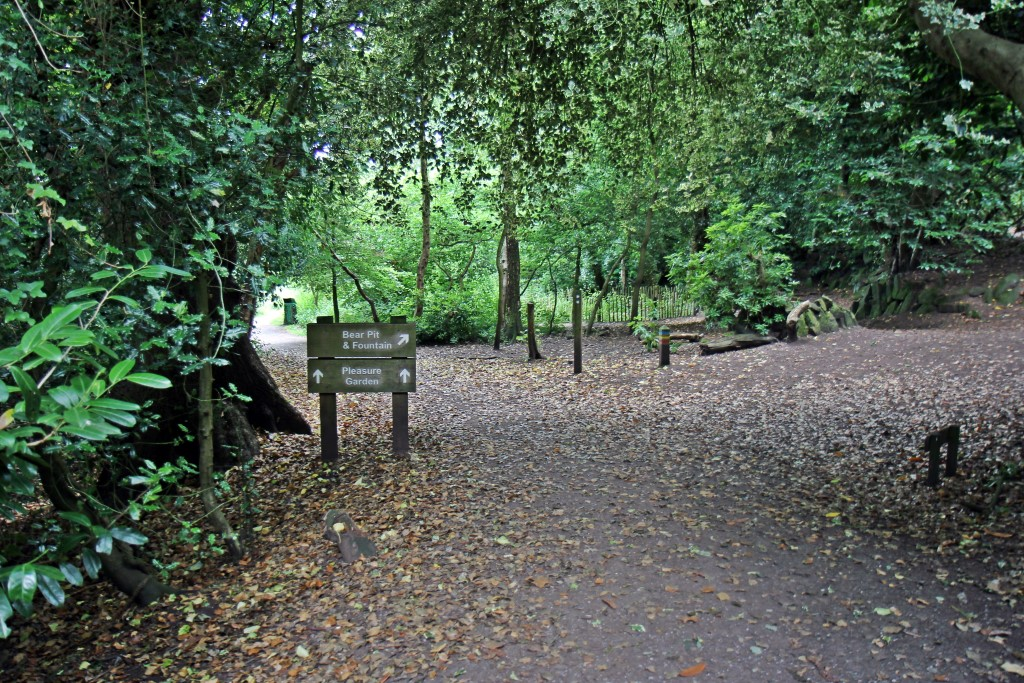
The path to the pleasure garden and bear pit

Eastham Country Park (or Eastham Ferry) is a country park located in Eastham, Wirral. The park is situated next to the River Mersey and covers an area of 100 acres (40 ha). Facilities at the park include a visitor information centre, tea garden and picnic areas. There are two jetties that were formerly used to ferry people and goods from Wirral to Liverpool with the road leading to the park called 'Ferry Road.'

== History ==
The site was originally used as a ferry for travel between Eastham and Liverpool. There are two jetties the first "Eastham Ferry Jetty" is a landmark offering views of the River Mersey. The second "Job's Ferry" was used for commercial traffic and is currently inaccessible for safety reasons. The ferry service is permanently closed. The development of the area before it became a country park is linked to the Eastham Ferry giving access from Liverpool, and the associated Eastham Ferry hotel with its pleasure gardens.

In June 1844 the new Eastham Hotel was opened, "near the site of the old hotel". "The beautiful and capacious gardens attached to the hotel, are still open to the public, and a band has been engaged to play on the lawn from Three until Eight in the evening." In July 1844 the first Eastham regatta was held. The event was very well attended, though marred by a fatality in the rowing races when a boat was swamped. In 1846, the area was further landscaped with gardens, and visitors were encouraged by reduced fares of fourpence (each way) for the four ferries a day from George's Pier, Liverpool. The driving force for the development was Mr Henry Nicholl who held the lease of the hotel and ferry, and had purchased the paddle steamer River Tar for the ferry service. In the 1847 season the fare was reduced to threepence and an extra paddle steamer, the Clyde-built Clarence, was added so that hourly trips were possible. In 1861 the Eastham Ferry service was provided by two new paddle steamers, Eastham Fairy and Swiftsure, which were joined in 1863 by the 142 foot paddle steamer the Richmond, down from Scotland. A zoological collection was added for the 1874 season as a visitor attraction, which included a bear pit, monkey enclosures, aviary with an eagle and black swan, a camel, and a lions' den. For Whit Week 1883 a special attraction was daily displays by Blondin on the high wire. Unfortunately the building of the Manchester Ship Canal turned the area into somewhere more industrial and less idyllic, and by 1893 it was said that "some of the glories of the place have departed", "though the glorious woods still remain" and this was followed in May 1895 by the death of Thomas William Thompson, the owner and driving force behind the gardens.

Eastham Ferry Hotel and Pleasure Gardens were formally re-opened on 19 June 1897, having apparently fallen into decay in the preceding years. The refurbished facilities included a 40 foot high triumphal arch over the entrance, the former monkey-house had been changed into a bandstand, and a large hall, which they called the Victoria Palace, had been added which could seat 3000 or 4000 people. Three new paddle steamers were built by Messrs John Jones & Sons of Liverpool, to ferry people to and from Liverpool. The Ruby and Pearl were built in 1897 and the Sapphire in 1898 (which was slightly larger than the other two).

Although the zoological park had gone, other attractions were added, and in 1898 a "combined switchback and water railway" was added (a.k.a. water chute), and in 1904 they advertised a ride on what we now call a roller coaster in a 4-person car which did a loop the loop. In addition there were numerous entertainers, trapeze artists, acrobats, high wire acts, etc. The roller coaster was put up for sale by the operators Whirling Limited, at the end of the 1905 season, where it was described as "substantially timber-built, and includes a loop about 50ft high, elevated station house, track of about 300yds, together with four iron-built cars, a Crosby's 15HP oil engine, &c". The whole was for sale as a result of a court order along with the lease of the ground and goodwill with possession on completion A buyer must have been found as the topsy turvy railway was still being advertised at Eastham Gardens in 1906.

Eastham Pleasure Gardens were offered for sale by the receiver in March 1910, the lot comprising the gardens and woods, the Ferry Hotel, The Tap public house, the ferry rights, the paddle steamers Ruby and Pearl, the coal hulk Onyx, and in a separate lot the steamer Sapphire. Although no bids were received, private negotiations were reported to be on-going, and in the 1913 season it opened under "entirely new ownership". The adverts from that time onwards suggest the indoor rifle range, bowling and dancing in the pavilion (formerly called the Victoria Palace) were the main activities.

The jetty for the Eastham Ferry was demolished at the end of 1934, the regular ferry service had been discontinued in 1929, and the ferry's paddle steamers (Pearl, Ruby and Sapphire) were broken up. The triumphal arch at the entrance to Eastham Gardens - which imitated Marble Arch in London - was dismantled in March 1935. It was constructed mainly in timber, and Bebington Urban District Council had decided that it had become dangerous. The ballroom (also referred to as the pavilion and Victoria Palace) was destroyed by fire on 25 February 1958. Described as 200 feet square, it has been out of use for many years and at the time was being used as a storeroom for drums and casks. In the early 1960s the tea rooms were removed, and in 1965 the 44 bus service to Eastham Ferry was terminated at Eastham village.

In 1970 the Countryside Commission agreed in principle to the creation of a country park at Eastham Woods and recommended that a grant be made towards the costs. Although planned for demolition as part of the work, the old Ferry Ticket Office - at the time being used as a public convenience - was saved after appeals by various parties. In early 1973 the 44 Bus Service to Eastham Ferry was restored. Eastham Country Park was officially opened on 10 July 1973 by the Mayor and Mayoress of Bebington, who walked the nature trail and unveiled a bronze plaque.

== Facilities ==
The park has a visitor centre with a ranger's service and dedicated bird watching room, trails through the woodland, bridleways, a children's play area, toilets, cafes, barbeque areas, paid car parking, seating, a sculpture trail, a dog play area and views of the river Mersey and Liverpool. The old ferry ticket office has been converted into a refreshment kiosk.

The trails through the woodland reveal overgrown stone walls, raised platforms, the bear pit, disused fountains and in places concrete foundations giving tantalising clues to the complex past of this fascinating location. Information boards scattered through the woodland fill in some of the details.

== Flora and fauna ==
The park is important for wading birds and wildfowl during the winter. Gull species are also present. Other birds common to the park include the blackbird, blue and great tit, chaffinch, collared dove, magpie, robin, thrush, wood pigeon, treecreeper, nuthatch, and wren. Grey squirrels are easily visible around the park. The park contains a 500 year old oak tree.
