= Lenox Library (Massachusetts) =

- U.S. National Register of Historic Places
- U.S. Historic district – Contributing property
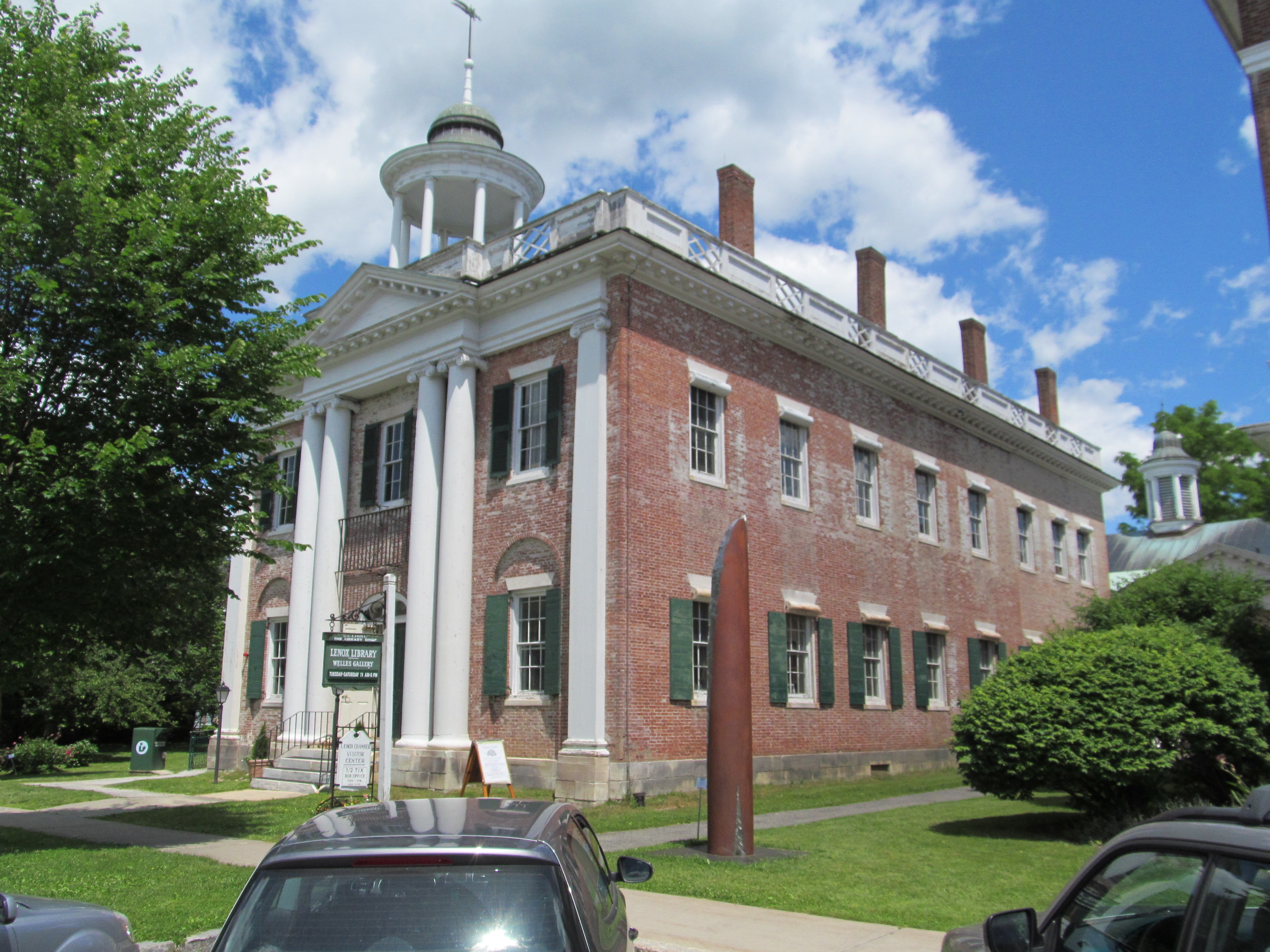
- Lenox Library

- Location within Massachusetts Location within the United States
- Location: 18 Main St., Lenox, Massachusetts
- Coordinates: 42°21′27″N 73°17′6″W
- Area: less than one acre
- Built: 1815-1816
- Architect: Isaac Damon
- Part of: Lenox Village Historic District (ID100006987)
- NRHP reference No.: 73000291

Significant dates
- Added to NRHP: April 3, 1973
- Designated CP: June 27, 2022

The Lenox Library is a municipal public library in Lenox, Massachusetts. It was managed by the non-profit Lenox Library Association, founded in 1856, until it became a department of the Town of Lenox in 2018. The town-owned historic library building is located at 18 Main Street, in the former Berkshire County Courthouse that is listed on the National Register of Historic Places.

== Library History ==
The library was incorporated in 1856 and in 1874 moved into its current home, the former Berkshire County courthouse which was constructed in 1815–1816. In 1973, the building was added to the National Register of Historic Places and is one of several such locations in Lenox. In the early 20th century, novelist Edith Wharton worked in the library and befriended Kate Spencer, who served as partial inspiration for her 1911 novel Ethan Frome.

The Lenox Library belongs to the C/W MARS library consortium, which allows patrons to request books and other materials from other libraries located across the state. The Lenox Library is also a member of the Massachusetts Library System which is a State-supported collaborative that provides leadership and services to foster cooperation, communication, and sharing among member libraries of all types.

In fiscal year 2008, the town of Lenox spent 1.56% ($241,452) of its budget on its public library—some $47 per person.

== Building architecture and history ==
The Lenox Library building occupies a prominent site in downtown Lenox, on the east side of Main Street between Walker and Housatonic Streets. It is a 2 1/2-story masonry structure, built out of brick with stone and wooden trim. Its front facade is dominated by monumental two-story pillars and pilasters, which articulate the three bays. The main entrance is in the center bay, topped by a segmented-arch transom window. The building cornice is studded with modillion blocks, as is the gable supported by the pillars above the entrance. The hip roof is encircled by a lower balustrade, and is crowned by an open belfry and cupola. A substantially larger addition, made in 1889, extends to the rear of the building; it is also topped by a hip roof with cupola.

The main block was built in 1815–16 to a design by Isaac Damon of Northampton, and served as the Berkshire County Courthouse until 1869, when that function was moved to Pittsfield. Although the library moved into the building in 1874, it did not fully occupy the premises immediately. Additional tenants during the late 19th century included the offices of lawyers and politicians, and the town's first telephone exchange. The rear addition, known as Sedgwick Hall, was the scene of social events, lectures, and concerts.

== Notable library collections ==
The Lenox Library houses a number of notable special collections, many of which have a connection to Lenox in some manner. These collections are housed in a variety of locations within Lenox Library.

One of these collections is the Tanglewood Papers, which include historical documents on the history of the Berkshire Symphonic Festival and the Berkshire Music Center before Tanglewood, as well as the founding of Tanglewood and the building of its music pavilion, “The Shed.” The Tanglewood Papers are from the estate of a well-known summer resident, Gertrude Robinson Smith, whose fundraising efforts resulted in construction of “The Shed.” The collection is currently housed in the Keator Vault. The Keator Vault contains local historic items, unique photographs, and functions as temperature controlled preservation archive for rare materials. The Special Collections Vault is sponsored by Mr. & Mrs. Matthew D.M. Keator Family in memory and honor of the Keator and Piretti Families. Very little of the collection has been digitized. A few items were sampled from the collection for the Digital Commonwealth Collection through Boston Public Library. They can be located there by searching for "Tanglewood". They are also located in the Digital Library of America. The biggest users of the music collection at the Lenox Library are the Boston University Tanglewood Institute students. The second largest users of the collection are concertgoers want to preview a specific music selection before attending the concert.

Another notable collection is the Edwin Hale Lincoln Photography Collection. This collection, housed in the Keator Vault, "consists of 745 original glass plate and film negatives of the Berkshire estates, as well as a complete set of study prints. In addition, the Library has one of the few remaining sets of Wild Flowers of New England." Edwin Hale Lincoln, a Massachusetts native, joined the photography business in the late 1800s, shooting a variety of subjects, including Rhode Island yachts, estates in Lenox, flowers native to New England, and other flora.

The Elizabeth MacKinstry Collection, housed in the Legacy Room, is a collection "of illustrated children’s books of the 18th, 19th and early 20th centuries [which] include items of British or continental origin." MacKinstry (1879-1956) was a female children's author and illustrator, and this collection includes books penned by MacKinstry herself, as well as books by some of her favourite authors (Randolph Caldecott, Walter Crane, and Claud Lovat Fraser). The Legacy Room has beautiful French doors and windows houses the Berkshire Author Collection and the MacKinstry Illustrator Collection. This space serves as a reading room for patrons or a meeting room for small groups. The Legacy Room is a gift of Legacy Bank (now Berkshire Bank).

== Roche Reading Park ==
Next to the Lenox library is a park in the center of town named Roche Reading Park after William D. Roche, a long-time treasurer of the Lenox Library. This space has held events such as the Annual Rhubarb Festival and Terry a la Berry concerts. In the summer the Lenox Farmers Market takes place near the park typically between the end of May through September.

== Other information about the Lenox Library ==
The library has public internet workstations, a children's reading room, a larger reading room titled the Sedgwick Reading Room as well as a multi-purpose gallery space named the Welles Galley for patrons to utilize.

== See also ==
- National Register of Historic Places listings in Berkshire County, Massachusetts
