= Richard T. Auchmuty =

American architect

Richard Tylden Auchmuty (July 15, 1831 – July 18, 1893) was an officer in the American Civil War, an architect, and philanthropist. His works were built in New York City and Massachusetts. He designed St. Mary's Episcopal Church at 230 Classon Avenue in Brooklyn and Trinity Episcopal Church at 102 Walker Street in Lenox, Massachusetts, both of which are listed on the National Register of Historic Places. His grandfather signed the Declaration of Independence. He worked for and then in partnership with James Renwick.

He served in the Fifth Corps and climbed in rank to retire a Lieutenant Colonel. According to a letter he wrote he served at Gettysburg.

Auchmuty was born in New York City, the only son of a prominent family. He was philanthropic.

A volume of his Civil War letters was published privately.

Auchmuty died of pulmonary edema at home in Lenox, Massachusetts, on July 18, 1893. His leg was buried first and then he followed several months after at Green-Wood Cemetery.

== Work ==
- The Dormers, his home, in Lenox
- St. Mary's Episcopal Church (Brooklyn)
- Trinity Episcopal Church (Lenox, Massachusetts)
