= Church of the Good Shepherd (Thomasville, Georgia) =

Historic church in Georgia, United States

- U.S. National Register of Historic Places
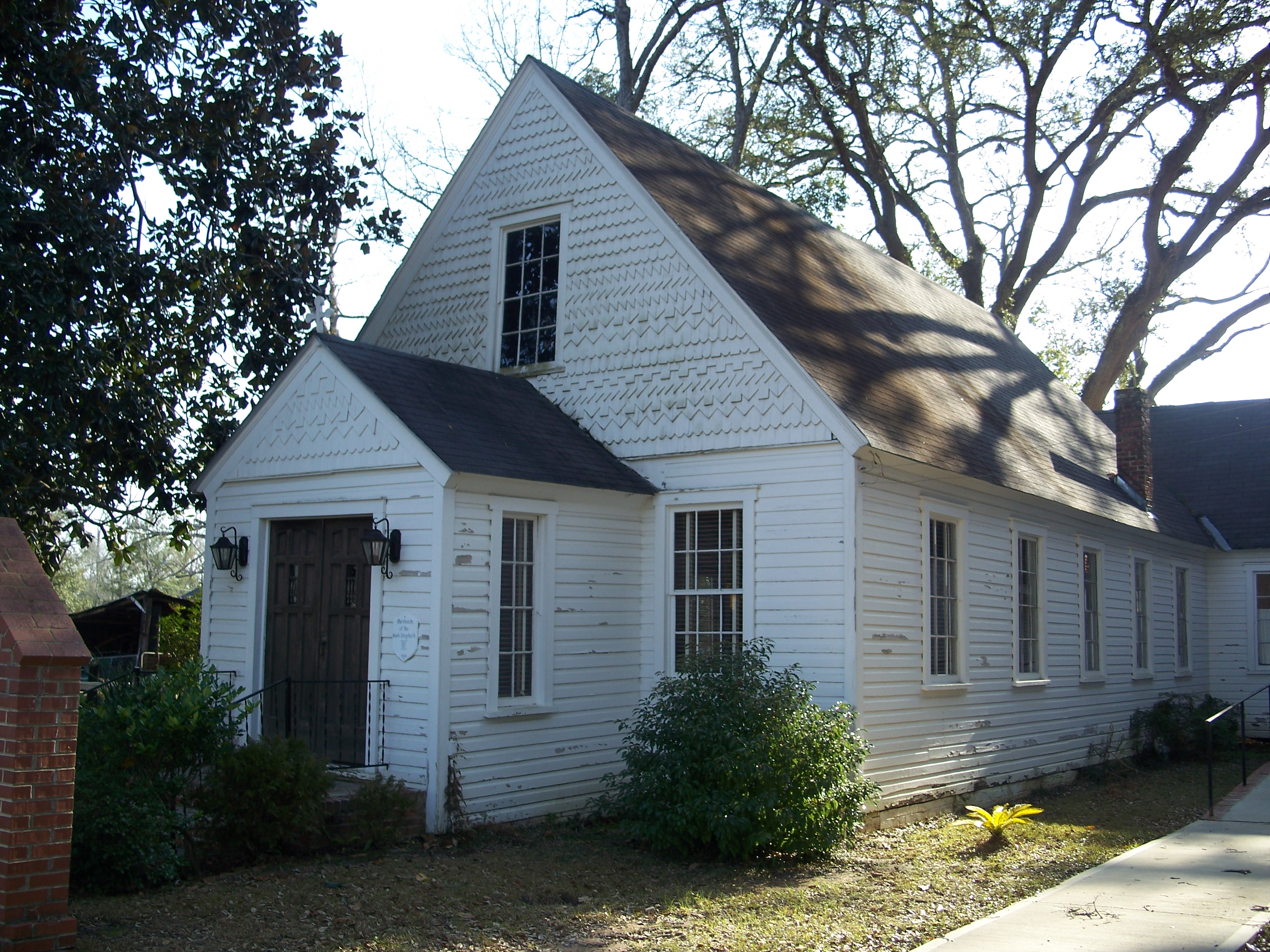

- Location within Georgia Location within the United States
- Location: 511-519 Oak St., Thomasville, Georgia
- Coordinates: 30.839444°N 83.988056°W
- Area: less than one acre
- Built: 1894 (church); 1896, 1907-1912, 1923 (parish hall); 1908 (vicarage)
- Architectural style: Late Victorian, Late-Victorian vernacular
- NRHP reference No.: 86003581
- Added to NRHP: February 5, 1987

The Church of the Good Shepherd, on Oak Street in Thomasville, Georgia, dates from 1908. It was listed on the National Register of Historic Places in 1987.

The listing included three contributing buildings: the church (1894) and a parish hall that form a U-shaped complex, plus a vicarage (1908). The parish hall was built in 1896 and modified in 1907-1912 and in 1923.
