= Eastham, Merseyside =

Coordinates: 53.313°N 2.962°W

Eastham
- Village
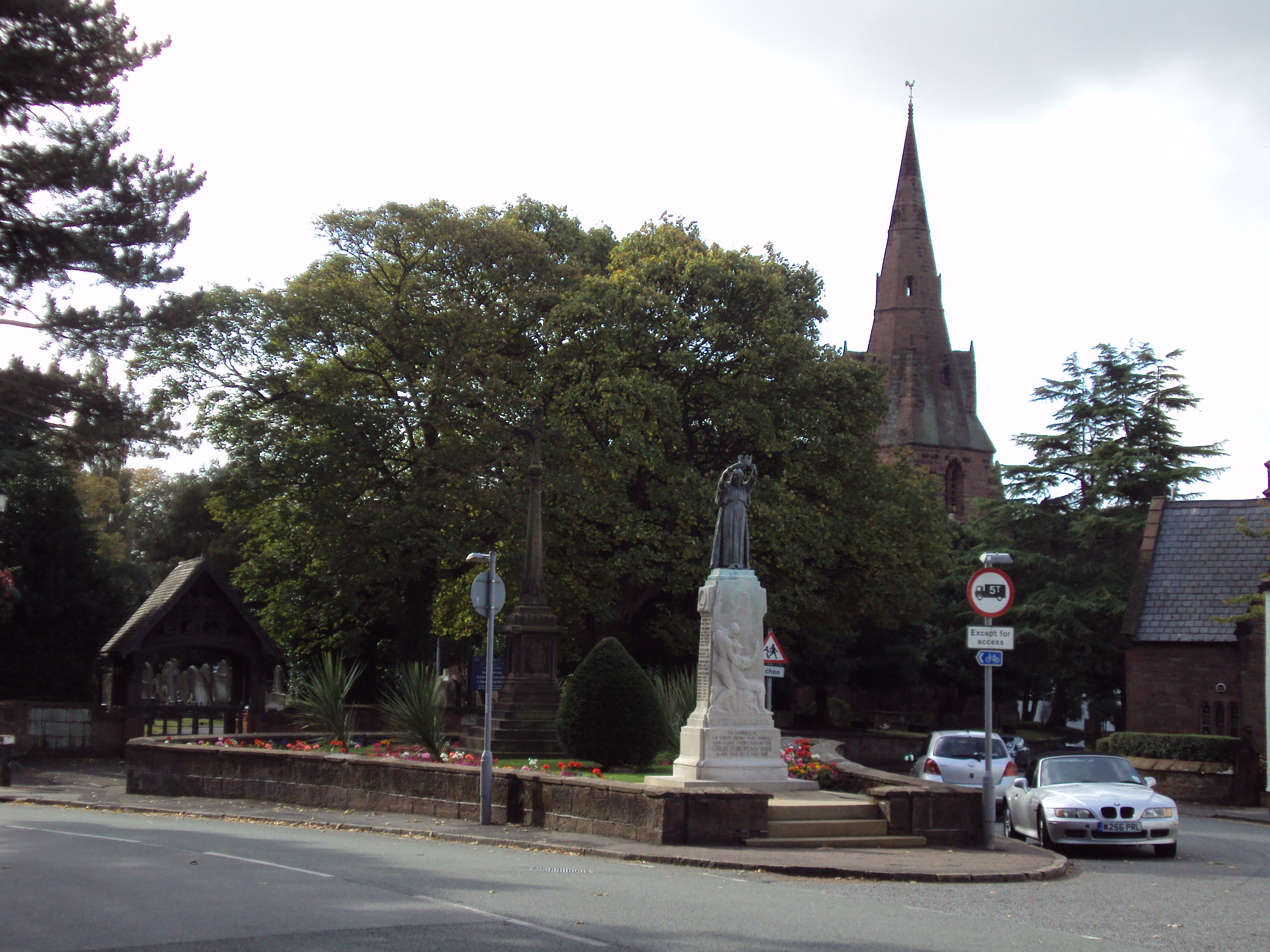
- The memorial garden in Eastham Village, with St Mary's Church in the background

- Location within Merseyside
- Population: 13,882 (2011 census)
- OS grid reference: SJ358805
  - London: 173 mi (278 km) SE
- Metropolitan borough: Wirral
- Metropolitan county: Merseyside
- Region: North West
- Country: England
- Sovereign state: United Kingdom
- Post town: WIRRAL
- Postcode district: CH62
- Dialling code: 0151
- ISO 3166 code: GB-WRL
- Police: Merseyside
- Fire: Merseyside
- Ambulance: North West
- UK Parliament: Ellesmere Port and Bromborough

Eastham is a village and an electoral ward of the Metropolitan Borough of Wirral, in Merseyside, England. Historically (until 1974), it was part of Cheshire. It is situated on the Wirral Peninsula, to the south of Bromborough and to the east of Willaston.

At the 2001 census, it had a population of 12,250, although the total ward population for the village stood at 13,637 In 2011, the villages population was not measured separately but a review was carried out for the ward. The total population had risen to 13,882.

== History ==
Eastham is cited as one of the oldest villages on the Wirral Peninsula and has been inhabited since Anglo-Saxon times. The name derives from its location: ham ("home") situated to the east of Willaston, which was then the principal settlement. The original village is clustered around St. Mary's Church, whose churchyard contains an ancient yew tree. Much of the surrounding land was once owned by the powerful Stanley family.

Since the Middle Ages, a ferry service operated across the River Mersey between Eastham and Liverpool, the early ferries being run by monks from the Abbey of St. Werburgh. By the late 1700s, up to 40 coaches each day arrived at a newly built pier, carrying passengers and goods for the ferry. Paddle steamers were introduced in 1816 to replace the sailing boats, but the demand for a service declined in the 1840s with the opening of a railway link between Chester and Birkenhead Woodside Ferry. In 1846, the owner of the ferry, Thomas Stanley, built the Eastham Ferry Hotel and shortly after, the Pleasure Gardens were added to attract more visitors. The gardens were landscaped with rhododendrons, azaleas, ornamental trees and fountains. Attractions included a zoo, with bears, lions, monkeys and antelope, an open-air stage, tea rooms, bandstand, ballroom, boating lake, water chute.

Entertainers performed in the gardens during summer, and included Blondin, the famous tight-rope walker who once wheeled a local boy across a high wire in a wheelbarrow. In 1894, the Manchester Ship Canal was opened by Queen Victoria, bringing added prosperity to the area and a Jubilee Arch was built at the entrance to the Pleasure Gardens in 1897 to commemorate her Diamond Jubilee.

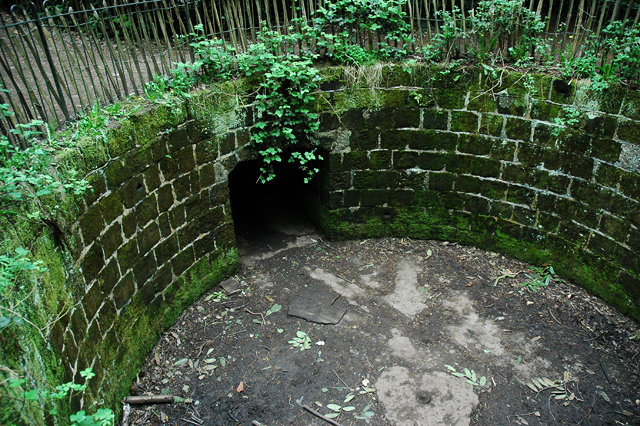
The 'Bear Pit' at Eastham Woodland & Country Park as it stood in 2006.

In 1854 the American novelist Nathaniel Hawthorne, whilst in the position of United States consul in Liverpool, visited Eastham and declared it to be: "the finest old English village I have seen, with many antique houses, and with altogether a rural and picturesque aspect, unlike anything in America, and yet possessing a familiar look, as if it were something I had dreamed about."

In its heyday Eastham Ferry was known as the 'Richmond of the Mersey', but its popularity declined during the 1920s and the last paddle steamer crossing took place in 1929. The Pleasure Gardens fell into disrepair during the 1930s and the iron pier and Jubilee Arch were later dismantled. In 1970, to commemorate European Conservation Year, the area was designated a Woodland & Country Park and today, it is once more a popular place of recreation.

In 1951 the civil parish had a population of 5598. On 1 April 1974 the parish was abolished.

== Geography ==
Eastham is the southernmost area of the Merseyside part of Wirral, lying within a green belt area bordering Merseyside and Cheshire, adjacent to the River Mersey. It is located close to the M53 motorway, and lies directly on the A41 road, the main road between Birkenhead and Birmingham. It is also close to the city of Chester and shares a proximity to the village of Port Sunlight, an historic centre for the British soap industry. It is situated a particularly short distance away from Willaston village.

== Open spaces ==
As well as Eastham Country Park and Woods, the Lowfields, close to Eastham Rake Station, is the start of a guided walk suggested by Wirral Metropolitan Borough Council, following Dibbinsdale Brook and leads onto the Wirral Way.

Dibbinsdale is a local nature reserve and Dibbinsdale Brook and Clatter Brook run through the Brookhurst area of Eastham and into Bromborough. There is also a private golf club, Eastham Lodge, a mature parkland course with views across the River Mersey.

Near to the village centre is a small public area called Torr Park, Which is home to the village cricket club. It was founded by the Stanley family as an area for recreation. In the present day the park offers tennis courts, a children's play area and a cricket field.

At 8.45 am each morning a siren is heard. It is said to be based in the Queen Elizabeth II dock who use it as their fire alarm and test it each morning. It has the distinct sound of a World War II siren and has been sounded each morning for at least 50 years.

== Transport ==
Eastham Locks form the western end of the Manchester Ship Canal, and is the largest lock in the UK. In order to provide berthing facilities for large tankers that could not be accommodated on the canal due to size, the Queen Elizabeth II Dock was constructed, with vehicular access from Ferry Road.

Eastham Rake railway station opened in 1995 on the Wirral Line of the Merseyrail network.

== See also ==
- Listed buildings in Eastham, Merseyside

== Bibliography ==
- Mortimer, William Williams (1847). The History of the Hundred of Wirral. London: Whittaker & Co. pp219-222.
