= St. Mary's Episcopal Church (Brooklyn) =

Church in Brooklyn, New York

- U.S. National Register of Historic Places
- New York State Register of Historic Places
- New York City Landmark
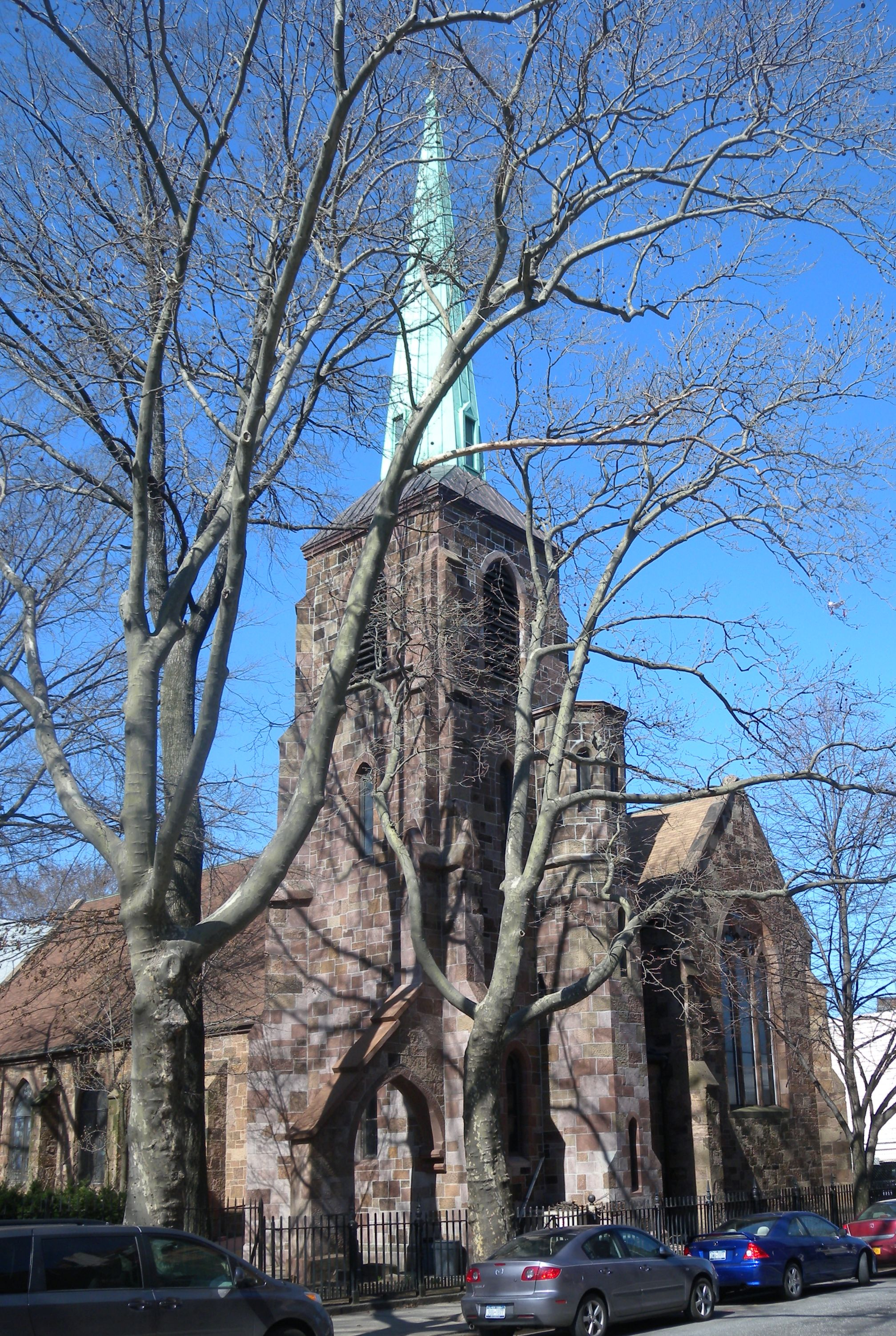

- Location within New York City Location within New York Location within the United States
- Location: 230 Classon Ave., Brooklyn, New York
- Coordinates: 40°41′34″N 73°57′40″W
- Area: less than one acre
- Built: 1858
- Architect: Richard T. Auchmuty
- Architectural style: Gothic Revival
- NRHP reference No.: 83001701
- NYSRHP No.: 04701.002500
- NYCL No.: 2013

Significant dates
- Added to NRHP: July 21, 1983
- Designated NYSRHP: June 13, 1983
- Designated NYCL: October 27, 1981

St. Mary's Episcopal Church is an historic Episcopal church at 230 Classon Avenue in Clinton Hill, Brooklyn, New York City. It was built in 1858 of Belleville brownstone in the Gothic Revival style.

The building features a square tower with polygonal extension and a broach spire. The Johnson Memorial Parish House was built in 1892. Also on the property is the rectory; a 2 1/2-story brick house with a mansard roof and large oriel window. It was listed on the National Register of Historic Places in 1983.

Parishioners are largely Anglicans of West Indian descent. Community events include concerts, flea markets, brunches, classes, and lectures. In July 2011, the Sacristy of the Church was renovated.

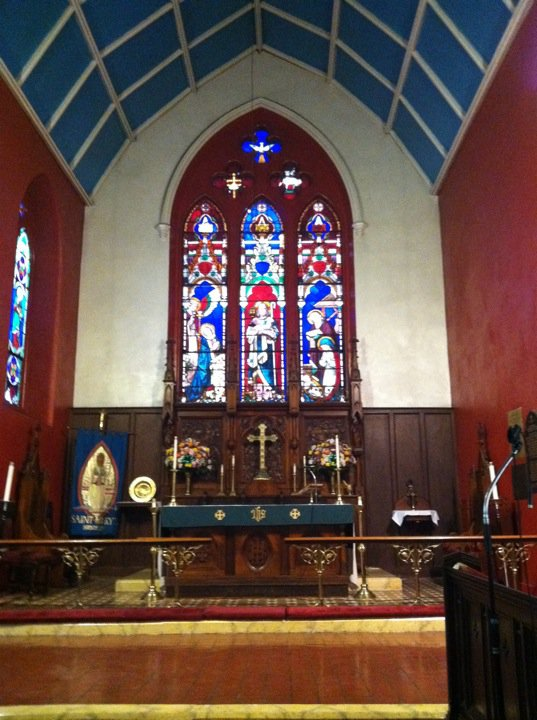
High Altar, St. Mary's Church, Brooklyn NY
