= All Saints Episcopal Church (Northfield, Minnesota) =

Historic church in Minnesota, United States

- U.S. National Register of Historic Places
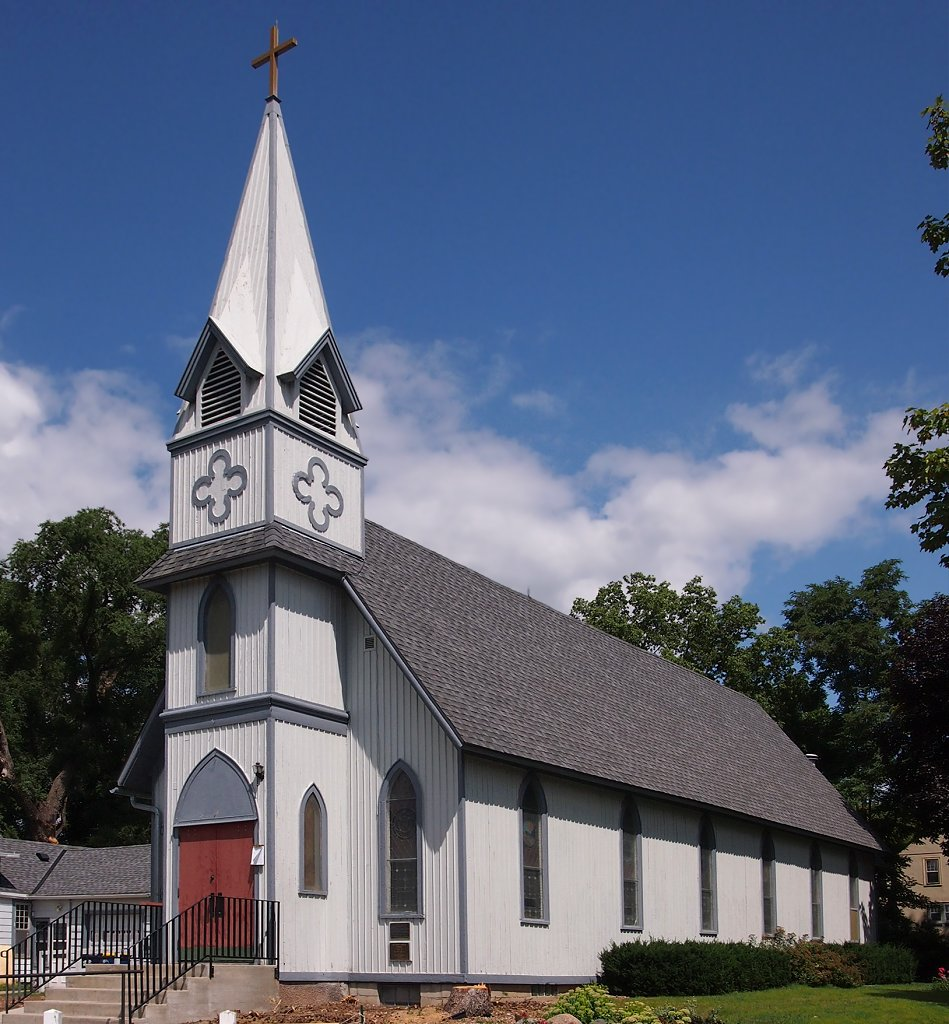
- All Saints Church from the southwest

- Location within Minnesota Location within the United States
- Location: Washington and 5th Sts., Northfield, Minnesota
- Coordinates: 44°27′19″N 93°9′29″W
- Area: less than one acre
- Built: 1866
- Built by: S.B. Hoag, Charles Anderson, Henry B. Martin
- Architectural style: Gothic Revival
- MPS: Rice County MRA
- NRHP reference No.: 82003027
- Added to NRHP: April 6, 1982

All Saints Episcopal Church in Northfield, Minnesota, United States, is a historic church listed on the National Register of Historic Places and the oldest church in Northfield. The church reported 144 members in 2020 and 125 members in 2023; no membership statistics were reported in 2024 parochial reports. Plate and pledge income reported for the congregation in 2024 was $168,672 with average Sunday attendance (ASA) of 75 persons. The Rev. Cody Maynus is the current rector.

== History ==
The parish was established in 1858, two years after Northfield was founded by John W. North in 1856. The congregation originally held services in the Northfield Lyceum building. In 1866, the Reverend Solomon S. Burleson organized an effort to raise money for a new building. The Reverend James Lloyd Breck from the Associated Parish in Faribault was the first Priest-in-Charge. The architect is unknown, but there is speculation that Bishop Henry Benjamin Whipple may have contributed to the design, since he had an interest in architecture. The church is designed in a Gothic Revival style, with a wood frame and board and batten siding. In 1869 children in Sunday School classes organized an effort to buy a bell for the tower. The building was expanded ten years later, lengthening the church by twenty feet. This expansion was driven by the influx of students from Carleton College.

There have been few major changes to the church since 1879. In 1982 a committee organized the renovation of the church interior to restore its historic character. The work included repairing windows, refinishing and replacing floors, replacing pews based on original designs, and other woodwork. The church was listed on the National Register in 1982.

In January 2013 the church announced plans for a $2 million expansion of the facility, to be designed by SMSQ Architects and executed by Northfield Construction Company. The expansion plan would retain the historic church structure, but would add 12,000 square feet (1,100 m^{2}) by removing the parish house and past additions on the rear of the main church building and building a new two-story addition in their place. Church leaders hoped to begin work in April 2013 and finish before Christmas.
