= Church of the Good Shepherd (Lake Charles, Louisiana) =

Historic church in Louisiana, United States

- Episcopal Church of the Good Shepherd
- U.S. National Register of Historic Places
- U.S. Historic district – Contributing property
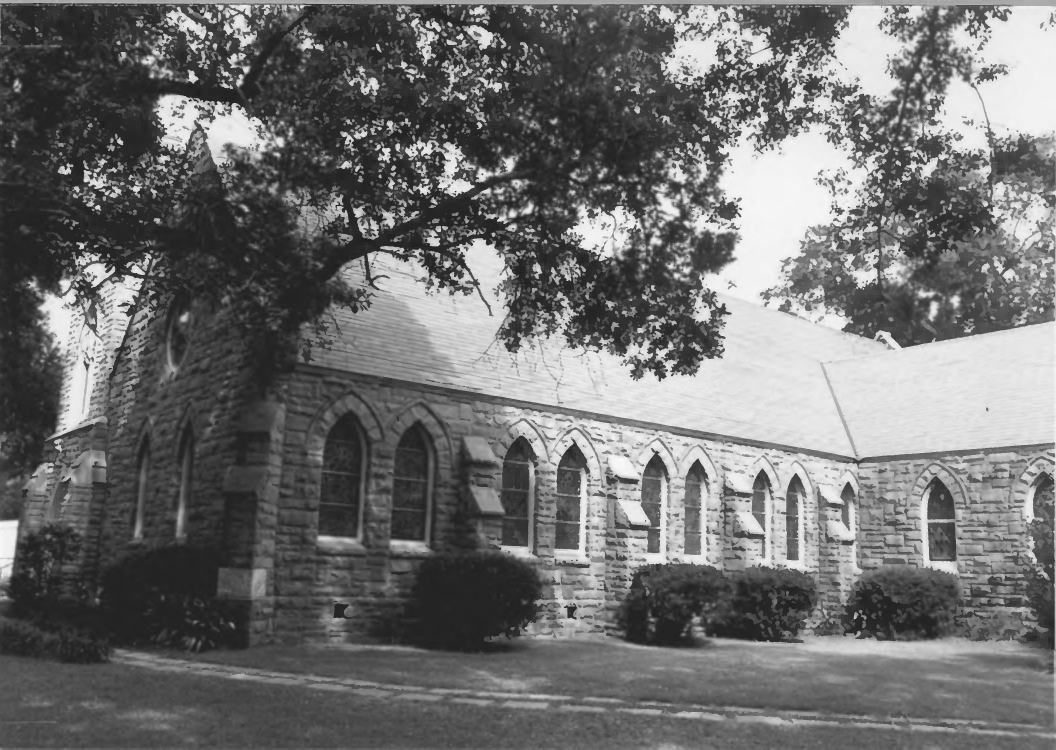

- Location within Louisiana Location within the United States
- Location: 715 Kirkman Street, Lake Charles, Louisiana
- Coordinates: 30°13′50″N 93°12′34″W
- Area: 1 acre (0.40 ha)
- Built: 1896
- Architect: Charles William Bulger
- Architectural style: Gothic Revival
- Part of: Lake Charles Historic District (ID90000434)
- NRHP reference No.: 83003607

Significant dates
- Designated NRHP: December 22, 1983
- Designated CP: March 16, 1990

The Church of the Good Shepherd is an historic Episcopal church building located at 715 Kirkman Street in Lake Charles, Calcasieu Parish, Louisiana, United States. Designed by noted Dallas architect C.W. Bulger in the Gothic Revival style of architecture, it was built of stone in 1896.

The church was added to the National Register of Historic Places on December 22, 1983 and was added as a contributing property to the Lake Charles Historic District at the time of its creation on March 16, 1990.

== Current use ==
The Church of the Good Shepherd is an active parish in the Episcopal Diocese of Western Louisiana.

== See also ==
- National Register of Historic Places listings in Calcasieu Parish, Louisiana
- Lake Charles Historic District
- Church of the Good Shepherd (disambiguation)
