= Church of the Good Shepherd (Syracuse, New York) =

Historic church in New York, United States

- U.S. National Register of Historic Places
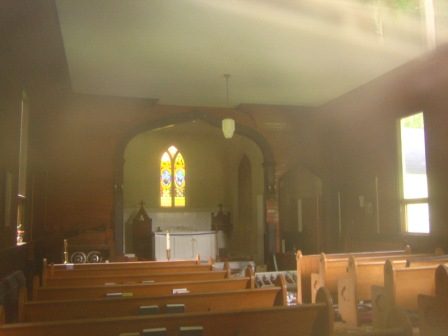

- Location within New York Location within the United States
- Location: NY 11A, S of jct. with Webster Rd., Onondaga Reservation, near Syracuse, New York
- Coordinates: 42°56′42″N 76°9′43″W
- Area: less than one acre
- Built: 1869-1870
- Architectural style: Gothic Revival
- MPS: Historic Churches of the Episcopal Diocese of Central New York MPS
- NRHP reference No.: 97000113
- Added to NRHP: May 8, 1997

The Church of the Good Shepherd is a historic Episcopal church located on the Onondaga Indian Reservation near Syracuse, Onondaga County, New York. It is an older building that was remodeled in 1869-1870 for Episcopal worship. It is a one-story, rectangular frame church with Gothic Revival style design elements. The three bay by three bay building has a projecting entrance topped by a one-stage bell tower. The building features pointed arched openings.

It was listed on the National Register of Historic Places in 1997. As of 2025, it appears to be abandoned.

== Gallery ==
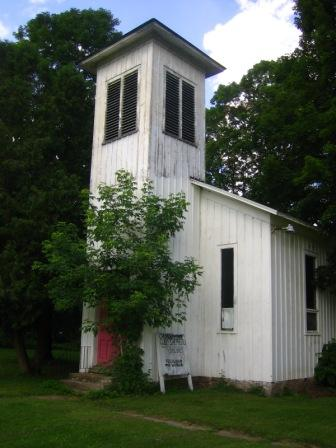
Church

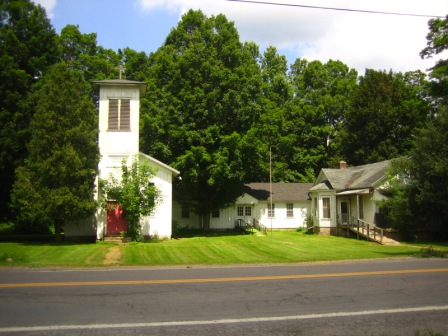
Addition
