= Church of the Good Shepherd (Coleraine, Minnesota) =

Historic church in Minnesota, United States

- U.S. National Register of Historic Places
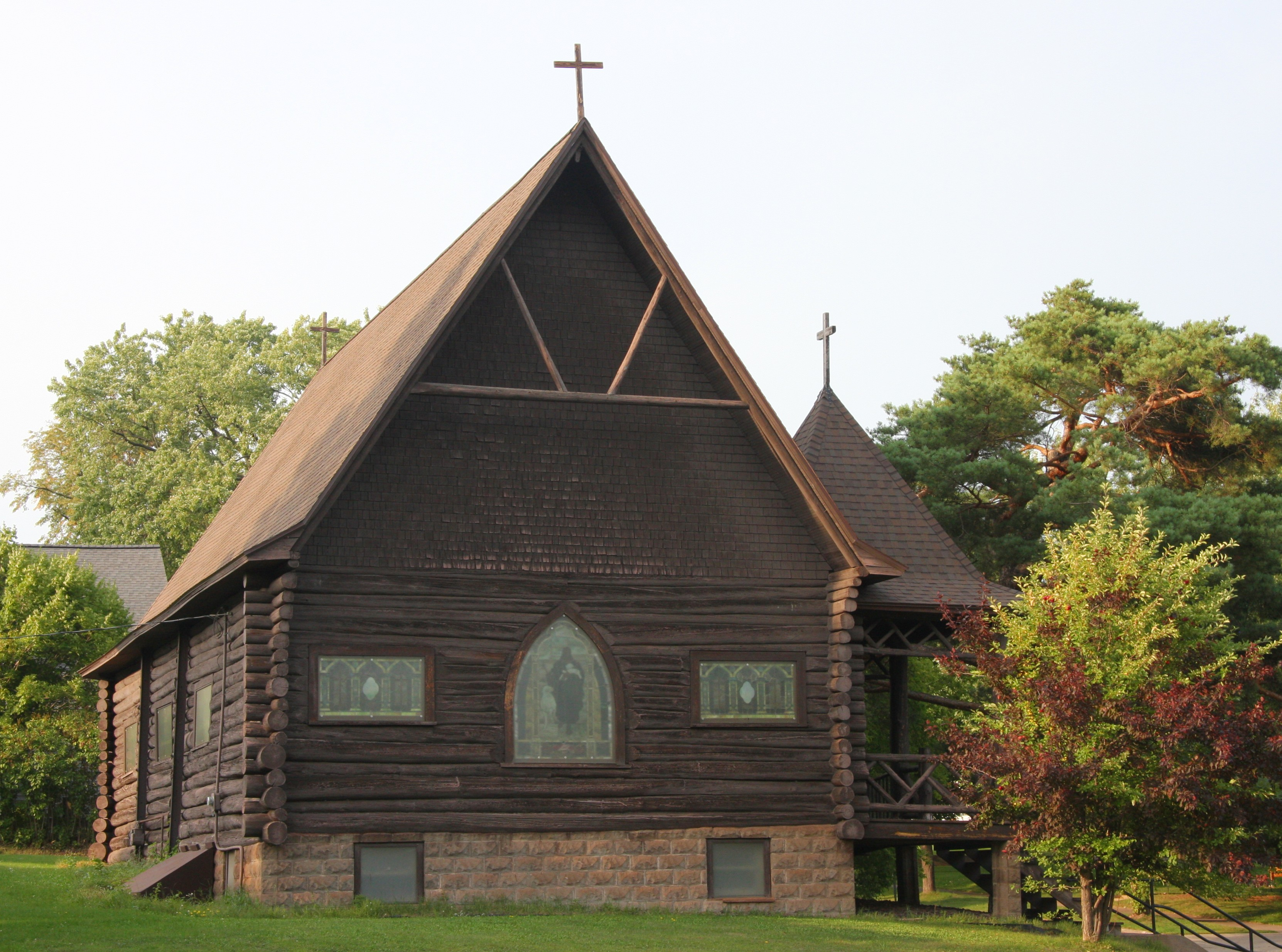
- The church in 2015

- Location within Minnesota Location within the United States
- Location: Off U.S. 169, Coleraine, Minnesota
- Coordinates: 47°17′14″N 93°25′45″W
- Area: less than one acre
- Built: 1908
- Architectural style: log structure
- NRHP reference No.: 80002081
- Added to NRHP: August 11, 1980

Church of the Good Shepherd is a historic church at 601 Cole Street off U.S. Route 169 in Coleraine, Minnesota. The church is also known as "The Log Church" and was built in 1908. John C. Greenway, a member of the parish, supervised the construction of the church. The logs were harvested from a patch of land that had previously never been logged. The interior is built entirely of wood, and the altar rail and lectern are made of birch logs. The church was dedicated by Bishop James Dow Morrison on November 15, 1908.

The church was listed on the National Register of Historic Places in 1980. It closed on December 26, 1982, due to declining enrollment. In March 1987, its owner, Christ Episcopal Church in Grand Rapids deeded the church to the city, with the understanding that it would be restored and maintained to continue to qualify for the National Register. The community organized a Log Church Preservation Committee to perform maintenance and restoration tasks. The church is available for weddings, special events, and cultural events.
