= Episcopal Church of the Good Shepherd (Ogden, Utah) =

Historic church in Utah, United States

- U.S. National Register of Historic Places
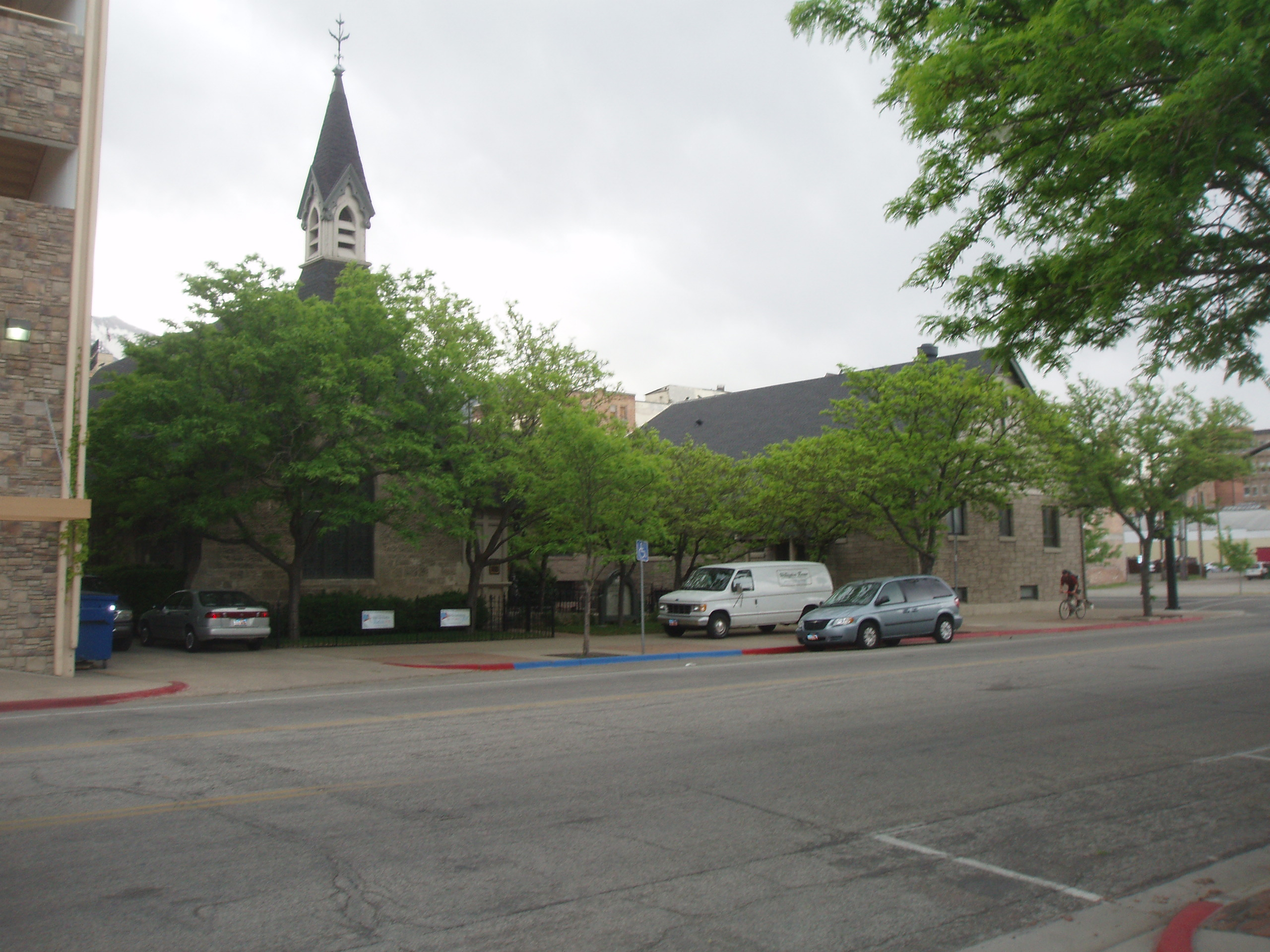

- Location within Utah Location within the United States
- Location: 2374 Grant Ave., Ogden, Utah
- Coordinates: 41°13′23″N 111°58′19″W
- Area: Less than one acre
- Built: 1875
- Architect: Gordon W. Lloyd
- Architectural style: Gothic Revival, Carpenter Gothic
- NRHP reference No.: 73001864
- Added to NRHP: April 3, 1973

The Episcopal Church of the Good Shepherd is a historic church at 2374 Grant Avenue in Ogden, Utah. It was built in 1875 and added to the National Register of Historic Places in 1973.

== Building History ==
Good Shepherd Episcopal Church historic sanctuary was built in 1875 and is said to be the oldest building in continuous use in Ogden, Utah.

Daniel Sylvester Tuttle was elected in 1866 to be the Missionary Bishop of Montana, with jurisdiction in Idaho and Utah Territories. Bishop Tuttle brought James Lee Gillogly as minister to Ogden in 1870. He and his wife Lucelia arrived on a Saturday and the very next day began holding services in the waiting room of the Ogden railroad depot. For a time they also lived in an unused freight car.

In the winter of 1871, the Gilloglys purchased the corner on which Good Shepherd Church now stands for $1500 with money given by John D. Wolfe of New York City. The purchase included an old tannery which the congregation used for services and a day school. Mrs. Theodore Isham of Malden, New York gifted the church with a 515-pound bell first rung on January 18, 1874. It was the first church bell heard in Ogden.

John W. Hamersley of New York donated $9500 to build the stone church in memory of his daughter Catherine L. Livingston. The architect was Gordon W Lloyd. The cornerstone of the current building was laid by Bishop Tuttle on April 29, 1874 with relics and documents inside that are still there. Building stones were hauled by ox team from Mendon, Utah, about 50 miles north of Ogden. Simple stained glass windows and furnishings were given as memorial. Oil lamps were placed between the windows for light, and heat came from a coal stove. The church was consecrated on February 6, 1875.

Electric lights were added in 1895. Although a fire destroyed parish records, we know from pictures that the north-south parish hall wing was added to the church building about 1906. The sewer was also connected at that time. In 1956 the church added a wing now called Tuttle Hall.

Over a period of 30 years from 1948 to 1978, the original windows were replaced with vibrant stained glass windows made by Connick Association of Boston, Mass. The windows depict Christ the Good Shepherd, Saint Luke, Ruth, Saint John, Mary and Martha, Christ and the Children, Saint Matthew, Saint Andrew, Saint Mark, Saint Peter, and The Resurrection.

== Current use ==
As a downtown church, Good Shepherd has long opened its doors to community groups. Over the years, the Head-Start Program, Migrant Council, and AA are some of the many programs who have met at the church.

In 2010, the new Ed and Mary Garrison Educational center, a 7,486 square foot multi-use wing with classrooms, offices, a large sacristy and a nursery. November 24, 2013, the church consecrated a new chapel in the Garrison wing, the Santa Maria Virgen Chapel. The chapel is a dedicated space for El Buen Pastor, the Latino Mission of Good Shepherd. Formerly, El Buen Pastor worshipped in the main Nave and Sanctuary of Good Shepherd. Worship services in English and Spanish can be held at the same time, enabling both groups to have Sunday School together before the service and fellowship afterward.

In 2013, with donations from the congregation and community, the church completed a restoration of the sanctuary. The restoration preserved the original building, repointing stone walls, repairing the bell tower and cleaning and protecting the stained glass windows.
