= Trinity Episcopal Church (Lenox, Massachusetts) =

Historic church in Massachusetts, United States

- U.S. National Register of Historic Places
- U.S. Historic district – Contributing property
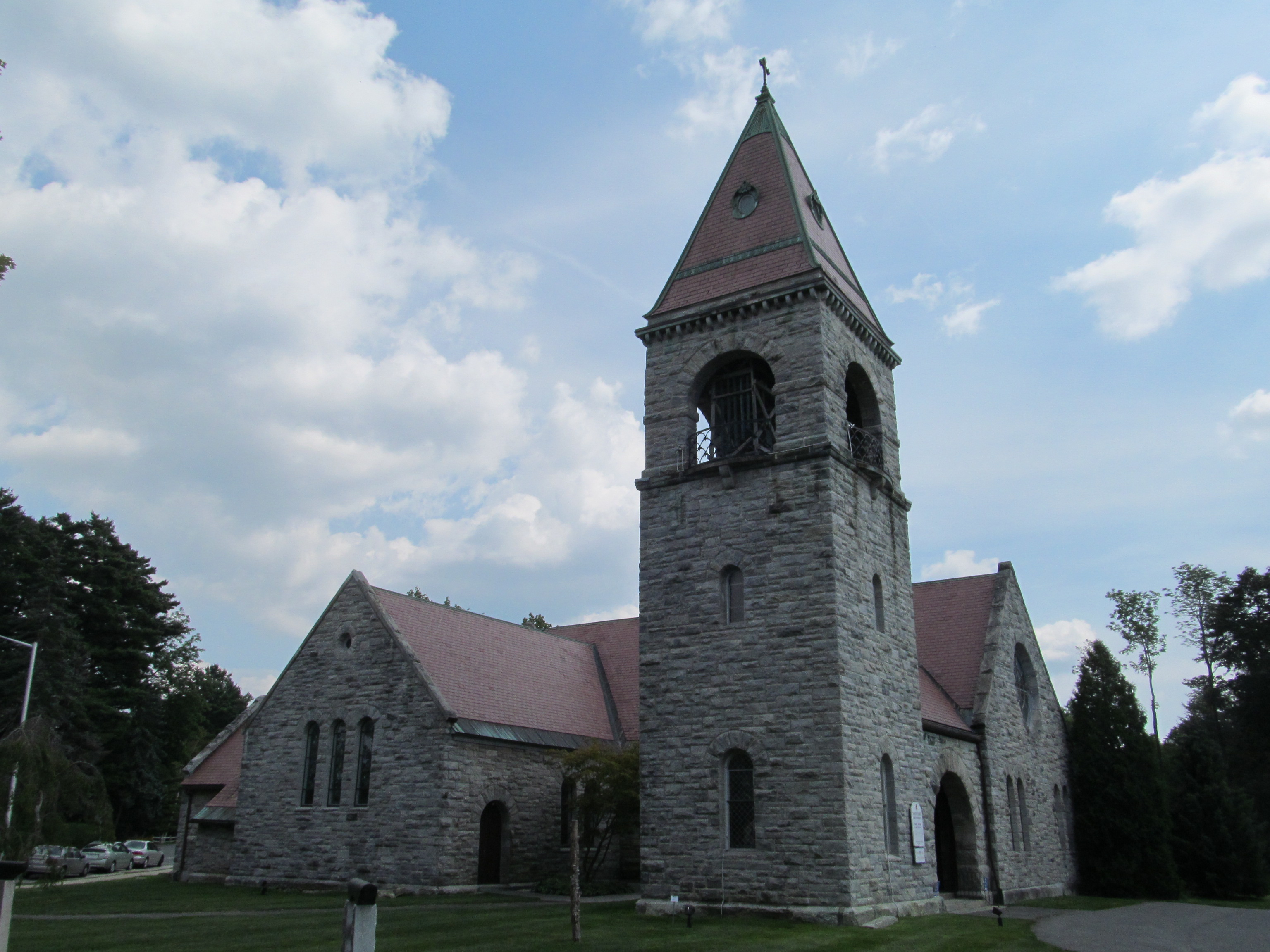
- Trinity Episcopal Church

- Location within Massachusetts Location within the United States
- Location: 88 Walker St., Lenox, Massachusetts
- Coordinates: 42°21′16″N 73°16′56″W
- Area: 1.4 acres (0.57 ha)
- Built: 1888
- Architect: Auchmuty, R.T.; McKim, Mead & White
- Architectural style: Romanesque
- Part of: Lenox Village Historic District (ID100006987)
- NRHP reference No.: 96000363

Significant dates
- Added to NRHP: April 4, 1996
- Designated CP: June 27, 2022

Trinity Episcopal Church is an historic Episcopal church building at 88 Walker Street in Lenox, Massachusetts. Built in 1888 for a congregation organized in 1793, it is a prominent local example of Romanesque architecture, funded by Gilded Age summer congregants. The church was listed on the National Register of Historic Places in 1996.

== History ==
The first known Episcopalian church services to take place in Lenox were in 1763; it was not until 1793 that a congregation was organized. Its first building, similar to a typical colonial meeting house, was built in 1818, and survives in somewhat altered form as a commercial building on Church Street. The congregation remained small until after the American Civil War, when wealthy residents of large cities began summering in Lenox. The church was enlarged in 1873, but by 1882 it was again judged too small.

Robert Auchmuty, a congregant who had apprenticed with architect James Renwick Jr., headed the committee that oversaw design and construction of the replacement. Auchmuty worked with Charles Follen McKim of McKim, Mead & White to develop plans for the church, and supervised its construction. It was built in 1888 in the Gothic Revival style for the use of a congregation composed in part of the wealthy summer visitors to The Berkshires, who funded its construction. The church was the location of society weddings. For example, on June 6, 1895, James A. Burden Jr., an heir to the Burden Iron Works, wed Florence Adele Sloan, a direct descendant of Cornelius Vanderbilt, in this church.

== Notable people ==
- Robert Shaw Sturgis Whitman, rector

== See also ==
- National Register of Historic Places listings in Berkshire County, Massachusetts
