= Islamic Awareness Center =

Mosque in a former church in Binghamton, New York, United States

- Masjid Al-Tawheed formerly the Episcopal Church of the Good Shepherd
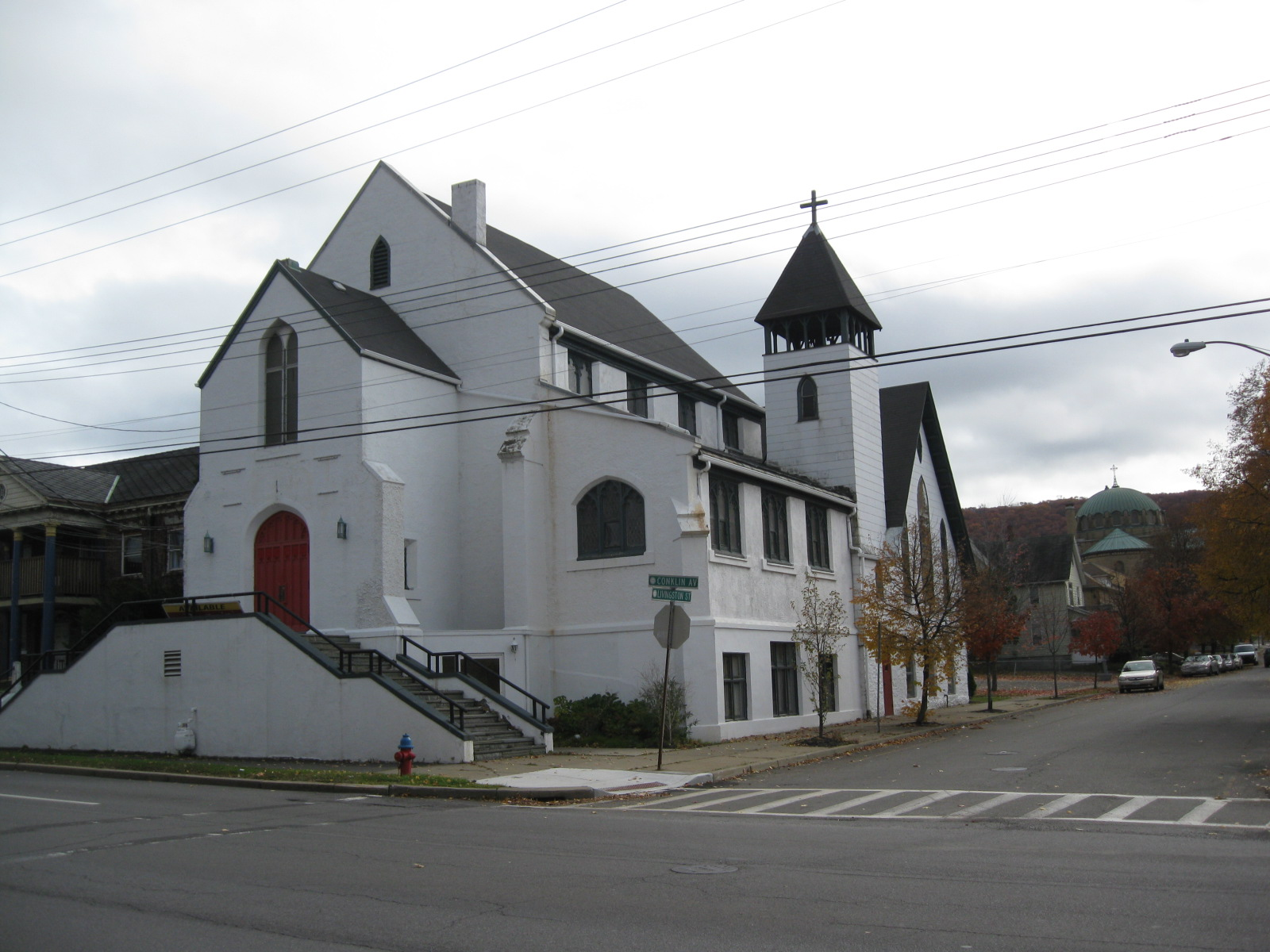
- The former Episcopal Church of the Good Shepherd, pictured in 2009 before its sale to the Islamic Awareness Center and conversion to a mosque.

- Location in New York

Religion
- Affiliation: Islam
- Branch/tradition: Sunni

Location
- Location: 74 Conklin Avenue, Binghamton, New York 13903
- Interactive map of Islamic Awareness Center
- Coordinates: 42.09228°N 75.90822°W

Architecture
- Architect: Henry Martyn Congdon
- Type: Church
- Style: Gothic Revival
- Completed: 1871

Website
- Official Website

The Islamic Awareness Center, also known as Masjid Al-Tawheed (Arabic: مسجد التوحيد), is a mosque and Dawah institution for the purpose of Islamic propagation in Binghamton, New York. Since 2011, the Islamic Awareness Center has been located in the historic former building of the Episcopal Church of the Good Shepherd. In 2010, after the Good Shepherd congregation left the Episcopal Church as part of the Anglican realignment and lost a lawsuit to keep its property, the Episcopal Diocese of Central New York controversially sold the building for far less than its appraised value to the Islamic Awareness Center rather than to the departing Anglican congregation.

== History of the building ==
The Episcopal Church of the Good Shepherd was one of three Episcopal churches in Binghamton, NY alongside Trinity Memorial Church and Christ Church. Designed by Henry Martyn Congdon, a prolific architect of Episcopal churches, Good Shepherd was completed in 1871.

=== Anglican realignment ===
In the early 2000s, Good Shepherd's clergy and several of its members objected to theological liberalism and the ordination of gay clergy in the Episcopal Church. As part of the broader Anglican realignment, Good Shepherd in November 2007 voted to withdraw from the Episcopal Diocese of Central New York and affiliate with the Anglican Church of Kenya. The rector and his wife, the Rev. Matthew Kennedy and the Rev. Anne Kennedy, voluntarily renounced their orders in the Episcopal Church in December 2007, and the congregation began negotiations with the diocese over ownership of the property, making two separate offers of up to $250,000 for the church and rectory and up to $150,000 for the church.

However, in April 2008, the diocese sued the congregation seeking an injunction ordering it to hand over the church property. Under Presiding Bishop Katharine Jefferts Schori, the Episcopal Church maintained a policy that "the only people who can't buy the buildings are the Anglicans," according to NPR, with Jefferts Schori stating that the Episcopal Church must "not be in the business of setting up competitors that want to either destroy or replace the Episcopal Church." In January 2009, a New York state trial court judge ruled in favor of the diocese, deferring to the Dennis Canon holding that Episcopal Church properties are held in trust for the national church. The congregation vacated its building later that month and returned it to the diocese.

A year later, in February 2010, the Diocese of Central New York sold the church to the Islamic Awareness Center, which had been founded in 2001 to serve the "few hundred" Muslims who live in and near Broome County. The purchase price was $50,000, just one-third of what had been offered by the departing congregation and far less than the assessed value of $386,400.

The departing congregation relocated to a vacant Catholic church nearby and was eventually sold the church by the local Catholic diocese. It renamed itself the Anglican Church of the Good Shepherd. The Kennedys spoke about their experience of the lawsuit, the departure from the property, and its conversion to a mosque at the 2018 Global Anglican Future Conference in Jerusalem.

== Architecture ==
Good Shepherd was designed in a Gothic Revival style with an aisle on the church's liturgical south side separated by a row of Gothic arches. The roof features multiple gables and includes a belfry at the rear of the church.

As part of the conversion from a church to a mosque, the cross was removed from the steeple and the traditional Episcopalian red doors were repainted green. Replaced by carpets for prayer, the pews were removed and donated.

== Services ==
The Islamic Awareness Center offers prayer five times daily for a congregation that included about 146 families as of 2019. The mosque also provides Islamic burial and wedding services along with a food pantry and free community meal on Saturdays. The IAC also provides after-school activities, Islamic Sunday school, Arabic classes and book clubs. In 2019, the Islamic Awareness Center hosted an open house as part of a tour of houses of worship in Binghamton.
