= Grace Episcopal Church =

Grace Episcopal Church, or variants thereof, may refer to:

== United States ==
(by state then city)

=== Alabama ===
- Grace Episcopal Church (Anniston, Alabama)
- Grace Episcopal Church (Clayton, Alabama)
- Grace Episcopal Church (Mount Meigs, Alabama)

=== Arkansas ===
- Grace Episcopal Church (Wynne, Arkansas)

=== California ===
- Grace Episcopal Church (Boulder Creek, California)
- Grace Episcopal Church (St. Helena, California)
- Grace Episcopal Church (San Marcos, California)

=== Colorado ===
- Grace Episcopal Church (Buena Vista, Colorado)
- Grace and St. Stephen's Episcopal Church, Colorado Springs
- Grace Episcopal Church (Georgetown, Colorado), in Clear Creek County

=== Florida ===
- Grace Episcopal Church and Guild Hall (Port Orange, Florida)

=== Indiana ===
- Grace Episcopal Church (Muncie, Indiana), in Delaware County, Indiana, a parish of the Episcopal Diocese of Indianapolis

=== Illinois ===
- Grace Episcopal Church (Chicago)
- Grace Episcopal Church (Galena, Illinois)
- Grace Episcopal Church (Oak Park, Illinois)

=== Kentucky ===
- Grace Episcopal Church (Hopkinsville, Kentucky)
- Grace Episcopal Church (Paducah, Kentucky)

=== Louisiana ===
- Grace Episcopal Church (St. Francisville, Louisiana)
- Grace Episcopal Church (New Orleans, Louisiana)

=== Maine ===
- Grace Episcopal Church (Robbinston, Maine)

=== Maryland ===
- Grace and St. Peter's Church, Mount Vernon, Baltimore
- Grace Episcopal Church (Mt. Vernon, Maryland)
- Grace Episcopal Church Complex (Taylor's Island, Maryland)
- Grace Reformed Episcopal Church, Havre de Grace, historic district contributing property

=== Massachusetts ===
- Grace Episcopal Church (Amherst, Massachusetts)
- Grace Episcopal Church (Lawrence, Massachusetts)
- Grace Episcopal Church (Medford, Massachusetts)
- Grace Episcopal Church (Newton, Massachusetts)

=== Michigan ===
- Grace Episcopal Church in East Grand Rapids, Michigan
- Grace Episcopal Church (Jonesville, Michigan)
- Grace Episcopal Church (Mount Clemens, Michigan)
- Grace Episcopal Church in Traverse City, Michigan

=== Mississippi ===
- Grace Episcopal Church (Rosedale, Mississippi)

=== Missouri ===
- Grace Episcopal Church (Chillicothe, Missouri)
- Grace Episcopal Church (Kirkwood, Missouri)

=== New Jersey ===
- Grace Episcopal Church (Plainfield, New Jersey)
- Grace Episcopal Church (Madison, New Jersey)
- Grace Church (Newark)

=== New Hampshire ===
- Grace Episcopal Church (Manchester, New Hampshire), listed on the New Hampshire State Register of Historic Places

=== New York ===
- Grace Church (Manhattan), an Episcopal Parish church in New York City
- Grace Church (Nyack, New York)
- Grace Episcopal Church (Bronx, New York), located on City Island
- Grace Episcopal Church Complex (Lyons, New York)
- Grace Episcopal Church (Middletown, New York)
- Grace Episcopal Church Complex (Queens)
- Grace Episcopal Church (Syracuse, New York)
- Grace Episcopal Church (Waverly, New York)
- Grace Episcopal Church (Whitney Point, New York)

=== North Carolina ===
- Grace Episcopal Church, Morganton, North Carolina
- Grace Episcopal Church (Lexington, North Carolina)
- Grace Episcopal Church (Trenton, North Carolina)
- Grace Episcopal Church (Weldon, North Carolina)

=== North Dakota ===
- Grace Episcopal Church (Jamestown, North Dakota)
- Grace Episcopal Church (Minnewaukan, North Dakota)
- Grace Episcopal Church (Pembina, North Dakota)

=== Ohio ===
- Grace Church (Cincinnati, Ohio)
- Grace Episcopal Church (Sandusky, Ohio)

=== Oregon ===
- Grace Episcopal Church (Astoria, Oregon)

=== Pennsylvania ===
- Grace Episcopal Church (Pittsburgh)

=== South Carolina ===
- Grace Episcopal Church (Charleston, South Carolina)

=== South Dakota ===
- Grace Episcopal Church (Huron, South Dakota)

=== Tennessee ===
- Grace Episcopal Church (Memphis, Tennessee), listed on the NRHP in Shelby County, Tennessee
- Grace Episcopal Church (Spring Hill, Tennessee)

=== Texas ===
- Grace Episcopal Church (Cuero, Texas)
- Grace Episcopal Church (Galveston, Texas)
- Grace Episcopal Church (Georgetown, Texas), formerly NRHP-listed and now known as Grace Heritage Center

=== Virginia ===
- Grace Episcopal Church (Alexandria, Virginia)
- Grace Episcopal Church (Keswick, Virginia)
- Grace Episcopal Church (Kilmarnock, Virginia)
- Christ and Grace Episcopal Church (Petersburg, Virginia)

=== Washington, D.C. ===
- Grace Episcopal Church (Washington, D.C.)

=== Wisconsin ===
- Grace Episcopal Church (Madison, Wisconsin)
- Grace Episcopal Church (Sheboygan, Wisconsin)

== See also ==
- Grace Church (disambiguation)
