= St. Paul's Episcopal Church (Beloit, Wisconsin) =

Episcopal church in Beloit, Wisconsin, USA

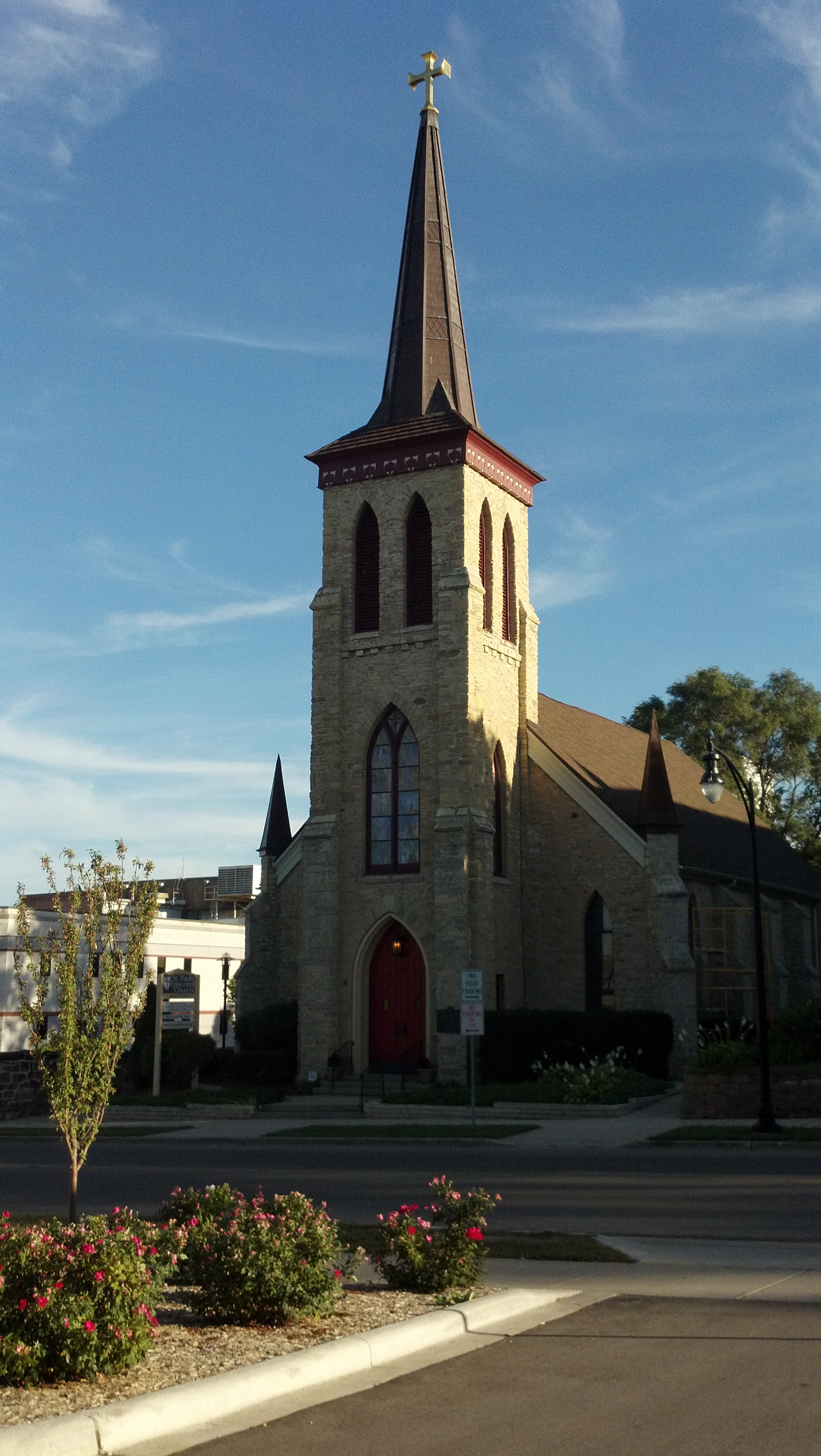
Church in 2013

St. Paul's Episcopal Church is a Gothic Revival-styled church built 1848–51 in Beloit, Wisconsin - the oldest church in continuous service in Rock County. On April 4, 1978, it was added to the National Register of Historic Places for its architectural significance. It is affiliated with the Episcopal Diocese of Milwaukee.

The cornerstone of St. Paul's was laid in the spring of 1848. The contractor was Col. Benjamin Vail and the carpenter was a Mr. Persels. Doors and windows were hauled from Milwaukee by ox wagon. The walls are buff limestone. Windows and doors are topped with pointed arches, the hallmark of Gothic Revival style. Other elements of that style are the buttresses and the emphasis on the vertical in the openings, the finials, and the spire on the steeple - all pointing toward heaven. The steeple is square, with buttresses on the corners, and in three stages. Above the steeple rises an graceful octagonal spire topped with a cross 100 feet above the ground. The first service was held in December 1851 and the finished church was consecrated by Bishop Jackson Kemper in 1856.

The architect isn't certain, but the design of St. Paul's is very similar to that of Grace Episcopal in Galena, Ill, which was designed by C.W. Otis, so it's likely that Otis supplied the plan.

Additions over the years have been sensitive and the building is largely intact. The NRHP nomination considers it "an outstanding example of early Gothic Revival architecture constructed of native Wisconsin limestone." It is one of the oldest surviving stone Gothic churches in the state.
