= Grace Church =

Grace Church may refer to:

== Canada ==
- Grace Church on-the-Hill, Toronto

== China ==
- Grace Church, Guanghan

== Poland ==
- Grace Church, Teschen or Jesus Church, a Lutheran basilica in Teschen, Poland

== United States ==
- Grace Cathedral (disambiguation)
- Grace Church (Ca Ira, Virginia)
- Grace Church (Buena Vista, Colorado)
- Grace Church (Brooklyn Heights)
- Grace Church (Cincinnati, Ohio)
- Grace Church (Clarkesville, Georgia)
- Grace Church (Denver)
- Grace Church (Manhattan)
- Grace Church (Newark)
- Grace Church Complex (Massapequa, New York)
- Grace Church (Scottsville, New York)
- Grace Church (Utica, New York)
- Grace Anglican Church (Pittsburgh)
- Grace Church (Providence, Rhode Island)
- Grace Church Cathedral, Charleston, South Carolina
- Grace Church Van Vorst, Jersey City, New Jersey
- Grace Church (Yorktown, Virginia)
- Grace Community Church, Los Angeles and other places
- Grace Reformed Episcopal Church, Havre de Grace, Maryland
- Grace Episcopal Church (disambiguation)
- Grace United Methodist Church (disambiguation)

== Other ==
- Grace Baptist Church (numerous)
