= Grace United Methodist Church =

Grace United Methodist Church may refer to:

- Grace United Methodist Church (Wilmington, Delaware)
- Grace United Methodist Church (St. Augustine, Florida)
- Grace United Methodist Church (Keene, New Hampshire)
- Grace United Methodist Church (Des Moines, Iowa)
