= Grace Memorial Episcopal Church =

Grace Memorial Episcopal Church may refer to:

- Grace Memorial Episcopal Church (Hammond, Louisiana), listed on the National Register of Historic Places (NRHP) in Tangipahoa Parish
- Grace Memorial Episcopal Church (Wabasha, Minnesota), NRHP-listed in Wabasha County

== See also ==
- Grace Church (disambiguation)
