= 26th Illinois Infantry Regiment =

26th Regiment Illinois Volunteer Infantry
- Illinois state flag
- Active: August 31, 1861 – July 20, 1865
- Country: United States
- Allegiance: (United States) Union; Illinois
- Branch: Infantry
- Size: Regiment

The 26th Regiment Illinois Volunteer Infantry was an infantry regiment that served in the Union Army during the American Civil War.

== Service ==
The 26th Illinois Infantry was organized for 3 years' service with seven companies at Camp Butler, Illinois and mustered into Federal service on August 31, 1861. Three more companies were raised by January 1, 1862.

The 26th Illinois Infantry on January 1, 1864, had 515 men present for duty, of whom 463 re-enlisted as veterans and were granted a furlough. At the end of the furlough, the regiment returned to the field with its ranks replenished with recruits. After the fall of Atlanta on September 1–2, 1864, most of the regiment's original officers mustered out on the expiration of their terms of service. The regiment participated in the Grand Review of the Armies on May 23–24, 1865, in Washington, D.C.; was mustered out on July 20, 1865, at Louisville, Kentucky; and on July 28, 1865, was paid off and disbanded at Springfield, Illinois.

== Total strength and casualties ==
The regiment suffered 2 officers and 88 enlisted men who were killed in action or mortally wounded, and 2 officers and 194 enlisted men who died of disease, for a total of 286 fatalities.

== Commanders ==
- Colonel John Mason Loomis - resigned on April 30, 1864.
- Lieutenant Colonel Robert A. Gilmore - mustered out on October 27, 1864, on expiration of term of service.
- Lieutenant Colonel Ira J. Bloomfield - mustered out with regiment on July 20, 1865.

== See also ==
- List of Illinois Civil War Units
- Illinois in the American Civil War
