= Grace Episcopal Church (Georgetown, Colorado) =

Historic church in Colorado, United States

- U.S. National Register of Historic Places
- Colorado State Register of Historic Properties
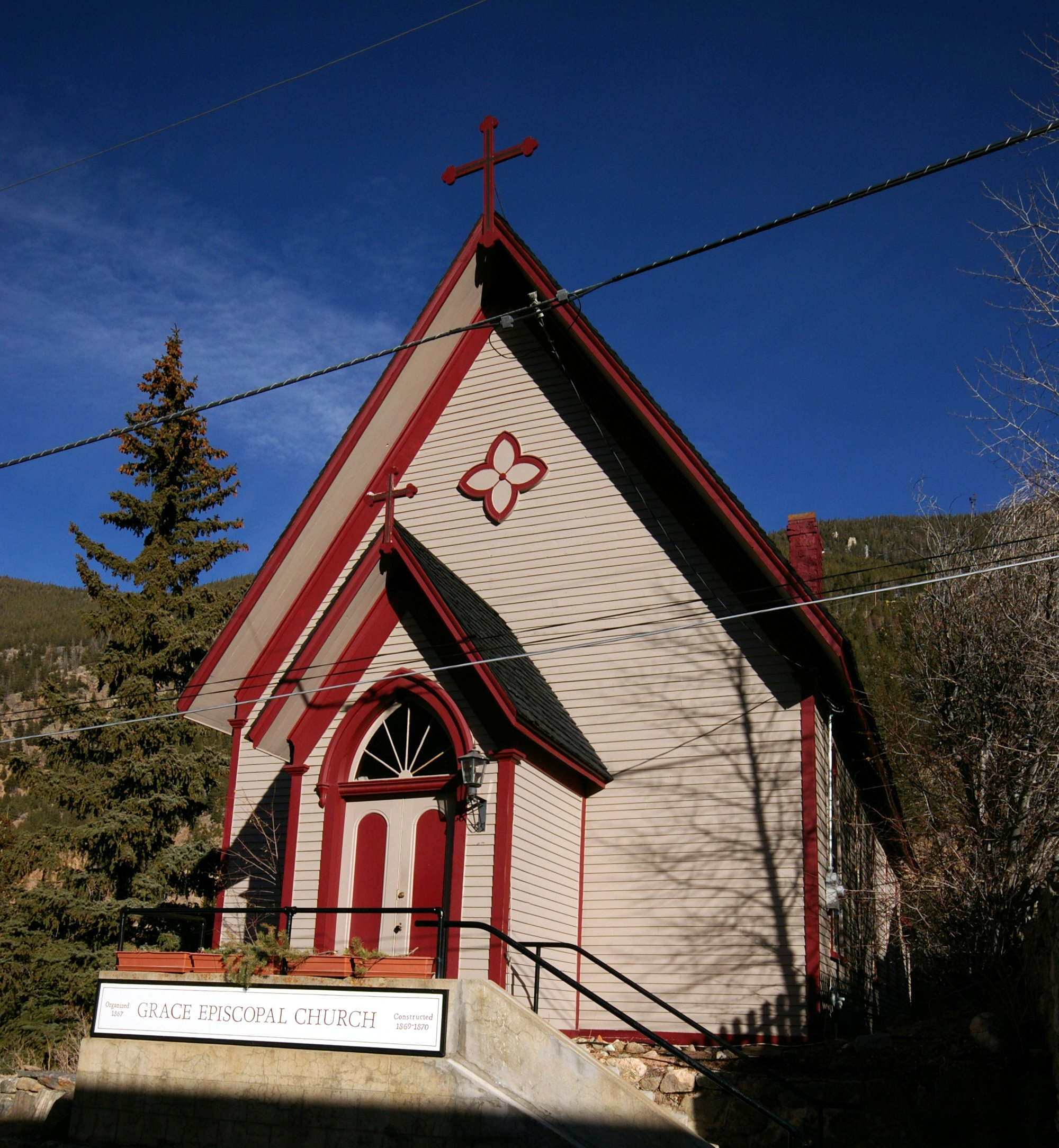
- Grace Episcopal Church, built 1870, now overlooks I-70 in Georgetown

- Location within Colorado Location within the United States
- Location: Taos St., between 4th and 5th Sts., Georgetown, Colorado
- Coordinates: 39°42′19″N 105°41′46″W
- Area: 0.5 acres (0.20 ha)
- Built: 1869
- Architectural style: Carpenter Gothic
- NRHP reference No.: 73000465
- CSRHP No.: 5CC.5
- Added to NRHP: August 14, 1973

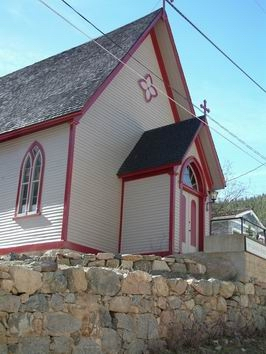
Grace Episcopal Church: another view

Grace Episcopal Church is an historic Carpenter Gothic church in Georgetown, Colorado. Built in 1870, it now overlooks Interstate 70. Grace Episcopal is still an active church in the Episcopal Diocese of Colorado. On August 14, 1973, the church was added to the National Register of Historic Places.

== History ==
The first Episcopal congregation in Georgetown was organized by 1867, eight years after Georgetown was founded. Its members included transplants to Georgetown from England, Cornwall, Wales, and the Eastern United States. The Church building was designed by local resident D. H. Joy, and construction began on the structure in 1869. A strong wind blew the half-completed structure down in November of that year, delaying construction until 1870. The building was finally consecrated in 1872.

The Altar and 1882 reredos

The interior of the church reflects the wealth of Georgetown in the 1870s. The original pews, which are still in use today, are made of walnut. The pipe organ, constructed by C. Anderson in Denver, was purchased in 1877. Still in use, it is the oldest operational organ in the state. In 1882, a three-panel reredos was painted by Mrs. Anderson P. Stephens of Lawson, Colorado. The reredos still stands above the altar.

The church continued to draw a small congregation after the 1894 silver crash. At times it has shared priests with the Episcopal churches in Central City and Idaho Springs. Services are held in the church every Sunday.

== Historic preservation ==
Interest in preserving the church has been bolstered by the availability of funds which are taken by the State from gambling revenues in Central City and Black Hawk, for use in the preservation of historic buildings. The church received a State Historical Fund for exterior preservation in 2002.

In 2006, the church received a Stephen H. Hart Award from the Colorado Historical Society for their outstanding work in restoring the neighboring Snetzer Building.

== See also ==
- National Register of Historic Places listings in Clear Creek County, Colorado
- Grace Episcopal Church (disambiguation)
