= John Mason Loomis =

American lumber tycoon

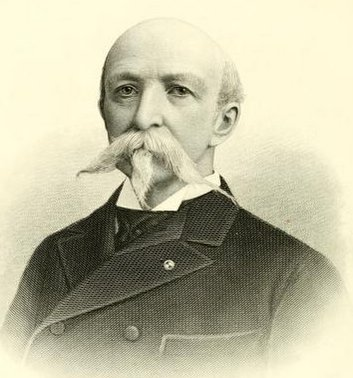
- Loomis in 1892
- Born: January 5, 1825; Windsor, Connecticut, US
- Died: August 2, 1900 (aged 75); Chicago, Illinois, US
- Resting place: Rosehill Cemetery, Chicago
- Education: public schools
- Occupations: businessman, lumberman, u.s. army colonel
- Known for: developing Mason County and Ludington, Michigan

Signature
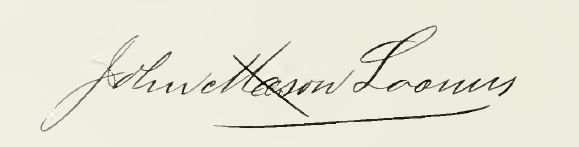

John Mason Loomis (January 5, 1825 – August 2, 1900) was a nineteenth-century American businessman and lumber tycoon from Chicago who was known for developing the city of Ludington, Michigan. He was involved with the Pere Marquette Lumber Company, which also operated salt distilleries that in turn influenced the salt industry of northern Michigan. The village of Pere Marquette benefited from these local industries and developed into the city Ludington.

Loomis served as a colonel in the Illinois militia, mobilized as part of the Union Army during the American Civil War, held several commands, and fought in several major battles. He was recommended twice for promotion to brigadier general. Loomis was also active in Chicago real estate investments and charitable causes. His legacy is the Loomis Chaffee School, a college preparatory school.

== Early life and education ==
Loomis was born in Windsor, Connecticut, on January 5, 1825. His parents were Colonel James Loomis and Abigail (nee Sherwood Chaffee) Loomis, both of English descent. His father, a farmer, merchant and miller, was also a native of Windsor. He also served for many years as colonel of the First Regiment of Connecticut State Militia. The first of the Loomis family in America was Joseph Loomis from Braintree, Essex County, England. He came to Boston in the ship Susan and Ellen in 1638. In 1640, he bought a large tract of land in Hartford County, Connecticut, where the Farmington River enters the Connecticut River at the site of the city of Windsor.

John Loomis was named after a prominent officer in the colonial forces of the Connecticut Colony who was distinguished for his gallantry during the French and Indian War. His mother was from Greenfield Hill, Connecticut, and was descended from a family of high social standing. Loomis attended public school in Connecticut and received initial business training working at his father's store as a teenager.

== Business career ==
At 23, Loomis took over an existing lumber concern in Milwaukee, Wisconsin. The business was successful and in 1852 Loomis moved it to Chicago, where he formed a partnership, Loomis & Ludington, with James Ludington of Milwaukee. The partnership succeeded until 1861, when Loomis entered the American Civil War. In 1864, he left the army and returned to Chicago to find his lumber business had been mishandled and destroyed by its managers. Still interested in sales, he became a commission merchant. He prospered and later became a partner with John McLaren, forming John Mason Loomis & Company. For many years, his company on South Water Street was the leading lumber firm in the city.

In 1869 the Pere Marquette Lumber Company was formed with Loomis as treasurer. He, assisted by others in the Marquette Co., was instrumental in moving the Mason County Michigan county seat from Lincoln to Ludington. Loomis and Delos L. Filer pledged $1,000 towards a new county office building which was completed in 1874. In 1879, Loomis became the president of Pere Marquette.

Loomis's other interests included experiments with salt mining, when he determined that the brine of flowing salt water from a well could be distilled to produce usable salt. The Pere Marquette Lumber Company pioneered burning scrap lumber to operate salt distilleries. Other local entrepreneurs copied Loomis's techniques, establishing the salt industry in northwestern Michigan. The village of Pere Marquette benefited from these local lumber and salt industries and developed into the city of Ludington.

== Military service ==
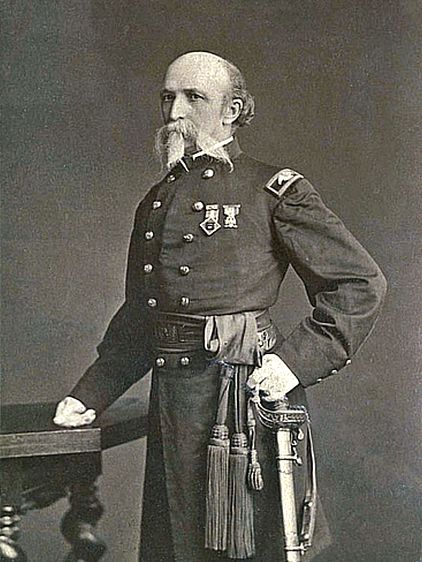
Colonel John M. Loomis

When he was 18, Loomis became a captain in the Connecticut state militia. He was then appointed as a midshipman in the United States Navy, but opportunities for active service and travel were rare so he resigned. He then joined the United States Merchant Marine, traveling to China and other Asian countries, returning to Chicago in 1845. He then moved to Milwaukee.

When the American Civil War began in 1861, Loomis was a first lieutenant in the Chicago Light Guard (Note: a company in the 1st Regiment, Illinois State Militia, founded by Philip Wadsworth) with a reputation as a devoted and skilled military leader. This prompted Governor Richard Yates to request that Loomis take command of a regiment for service in the field. Yates' request was supported by several influential men in Chicago, and Loomis accepted. In August 1861, Loomis took over the 26th Illinois Infantry Regiment as colonel.

Loomis's regiment participated in the Battle of Island Number Ten, the Battle of Iuka, the Siege of Corinth, the Siege of Vicksburg, the Battle of Jackson, Mississippi, the Second Battle of Chattanooga and the Battle of Farmington, Tennessee. The St. Louis Globe-Democrat reported that he acquitted himself well as he rallied his men at the Second Battle of Chattanooga. He led the 26th at the Battle of Missionary Ridge. One memorial tribute described the regiment's effort as a great achievement for a group of citizen soldiers.

During his army career he commanded the First Brigade – Second Division of the Army of the Mississippi (1862); Second Brigade – Second Division (1862), First Brigade – First Division (1863), and First Brigade – Fourth Division (1863–64) of the Army of the Tennessee. He also commanded the First Division, 16th Army Corps of the Army of the Tennessee.

Loomis hoped for promotion to brigadier general and was recommended twice by General Ulysses S. Grant and once by General William T. Sherman for the post, but was turned down. Loomis also served with the 16th Corps Support Group. Loomis fought in 57 battles and skirmishes and marched with his men for more than 6,900 miles (11,100 km). He resigned his commission on April 30, 1864, due to fatigue. He returned to Chicago and became a prominent real estate owner who was also active in support of veteran affairs.

After the war, Colonel Loomis became a Companion of the Illinois Commandery of the Military Order of the Loyal Legion of the United States.

== Personal life ==
In 1849, Loomis married Mary Hunt, the daughter of Milo Hunt of Chenango County, New York. Loomis and his three brothers and one sister all lost their children during their lifetimes, leading them to form the Loomis Institute, helping educate young boys and girls. In 1874, they incorporated the Institute into the Loomis Chaffee School, a New England boarding and day school in Windsor, Connecticut. For its first 40 years, the school offered free education to those between twelve and twenty years of age.

Loomis was on the board of directors of the Chicago Relief and Aid Society, a charity for those left homeless and destitute after the fire of 1871. He donated money and time to the society and similar charities for twenty years. Loomis helped organize George H. Thomas Post Number 5 of the Grand Army of the Republic. In 1879, Loomis founded the Illinois Commandery of MOLLUS, the Military Order of the Loyal Legion of the United States, and became its commander in 1884, succeeding Philip Sheridan. Loomis also served as treasurer in 1879 and head of the U.S. Volunteers from 1880 to 1883

He was a devout Episcopalian and active in Chicago's Grace Episcopal Church, where he was also a prominent donor. Loomis was a Republican. Although not considered a politician by historians Hyland MacGrath and George Irving Reed, Loomis was active in the selection of candidates to governmental offices. Loomis retired in 1885. He built a home at 55 Lake Shore Drive, in Chicago, dying in that city on August 2, 1900, and is interred at Rosehill Cemetery.

== Legacy ==
In 1910, his widow left over $1.1 million (equivalent to $38,700,000 in 2025) as an endowment to the "Loomis Institute" for charitable purposes.
