= Grace Episcopal Church (Robbinston, Maine) =

Historic church in Maine, United States

- U.S. National Register of Historic Places
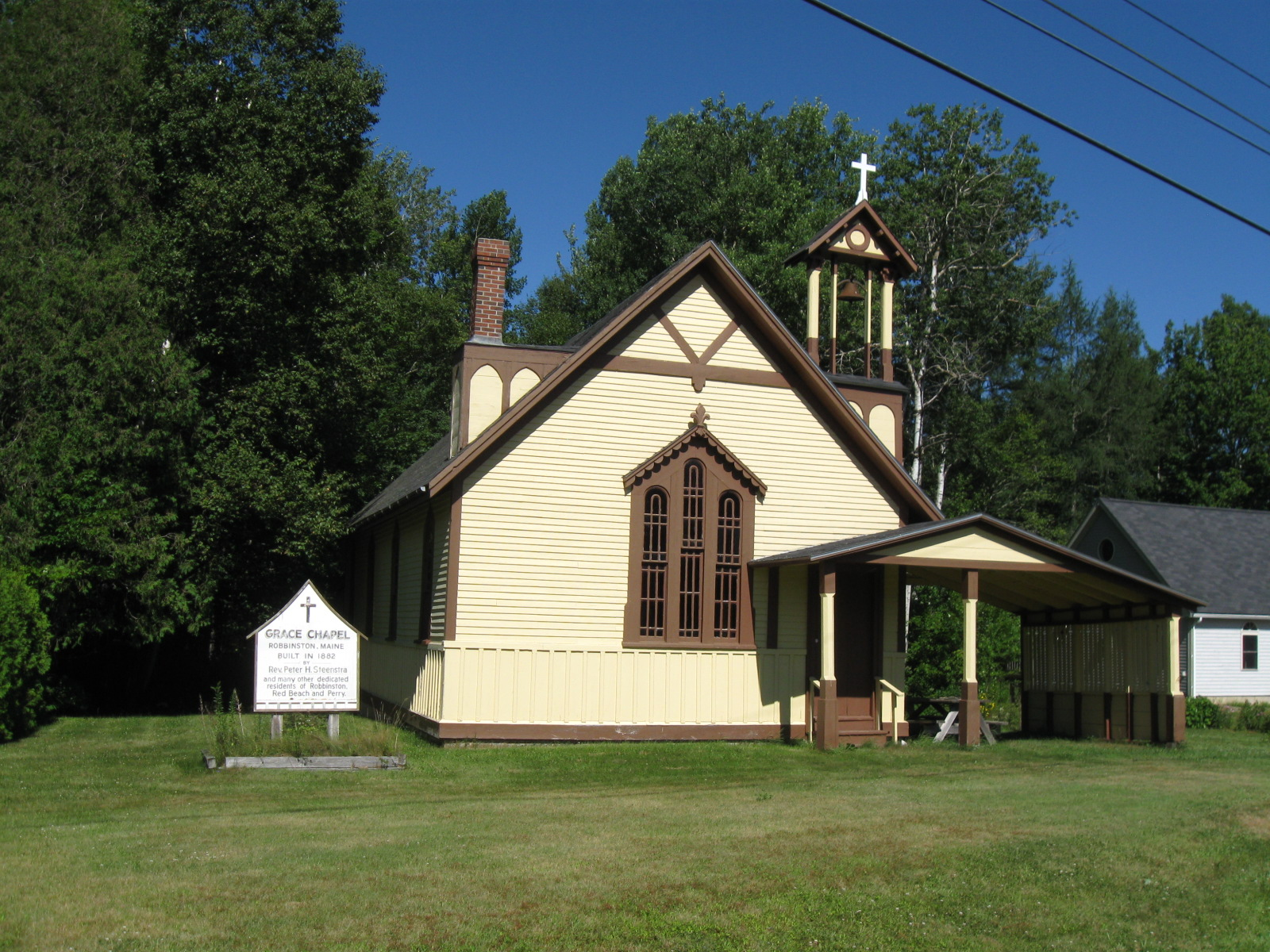

- Location within Maine Location within the United States
- Location: U.S. Route 1 half a mile northwest of its junction with 3rd Street; Robbinston, Maine
- Coordinates: 45.08723°N 67.11425°W
- Area: less than one acre
- Built: 1882
- Architectural style: Carpenter Gothic
- NRHP reference No.: 01000816
- Added to NRHP: August 7, 2001

The former Grace Episcopal Church is an historic Episcopal church located on U.S. Route 1 half a mile northwest of its junction with 3rd Street in Robbinston, Maine, in the United States. Built in 1882, it is one of a series of churches along Maine's coast that was funded by summer residents, and is a fine vernacular expression of Carpenter Gothic architecture. It was listed on the National Register of Historic Places in 2001. It is now the museum of the Robbinston Historical Society.

== Description and history ==
The former Grace Episcopal Church is set on the east side of US 1, in the dispersed rural village of Robbinston, overlooking the St. Croix River. It is a single story wood frame structure, finished with a combination of clapboards and board-and-batten siding. Basically rectangular in shape, it has a porte-cochere to the right, whose broad low-pitch gabled roof extends to cover the main entrance. The front (west-facing) gable end is distinguished by Stick style woodwork at the peak, and a three-part round-arch window at the center, framed by a bargeboard surround. Triangular parapet walls present dormer-like projections from the gable roof, the left one topped by a brick chimney, the right one by an open belfry, which has a pair of chamfered posts supporting the crosspiece from which the bell is suspended. The belfry is topped by a cross-shaped finial.

The church was built in 1882 through the efforts of Dr. Peter Henry Steenstra, a minister from Cambridge, Massachusetts, who was a summer resident of Robbinston, and who had for several summers led religious services in less formal settings. Services ended in 1993, and the church was sold to the historical society in 2000, which uses it as its museum. Although it is not as elaborate as some of Maine's other coastal summer churches (or designed by an architect, as several were), its construction is representative of the trend for such buildings in the late 19th century.

== See also ==
- National Register of Historic Places listings in Washington County, Maine
- Grace Episcopal Church (disambiguation)
