= C. B. Burns =

American baseball player (1879–1968)

C.B. Burns
- Unknown
- Born: May 15, 1879; Bayview, Maryland
- Died: June 6, 1968 (aged 89); Havre de Grace, Maryland
- Batted: Right Threw: Right

MLB debut
- August 19, 1902, for the Baltimore Orioles

Last MLB appearance
- August 19, 1902, for the Baltimore Orioles

MLB statistics
- Batting average: 1.000
- Home runs: 0
- Runs batted in: 0
- Stats at Baseball Reference

Teams
- Baltimore Orioles (1902)

Charles Brittingham Burns (May 15, 1879, in Bayview, Maryland – June 6, 1968, in Havre De Grace, Maryland) played one game in Major League Baseball for the 1902 Baltimore Orioles. In his one at-bat, he hit a single. He batted and threw right-handed. He was brought in for a tryout after playing baseball in Hagerstown, Maryland, and had his one appearance on August 19 as a result, a pinch-hit single in the ninth inning.

He is notable as one of a very few major league players with one at-bat and a perfect 1.000 batting average.

Burns died on June 6, 1968. He was buried at Angel Hill Cemetery in Havre de Grace.

== Sources ==
- Career statistics from Baseball Reference
