= Grace Episcopal Church (Sandusky, Ohio) =

Historic church in Ohio, United States

- U.S. National Register of Historic Places
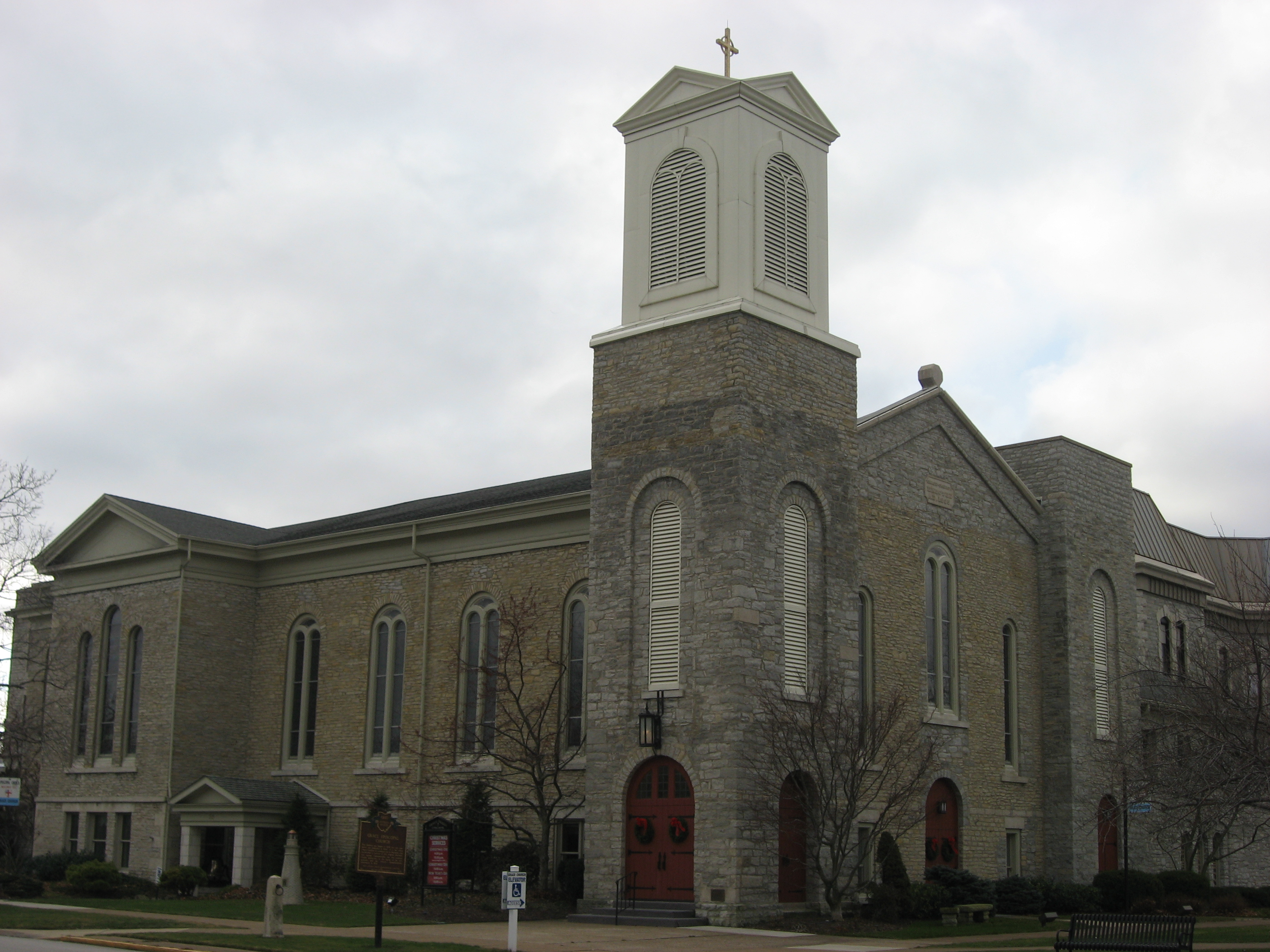
- Front and side of the church

- Location within Ohio Location within the United States
- Location: 315 Wayne St., Sandusky, Ohio
- Coordinates: 41°27′17″N 82°42′34″W
- Area: Less than 1 acre (0.40 ha)
- Built: 1835
- Architectural style: Romanesque Revival
- MPS: Sandusky MRA
- NRHP reference No.: 82001402
- Added to NRHP: October 20, 1982

Grace Episcopal Church is an historic Episcopal church located at 315 Wayne Street in Sandusky, Ohio, in the United States. On October 20, 1982, it was added to the National Register of Historic Places.

The church reported 254 members in 2019 and 226 members in 2023. Plate and pledge income reported for the congregation in 2024 was $127,167. Average Sunday attendance (ASA) in 2024 was 66 persons.

== History ==
Grace Episcopal Church was organized on March 15, 1835. The church building dates from 1843.

== Current use ==
Grace Episcopal Church is an active parish in the Episcopal Diocese of Ohio. The current priest-in-charge is Rev. Jan Smith Wood.

== See also ==
- List of Registered Historic Places in Erie County, Ohio
- Grace Episcopal Church (disambiguation)
