= Grace Episcopal Church (Chillicothe, Missouri) =

Historic church in Missouri, United States

- Grace Episcopal Church and Building
- U.S. National Register of Historic Places
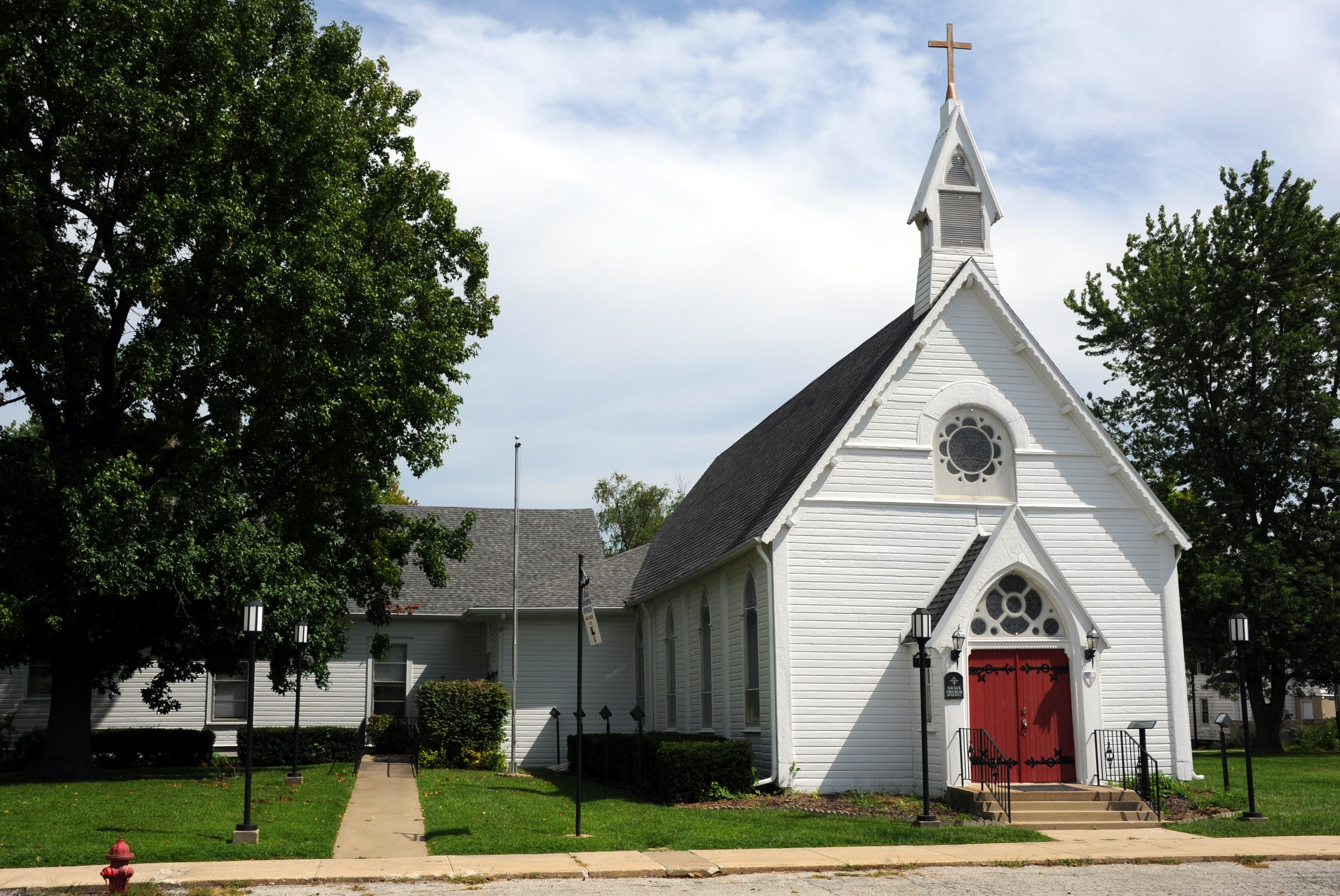

- Location within Missouri Location within the United States
- Location: 421 Elm St. Chillicothe, Missouri
- Coordinates: 39.7915°N 93.5511°W
- Area: 1 acre (0.40 ha)
- Built: 1867
- Built by: J. Beattie, Jacob H. Flower
- Architectural style: Early English Gothic
- NRHP reference No.: 80002375
- Added to NRHP: September 17, 1980

Grace Episcopal Church is a historic Episcopal church in Chillicothe, Livingston County, Missouri. The church was built between 1867 and 1869, and is a one-story, inexpensive prefabricated wooden church patterned after Early English Gothic churches. The church measures approximately 69 feet by 22 feet and is connected to the Andrew Leeper Memorial Parish Hall (1912) by a rectangular foyer.

It was listed on the National Register of Historic Places in 1980.
