= Grace Episcopal Church and Guild Hall (Port Orange, Florida) =

Historic church in Florida, United States

- U.S. National Register of Historic Places
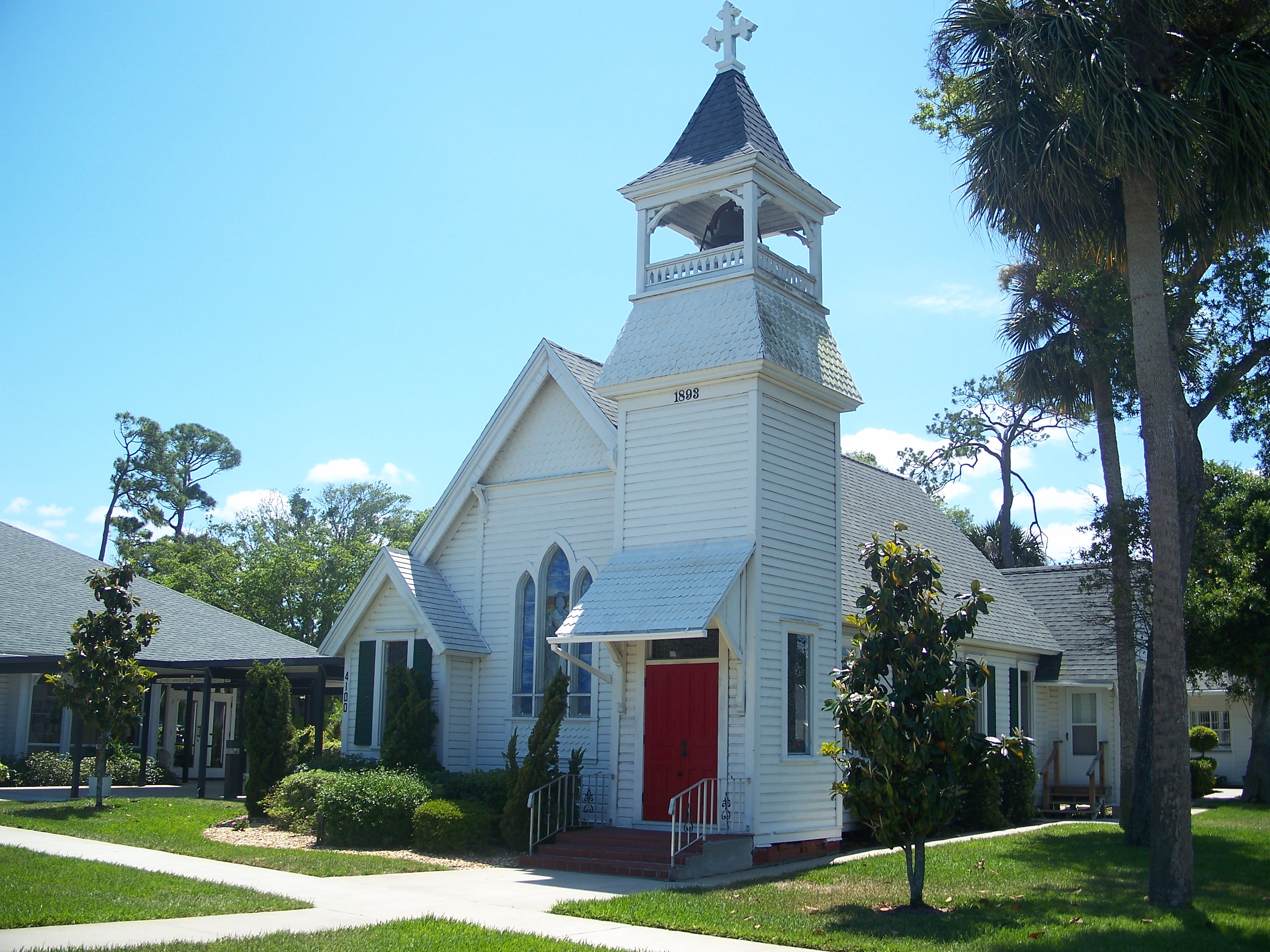

- Location within Volusia County
- Location: 4100 Ridgewood Avenue; Port Orange, Florida
- Coordinates: 29°8′30″N 80°59′13″W
- Area: less than one acre
- Built: church 1893 guild hall 1897
- Architectural style: Carpenter Gothic
- MPS: Port Orange MPS
- NRHP reference No.: 98000058
- Added to NRHP: February 5, 1998

Grace Episcopal Church and Guild Hall is a historic site in Port Orange, Florida, United States. It is located at 4100 Ridgewood Avenue. On February 5, 1998, it was added to the U.S. National Register of Historic Places.
