= Havre de Grace Historic District =

Historic district in Maryland, United States

- U.S. National Register of Historic Places
- U.S. Historic district
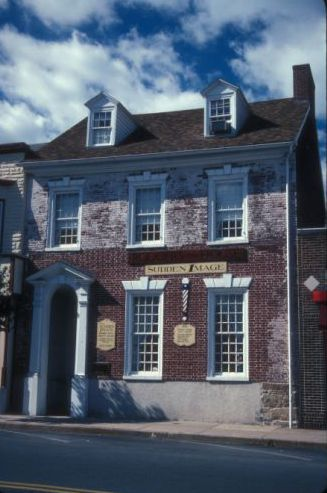
- Townhouse in Havre de Grace Historic District

- Location within Maryland Location within the United States
- Location: Roughly bounded by Chesapeake, Bay, Susquehanna River, US 40, Stokes, Juniata and Superior Sts., Havre de Grace, Maryland
- Coordinates: 39°32′49″N 76°5′29″W
- Area: 344 acres (139 ha)
- Built: 1795
- Architect: Multiple
- Architectural style: Late Victorian, Greek Revival, Federal
- NRHP reference No.: 82002815
- Added to NRHP: March 25, 1982

Havre de Grace Historic District is a national historic district at Havre de Grace, Harford County, Maryland, United States. It is an urban district of approximately a thousand buildings and includes the central business district and most of the residential neighborhoods radiating out of it. The buildings date primarily from the 19th and early 20th centuries.

It was added to the National Register of Historic Places in 1987.
