= Grace Episcopal Church (Mount Clemens, Michigan) =

- Location within Michigan
- 42°35′36″N 82°52′47″W
- Location: 115 South Main Street; Mount Clemens, Michigan
- Country: United States
- Denomination: Episcopal

Architecture
- Heritage designation: Michigan State Historic Site
- Designated: 1975
- Architectural type: Gothic Revival
- Years built: 1870–1871

Grace Episocopal Church is an Episcopal church located in Mount Clemens, Michigan. It was designated a Michigan State Historic Site in 1975. The church is part of the Episcopal Diocese of Michigan.

In 2018, the church reported 385 members; in 2023, it reported 142 members. No membership statistics were reported in 2024 national parochial reports. Plate and pledge financial support reported by the church in 2024 was $232,337. Average Sunday Attendance (ASA) reported in 2024 was 60 persons. This was a relative decrease from ASA of 116 persons reported in 2015.

The church's rector is the Rev. Steven Steinberger-Domienik.
