= Grace Episcopal Church (Spring Hill, Tennessee) =

Historic church in Tennessee, United States

- U.S. National Register of Historic Places
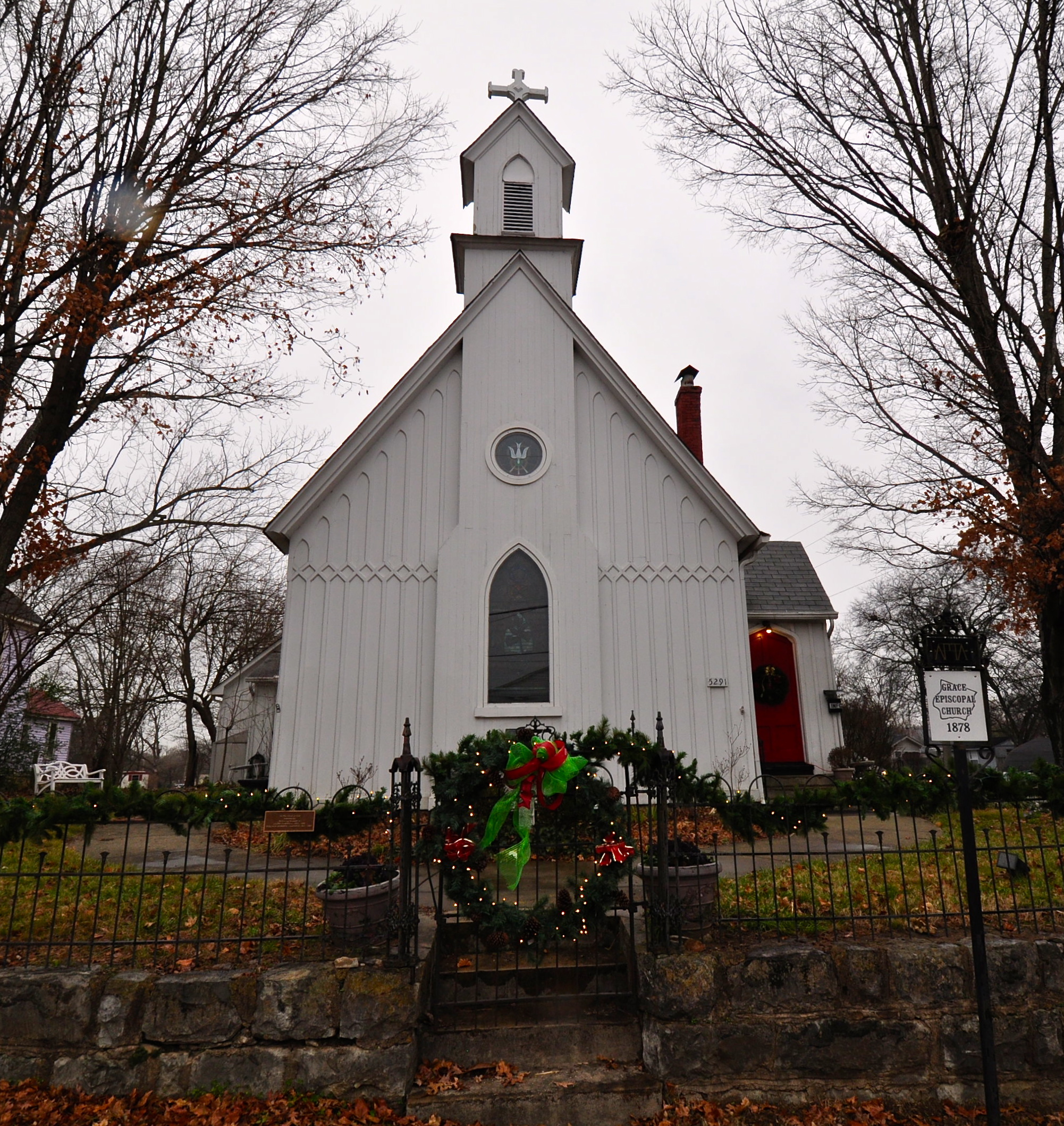
- Grace Episcopal Church, December 2013.

- Location within Tennessee Location within the United States
- Location: U.S. 31, Spring Hill, Tennessee
- Coordinates: 35°45′9″N 86°55′45″W
- Area: 1 acre (0.40 ha)
- Built: 1876
- Architect: P. J. Williamson
- Architectural style: Carpenter Gothic
- NRHP reference No.: 76001789
- Added to NRHP: May 17, 1976

Grace Episcopal Church is a historic church on U.S. 31 in Spring Hill, Tennessee.

The Carpenter Gothic church building was constructed in 1876–7 and dedicated in 1878 by Charles T. Quintard, Bishop of the Episcopal Diocese of Tennessee. Nashville architect P. J. Williamson designed the building, which was completed at a cost of $1,800. The building interior contains a small narthex, a nave that seats about 100 people, a chancel and altar, and a small sacristy. There is a single belfry with one bell that is labeled “England 1839.”

The church was added to the National Register of Historic Places in 1976.
