= Grace Episcopal Church (Washington, D.C.) =

Historic church in Washington, D.C., United States

- Grace Protestant Episcopal Church
- U.S. National Register of Historic Places
- U.S. National Historic Landmark District – Contributing property
- D.C. Inventory of Historic Sites
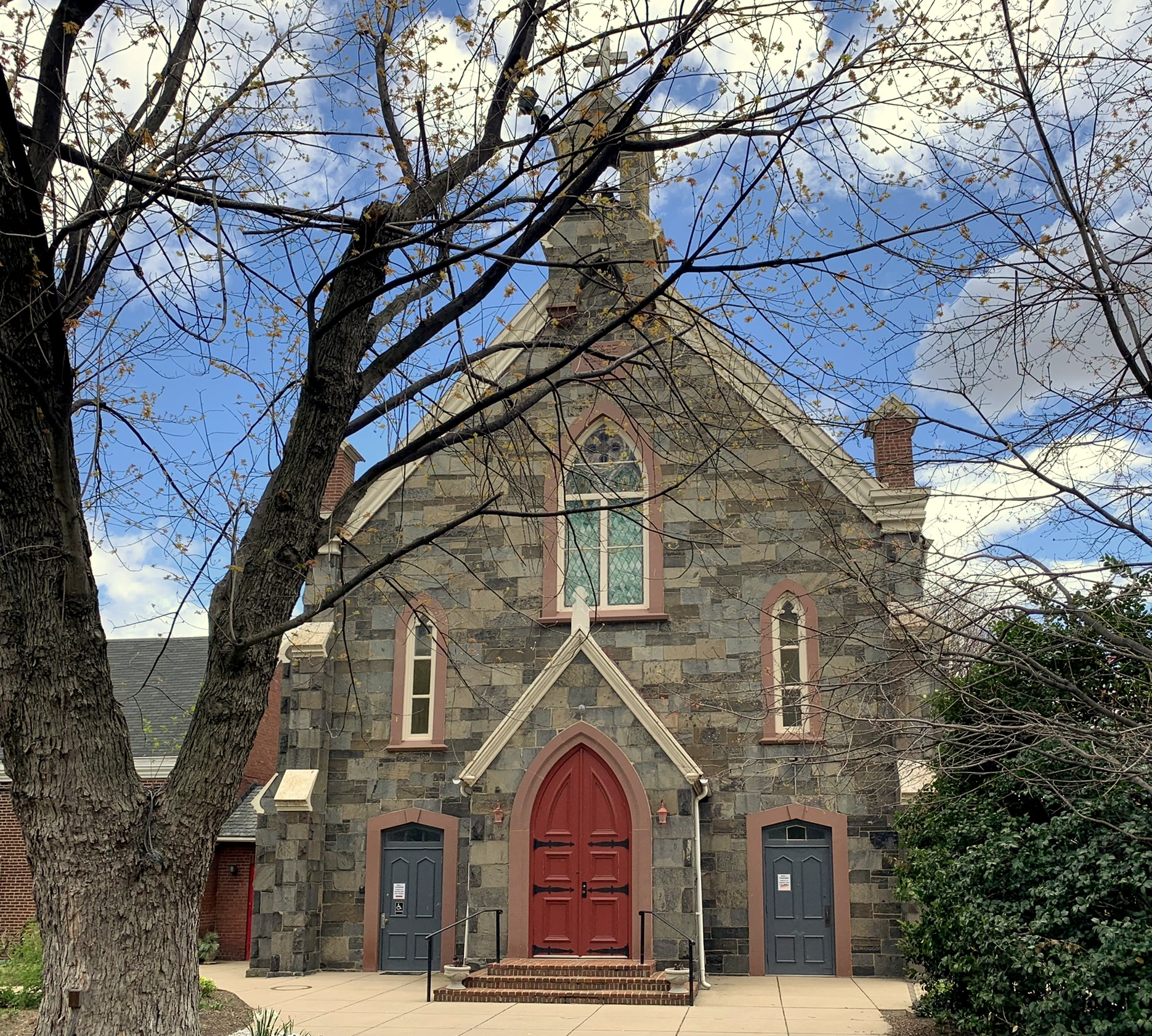
- Grace Protestant Episcopal Church in 2022

- Location within Washington, D.C.
- Location: 1041 Wisconsin Avenue, NW; Washington, D.C.
- Coordinates: 38°54′13″N 77°3′44″W
- Built: 1867
- Architectural style: Gothic Revival
- NRHP reference No.: 71001001

Significant dates
- Added to NRHP: May 06, 1971
- Designated DCIHS: November 8, 1964

Grace Episcopal Church, built in 1867, is an historic Episcopal church located at 1041 Wisconsin Avenue, NW, in the Georgetown neighborhood of Washington, D.C. Historically known as Grace Protestant Episcopal Church, it was added under that name to the National Register of Historic Places on May 6, 1971. It is also known as Mission Church for Canal Boatmen.

Grace Church is an active parish in the Episcopal Diocese of Washington. The Reverend David C. Wacaster is the current rector. The church reported 375 members in 2015 and 284 members in 2023; no membership statistics were reported in 2024 parochial reports. Plate and pledge income reported for the congregation in 2024 was $295,748. Average Sunday attendance (ASA) in 2024 was 42 persons.

== See also ==
- List of Registered Historic Places in the District of Columbia
