= Grace United Methodist Church (St. Augustine, Florida) =

Historic church in Florida, United States

- U.S. National Register of Historic Places
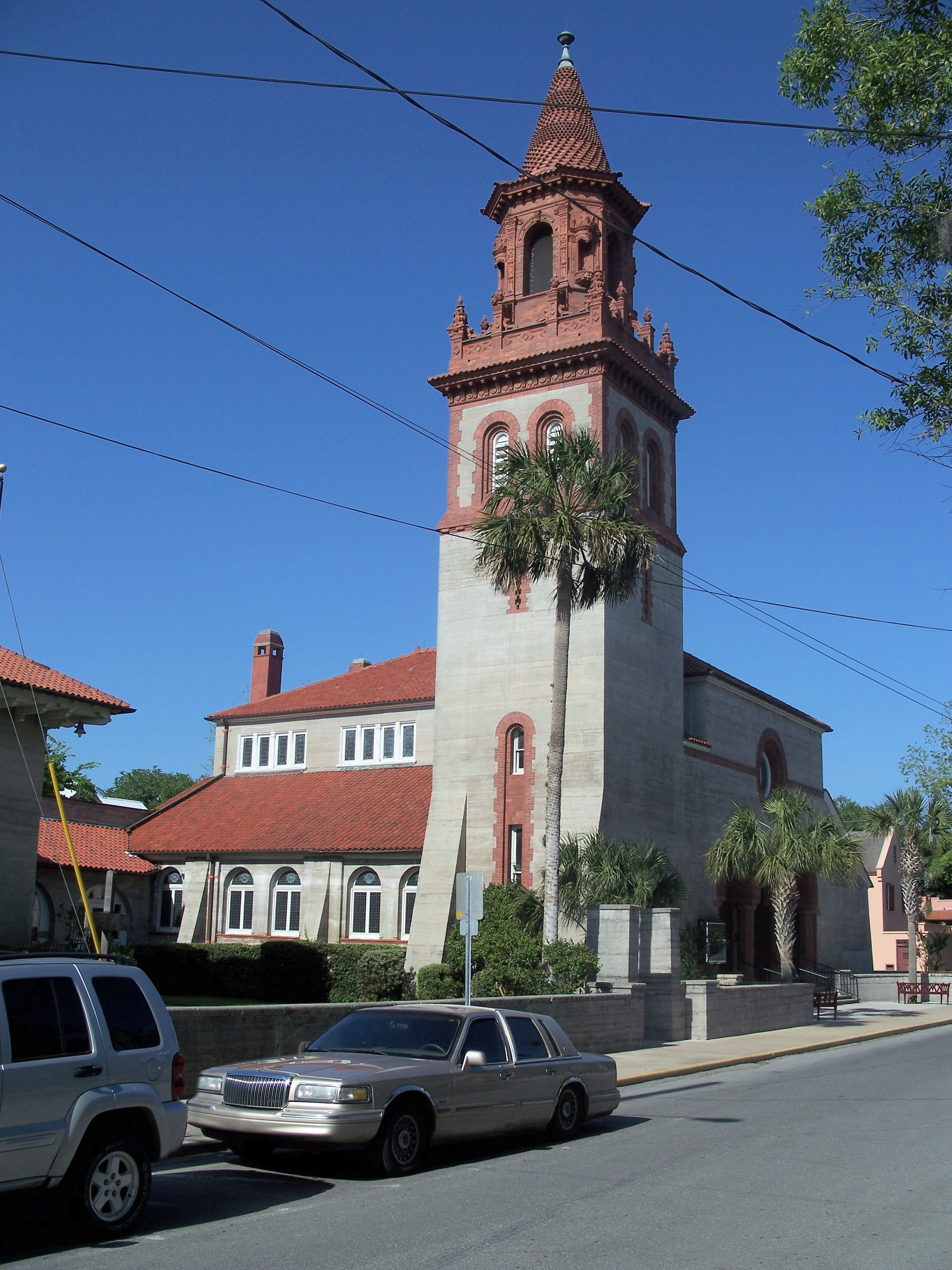
- Location: St. Augustine, Florida
- Coordinates: 29°53′42″N 81°18′54″W
- Architect: Carrere and Hastings
- Architectural style: Spanish Renaissance Revival with Moorish elements
- NRHP reference No.: 79003132
- Added to NRHP: November 29, 1979

Grace United Methodist Church is a historic church donated to the people of St. Augustine, Florida, by American industrialist Henry Morrison Flagler. It is located at 8 Carrera Street. Built within a one-year span (from 1886 to 1887), it was added to the U.S. National Register of Historic Places on November 29, 1979, for its architectural significance and as an example of community planning.

== History ==
Henry Flagler set his sights on building the Hotel Alcazar across the street from the Hotel Ponce de Leon, but this site was already occupied by Olivet Methodist Episcopal Church, built in 1884. Flagler offered the trustees of the church a new plot of land and to pay the construction costs for a new church structure, which they accepted. Flagler gave them a plot of land behind his first hotel, the Hotel Ponce de Leon, at the northwest corner of Carrera and Cordova Streets. Construction on the church and an attached parsonage began in 1886 and was completed the following year. On January 1, 1888, the first service was held in the new church, named Grace Methodist Episcopal Church, and it was dedicated later in January by Bishop W.F. Mallelieu.

In total, the church's construction cost about $85,000. Just like the Hotel Ponce de Leon, the church was designed by John M. Carrere and Thomas Hastings, of Carrere and Hastings architecture firm in New York, and constructed by contractors James A. McGuire and Joseph E. McDonald. It was built of poured concrete, an underused building material and process at the time, and was designed to complement the other Flagler buildings in St. Augustine with a Spanish Renaissance Revival architectural style. The concrete also contained shell aggregate and sand in order to withstand the sometimes harsh physical environment of coastal Florida. The red Spanish tile and terracotta designs that appear on the door and on the church's tower are consistent with Spanish Renaissance style. The sanctuary was adorned with Louis Comfort Tiffany stained glass windows, just like the Ponce de Leon.

In 1947, a home across the street was purchased to serve as the church's parsonage, and the old parsonage was converted into an educational building for Sunday school classes and other church activities. Much of the interior was remodeled in the late 1950s. Some of the updates undertaken at this time included refinishing the walls and woodwork, remodeling the chancel and choir loft, rewiring and adding new light fixtures, installing a heating and air conditioning system, and installing new pews. The Tiffany windows remain.

In 2011, Grace UMC merged with Christ Church, another Methodist church in St. Augustine.
