= Eliot Unitarian Chapel =

Historic church in Kirkwood, Missouri, United States

- Grace Episcopal Church
- U.S. National Register of Historic Places
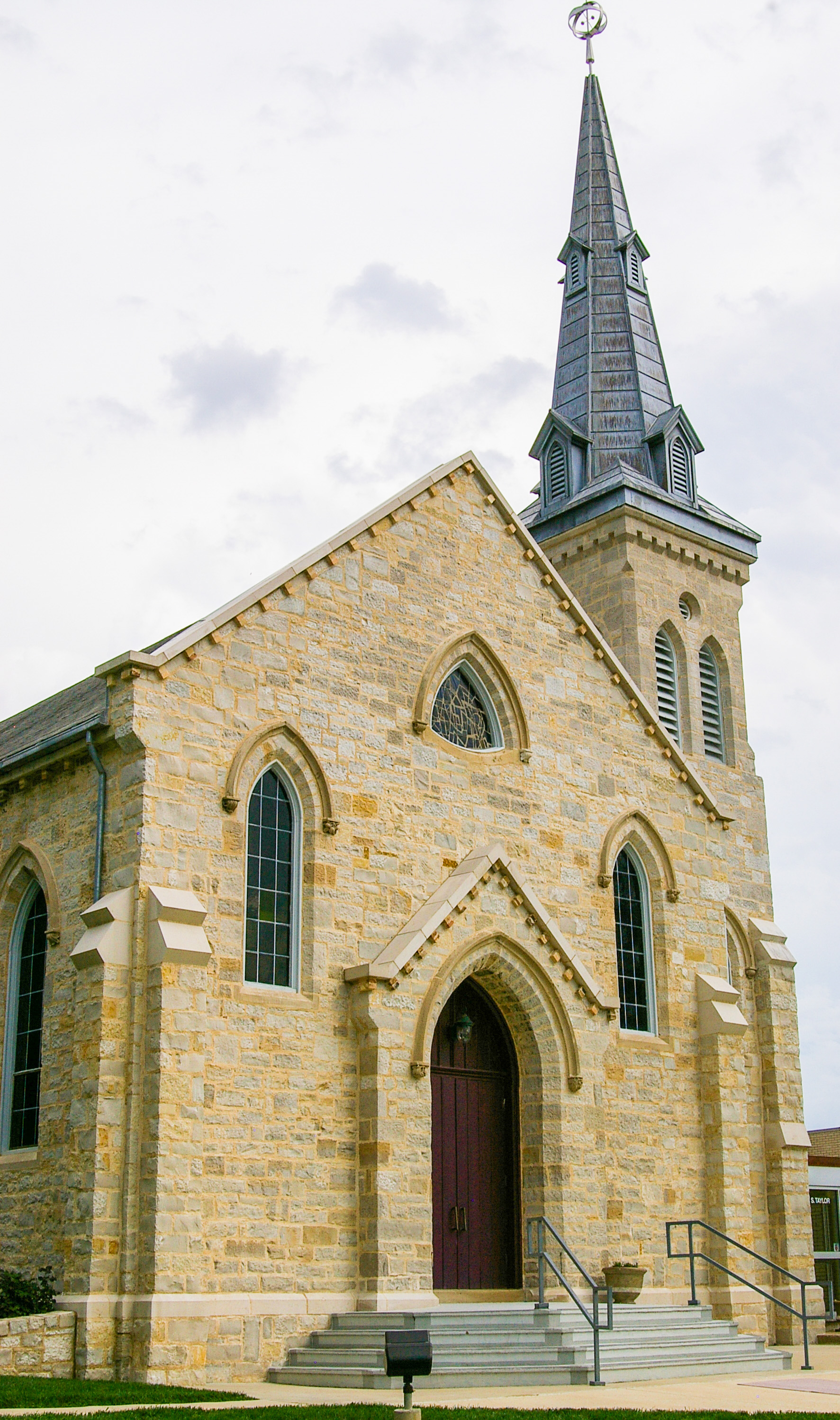
- Grace Episcopal Church in 2012

- Location within Missouri Location within the United States
- Location: 100 S Taylor Ave., Kirkwood, Missouri
- Coordinates: 38°34′51″N 90°24′12″W
- Area: 0.5 acres (0.20 ha)
- Built: 1859
- Architect: Robert S. Mitchell, John Mitchell
- Architectural style: English Gothic Revival
- NRHP reference No.: 82004720
- Added to NRHP: April 12, 1982

Eliot Unitarian Chapel is a historic church building and home to a Unitarian Universalist congregation in Kirkwood, Missouri.

The building was originally constructed for Grace Episcopal Church. It was built in 1859 by architect Robert S. Mitchell in the Gothic Revival style. Patrick McCullough of Kirkwood (formerly Galway, Ireland) worked as stone mason. In 1961, the building was transferred to Eliot Unitarian Chapel, and the Grace Episcopal congregation moved down Argonne Street to another building. The building was added to the National Register of Historic Places in 1982.
