= Grace Episcopal Church (Alexandria, Virginia) =

Grace Church Alexandria
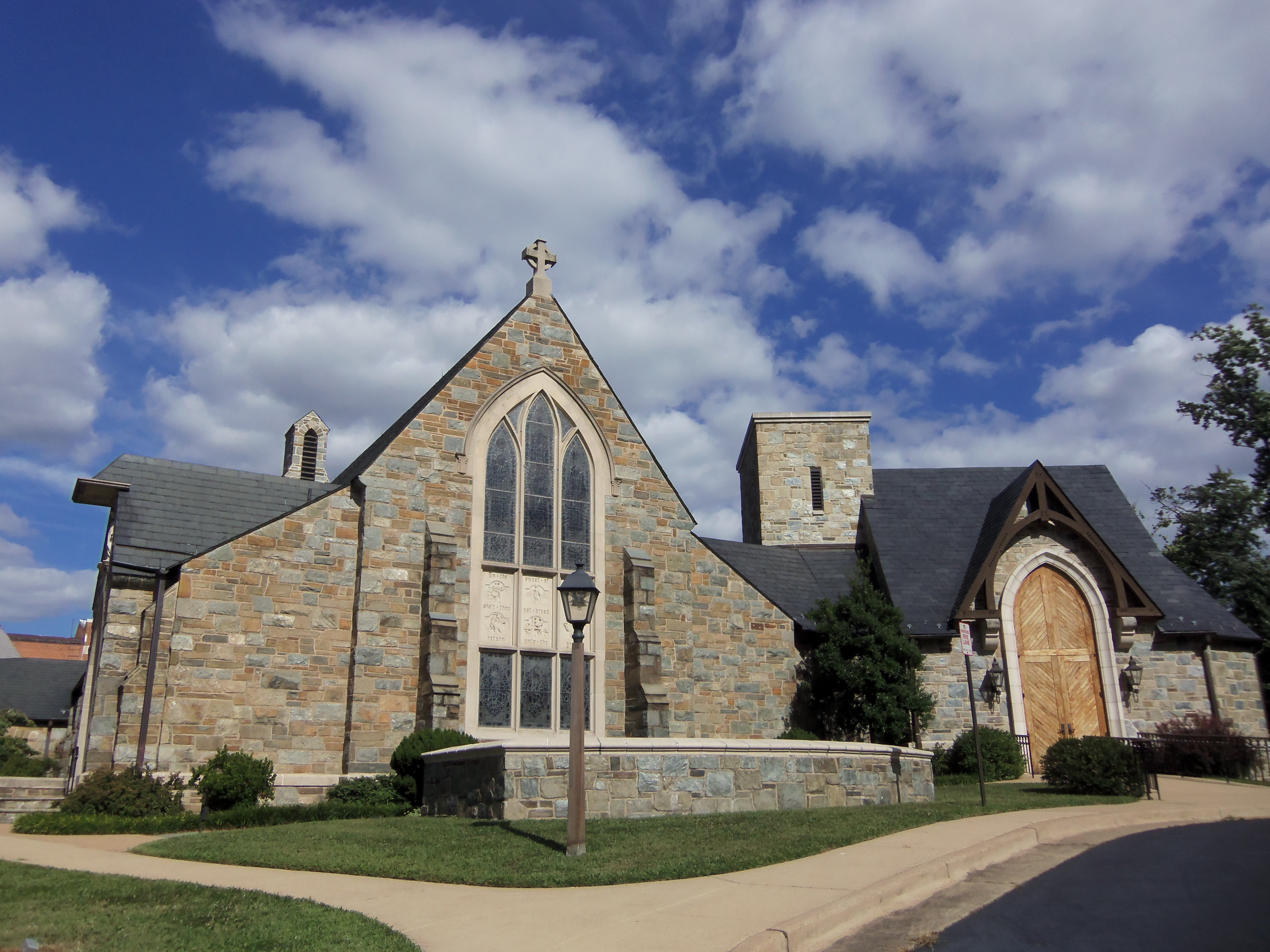
- Grace Church Alexandria
- Location: Russell Road; Alexandria, Virginia
- Country: United States
- Denomination: Episcopal Church
- Website: http://www.gracealex.org

History
- Founded: 1855

Architecture
- Style: Gothic Revival
- Years built: 1948

Administration
- Diocese: Episcopal Diocese of Virginia
- Parish: Grace Church Alexandria

Grace Episcopal Church is an Episcopal Church in Alexandria, Virginia, in the Episcopal Diocese of Virginia. Grace Episcopal Church is a center for worship and fellowship, a school for discipleship and stewardship and a community for healing and outreach. The church reported 926 members in 2015 and 1,049 members in 2023; no membership statistics were reported nationally in 2024 parochial reports. Plate and pledge income reported for the congregation in 2024 was $930,562. Average Sunday attendance (ASA) in 2024 was 220 persons, down from a reported 298 in 2017.

== History ==
The church was founded in 1855 by members of Christ Church and St. Paul's Episcopal Church who wanted to start another Episcopal Church in the expanding West end of Alexandria. The parish's original founding statement says "where all may come without regard for temporal estate, freely and without fee, as brethren come one to another." This was in contrast to the common practice at the time for parishioners to pay a pew tax. During the American Civil War, the church's building was used as a hospital. It was associated with the Oxford Movement.

After World War II, the parish expanded and moved to Alexandria's outskirts, constructing the current church building in gothic style in 1948. A grade school was added in 1959 in the parish education wing.

== Current practice ==
Today, the parish continues to proclaim itself to be a place "where all may worship freely by God's grace." The parish is inclusive, and welcomes all persons. The parish also includes La Gracia, a liturgy for Spanish-speaking members. La Gracia meets on Sunday mornings at 9:00 am in the parish hall.

Grace Episcopal School accepts children ages 3 years old to 5th grade of all faiths and ethnicities.

== Worship ==
Grace Church considers itself to be High Church by tradition. The Eucharist is the center of worship at Grace Church, and is celebrated several times per week. The weekly Eucharist schedule includes services on Sunday at 7:30 am, 9 am, 11:15 am, and 5:00 pm, as well as Tuesday at 6:30 pm, Wednesday mornings at 7:30 am and Thursdays at 12:15 pm. Grace Church uses both Rite I and Rite II from the Book of Common Prayer for worship services, and conducts one 9 am Eucharist on Sundays in Spanish. Worship times vary in the summer, and during the seasons of Lent and Advent.

== Architecture ==
The current church building was constructed in 1948. It has nineteen stained glass windows, including 6 in the Nave. The stained glass windows were made by Willet Hauser Architectural Glass, a leader in the Gothic Revival movement and creator of many of the windows in the National Cathedral, as well as the West Point chapel and other notable buildings. The twelve windows in the Nave portray twelve prominent church figures, including:

- Paul of Tarsus
- Athanasius
- Augustine of Hippo
- Bede
- Dunstan
- Anselm of Canterbury
- Francis of Assisi
- Thomas Aquinas
- William Laud
- Samuel Seabury, first bishop of The Episcopal Church
- Edward Pusey
- Bishop Fabian of the Anglican Diocese of Trinidad and Tobago

The stained glass window in the narthex is a rose window and contains the symbol for the Anglican Communion with the words, "the truth shall make you free."

The pulpit is wood carved, and shows images of five great British evangelists:

- St. Patrick
- St. Margaret of Scotland
- Thomas Becket
- John Donne
- C. S. Lewis
