= Grace Episcopal Church (Huron, South Dakota) =

Historic church in South Dakota, United States

- U.S. National Register of Historic Places
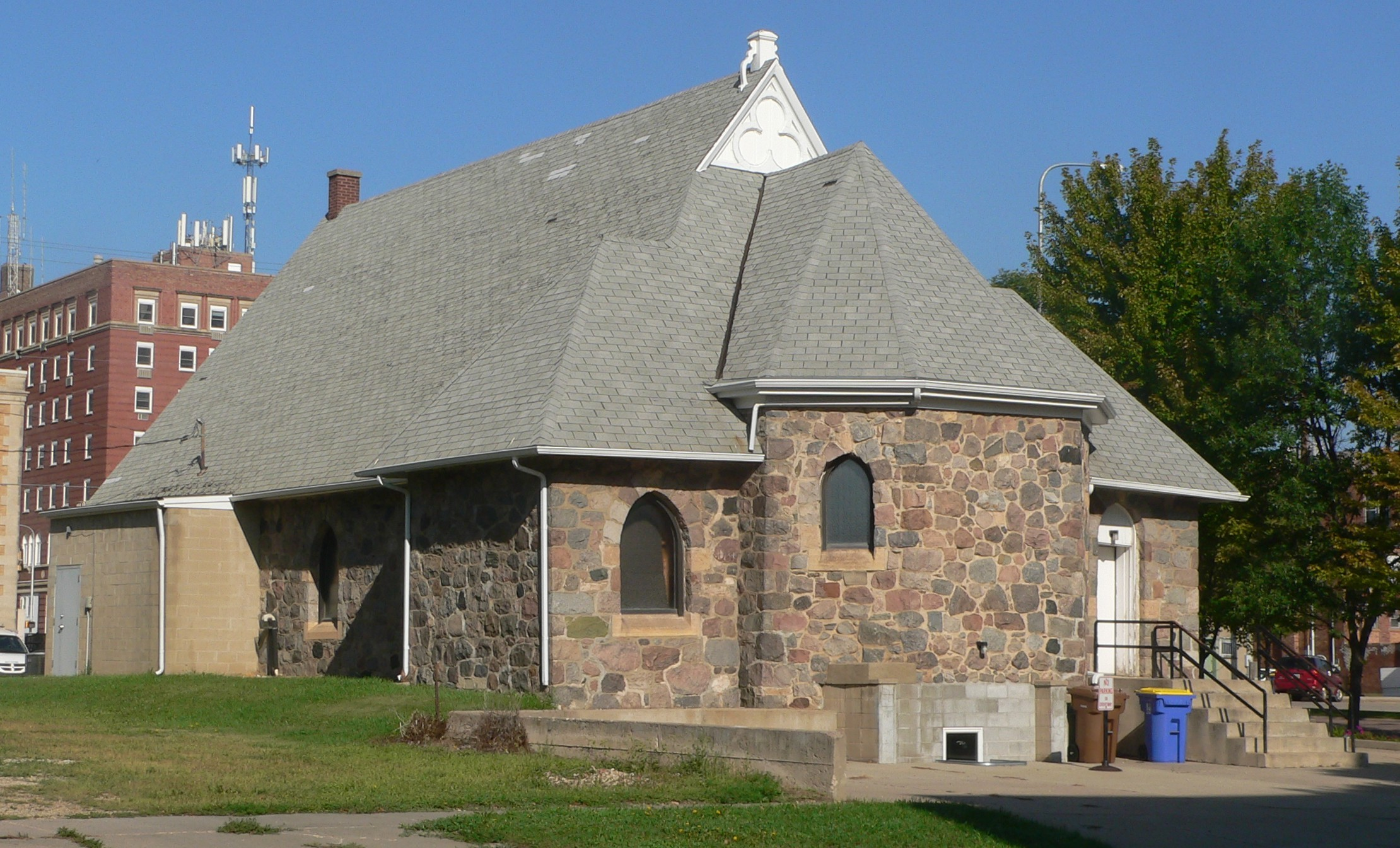

- Location within South Dakota Location within the United States
- Location: Fourth St. and Kansas Ave., SE., Huron, South Dakota
- Coordinates: 44.361819°N 98.212853°W
- Built: 1887
- Architectural style: Late Gothic Revival
- NRHP reference No.: 89000828
- Added to NRHP: July 19, 1989

The current Grace Episcopal Church in Huron, South Dakota was built in 1963. It is located at 16th and McClellan in Huron, South Dakota. The church is part of the Episcopal Diocese of South Dakota.

In 2015, the church reported 83 members; in 2023, it reported 55 members. No membership statistics were reported in 2024 national parochial reports. Plate and pledge financial support reported by the church in 2024 was $155,987. Average Sunday Attendance (ASA) reported in 2024 was 24 persons. This was a relative decrease from ASA of 37 persons reported in 2015.

== Building and history ==
The previous stone church building at 4th and Kansas Street SE was added to the National Register of Historic Places on July 19, 1989. It was deemed significant "a good example of the English Gothic Revival style as commonly used by Episcopalians in the state. It is the oldest extant church building in Huron, South Dakota."
