= Grace United Methodist Church (Des Moines, Iowa) =

Church in Des Moines, Iowa

Grace Methodist Church
- Grace United Methodist Church
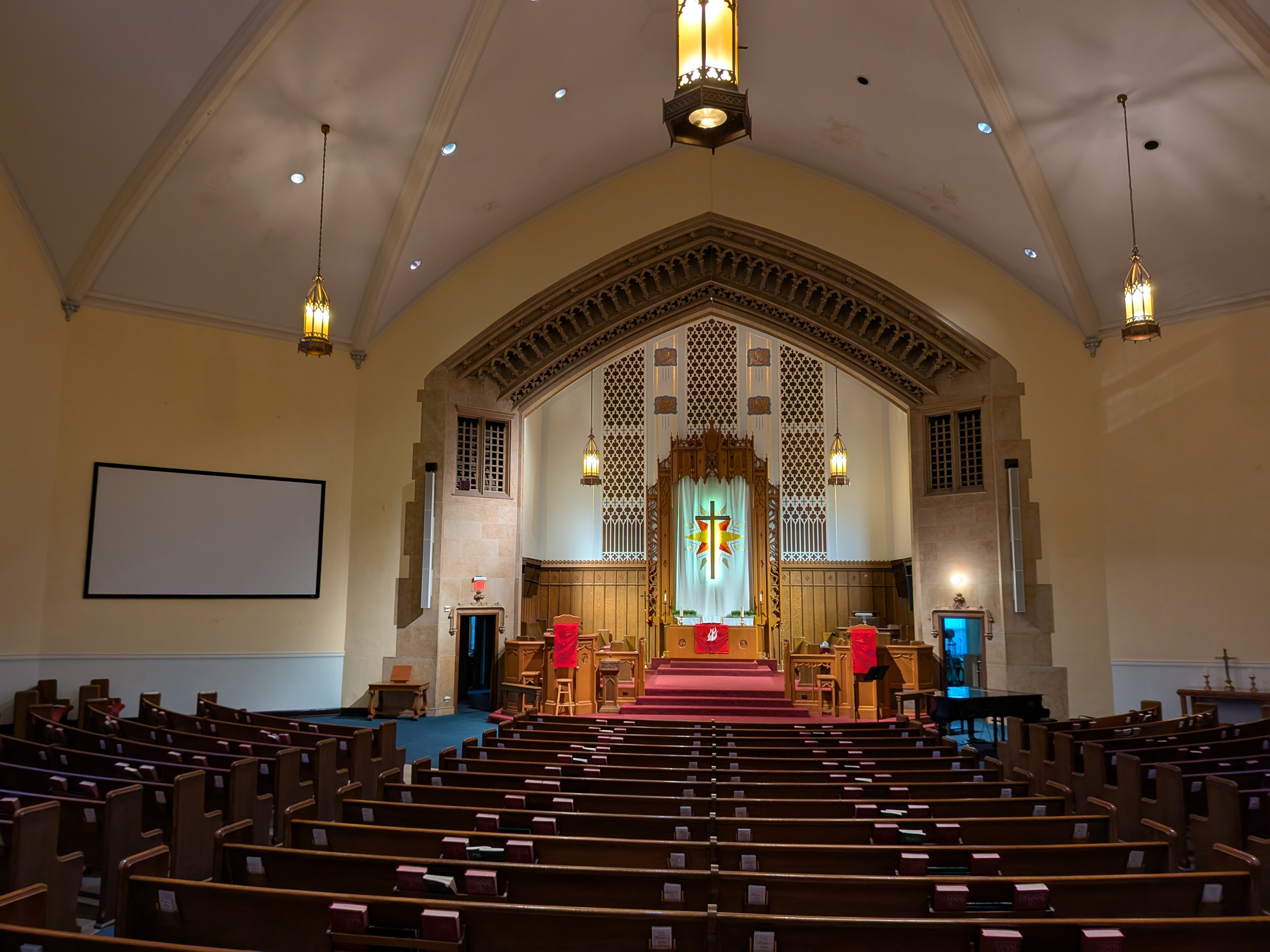
- The church sanctuary

- Location within Iowa Location within the United States
- 41°35′53.12″N 93°40′2.35″W
- Location: 3700 Cottage Grove Ave, Des Moines, IA 50311
- Country: USA
- Denomination: United Methodist Church
- Website: gracedesmoines.org

History
- Former name: Grace Methodist Episcopal Church
- Founded: 1885

Architecture
- Years built: 1885, 1902, 1927, 1957

Grace United Methodist Church is a historic Methodist church in Des Moines, Iowa. It is located one kilometer southwest of Drake University, at 3700 Cottage Grove Avenue. As of 2023, it had 786 members.

== History ==
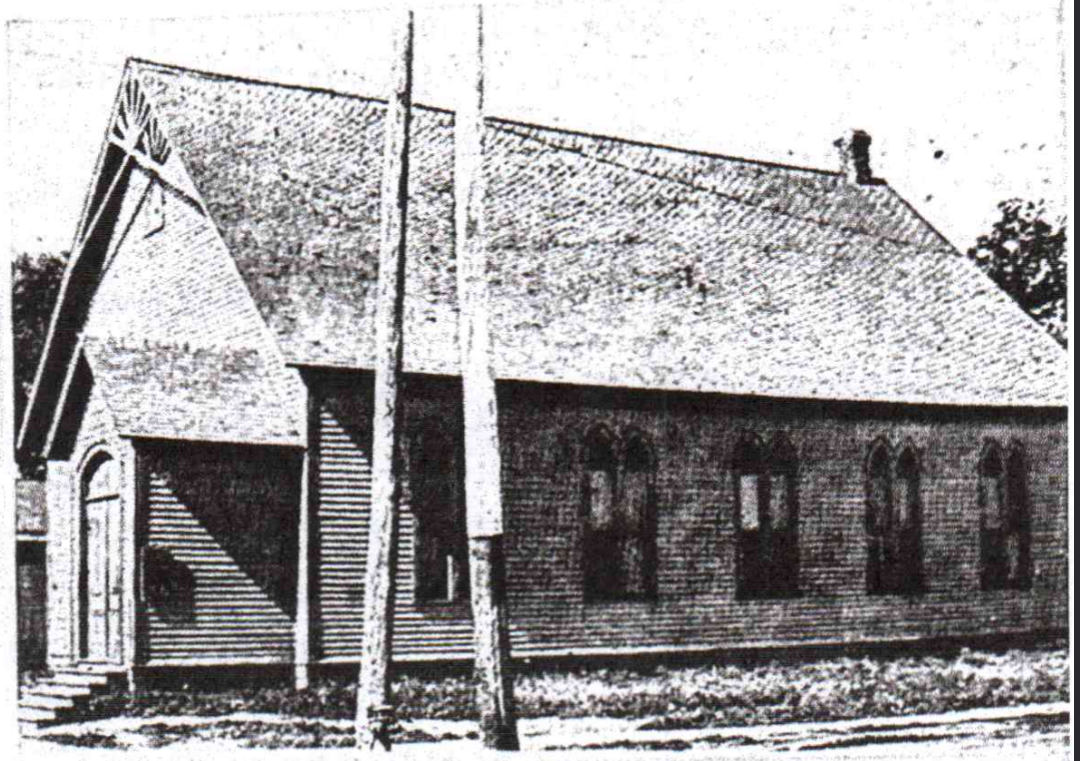
The first church building

In 1885, the church congregation began meeting in a tent, provided by Rev. W. A. Wiseman, located on a vacant lot at the intersection of 19th and Crocker streets. The tent was replaced by a small (40 by 60 foot) frame church building later that year. A second, larger church building which could seat up to 1,400 people, was erected at the same location in 1902. This building was badly damaged by a fire in 1917, and the congregation continued to meet at Drake University and the First Christian Church, until repairs could be made.

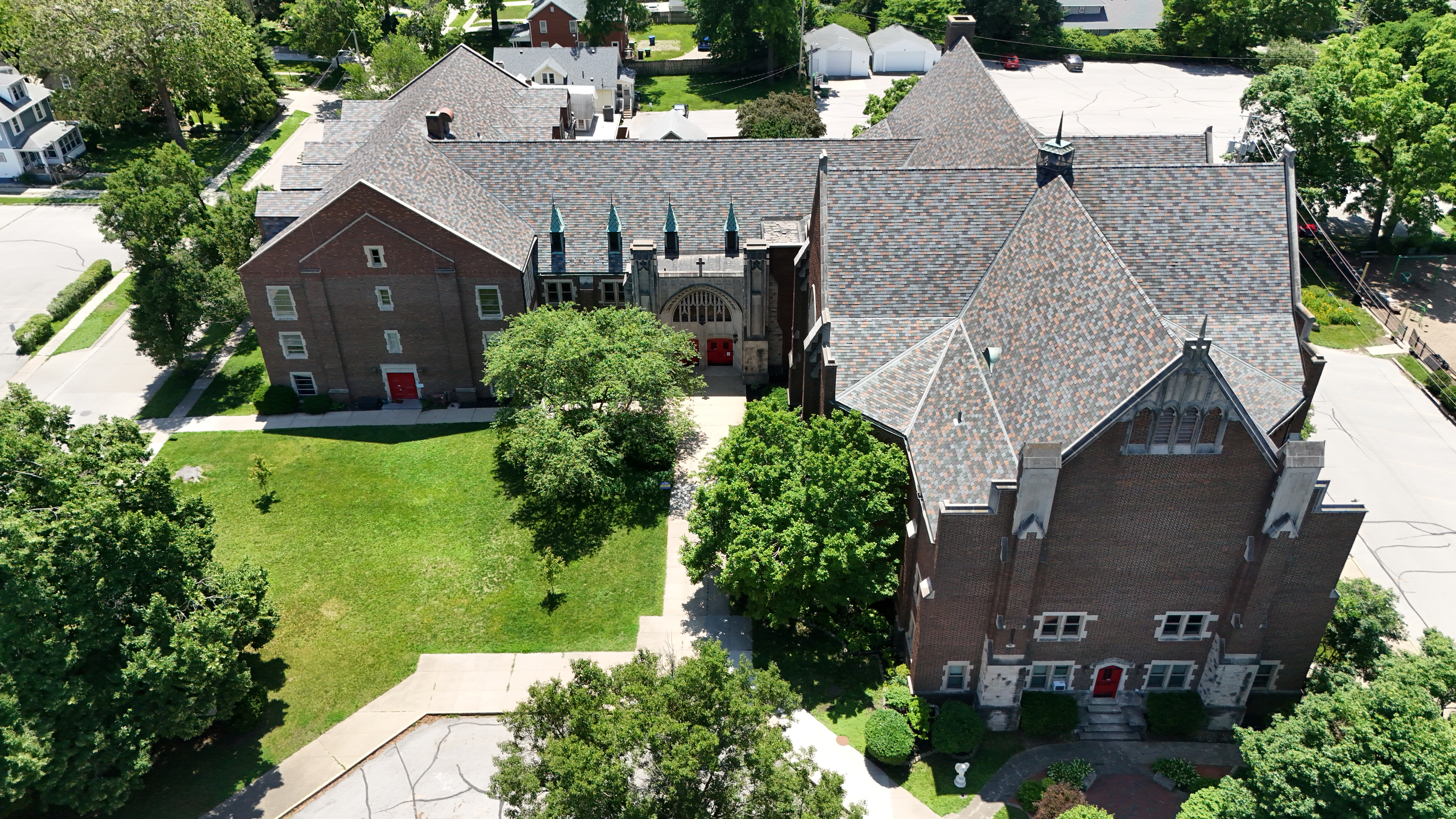
Current building viewed from the north. The main entrance is at the image center.

Construction of the current building began in 1925. Its Cottage Grove location had been the site of a 5-acre experimental farm run by Henry A. Wallace, when he was a teenager. The new church building was dedicated in 1927, and cost $325,000. A 3-story education wing was added to the east side of the building in 1957, at a cost of $239,500.

== Gallery ==
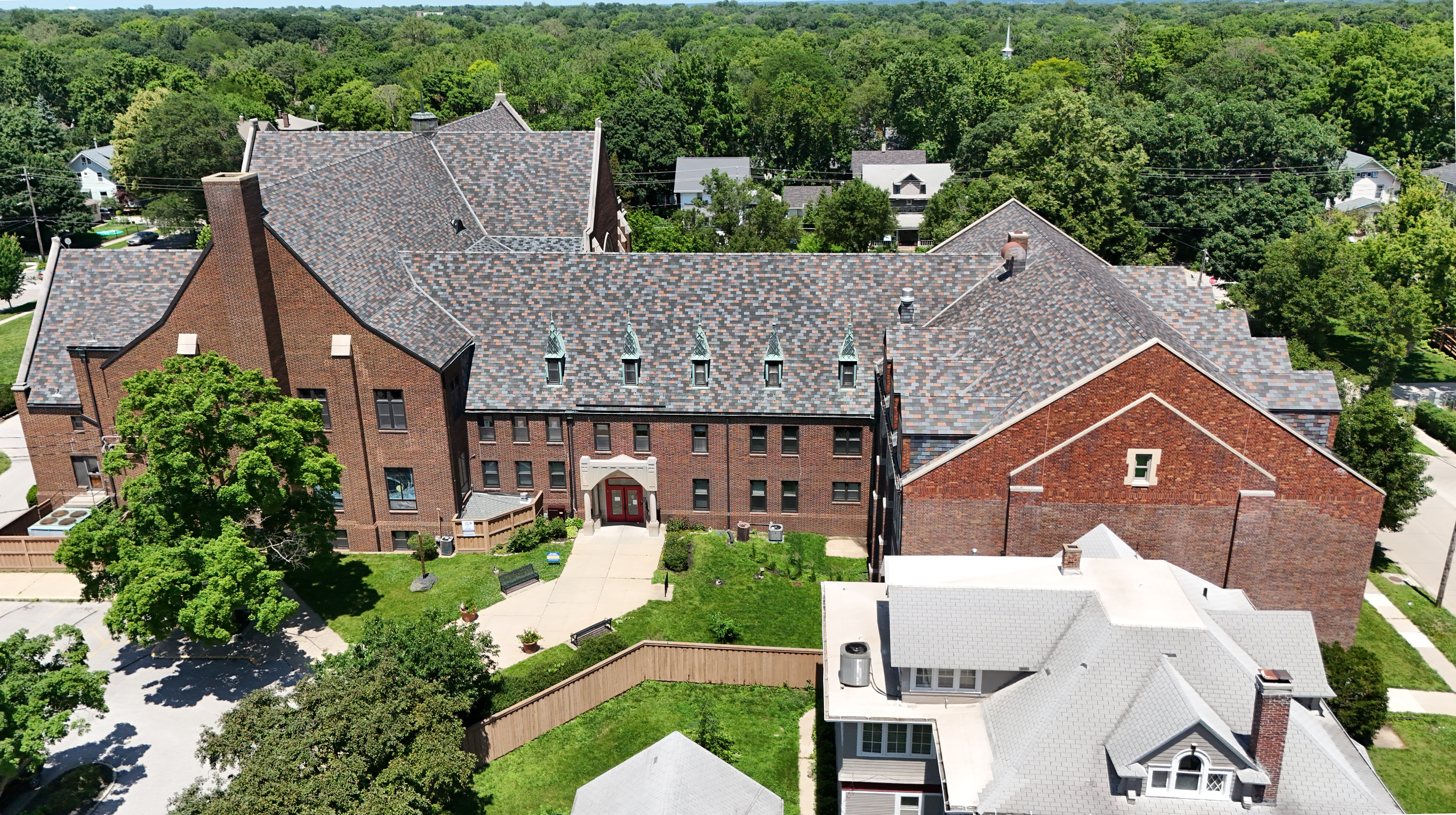
View from the south

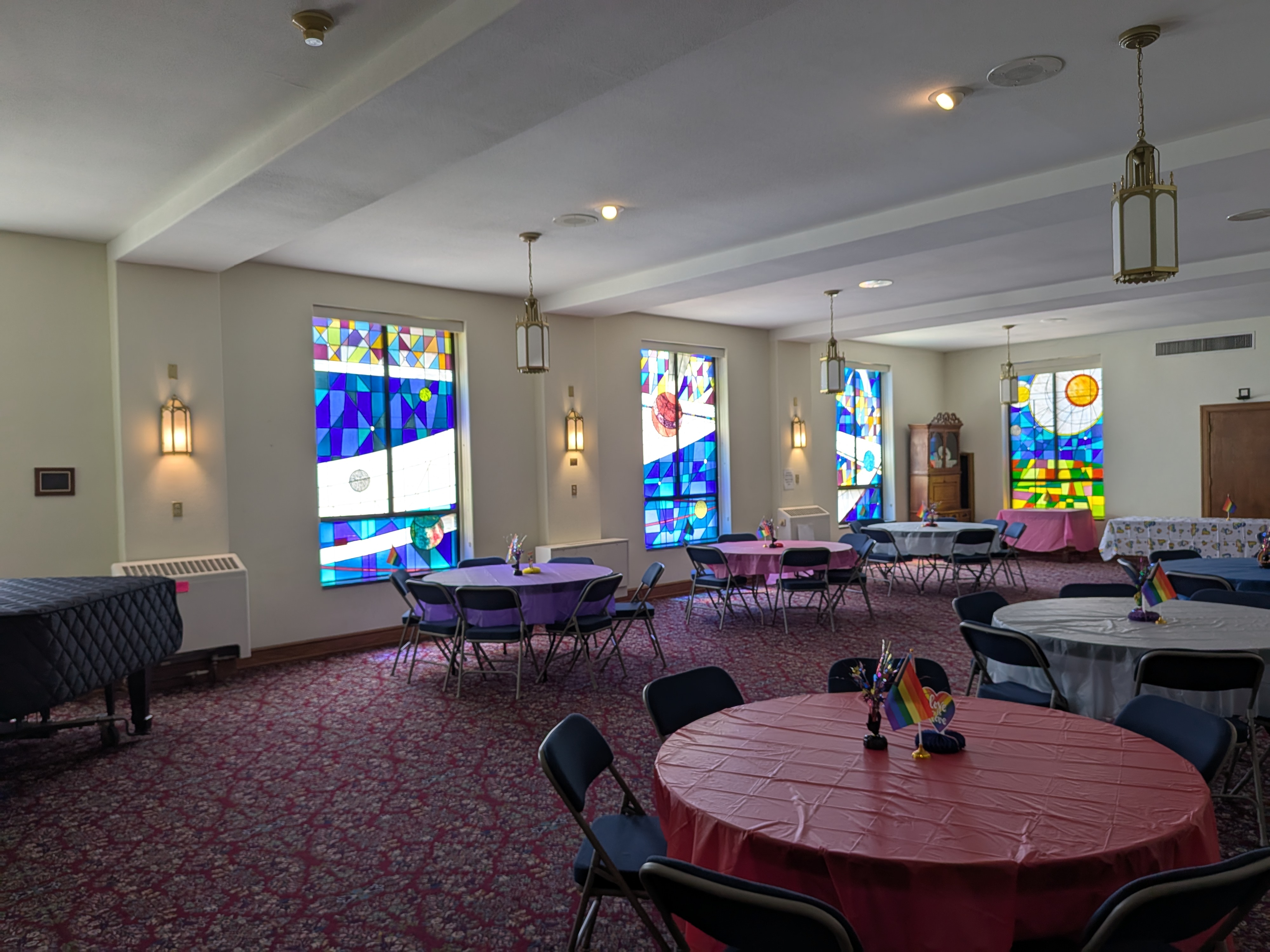
Fellowship Hall

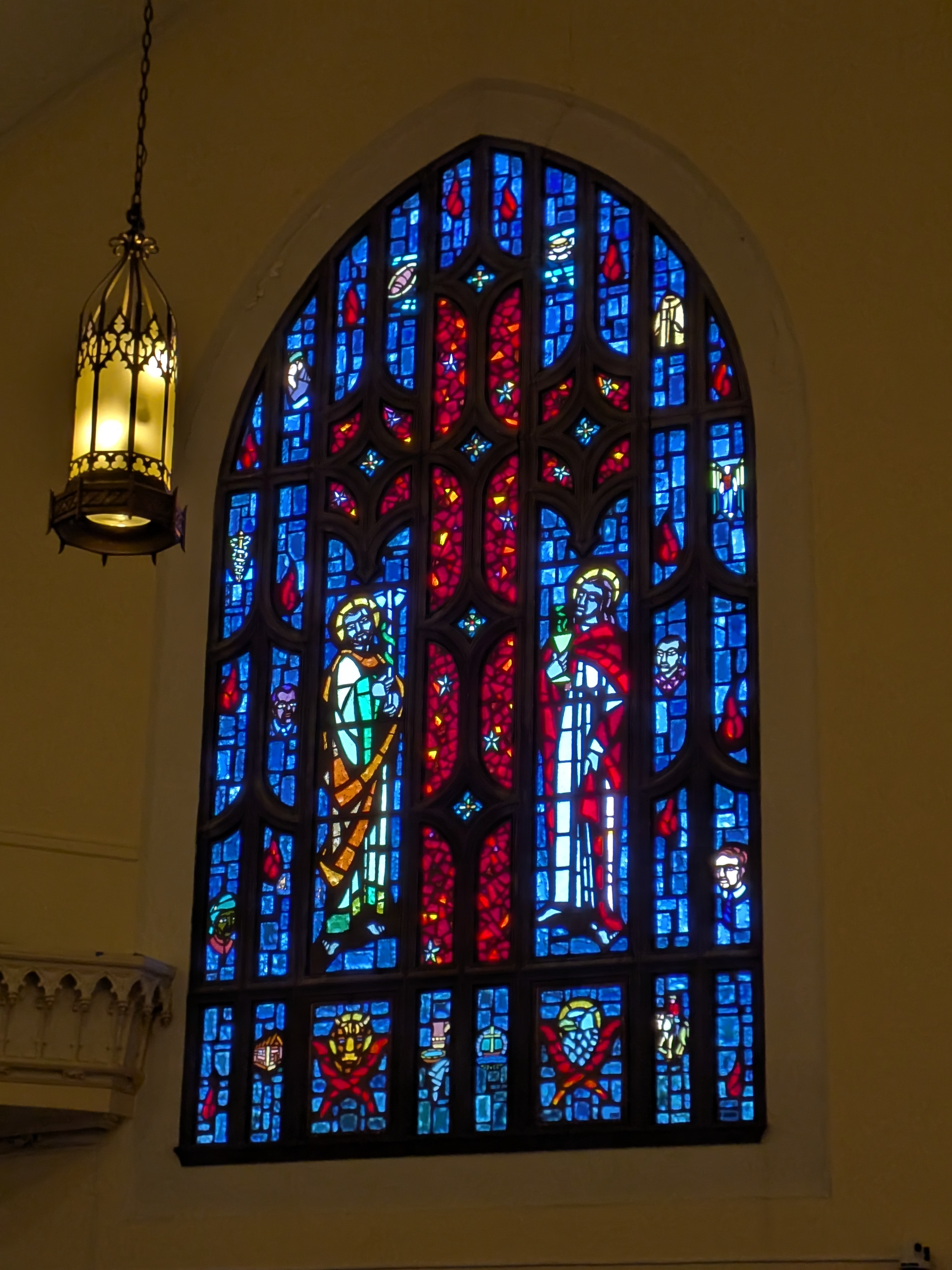
West Sanctuary Window

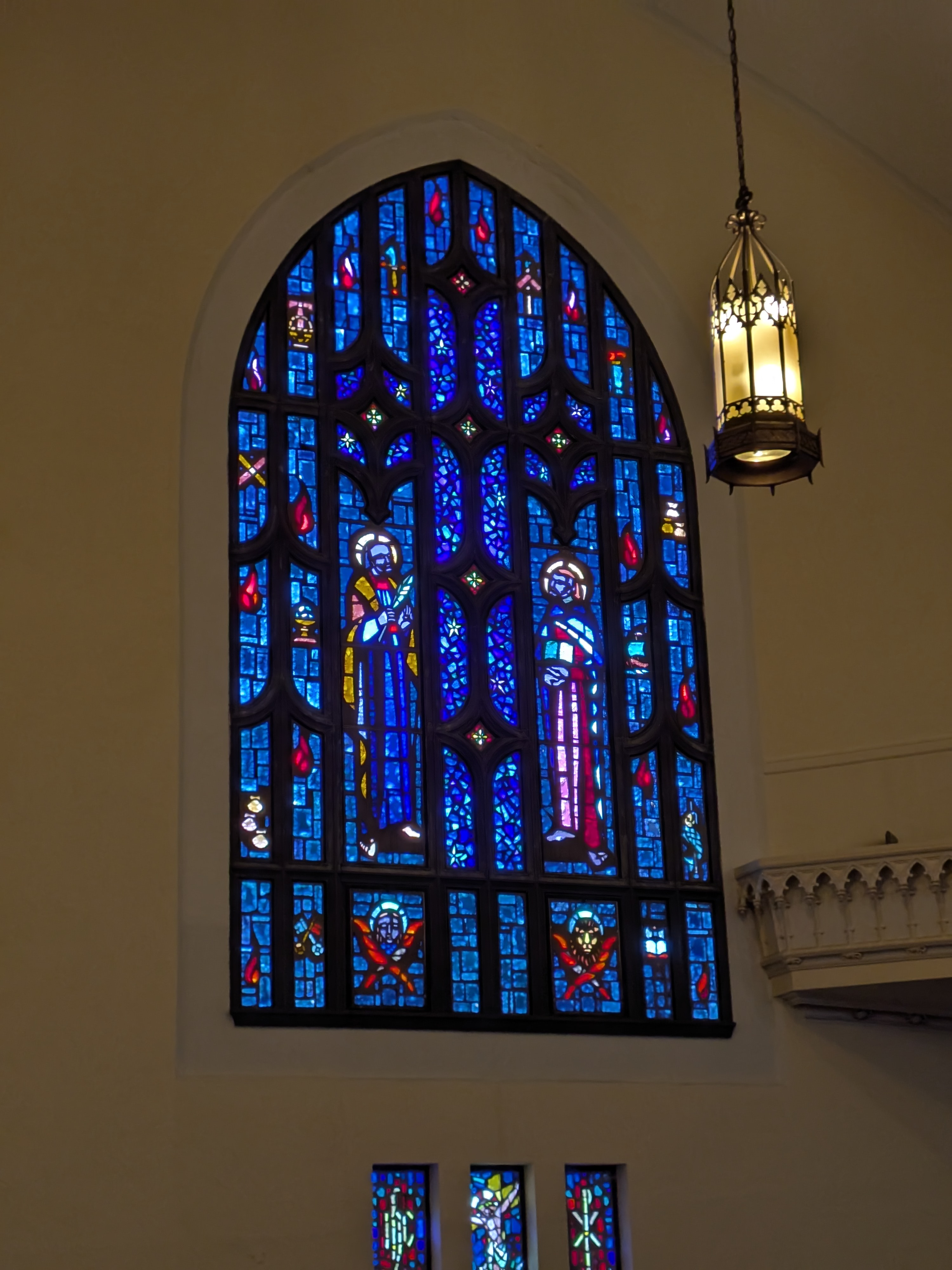
East Sanctuary Window
