= Grace Episcopal Church (St. Helena, California) =

Church in California

Coordinates: 38°30′10.5″N 122°28′10″W

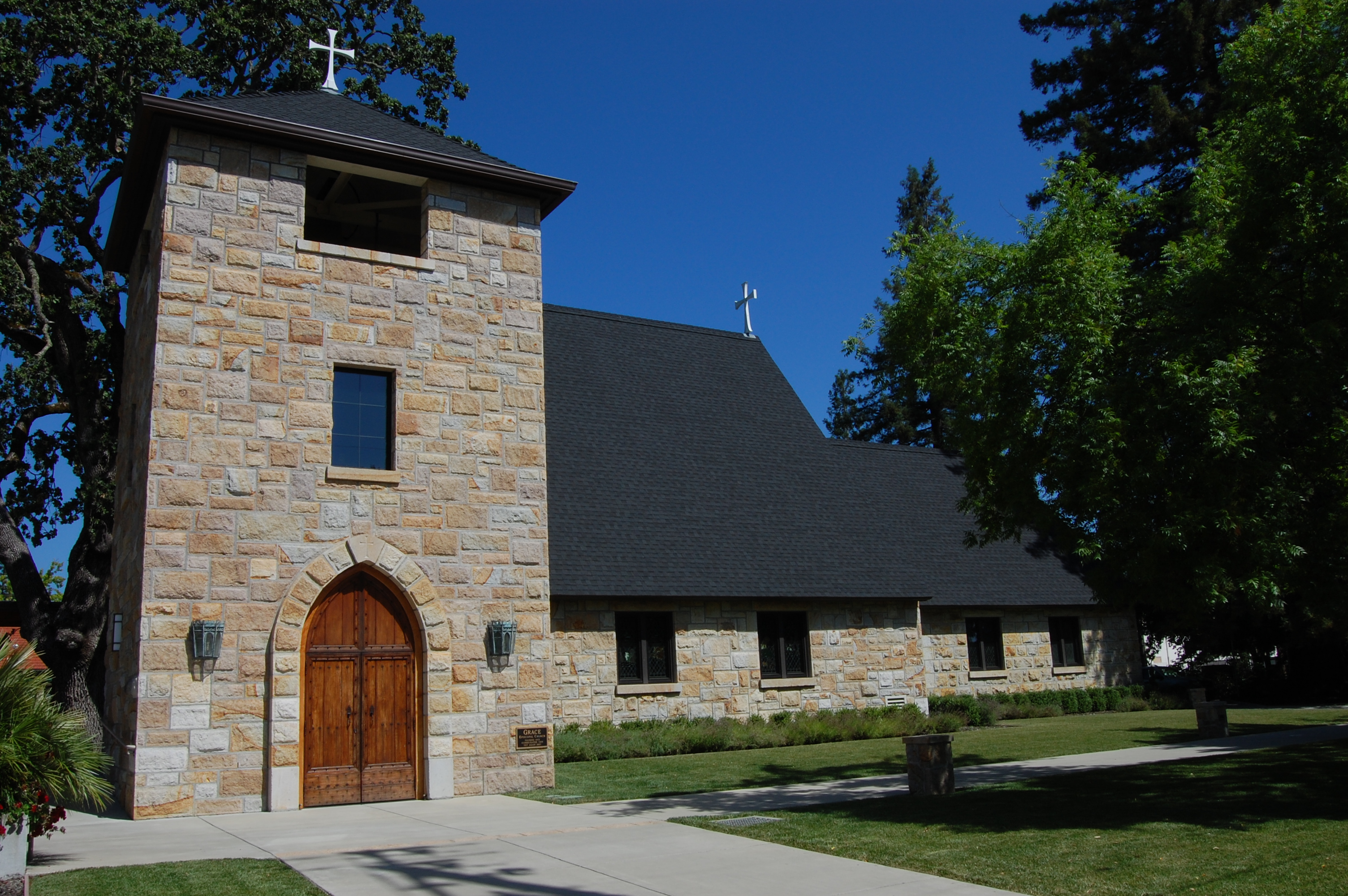
Grace Episcopal Church.

Grace Episcopal Church is an Episcopal congregation in Saint Helena, California. It is part of the Episcopal Diocese of Northern California.

== History ==
Grace Church was consecrated as an Episcopal Church on December 12, 1875. In 1882, the congregation built a small stone sanctuary on the corner of Oak and Spring Streets in Saint Helena, where the church still stands today. Grace Church became a parish in 1954, with the Rectors Rev. John Bogart, Rev. Zealand Hutton, and Rev. Richard Tumilty serving between 1958 and 1991. The arrival of the Rev. William McIlmoyl in 1993 led to a large building campaign, first of Bourn Hall, capable of hosting a fellowship event for over two hundred, along with new offices, a commercial kitchen, library, choir room, nursery, and classrooms for children and youth. The second building program, completed in 2008, was the seismic retrofit and expansion of the stone church. The newest physical addition to Grace Church is the completion of a labyrinth modeled after the one at Chartres Cathedral. It was dedicated on November 15, 2015.

In 2016 The Rev. Amy Denney Zuniga became rector of Grace Church.
