= Grace Episcopal Church (Chicago) =

Historic church in Illinois, United States

- U.S. National Historic Landmark District – Contributing property
- Chicago Landmark
- Location within Chicago metropolitan area Location within Illinois Location within the United States
- Location: Chicago, Illinois
- Coordinates: 41°52′42.48″N 87°37′41.24″W
- Architect: original: unknown; 1985-1986: Laurence Booth/Paul Hansen and Associates (Booth Hansen)
- Architectural style: Arts and Crafts architecture
- Part of: South Dearborn Street-Printing House Row North Historic District (ID76000705)

Significant dates
- Added to NRHP: January 7, 1976
- Designated CHICL: May 9, 1996

Grace Episcopal Church (founded in 1851) is the second oldest Episcopal congregation in Chicago, Illinois, United States. Since December 1985 it has occupied its 6th location, in a former printing works located at 637 South Dearborn Street in the Printer's Row neighborhood. Now also called Grace Place, the historic 3-story redbrick late 19th century Arts and Crafts building is a contributing property in the South Dearborn Street-Printing House Row North Historic District. Grace Place is also listed in the City of Chicago's Chicago Landmarks Historic Resources Survey.

== History ==
In 1851, parishioners from Chicago's oldest Episcopal congregation, then about a decade old, Trinity Episcopal Church helped found Grace Episcopal Church in the developing downtown district, which is now known as the Chicago Loop. The first building, a wooden structure, was at Dearborn and Madison Streets, and its first rector, Rev. Cornelius F. Swope, served until 1854. In 1859, the Rev. Clinton Locke became rector, and mostly served in a building at Wabash Avenue and East 8th Street and later at Wabash between 14th and 15th Street, while its parent Trinity Church moved to Jackson street between Michigan Avenue and Wabash by 1860. The Great Chicago Fire in 1871 destroyed both churches, as well as much of the city. That third Grace Church building burned down in 1915, so the congregation rebuilt the partially damaged parish house nearby, and used it for a decade. In 1929, the congregation moved to a new building at 1450 South Indiana Avenue, near St. Luke's Hospital, with which some were associated. The congregation returned to the Loop when it dedicated its fifth building, at 33 West Jackson in 1966.

It has been at its current location, in the former Printer's Row district, since 1985. Grace Episcopal Church remains an active parish in the Episcopal Diocese of Chicago. Its current rector is the Rev. Amity Carrubba.

Colonel John Mason Loomis was a devout Episcopalian and active in Chicago's Grace Episcopal Church and a big contributor.

== Architecture ==
Under the supervision of architects Laurence Booth/Paul Hansen and Associates (Booth Hansen), the building's first floor was converted into space for church social functions as well as a center for community meetings, while all of the second floor and most of the third floor were combined into worship space for the church. Booth Hansen carefully avoided the temptation to convert the building's interior into the then popular loft spaces and designed the two-story high worship space so as to minimize the intrusion of the massive wooden support posts into the raised circular sanctuary area. The remainder of the third floor was designed for offices. In 1989 Booth Hansen received the Chicago AIA chapter's 10 year award in interior architecture for Grace Place.
