= Grace Reformed Episcopal Church =

Historic Reformed Episcopal Church in Havre de Grace, Maryland, United States

Coordinates: 39°32′43″N 76°05′36″W

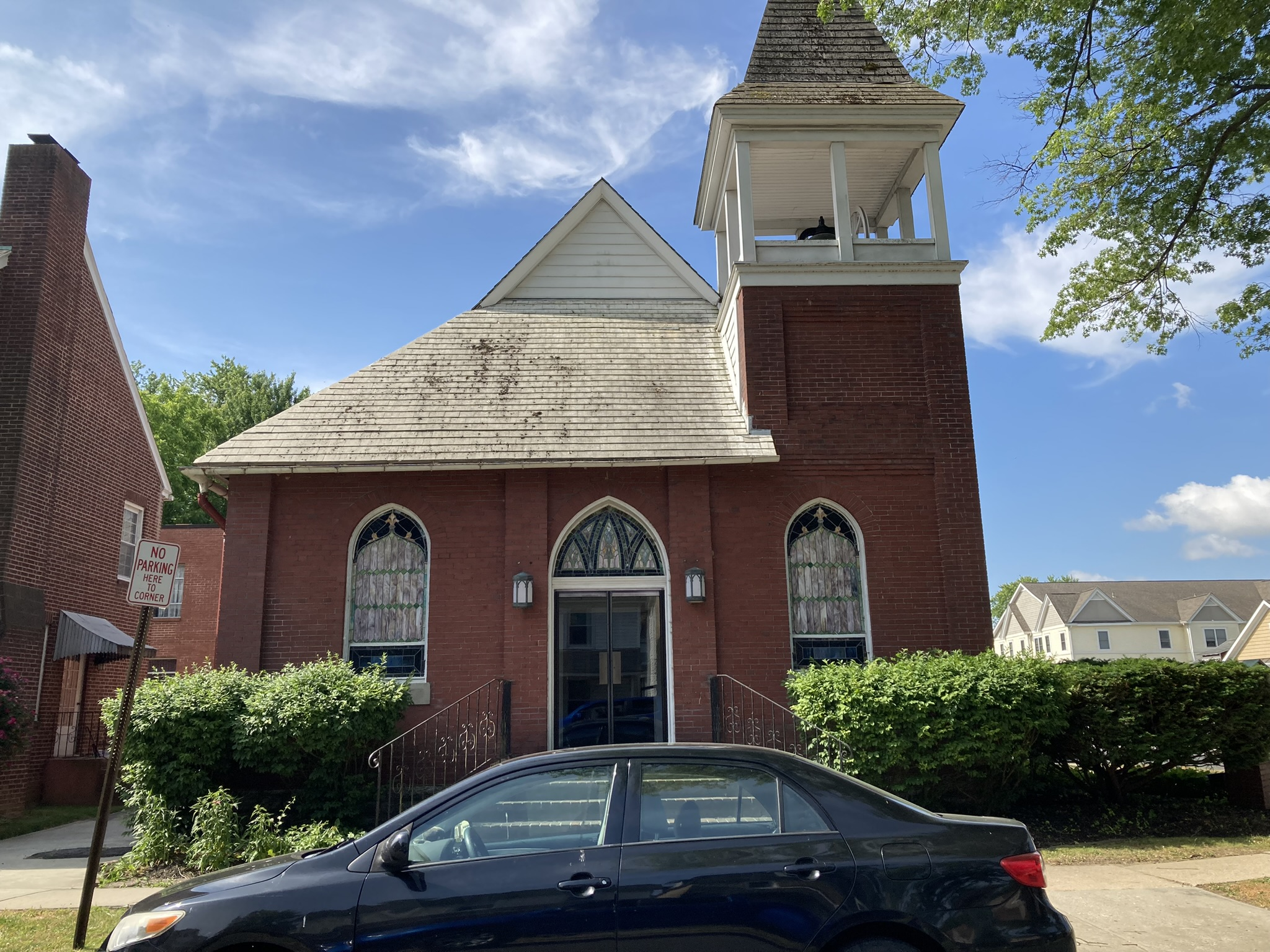
- Location: Havre de Grace, Maryland
- Country: United States
- Denomination: Anglican Church in North America; Reformed Episcopal Church
- Website: gracerechurch.org

History
- Founded: 1910
- Dedicated: 1910

Architecture
- Style: Gothic Revival

Administration
- Diocese: Northeast and Mid-Atlantic

Clergy
- Rector: The Rev. Mark Specht
- Grace Reformed Episcopal Church
- U.S. Historic district – Contributing property
- Part of: Havre de Grace Historic District (ID82002815)
- Added to NRHP: March 25, 1982

Grace Reformed Episcopal Church is a historic church in Havre de Grace, Maryland, United States. Founded and built in 1910, it is a parish of the Reformed Episcopal Church (REC)'s Diocese of the Northeast and Mid-Atlantic and a contributing property to the Havre de Grace Historic District.

== History ==
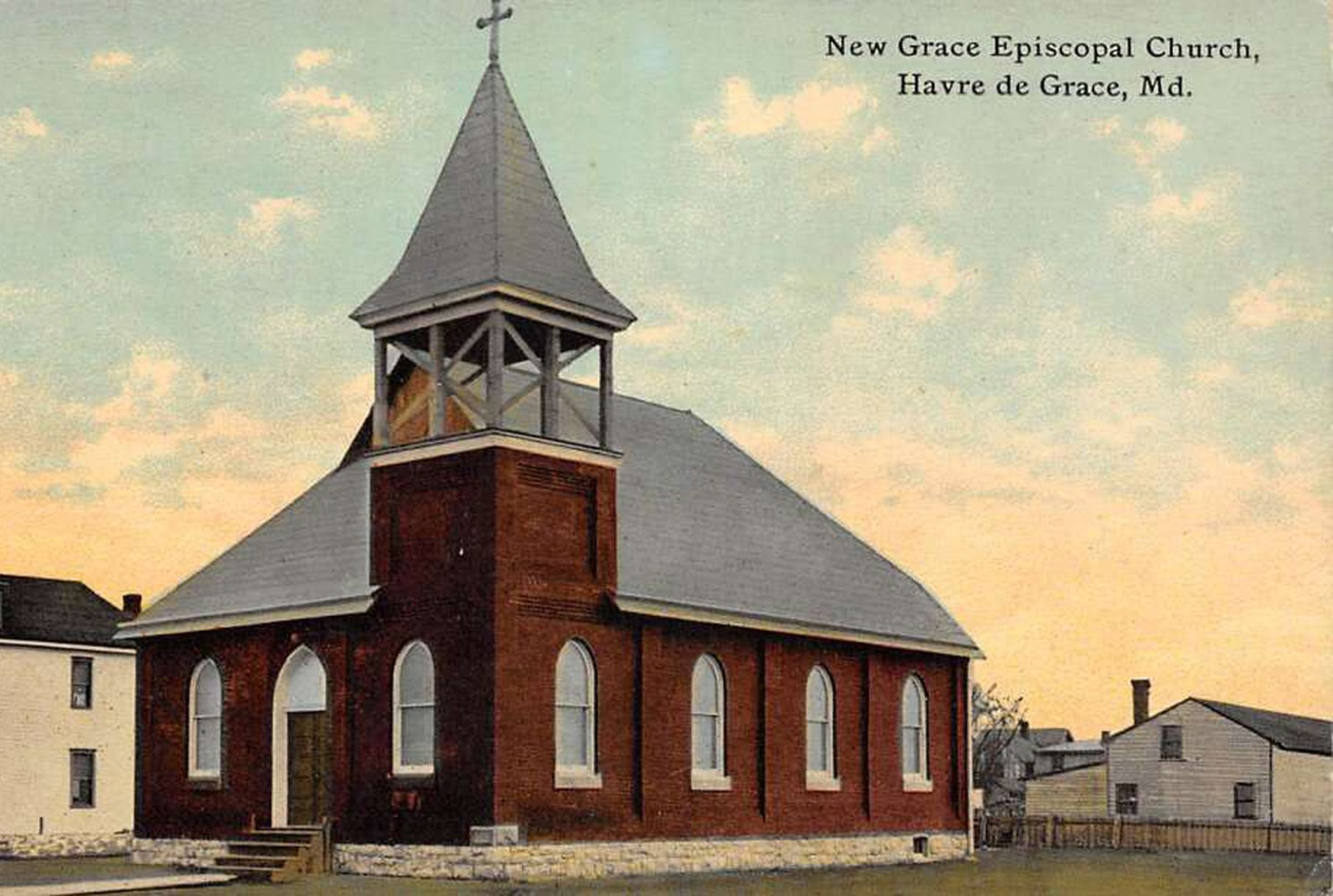
A postcard shows Grace Reformed Episcopal Church in Havre-de-Grace, Maryland, shortly after its construction in 1910.

Grace Reformed Episcopal Church was founded in 1910 as the result of a split in St. John's Episcopal Church in Havre de Grace. The church was received into the New York and Philadelphia Synod of the REC in June 1910. The cornerstone was laid that year, and the small church at 560 Fountain Street was completed in time for Christmas Day services on December 25, 1910.

The church has been expanded and renovated over its history. A 1,500-pound bell was donated in 1911., that the daughters also presented a bell weighing 1,500 lbs to Grace Reformed Episcopal Church.In 1915, a lightning strike to the steeple ignited wooden rafters and caused "considerable damage" to the church. The reconstruction deepened the chapel and added a choir and vestry room. The parish hall was built in 1916 and dedicated in 1917.

In 1950, the rectory was built next door, and in 1961, a two-story education building was added. Renovations in 1984 saw the installation of kneelers, refurbishment of the sanctuary and the addition of air conditioning. Among the church's notable members in the 20th century was G. Arnold Pfaffenbach, a Maryland state delegate in the 1930s. Pfaffenbach donated the church's pulpit in 1948 in memory of his mother.

== Architecture ==
The Maryland Historical Trust survey form for Grace REC's inclusion in the Maryland Index of Historic Properties describes a "[b]rick church, one story," with three bays by four bays. The belfry is located in the northwest corner, and the church has a hipped roof with a ridgeline running north to south. The "[w]indows have Gothic arch shape [with] Tiffany glass."

In 2010, the church received an award from the Havre de Grace Historic Preservation Commission.
