= Grace Episcopal Church (Galena, Illinois) =

Coordinates: 42.4174°N 90.4299°W

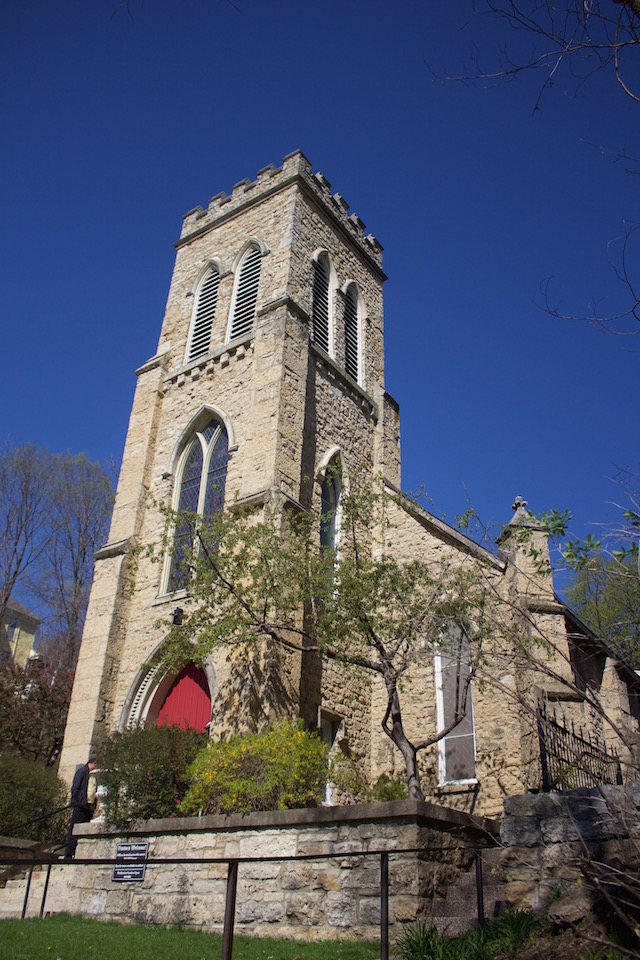
Grace Episcopal Church, 2015

Grace Episcopal Church, also known as Grace Church, is a parish church of the Episcopal Church in the Diocese of Chicago, located in Galena, Illinois. The church is the oldest continually operating Episcopal parish church in Illinois. Located at 109 South Prospect Street at Hill Street, the church sits on a hill overlooking downtown Galena.

The parish traces its history back to 1826, when Episcopal services were first held on the banks of what was then called the Fevre River (now the Galena River). Following the initial services a group of people began meeting and holding services in various houses when clergy visited the community. The parish was formally established in 1835 and was named Grace after its patron parish in Providence, Rhode Island.

Initially the parish held services at the county courthouse followed by meeting above a storefront in downtown Galena. The parish then built a wooden chapel on Bench Street in 1836. In 1838 the parish was able to purchase a Henry Erben organ which was first used in that chapel before being moved to the current church where it is still used today. By the late 1840s membership had grown to the point that more space was needed, and plans were drawn up for the current church structure. Construction began in 1847 and was constructed from limestone quarried on site. The church was completed in 1849 and consecrated in 1850. The church was fitted with windows of Belgian glass along with windows in the Tiffany style. The current altar and sacristy were added in 1893.

In 2001 and 2001 the church was completely restored at a cost of $450,000.
