= Cooper House =

Cooper House, Cooper Farmhouse, or Cooper Farm may refer to

in the United States

(by state then city)

- Davis C. Cooper House, Oxford, Alabama, listed on the National Register of Historic Places (NRHP) in Calhoun County
- Cooper House, Santa Cruz, California, 1894, former courthouse within the former Pacific Avenue Historic District, demolished after the 1989 Loma Prieta earthquake
- Cooper House (Kenton, Delaware), NRHP-listed in Kent County
- Cooper House (Duke University)
- House at 3609 Via de la Reina, Jacksonville, Florida, also known as the Cooper House, NRHP-listed
- Bartlett Cooper House, Honolulu, Hawaii, listed on the NRHP in Hawaii
- Cooper-Alley House, Waldron, Indiana, listed on the NRHP in Indiana
- George Cooper House, Maquoketa, Iowa, listed on the NRHP in Iowa
- George and Margaret Cooper House, Mount Pleasant, Iowa, listed on the NRHP in Iowa
- Cooper Hall, Sterling, Kansas, listed on the NRHP in Kansas
- Cooper House (Midway, Kentucky), listed on the NRHP in Kentucky
- Judge John E. Cooper House, West Liberty, Kentucky, listed on the NRHP in Kentucky
- Perry-Cooper House, Salisbury, Maryland, NRHP-listed
- Cooper-Frost-Austin House, Cambridge, Massachusetts, NRHP-listed
- Cooper-Davenport Tavern Wing, Somerville, Massachusetts, NRHP-listed
- Tunis R. Cooper House, Bergenfield, New Jersey, NRHP-listed
- Pearson-How, Cooper, and Lawrence Houses, Burlington, New Jersey, listed on the NRHP in New Jersey
- Joseph Cooper House, Camden, New Jersey, NRHP-listed
- General Nathan Cooper Mansion, Chester Township, New Jersey, listed on the NRHP in New Jersey
- Benjamin Cooper Farm, Moorestown, New Jersey, listed on the NRHP in New Jersey
- Thunise & Richard Cooper House, Oradell, New Jersey, NRHP-listed
- Evans–Cooper House, Pine Grove, New Jersey, listed on the NRHP in New Jersey
- MacGregor-Tallman House, West Long Branch, New Jersey, also known as Cooper House, listed on the NRHP in Monmouth County, New Jersey
- A. S. Cooper Farm, Brownwood, North Carolina, listed on the NRHP in North Carolina
- Robert Lafayette Cooper House, Murphey, North Carolina, NRHP-listed
- Katherine Cooper House, Dover, Ohio, listed on the NRHP in Ohio
- Samuel Cooper Farmhouse, Radnor, Ohio, listed on the NRHP in Ohio
- James S. and Jennie M. Cooper House, Independence, Oregon, listed on the NRHP in Oregon
- Isaac Cooper House, Limestone, Tennessee, listed on the NRHP in Tennessee
- Gov. Prentice Cooper House, Shelbyville, Tennessee, listed on the NRHP in Tennessee
- Jesse and Sara Cooper House, Georgetown, Texas, listed on the NRHP in Texas
- Taylor-Cooper House, Georgetown, Texas, listed on the NRHP in Williamson County, Texas
- Madison Cooper House, Waco, Texas, listed on the NRHP in Texas
- Henry Cooper House, Parkersburg, West Virginia, NRHP-listed
- Cooper-Gillies House, Evansville, Wisconsin, listed on the NRHP in Wisconsin
- Cooper Mansion (Laramie, Wyoming), Laramie, Wyoming, listed on the NRHP in Albany County, Wyoming

== See also ==
- Cooper Hall, Rice County, Kansas
- Cooper Union, New York City
