= Henry Martyn Congdon =

American architect and designer

Henry Martyn Congdon FAIA
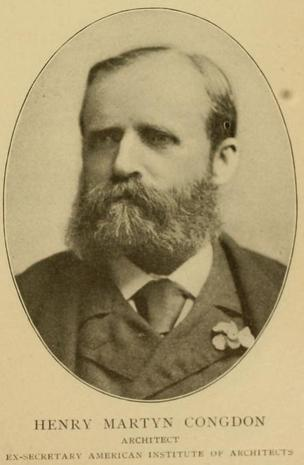
- Born: May 10, 1834; Brooklyn
- Died: February 28, 1922 (aged 87); Brooklyn
- Education: Columbia College
- Occupation: Architect
- Years active: 1854–1922
- Awards: Fellow of the American Institute of Architects (1867)
- Buildings: St. Andrew's Episcopal Church, Harlem; St. Michael's Episcopal Cathedral, Boise

Henry Martyn Congdon FAIA (May 10, 1834 – February 28, 1922) was an American architect and designer. The son of an Episcopal priest who was a founder of the New York Ecclesiological Society, he was born in Brooklyn, New York. In 1854, he graduated from Columbia College, where he was a member of Psi Upsilon.

Congdon was apprenticed to John W. Priest, and following Priest's death, assumed his practice, located at the time in Newburgh, New York. He moved the practice to Manhattan, cooperating for a time with Emlen T. Littell and J. Cleveland Cady. Together with Cady he designed the Brooklyn Academy of Design in the High Victorian Gothic mode. Congdon later practiced alone, until he was joined by his son, Herbert Wheaton Congdon. He resided in Brooklyn at the time of his death.

Specializing in churches, he designed numerous Episcopal churches during his career, mainly in the Gothic Revival tradition.

During the Civil War, he served as a member of the 7th Regiment. During his career, he was Vice President of the Brooklyn Academy of Arts and Sciences, and Secretary of the American Institute of Architects.

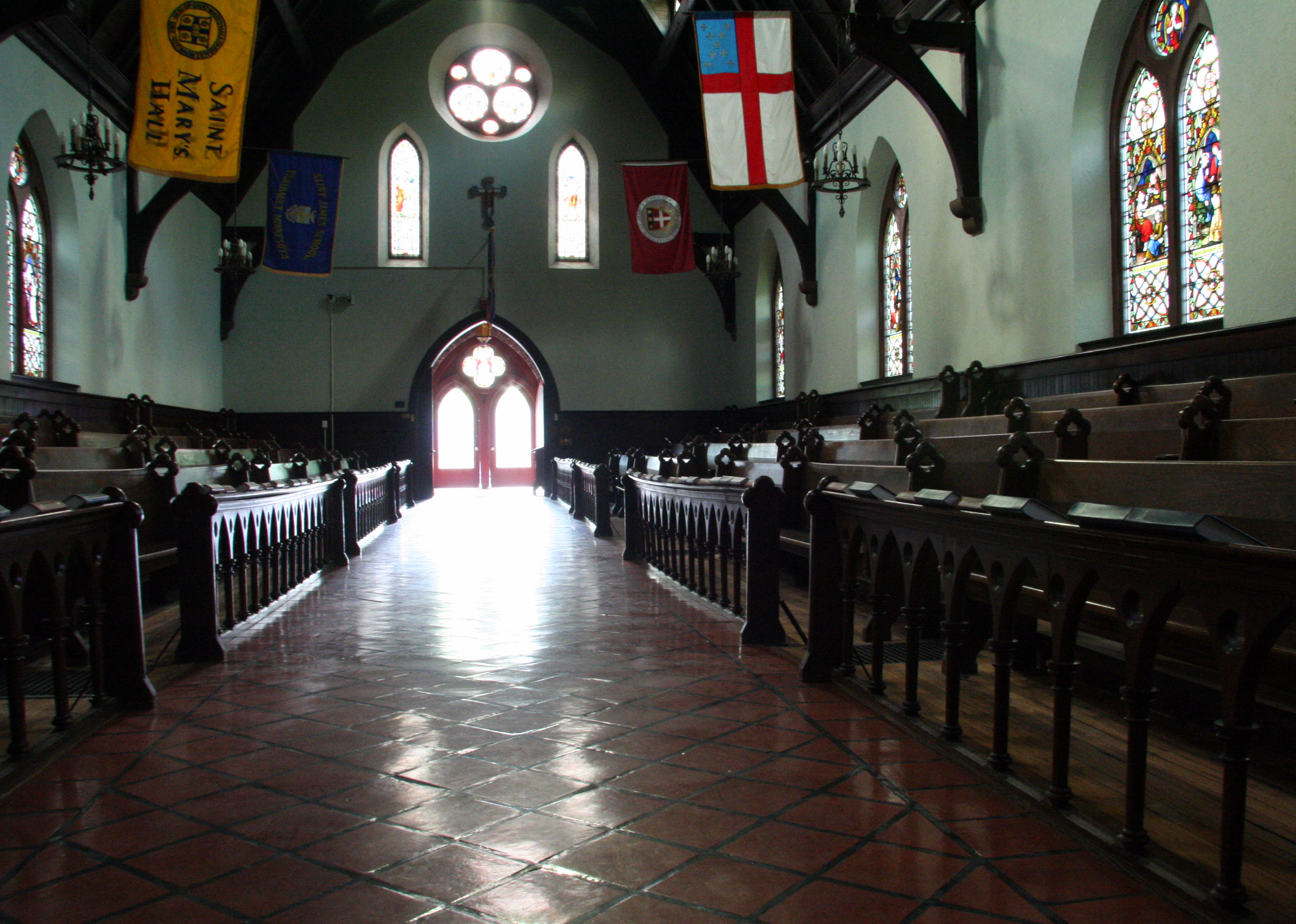
Chapel of the Good Shepherd (1872), Shattuck-Saint Mary's School, Faribault, Minnesota

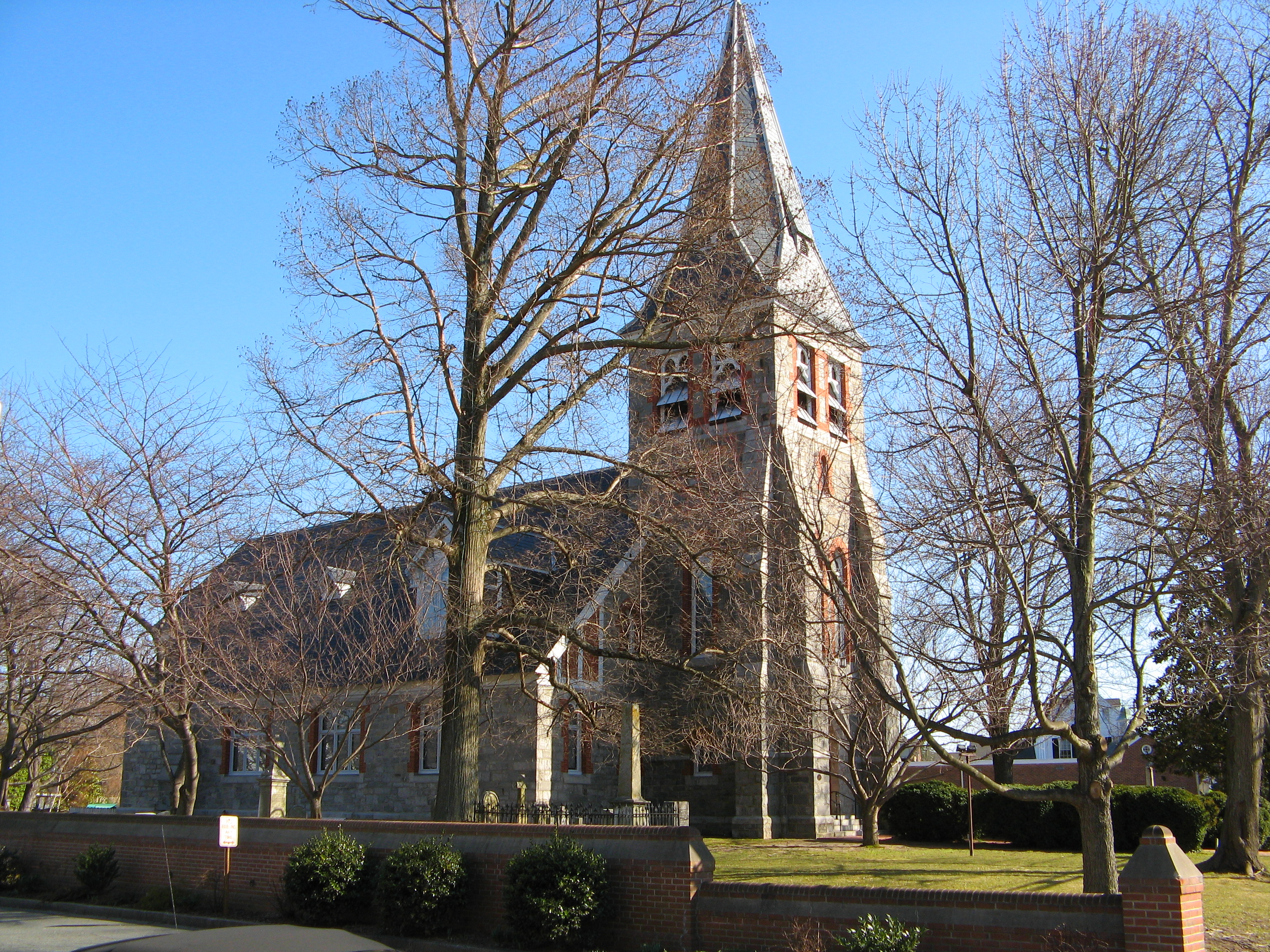
Christ Episcopal Church (1878), St. Michaels, Maryland

== Works ==
His church designs include:

- Episcopal Church of the Holy Communion, St. Peter, Minnesota, 1869.
- Trinity Episcopal Church, Litchfield, Minnesota, 1871.
- St. Thomas' Episcopal Church (now Union Baptist), Hartford, Connecticut, 1871.
- Episcopal Church of the Good Shepherd (now Islamic Awareness Center), Binghamton, New York, 1871
- St. Andrew's Episcopal Church, Manhattan, New York, 1872.
- Calvary Episcopal Church, Utica, New York, 1872.
- Chapel of the Good Shepherd, Shattuck-Saint Mary's School, Faribault, Minnesota, 1872.
- Grace Episcopal Church, Paducah, Kentucky, 1873.
- Trinity Episcopal Church, Lime Rock, Connecticut, 1874.
- Christ Episcopal Church, St. Michaels, Maryland, 1878.
- St. Luke's Episcopal Church, Lebanon, Pennsylvania, 1880.
- St. John's Episcopal Church, Dubuque, Iowa, 1878.
- Christ Episcopal Church, Portsmouth, New Hampshire, 1883, burned 1963.
- St. Mark's Episcopal Church, Cheyenne, Wyoming, 1886.
- St. James Episcopal Church, Cambridge, Massachusetts, 1888.
- Christ Episcopal Church, Westerly, Rhode Island, 1894.
- St. Mark's Episcopal Church (Lewistown, PA), 1894.
- Christ Episcopal Church, Ansonia, Connecticut, 1896.
- Calvary Episcopal Church, Summit, New Jersey, 1896
- Church of the Ascension, (Mount Vernon, New York)), 1896.
- Trinity Episcopal Church, Torrington, Connecticut, 1898.
- Trinity Episcopal Church, Carbondale, Pennsylvania, 1899.
- St. Michael's Episcopal Cathedral, Boise, Idaho, 1900.
- All Saints' Episcopal Church, Easton, Maryland, 1900.
- St. John's Episcopal Church, Boulder, Colorado, 1903.
- Christ Episcopal Church New Brighton, Staten Island, New York, 1904.
- St. Paul's Episcopal Church, Philipsburg, Pennsylvania, 1911.

He also designed a number of baptismal fonts and similar appurtenances for other churches.

== Gallery ==
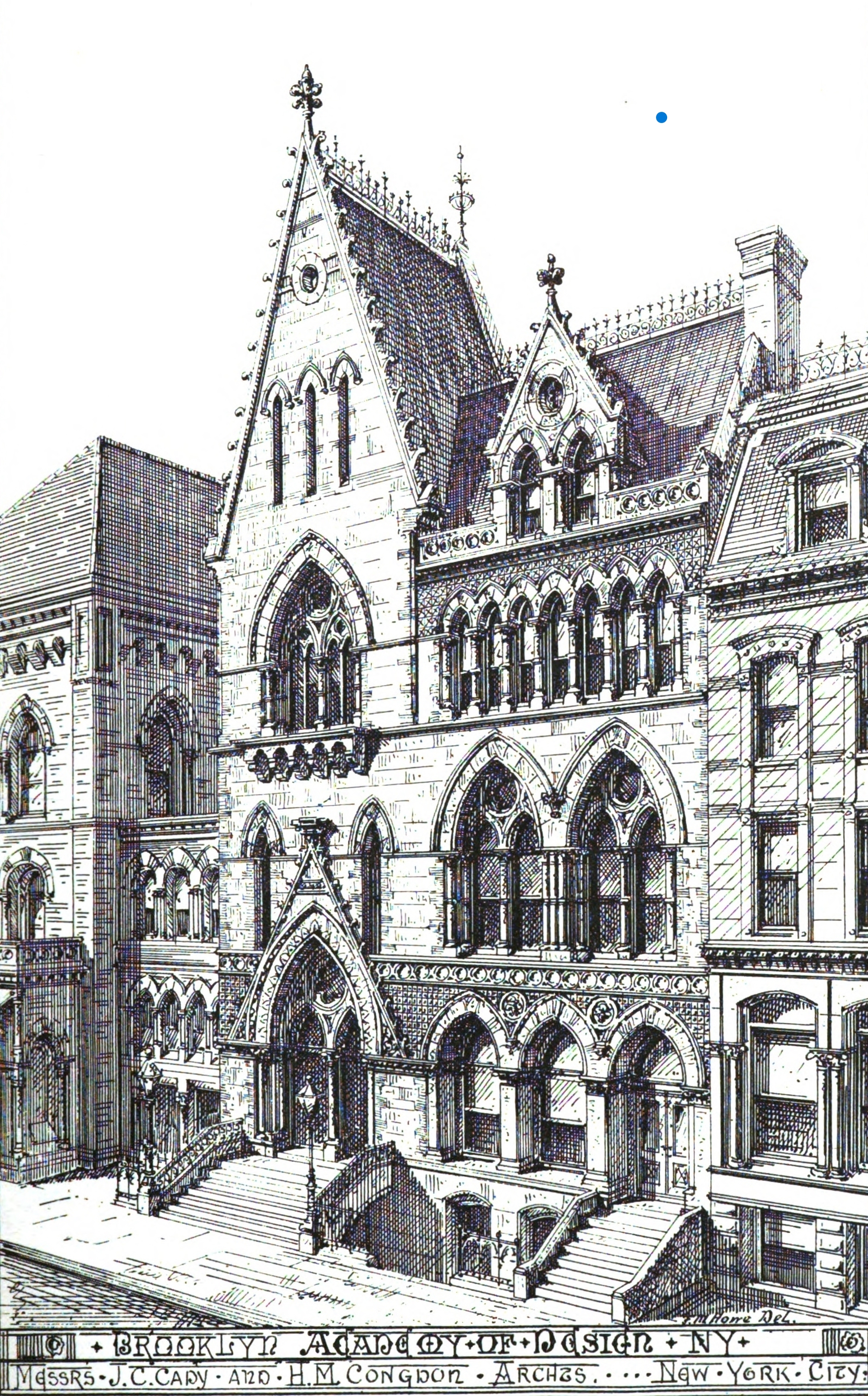
Brooklyn Academy of Design

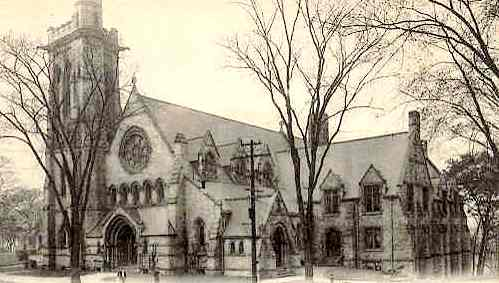
Christ Episcopal Church (1896), Ansonia, Connecticut

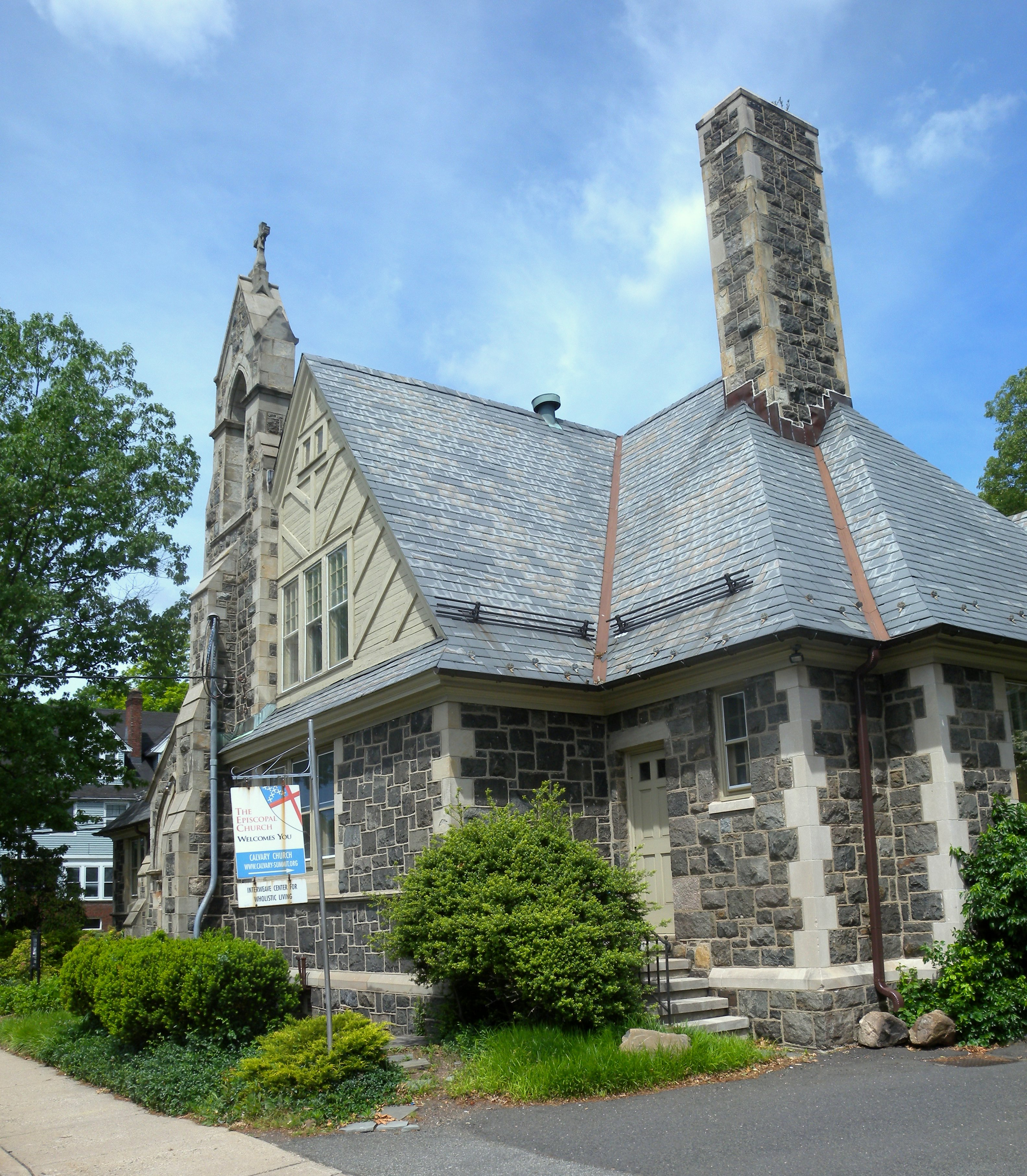
Calvary Episcopal Church (1896), Summit, New Jersey.

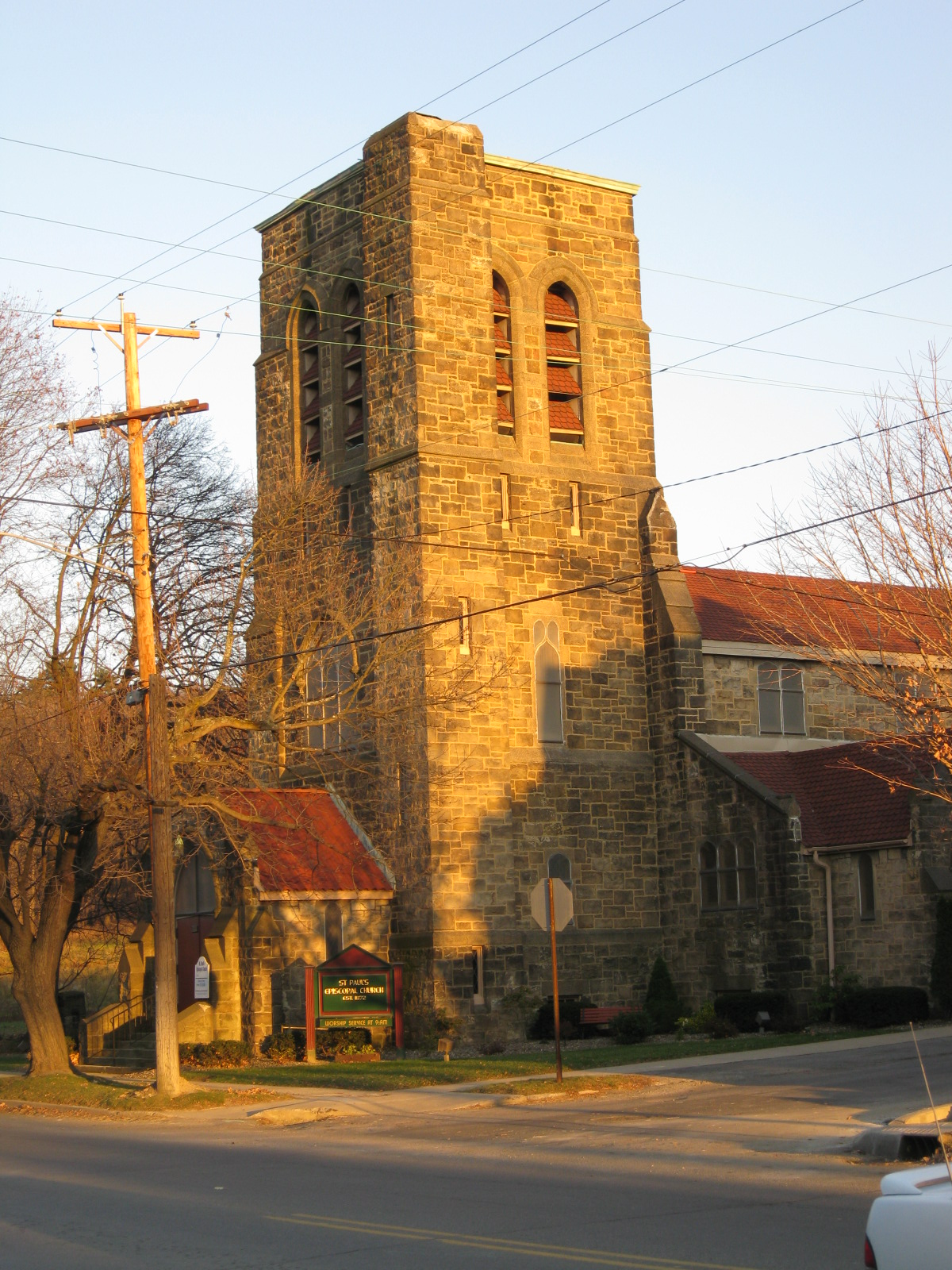
St. Paul's Episcopal Church (1911), Philipsburg, Pennsylvania.

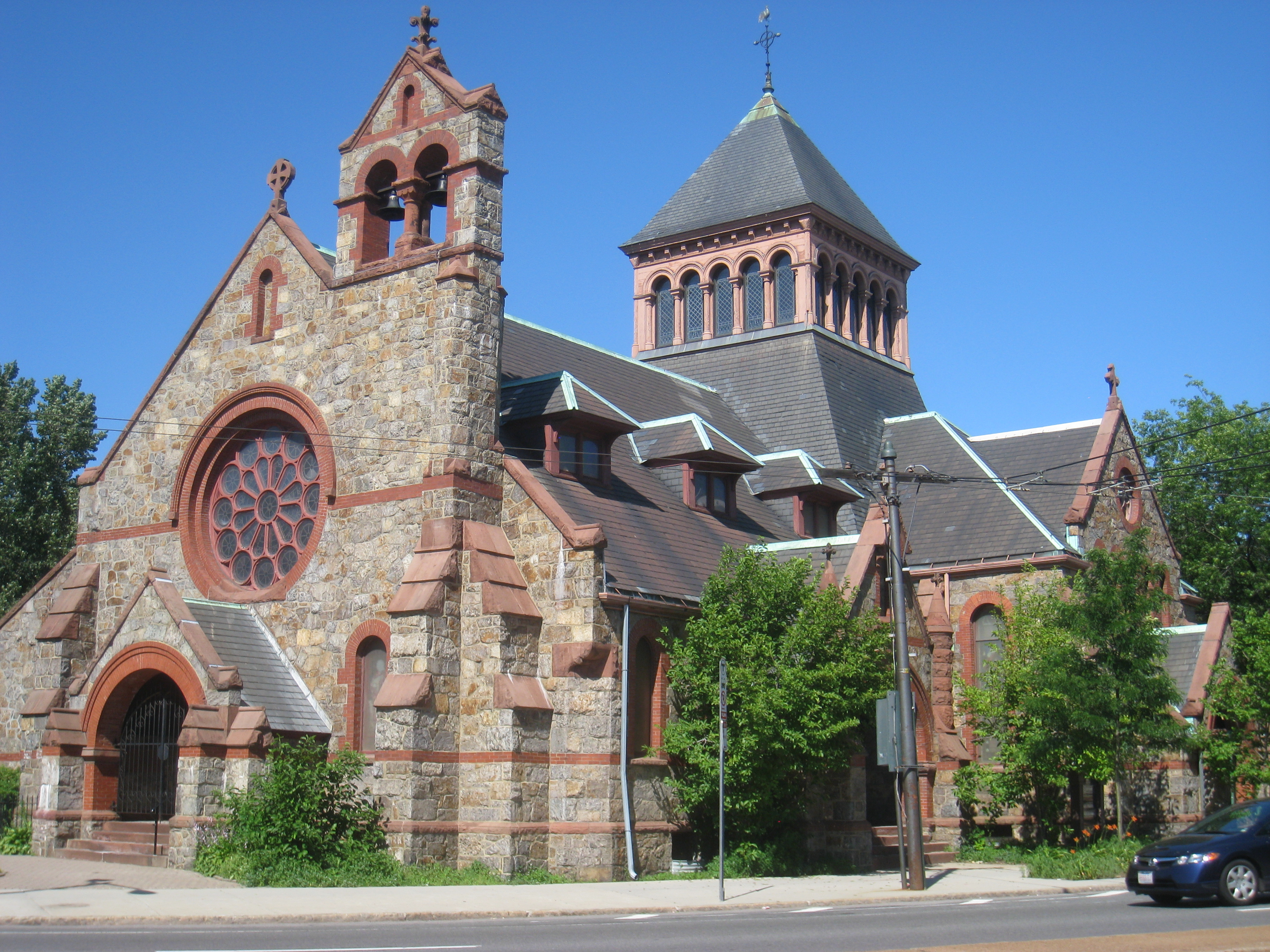
St. James Episcopal Church, Cambridge, Massachusetts.
