= Coopers' Hall =

Coopers Hall may refer to:

- Coopers' Hall, London, England, the home of the Worshipful Company of Coopers
- Coopers' Hall, part of the Bristol Old Vic theatre, England
- Coopers Hall Winery and Taproom, Portland, Oregon, U.S.

== See also ==
- Cooper Hall
