= Church of the Holy Communion (St. Peter, Minnesota) =

Historic church in Minnesota, United States

- U.S. National Register of Historic Places
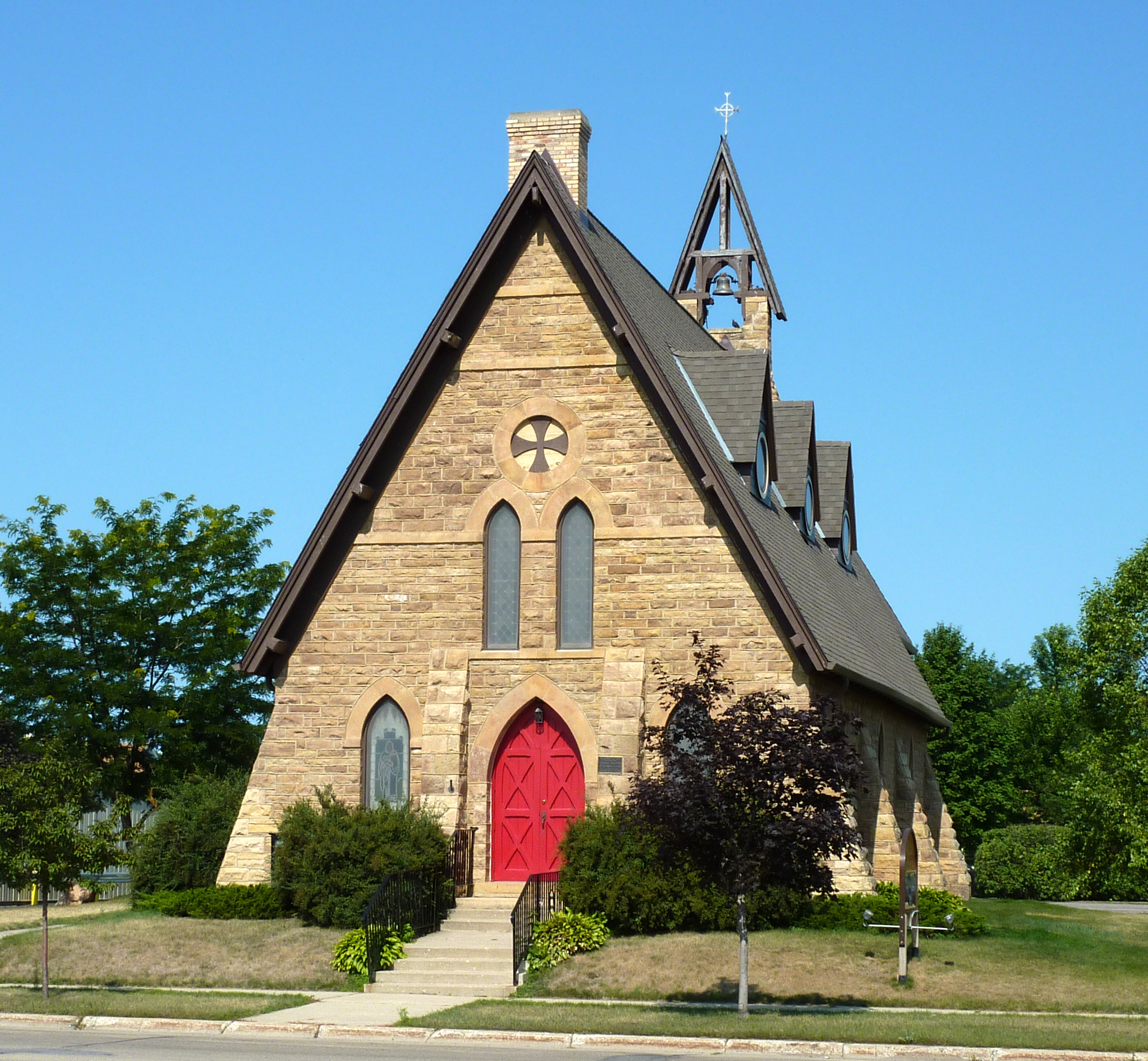
- Church of the Holy Communion from the east

- Location within Minnesota Location within the United States
- Location: 116 N. Minnesota Ave., St. Peter, Minnesota
- Coordinates: 44°19′36″N 93°57′19″W
- Area: less than one acre
- Built: 1869
- Architect: Henry Martyn Congdon
- Architectural style: Late Gothic Revival
- NRHP reference No.: 83000914
- Added to NRHP: May 19, 1983

The Church of the Holy Communion is an historic stone Episcopal church building located at 116 North Minnesota Avenue St. Peter, Minnesota, United States. It is a congregation of the Episcopal Diocese of Minnesota. The church's priest in charge is the Rev. Chris Boehm Carlson.

The church reported 108 members in 2015 and 39 members in 2023; no membership statistics were reported in 2024 parochial reports. Plate and pledge income reported for the congregation in 2024 was $69,855 with average Sunday attendance (ASA) of 22 persons. This relatively steady from ASA of 25 reported in 2015.

== History and building ==
The first Episcopal Church service in St. Peter was held on October 27, 1854, at the home of St. Peter's founder Captain William Bigelow Dodd and his wife Harriet. Bishop Jackson Kemper officiated at the service which was attended by 37 people. Mrs. Dodd was instrumental in inviting Bishop Kemper to St. Peter. A parish was soon established and the first church a wood-frame structure was built in 1855 near where the current stone church stands. The Rev. Ezra Jones was the first rector of the congregation, he was succeeded by the Rev. Edward Livermore who was rector at the time the current church was constructed. The bell from the first church was placed in the tower of the new church and has rung on the death of every American president since Abraham Lincoln. The bodies of Captain Dodd, his wife Harriet, and two of their children—Willis Gorman Dodd and Harriet Virginia Dodd—lie buried in a grave behind the present church.

Designed by noted ecclesiastical architect Henry Martyn Congdon of New York City in the Gothic Revival style of architecture, it was built in 1869 of Kasota limestone. It features buttresses and a steeply sloping gabled roof with smaller gabled eye-windows on each slope of the roof. On May 19, 1983, the building was added to the National Register of Historic Places.
