= All Saints' Church (Easton, Maryland) =

Historic church in Maryland, United States

- U.S. National Register of Historic Places
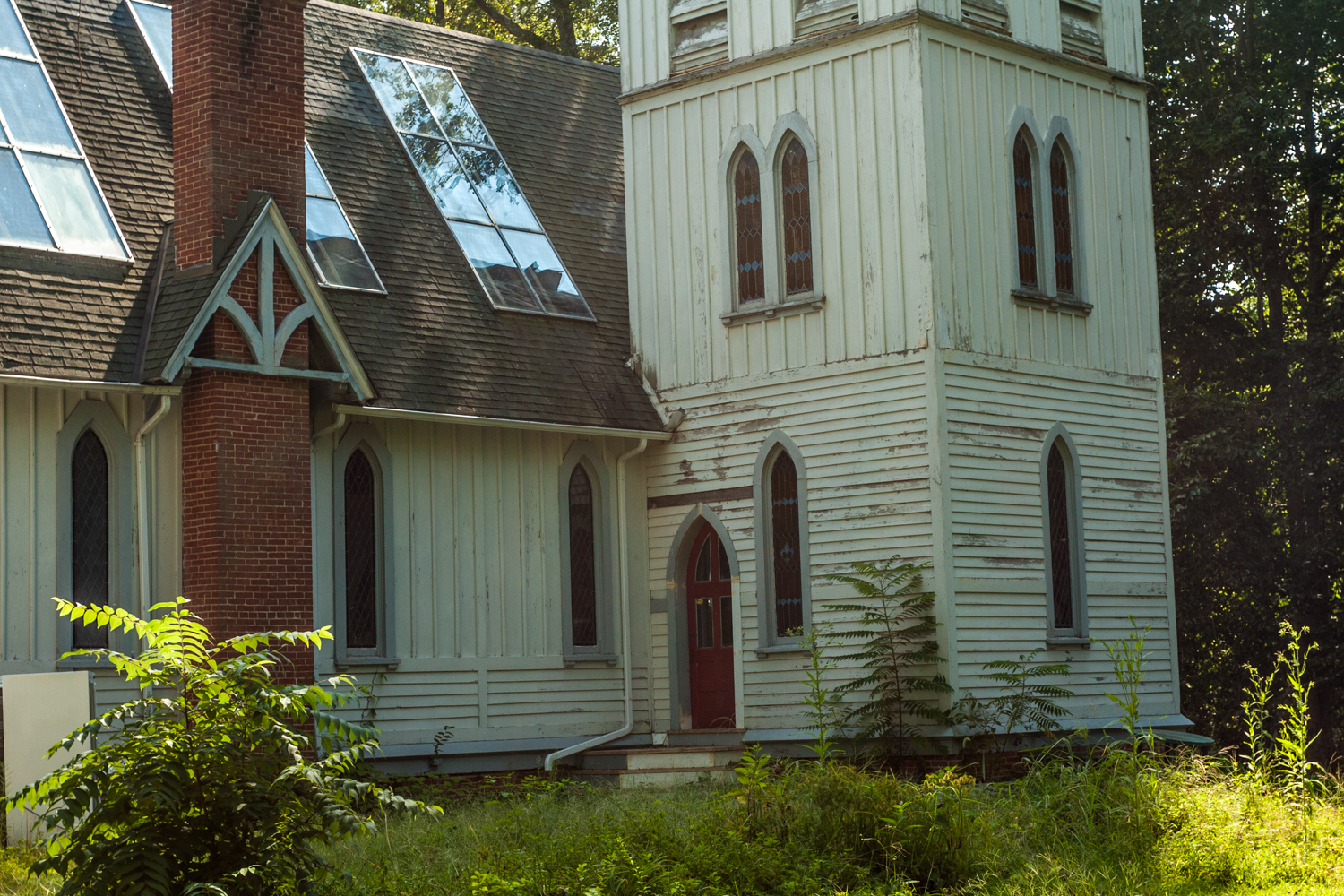

- Location within Maryland Location within the United States
- Location: 10806 Longwoods Road (MD 662), Easton, Maryland
- Coordinates: 38°50′46″N 76°4′53″W
- Area: 3.8 acres (1.5 ha)
- Built: 1900
- Architectural style: Gothic, Queen Anne
- NRHP reference No.: 83002962
- Added to NRHP: May 27, 1983

All Saints' Church is a historic Carpenter Gothic style Episcopal church at Easton, Talbot County, Maryland, United States. It is a small rectangular frame church constructed in 1900–1901. The exterior features of the church include a three-stage bell tower with a shingled spire. The interior features imported stained glass windows from Munich, Germany, along with decorative tile floors, a darkly stained exposed timber roof structure, and intricately carved church furniture. The church was designed by New York architect, Henry Martyn Congdon.

All Saints' Church was listed on the National Register of Historic Places in 1983.
