= St. Andrew's Episcopal Church (New York City) =

Church in Manhattan, New York

- U.S. National Register of Historic Places
- New York State Register of Historic Places
- New York City Landmark
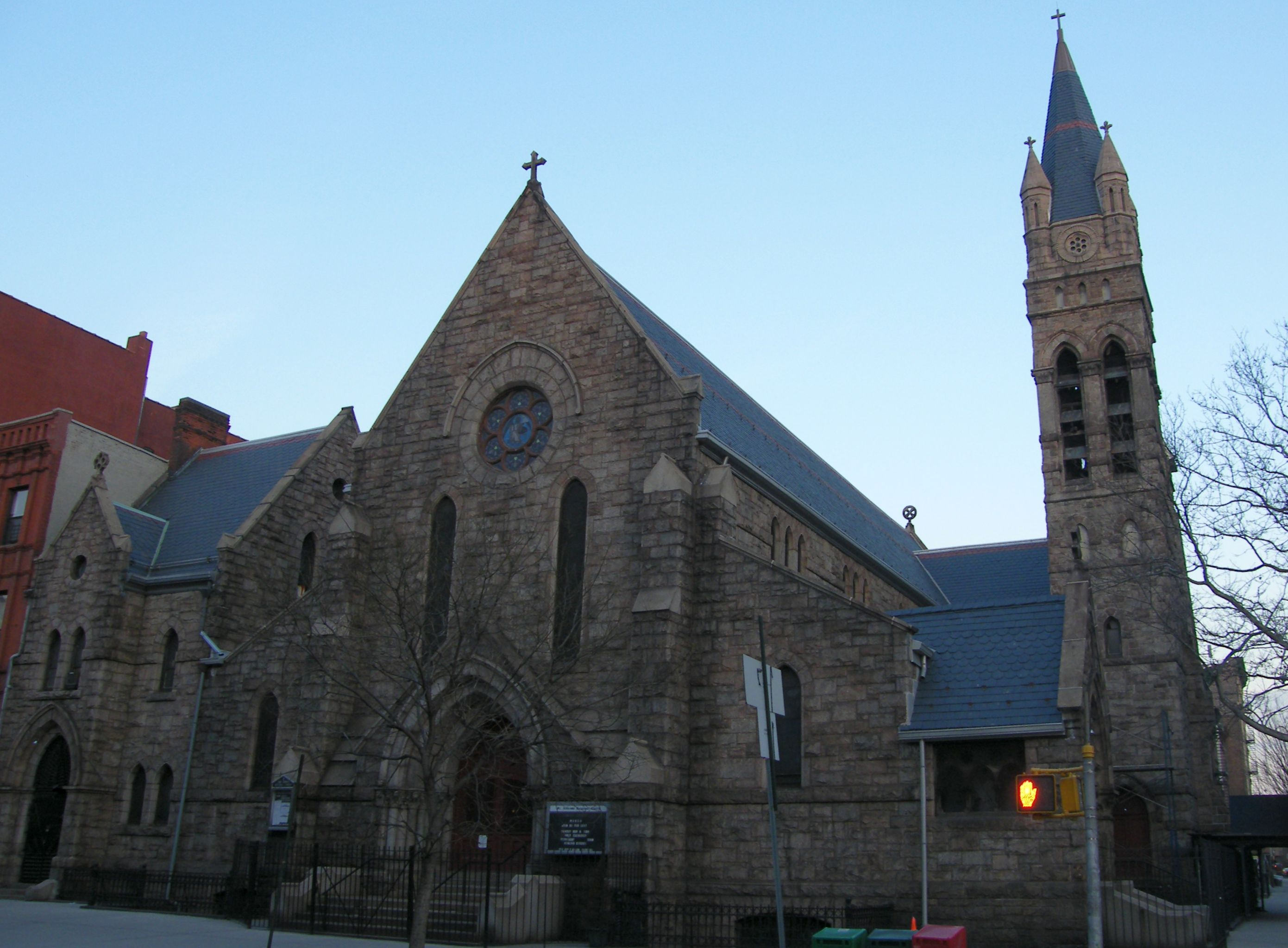
- St. Andrews Episcopal Church, March 2009

- Location within New York City Location within New York Location within the United States
- Location: 2067 5th Ave. New York City, New York
- Coordinates: 40°48′28″N 73°56′33″W
- Built: 1872
- Architect: Henry M. Congdon
- Architectural style: Gothic
- NRHP reference No.: 80002717
- NYSRHP No.: 06101.000427
- NYCL No.: 0294

Significant dates
- Added to NRHP: March 18, 1980
- Designated NYSRHP: June 23, 1980
- Designated NYCL: April 12, 1967

St. Andrew's Episcopal Church is a historic Episcopal church located at 2067 Fifth Avenue at 127th Street in the neighborhood of Harlem in Manhattan, New York City. Built in 1872, it was designed by noted New York City architect Henry M. Congdon (1834–1922) in the Gothic Revival style. It features a 125 foot tall clock tower surmounted by a slate covered spire surrounded by four towerlets.

On March 18, 1980, it was added to the National Register of Historic Places. The church was designated as a city landmark by the New York City Landmarks Preservation Commission in 1967. It is still an active parish in the Episcopal Diocese of New York.

The church reported 144 members in 2019 and 130 members in 2023; no membership statistics were reported in 2024 parochial reports. Plate and pledge income reported for the congregation in 2024 was $214,414 with average Sunday attendance (ASA) of 48 persons.

== See also ==
- List of New York City Designated Landmarks in Manhattan above 110th Street
- National Register of Historic Places listings in Manhattan above 110th Street
- George Roe Van De Water, prominent rector
