= Grace Episcopal Church (Paducah, Kentucky) =

Historic church in Kentucky, United States

- U.S. National Register of Historic Places
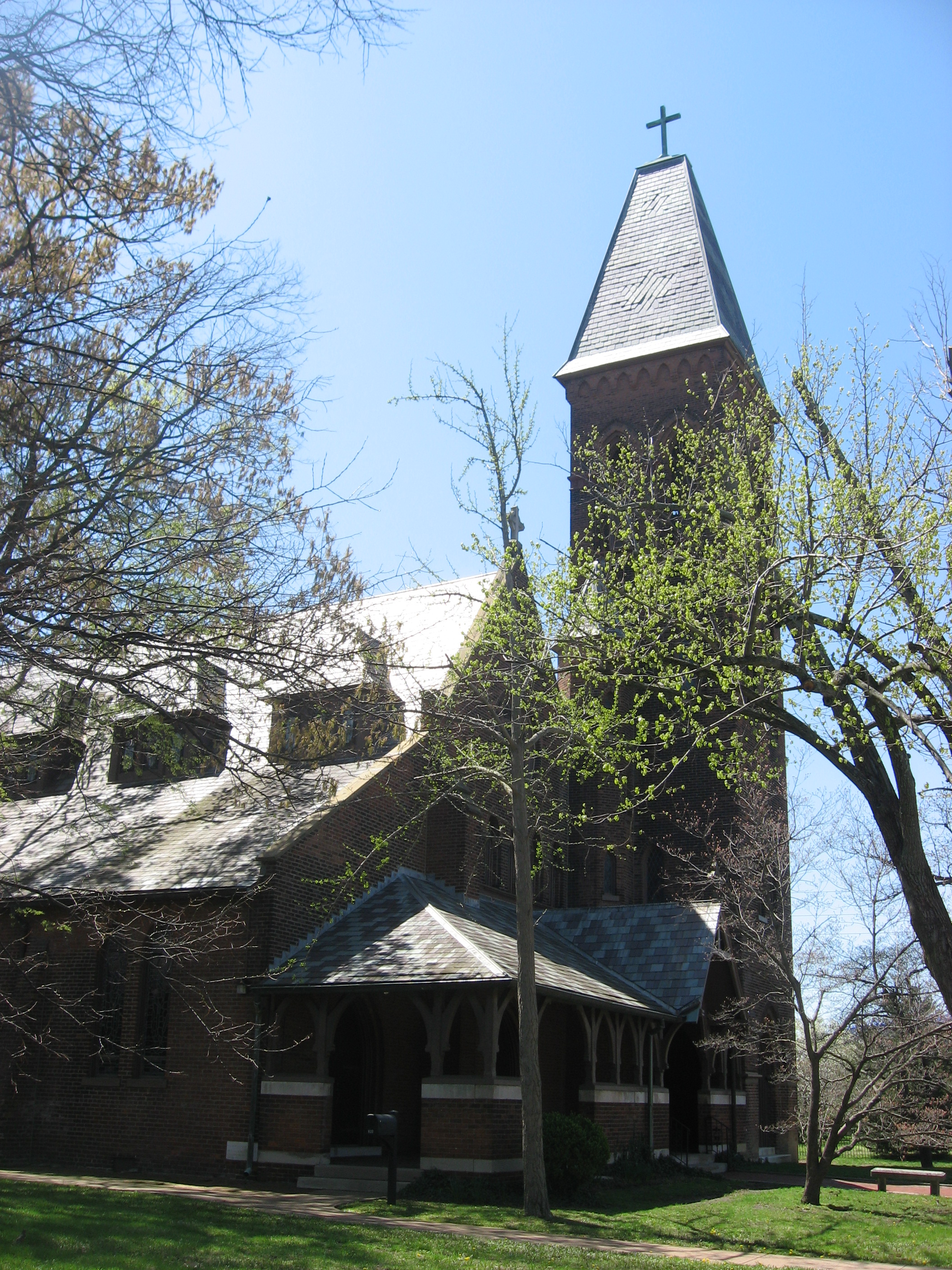
- Front and eastern side

- Location within Kentucky Location within the United States
- Location: 820 Broadway, Paducah, Kentucky
- Coordinates: 37°5′3″N 88°36′13″W
- Area: 2 acres (0.81 ha)
- Built: 1873
- Architect: Congdon, Henry M.
- Architectural style: Gothic, Romanesque
- NRHP reference No.: 76002148
- Added to NRHP: March 16, 1976

Grace Episcopal Church is a historic church in Paducah, Kentucky.

The church is located at 820 Broadway in the historic centre of Paducah, close to the Lloyd Tilghman House and Civil War Museum.

A church has been on the site since 1846. The current building dates from 1873, the design of architect Henry Martyn Congdon, and was added to the National Register of Historic Buildings in 1976.

The church continues as an active centre of worship in the Diocese of Kentucky.
