= Calvary Episcopal Church (Utica, New York) =

Historic church in New York, United States

- U.S. National Register of Historic Places
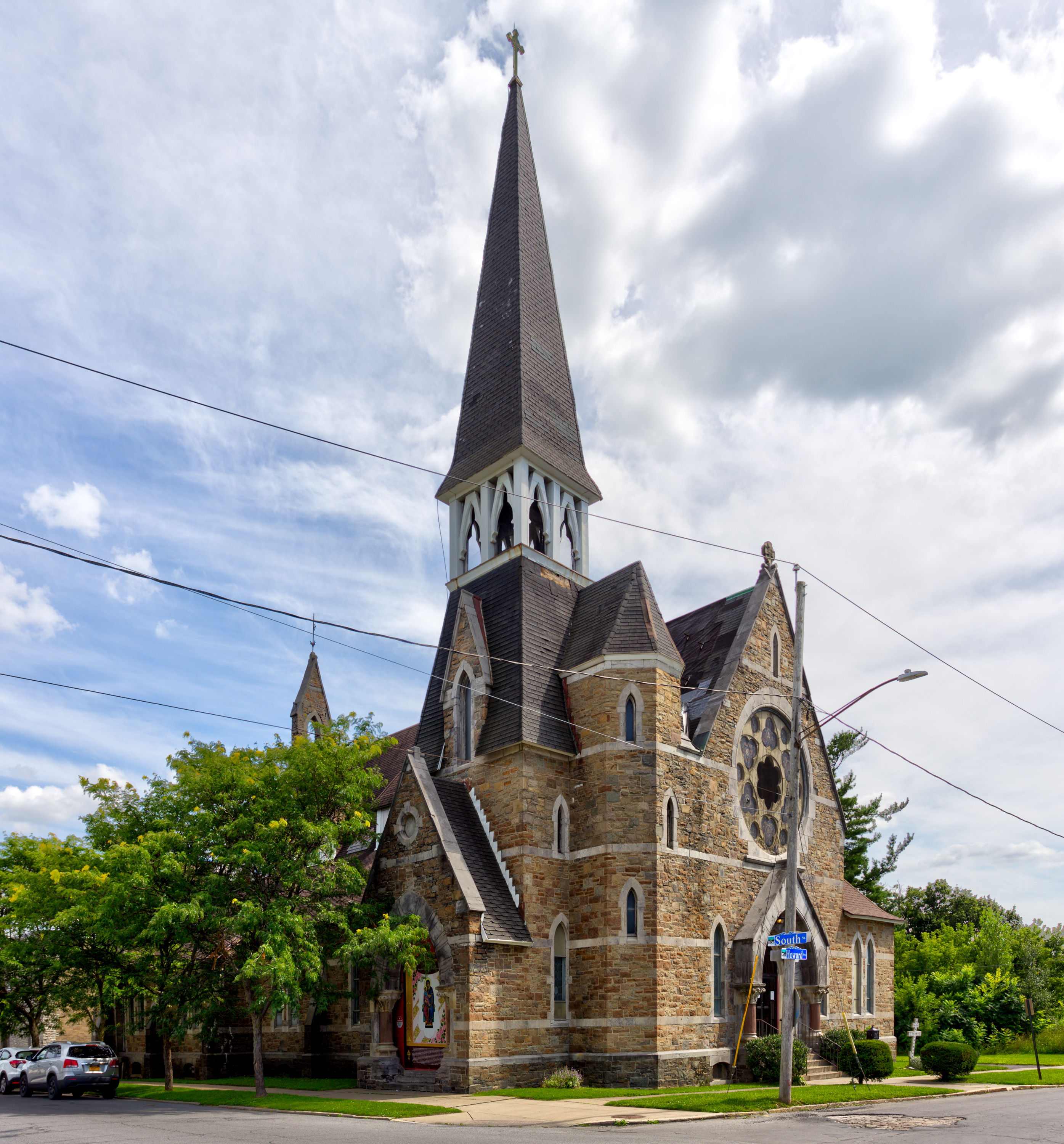

- Location within New York Location within the United States
- Location: 1101 Howard Ave, Utica, New York
- Coordinates: 43°5′42.78″N 75°13′51.84″W
- Area: less than one acre
- Built: 1870-1872
- Architect: Birt, Thomas; Congdon, Henry M.
- Architectural style: Late Gothic Revival
- NRHP reference No.: 08000595
- Added to NRHP: July 03, 2008

Calvary Episcopal Church is a historic Episcopal church building at 1101 Howard Avenue in Utica, Oneida County, New York. It was built in 1870-1872 and is an asymmetrically massed, cruciform plan structure with a rectangular nave and intersecting apse, with a substantial engaged corner tower.

It was designed by noted New York City architect Henry M. Congdon. It is currently home to the Cathedral of the Theotokos of Great Grace.

It was listed on the National Register of Historic Places in 2008.
