= St. James Episcopal Church (Cambridge, Massachusetts) =

Historic church in Massachusetts, United States

- St. James's Episcopal Church
- U.S. National Register of Historic Places
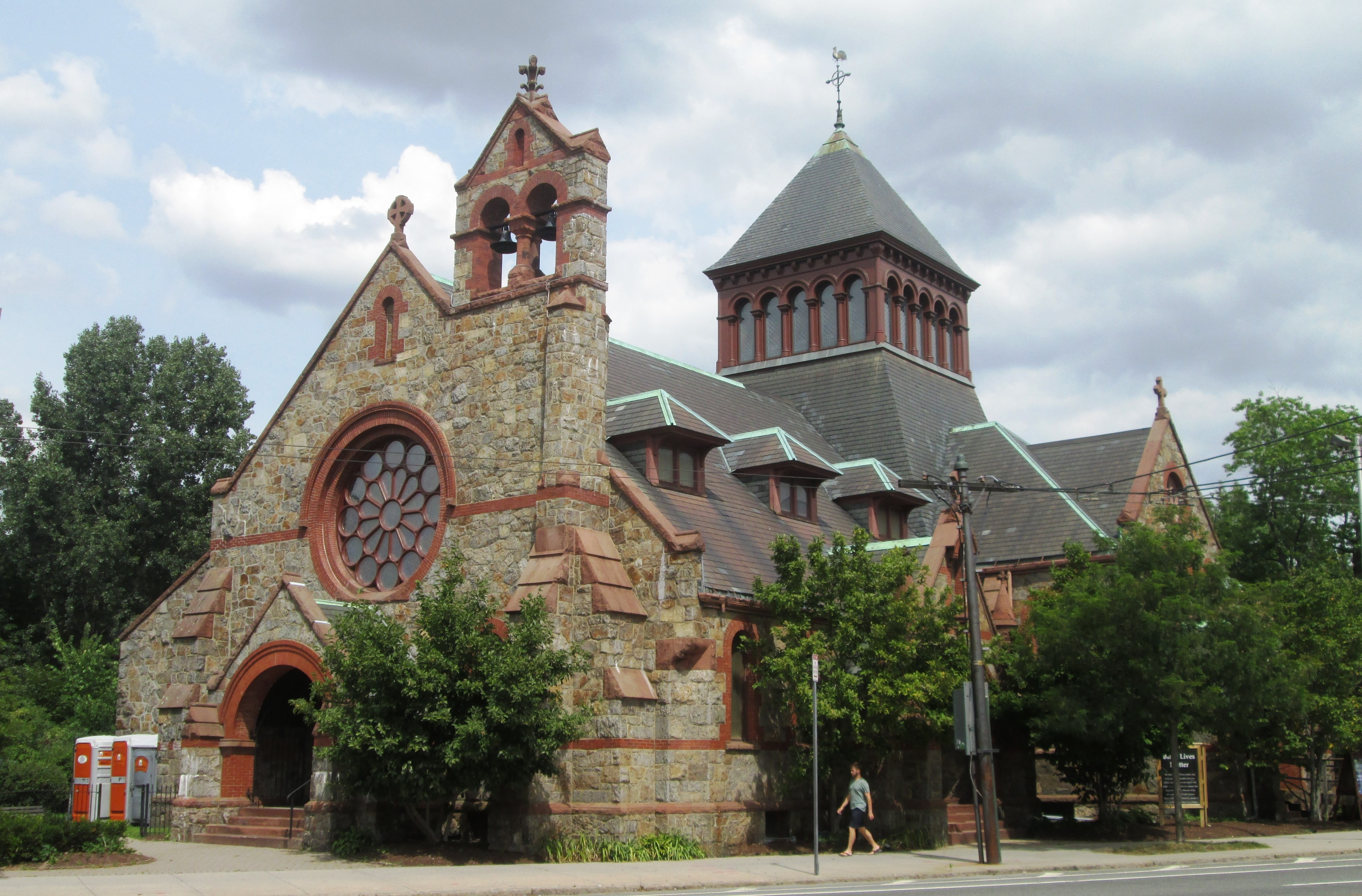
- (2017)

- Location within Massachusetts Location within the United States
- Location: Cambridge, Massachusetts
- Coordinates: 42°23′26.4″N 71°07′15.4″W
- Built: 1888
- Architect: Henry M. Congdon
- Architectural style: Romanesque
- MPS: Cambridge MRA
- NRHP reference No.: 83000828
- Added to NRHP: June 30, 1983

St. James's Episcopal Church is an historic Episcopal church at 1991 Massachusetts Avenue in Cambridge, Massachusetts. The parish was founded in 1864 as a mission from Christ Church. The Richardsonian Romanesque building was built in 1888–89 to a design by Henry M. Congdon. The church was built on the site of the Davenport Tavern, a landmark that had stood on that site since c. 1757 (a portion of which was relocated to Somerville, where it still stands).

The church reported 718 members in 2015 and 781 members in 2023; no membership statistics were reported in 2024 parochial reports. Plate and pledge income reported for the congregation in 2024 was $255,450 with average Sunday attendance (ASA) of 74 persons.

The church building was listed on the National Register of Historic Places in 1983.

== See also ==
- National Register of Historic Places listings in Cambridge, Massachusetts
