= George Cooper House =

Historic house in Iowa, United States

- U.S. National Register of Historic Places
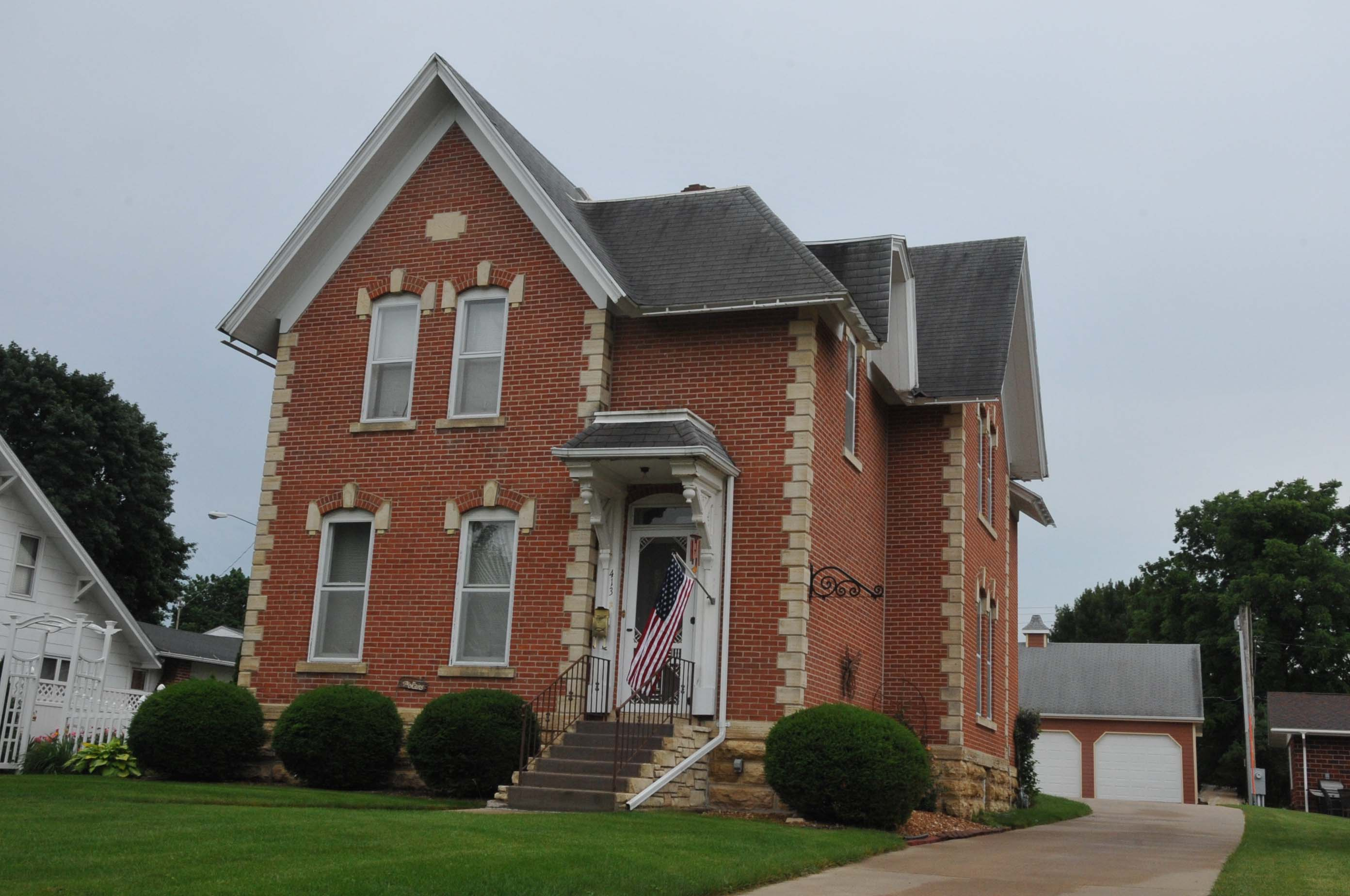

- Location within Iowa Location within the United States
- Location: 413 W. Platt St. Maquoketa, Iowa
- Coordinates: 42°04′07″N 90°40′11″W
- Area: less than one acre
- Built: 1884
- Architectural style: Late Victorian
- MPS: Maquoketa MPS
- NRHP reference No.: 91000963
- Added to NRHP: August 9, 1991

The George Cooper House is a historic residence located in Maquoketa, Iowa, United States. This is one of several Victorian houses in town that are noteworthy for their quoined corners, a rare architectural feature in Iowa. The two-story brick house features decorative gable ends, inset porches, bay window, and a gambrel dormer. It was built in 1884, which were known as financial boom years for Maquoketa. The house is located in a neighborhood with other late 19th and early 20th century houses. It was listed on the National Register of Historic Places in 1991.
