= Tunis R. Cooper House =

Historic house in New Jersey, United States

- U.S. National Register of Historic Places
- New Jersey Register of Historic Places
- Location within Bergen County, New Jersey Location within New Jersey Location within the United States
- Location: 83 Cooper Street, Bergenfield, New Jersey
- Coordinates: 40°55′50″N 74°0′9″W
- Area: 9.2 acres (3.7 ha)
- Built: 1802
- Architectural style: Federal, Gothic Revival
- NRHP reference No.: 95001046
- NJRHP No.: 433

Significant dates
- Added to NRHP: September 6, 1995
- Designated NJRHP: July 13, 1995

Tunis R. Cooper House is located in Bergenfield, Bergen County, New Jersey, United States. The house was built in 1802 and was added to the National Register of Historic Places on September 6, 1995.

The house is named after Tunis R. Cooper, a tycoon who made chairs in a factory located on the same property. The borough acquired the building sometime after 2002. It included a preservation easement stating it was to be used as a museum and now houses Bergenfield Museum Society.

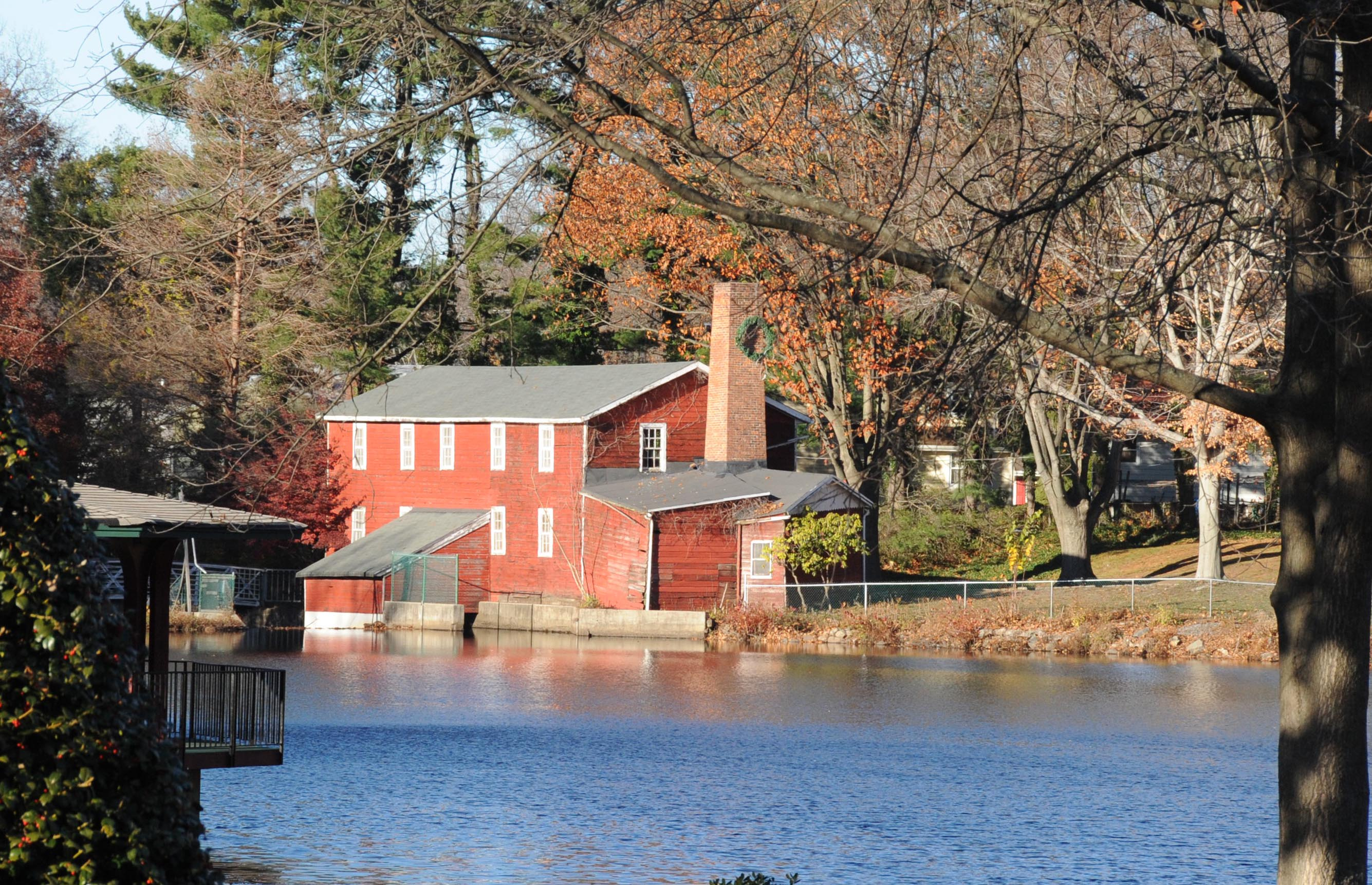
Saw mill on the property

== See also ==
- National Register of Historic Places listings in Bergen County, New Jersey
