= Judge John E. Cooper House =

- U.S. National Register of Historic Places
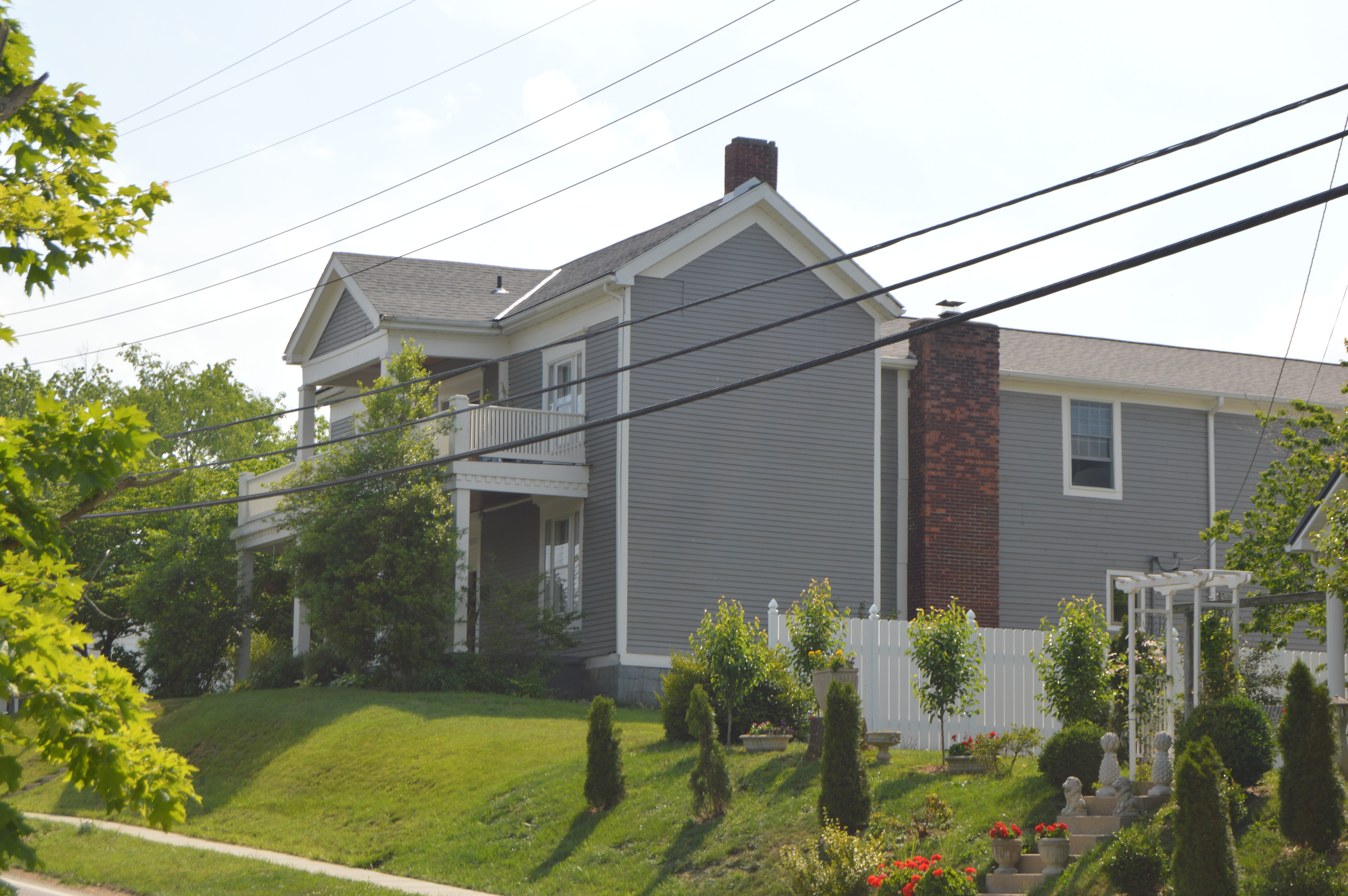
- Photo from 2014

- Location within Kentucky Location within the United States
- Location: 709 N. Main St., West Liberty, Kentucky
- Coordinates: 37°55′26″N 83°15′34″W
- Area: less than one acre
- Built: 1872
- Built by: Thomas Jefferson Cassity and Reuben Cassity
- Architectural style: I-house
- NRHP reference No.: 96000824
- Added to NRHP: August 1, 1996

The Judge John E. Cooper House, at 709 N. Main St. in West Liberty, Kentucky, was built in 1872. It was listed on the National Register of Historic Places in 1996.

It is a two-story central passage plan I-house.
