= Cooper-Davenport Tavern Wing =

Historic building in Massachusetts, United States

- Cooper–Davenport Tavern Wing
- U.S. National Register of Historic Places
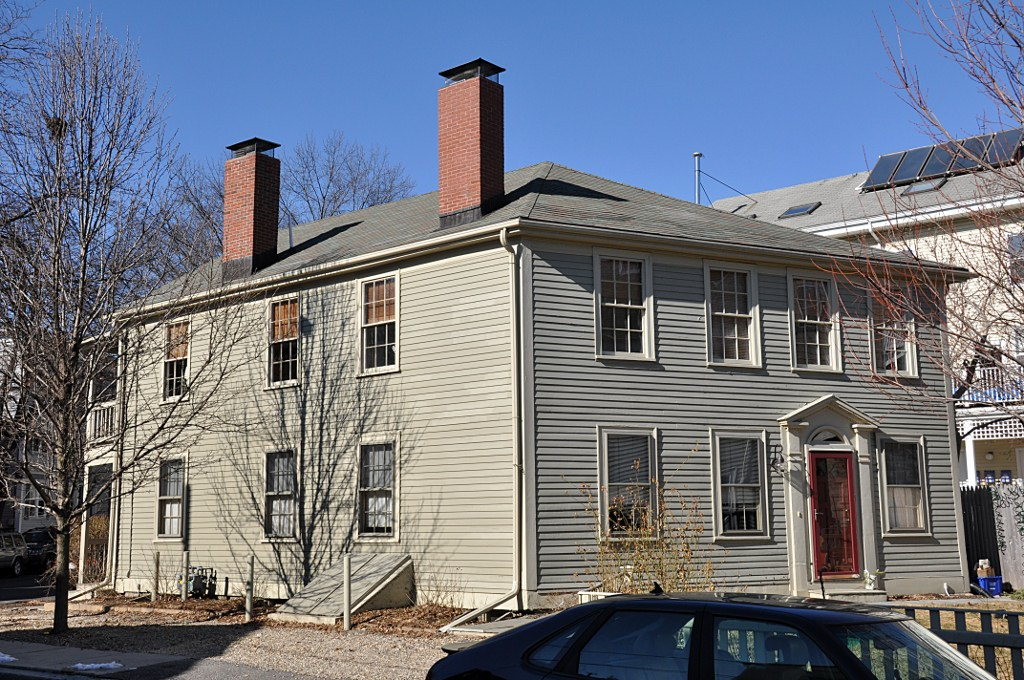

- Location within Massachusetts Location within the United States
- Location: 81 Eustis Street, Somerville, Massachusetts
- Coordinates: 42°23′0.74″N 71°6′48.92″W
- Built: 1808
- Architectural style: Federal
- MPS: Somerville MPS
- NRHP reference No.: 89001257
- Added to NRHP: September 18, 1989

The Cooper–Davenport Tavern Wing is a historic building in Somerville, Massachusetts. Built c. 1806 by John Davenport as a wing to a 1757 tavern built by Jonathan Cooper, this is one of the few Federal-period buildings to survive in the city. Moved to its present location in the 1880s, it now houses residences. The building was listed on the National Register of Historic Places in 1989.

== Description and history ==
The Cooper–Davenport Tavern Wing is located at the north corner of Harris and Eustis Streets, in a densely-built residential area on the border between Somerville and Cambridge southeast of Porter Square. The building is a roughly rectangular two-story wood-frame structure, with a hip roof and clapboard siding. The front of the building faces northeast, and is four bays wide, with the entrance in the second bay from the right. It is flanked by pilasters and topped by an eyebrow transom window and a gabled pediment. A pair of brick chimneys pierce the left side of the roof.

In 1757 Jonathan Cooper built a large house at the corner of what are now Beech Street and Massachusetts Avenue just north of what is now Porter Square. He was soon operating a tavern on the premises in what was then just beginning to develop as a commercial area. The Middlesex Turnpike opened on the route of Massachusetts Avenue in 1806, bringing additional business to the tavern. John Davenport, its owner at that time, constructed the present structure as a wing to the building Cooper built. By the 1880s the building was in decline, and the property was acquired for the construction of St. James Episcopal Church. The 1757 building was razed, and the wing was moved to its present location c. 1888. It is now used as a multi-unit residence.

== See also ==
- National Register of Historic Places listings in Somerville, Massachusetts
