= Perry-Cooper House =

Historic house in Maryland, United States

- U.S. National Register of Historic Places
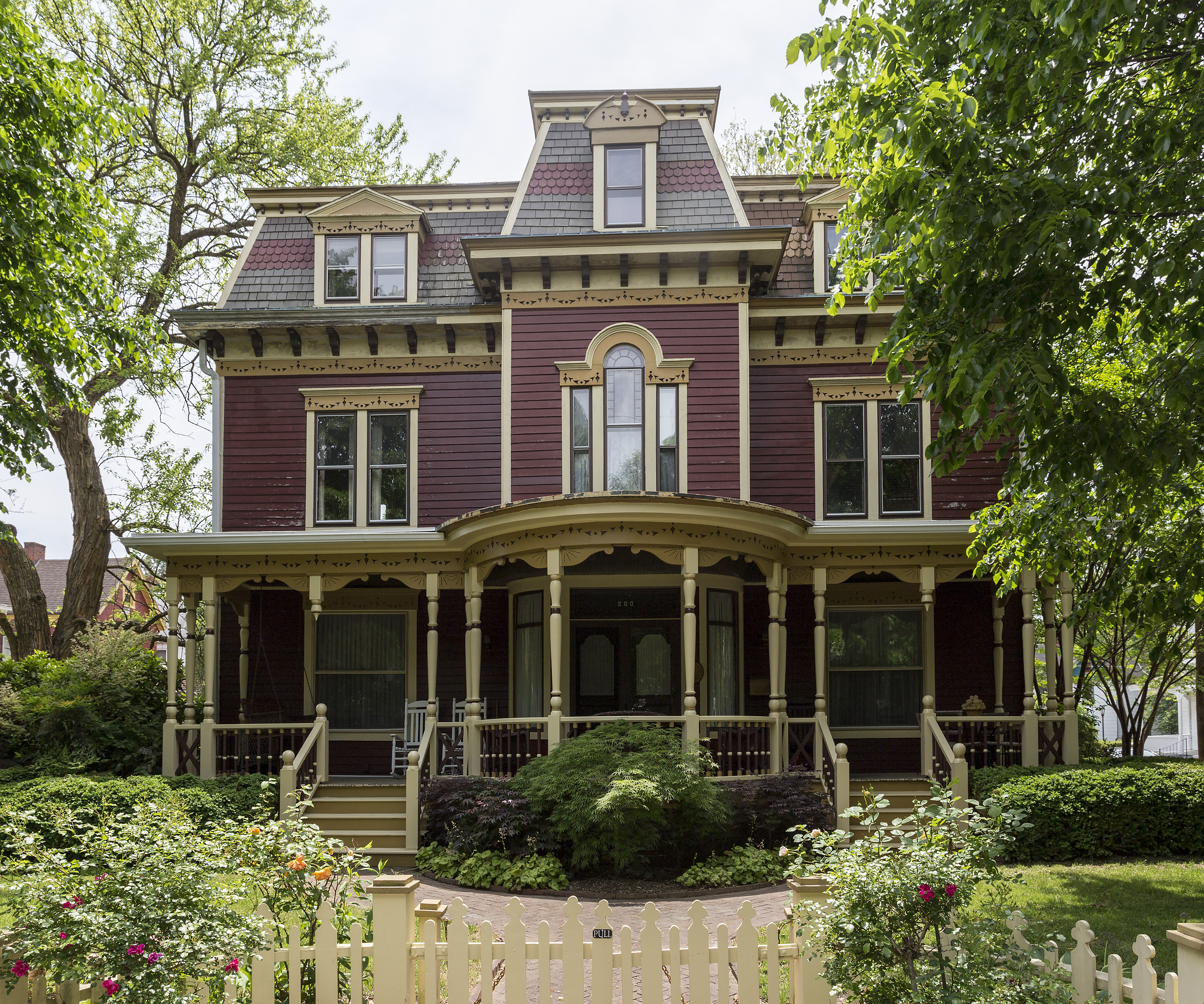

- Location within Maryland Location within the United States
- Location: 200 E. William St., Salisbury, Maryland
- Coordinates: 38°22′10″N 75°35′51″W
- Area: 0.2 acres (0.081 ha)
- Built: 1880
- Architectural style: Second Empire, Mansard
- NRHP reference No.: 77000706
- Added to NRHP: November 17, 1977

The Perry-Cooper House is a historic home located at Salisbury, Wicomico County, Maryland, United States. It is a three-story frame dwelling topped with a French mansard roof that was built about 1880. It features a central tower, with a bowed entrance on the first floor and a nine-foot-high Palladian window on the second. It was the residence of one of Salisbury's well-known civic leaders, Thomas Perry, whose family occupied the house from 1897 until 1950.

The Perry-Cooper House was listed on the National Register of Historic Places in 1977.
