= Union Baptist Church (Hartford, Connecticut) =

Historic church in Connecticut, United States

- U.S. National Register of Historic Places
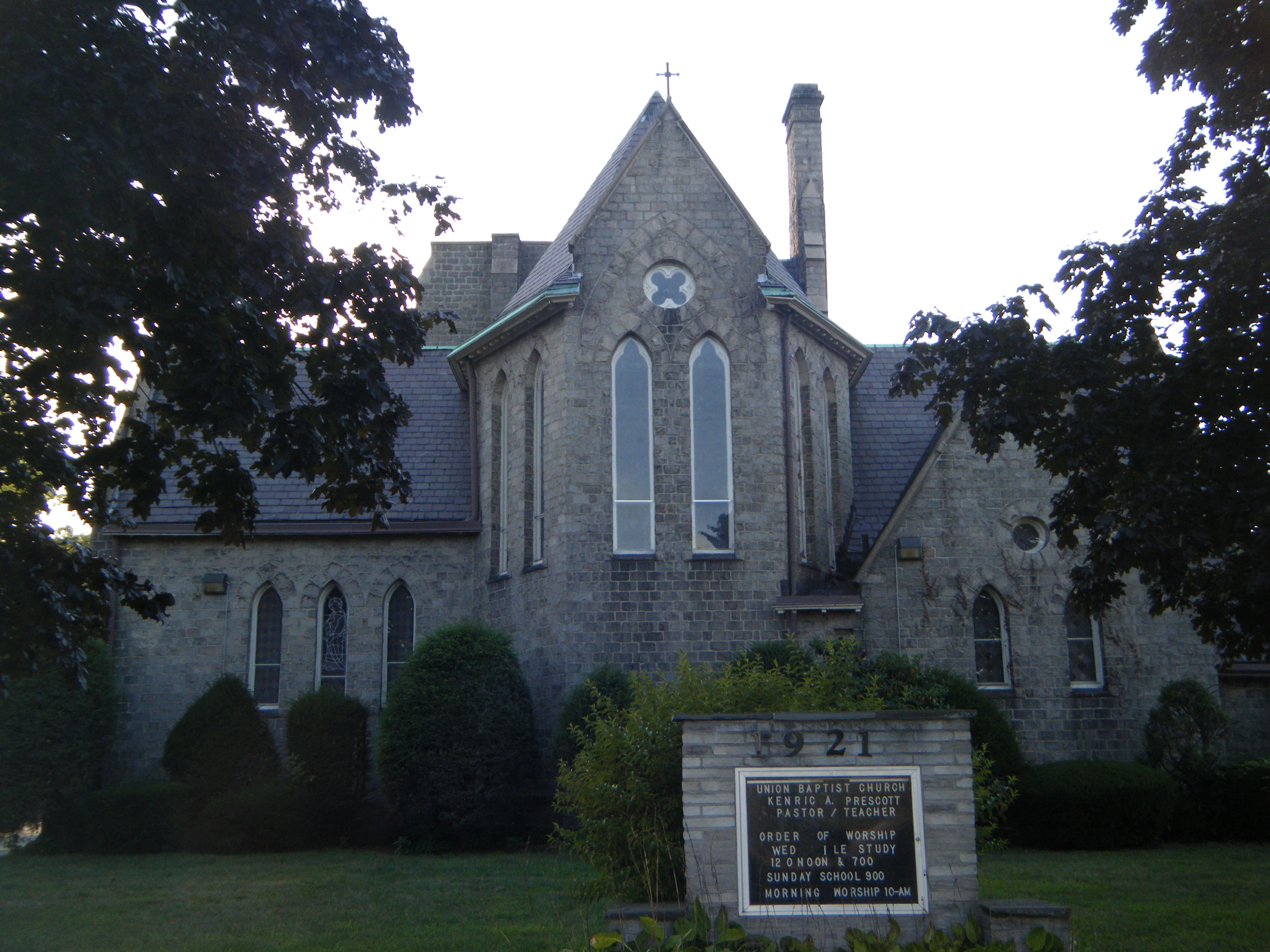

- Location within Connecticut Location within the United States
- Location: 1913 and 1921 Main Street, Hartford, Connecticut
- Coordinates: 41°46′52″N 72°40′37″W
- Area: 1 acre (0.40 ha)
- Built: 1871
- Architect: Congdon, Henry M.
- Architectural style: Gothic, Early English Gothic Revival
- NRHP reference No.: 79002634
- Added to NRHP: August 15, 1979

The Union Baptist Church is a historic church at 1913 and 1921 Main Street in Hartford, Connecticut. Originally built by an Episcopal congregation, it has for many years been home to an African-American Baptist congregation, which under the leadership of Rev. John C. Jackson (1866–1953), played a significant role in advancing the cause of civil rights in the state. The church, and its adjacent parsonage, were listed on the National Register of Historic Places in 1979.

== Architecture and history ==
The Union Baptist Church is locate in Hartford's northern Clay-Arsenal neighborhood, on the west side of Main Street near its junction with Mahl Avenue. It is an Early English Gothic stone structure, designed by Henry Martyn Congdon and built in 1871, with a number of later additions. It has a roughly cruciform plan, with a rounded apse and short transepts. The main entrance is set near the rear end of the south side, under a Stick style gabled portico. Modern additions housing offices and other facilities extend further to the rear.

The church was built in 1871, and was original known as the Saint Thomas Episcopal Church, honoring Thomas Brownell, the founder of Hartford's Trinity College. It was acquired by the Baptist congregation of Rev. John C. Jackson in 1925; this congregation had been founded in 1871 by a group of freed slaves from Virginia. Jackson was an early force in advancing civil rights in Connecticut, and is credited with securing a position for the first African-American teacher in the city's public schools. Members of the congregation have also historically occupied important civic and social positions in the community.

== See also ==
- National Register of Historic Places listings in Hartford, Connecticut
