= George and Margaret Cooper House =

Historic house in Iowa, United States

- U.S. National Register of Historic Places
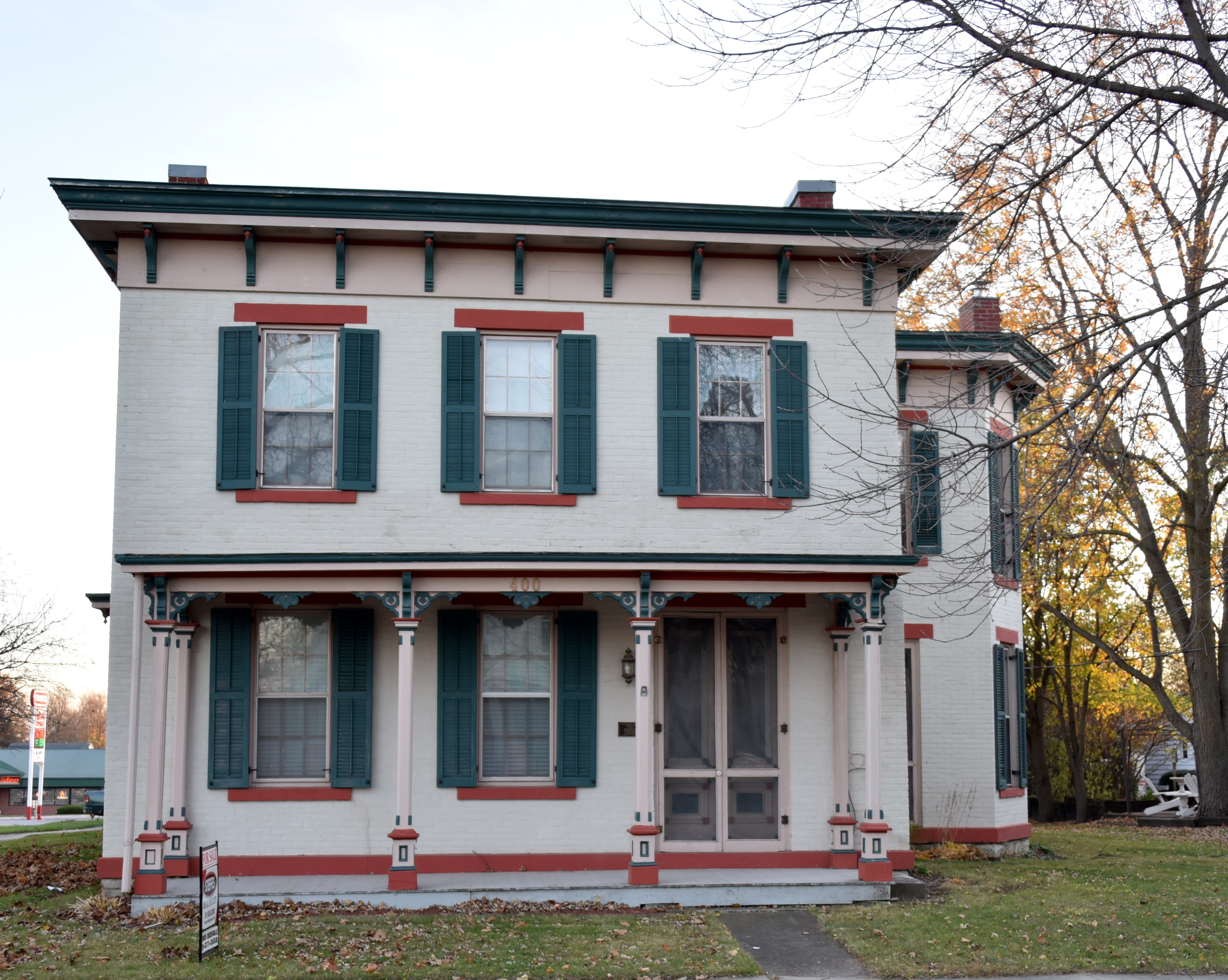

- Location within Iowa Location within the United States
- Location: 400 W. Monroe St. Mount Pleasant, Iowa
- Coordinates: 40°58′0.5″N 91°33′27.2″W
- Area: less than one acre
- Built: 1856
- Architectural style: Italianate
- NRHP reference No.: 97000393
- Added to NRHP: May 2, 1997

The George and Margaret Cooper House is a historic building located in Mount Pleasant, Iowa, United States. It is a fine example of the Italianate style, which was a popular style for residential architecture in Mount Pleasant from the 1850s to the mid-1880s The two-story brick house features an asymmetrical plan, a low-pitched hip roof, wide bracketed eaves, and long, narrow windows. The full-width front porch has square paneled columns with foliate designs in the capitals and brackets. A single-story wing is attached to the rear of the house. A two-story, five sided wing was added to the west side of the house about ten years after the main part of the house was built. The house was built for George Cooper, a taylor, and it remained in his family until 1921. It was listed on the National Register of Historic Places in 1997.
