= Thunise & Richard Cooper House =

Historic house in New Jersey, United States

- U.S. National Register of Historic Places
- New Jersey Register of Historic Places
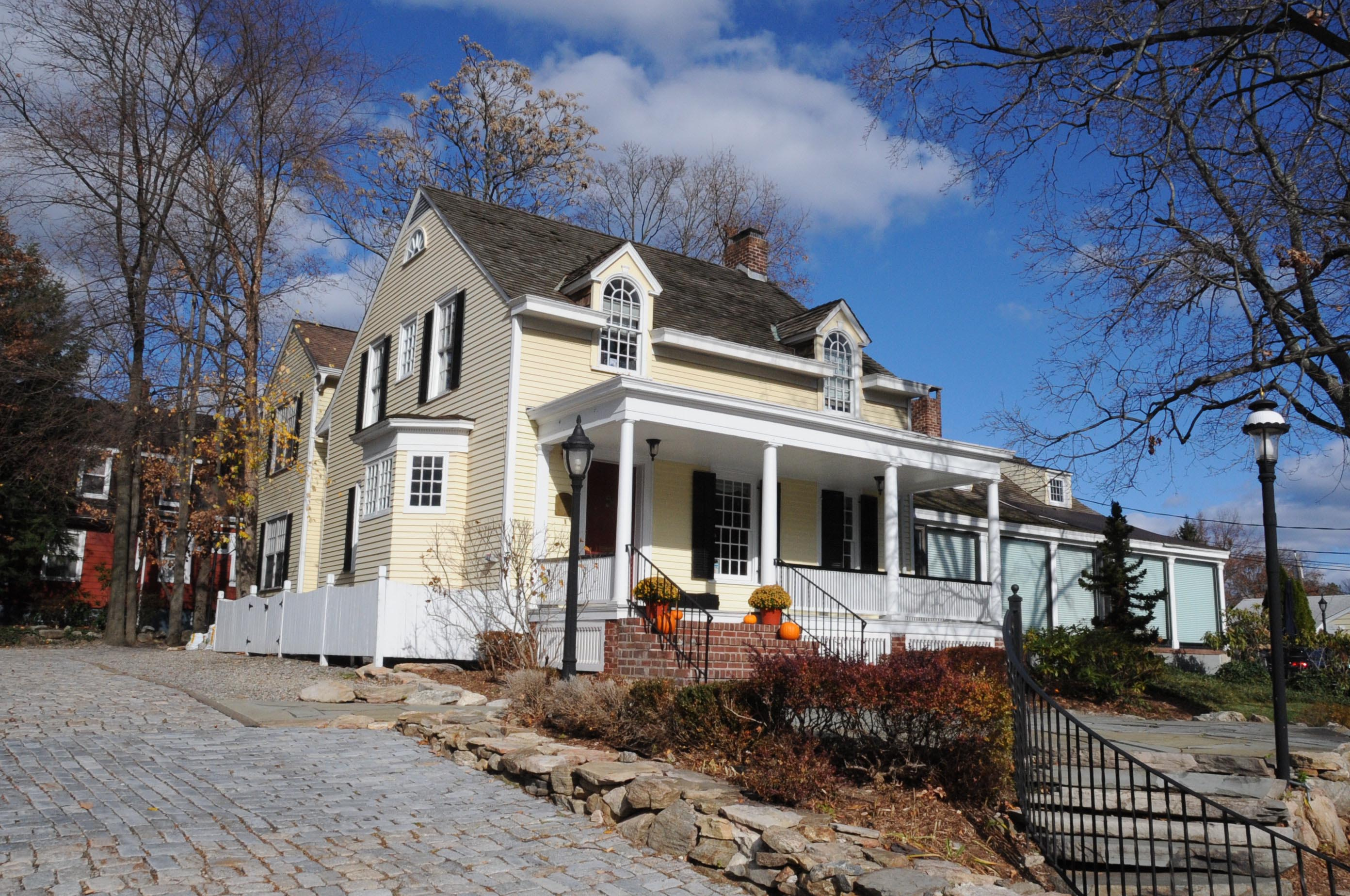
- Thunise & Richard Cooper House in 2015

- Location within Bergen County, New Jersey Location within New Jersey Location within the United States
- Location: 608-610 Brookside Avenue, Oradell, New Jersey
- Coordinates: 40°56′55″N 74°1′53″W
- Area: 0.3 acres (0.12 ha)
- Built: 1760
- Architectural style: Colonial Revival, Federal, Vernacular Late Federal
- NRHP reference No.: 85002182
- NJRHP No.: 610

Significant dates
- Added to NRHP: September 12, 1985
- Designated NJRHP: July 29, 1985

Thunise & Richard Cooper House is located in Oradell, Bergen County, New Jersey, United States. The house was built in 1760 and was added to the National Register of Historic Places on September 12, 1985.

== See also ==
- National Register of Historic Places listings in Bergen County, New Jersey
