= Cooper Hall =

- U.S. National Register of Historic Places
- Cooper Hall in 2026

- Location within Kansas Location within the United States
- Location: N. Broadway Ave., Sterling, Kansas
- Coordinates: 38°13′18″N 98°12′27″W
- Area: 3 acres (1.2 ha)
- Built: 1887
- Built by: Evans, George, H.
- Architects: Gall, William
- NRHP reference No.: 74000845
- Added to NRHP: May 3, 1974

Cooper Hall, known also as Cooper Memorial College Building, located on N. Broadway Ave. in Sterling, Kansas, was built in 1887. It was listed on the National Register of Historic Places in 1974.

It was the main building of Cooper Memorial College. It is a three-story irregularly shaped building on an approximately 120 by 50 feet (37 m × 15 m) plan. It has a tower which rises about 75 feet (23 m).
