= St. Charles Elementary School =

St. Charles Elementary School can refer to:

Canada:

- St. Charles Elementary School - Montreal, Quebec - Lester B. Pearson School Board

United States:

- St. Charles School - San Carlos, California
- St. Charles Street Elementary School - Jeanerette, Louisiana - Iberia Parish School Board
- St. Charles Elementary School - Thibodeaux, Louisiana - Lafourche Parish School District
- St. Charles Elementary School - Saint Charles, Michigan - St. Charles Community Schools
- St. Charles Elementary School - Saint Charles, Minnesota - St. Charles Public Schools

== See also ==
- St Charles' Primary School, Scotland
