= St. Charles School District =

St. Charles School District may refer to:

- St. Charles Community Schools, St. Charles, Michigan
- St. Charles Community Unit School District 303, near Chicago, Illinois
- St. Charles Parish Public School System, Luling, Louisiana
- St. Charles Public Schools, St. Charles, Minnesota
- City of St. Charles School District, St, Charles, Missouri
