= St. Charles City Bakery =

- U.S. National Register of Historic Places
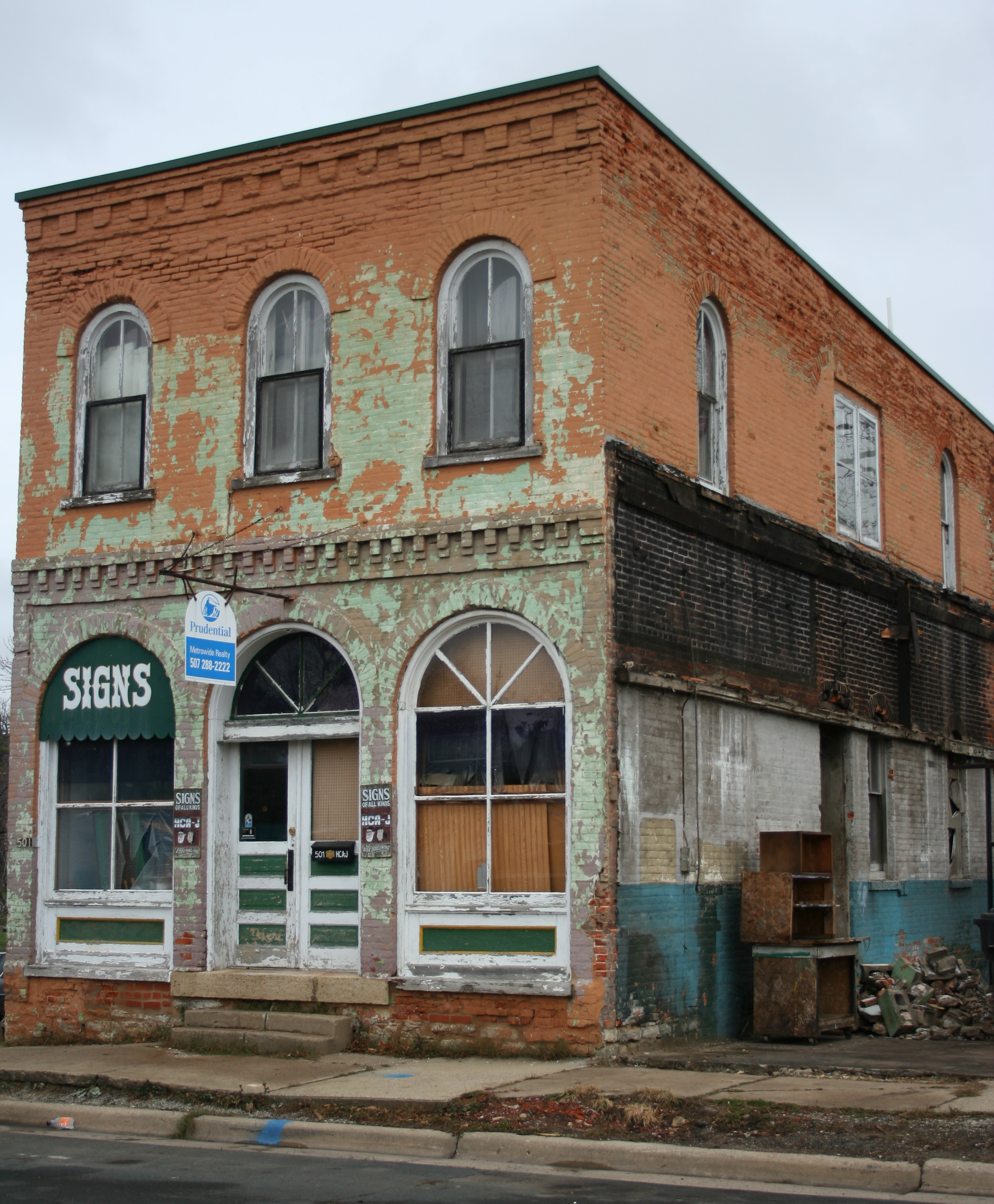
- The St. Charles City Bakery viewed from the southwest

- Location within Minnesota Location within the United States
- Location: 501 Whitewater Avenue, St. Charles, Minnesota
- Coordinates: 43°58′22.3″N 92°3′53″W
- Area: Less than one acre
- Built: 1876
- Built by: Conrad Bohn
- Architectural style: Italianate
- NRHP reference No.: 84001723
- Designated: August 9, 1984

The St. Charles City Bakery is a historic commercial building constructed in St. Charles, Minnesota, United States, in 1876. It was listed on the National Register of Historic Places in 1984 for its local significance in the theme of commerce. It was nominated for being the last remnant of St. Charles' original business district, which was lost to an 1891 fire and relocation to a more central, trackside location.

== Description ==
The St. Charles City Bakery is a two-story brick building with a footprint of 20 by 40 feet (6.1 by 12.2 m). It stands on a limestone basement. The semicircular arches over the windows and doors are characteristic of Italianate architecture, a popular style at the time of its construction.

The principle façade, facing west, has a central entryway flanked by a symmetrical window on either side. Wood panels under the two windows complement the paneling of the double doors. All three apertures are topped by semicircular windows set into brick arches and divided into four equal wedges by muntins. A belt course between the first and second floors and a cornice at the roofline bring some low-relief decoration to the otherwise plain façade.

The building originally had exposed red brick, but the walls have since been painted over. A wooden stairway on the north side, leading up to a second-floor entry at what was once just a window, is also a later addition. A one-story wing of concrete block was added to the south in 1913. This was later removed and then replaced with a metal shed.

== History ==
The community of St. Charles was platted in 1854 while the town of Chattanooga arose just half a mile (.8 km) to the south. In 1864 the Winona and St. Peter Railroad routed tracks between the two towns. New businesses began appearing along Whitewater Avenue stretching away from both downtowns toward the new tracks. By 1868 the wheat fields between the two communities had disappeared, and Chattanooga formally merged into the city of St. Charles.

The intersection of Whitewater Avenue and 5th Street (then still called Winona Street) continued to form the heart of St. Charles' main business district. In 1876 local baker Frederick Kuebler commissioned Conrad Bohn to construct a new brick building for his bakery on the intersection's southeast corner. The new bakery was an early example of the more-permanent brick and stone buildings that were replacing the community's original wood-frame businesses.

By 1891, Frederick Kuebler's bakery had become the headquarters of the St. Charles Times. On April 26 of that year a major fire destroyed three blocks of downtown St. Charles. The former bakery was one of only two commercial buildings to survive the devastation. Rather than rebuild in what by then had become the north end of town, a new downtown arose three blocks to the south. This location was more central for merged St. Charles and adjacent to the Winona and Southwestern Railway facilities that had been laid down the year before. The Whitewater Avenue Commercial Historic District preserves a row of seven buildings from this new construction. Meanwhile, the commercial beginnings of St. Charles were all but erased. The St. Charles City Bakery building is the only surviving remnant of the original downtown.

== See also ==
- National Register of Historic Places listings in Winona County, Minnesota
