= St. Charles Public Library =

Public library in St. Charles, Minnesota

- 43.96794°N 92.06584°W
- Location: 125 West 11th Street; St. Charles MN 55972
- Established: 1888

Collection
- Size: 24,000

Access and use
- Circulation: 44,000

Other information
- Director: Sharon Grossardt
- Employees: 4
- Website: http://www.stcharlesmn.org

The St. Charles Public Library is a library in St. Charles, Minnesota. It is a member of Southeastern Libraries Cooperating, the southeast Minnesota library region. The library's annual circulation is 44,000 and houses a collection of 23,000 books, magazines, CDs, and DVDs.
