= Trinity Episcopal Church (St. Charles, Minnesota) =

Historic church in Minnesota, United States

- U.S. National Register of Historic Places
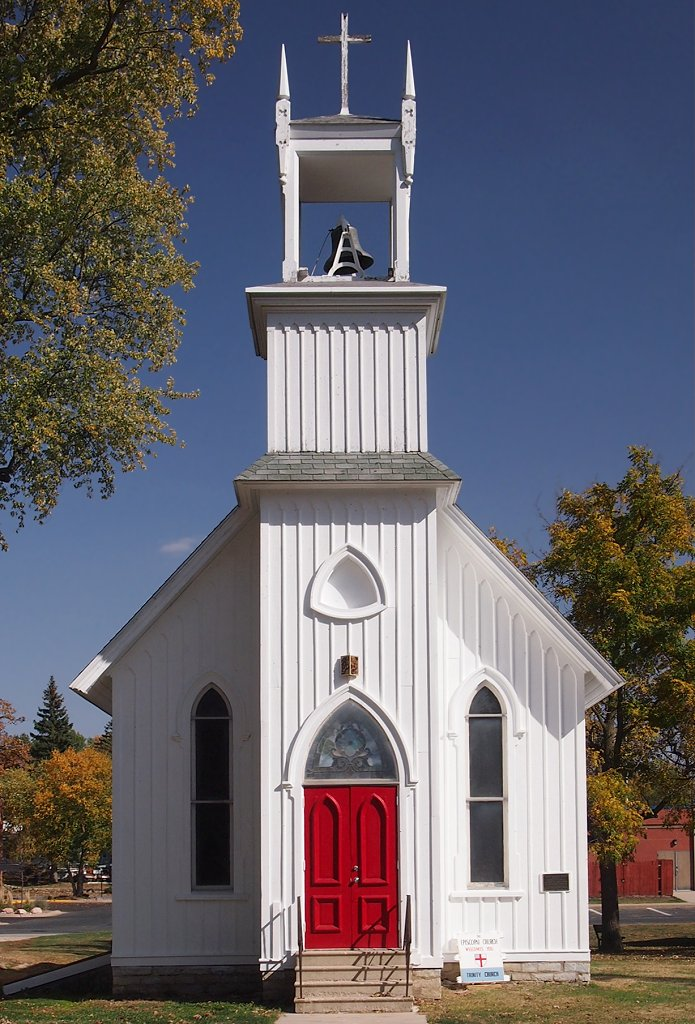
- Trinity Episcopal Church in 2012

- Location within Minnesota Location within the United States
- Location: 807 St. Charles Avenue, St. Charles, Minnesota
- Coordinates: 43°58′10″N 92°3′58″W
- Area: Less than one acre
- Built: 1874
- Architectural style: Carpenter Gothic
- NRHP reference No.: 84001726
- Added to NRHP: August 9, 1984

Trinity Episcopal Church is a historic church building in St. Charles, Minnesota, United States, constructed in 1874. It was listed on the National Register of Historic Places in 1984 for having local significance in the theme of architecture. It was nominated for the high integrity of its Carpenter Gothic design, well preserved in both the exterior and interior.

The church's board and batten walls, lancet windows, and bell tower with an open belfry are typical of Carpenter Gothic style architecture, which was common for churches established under Bishop Henry Benjamin Whipple. It is no longer in use as a church and is included now on city park property just west of the city hall.

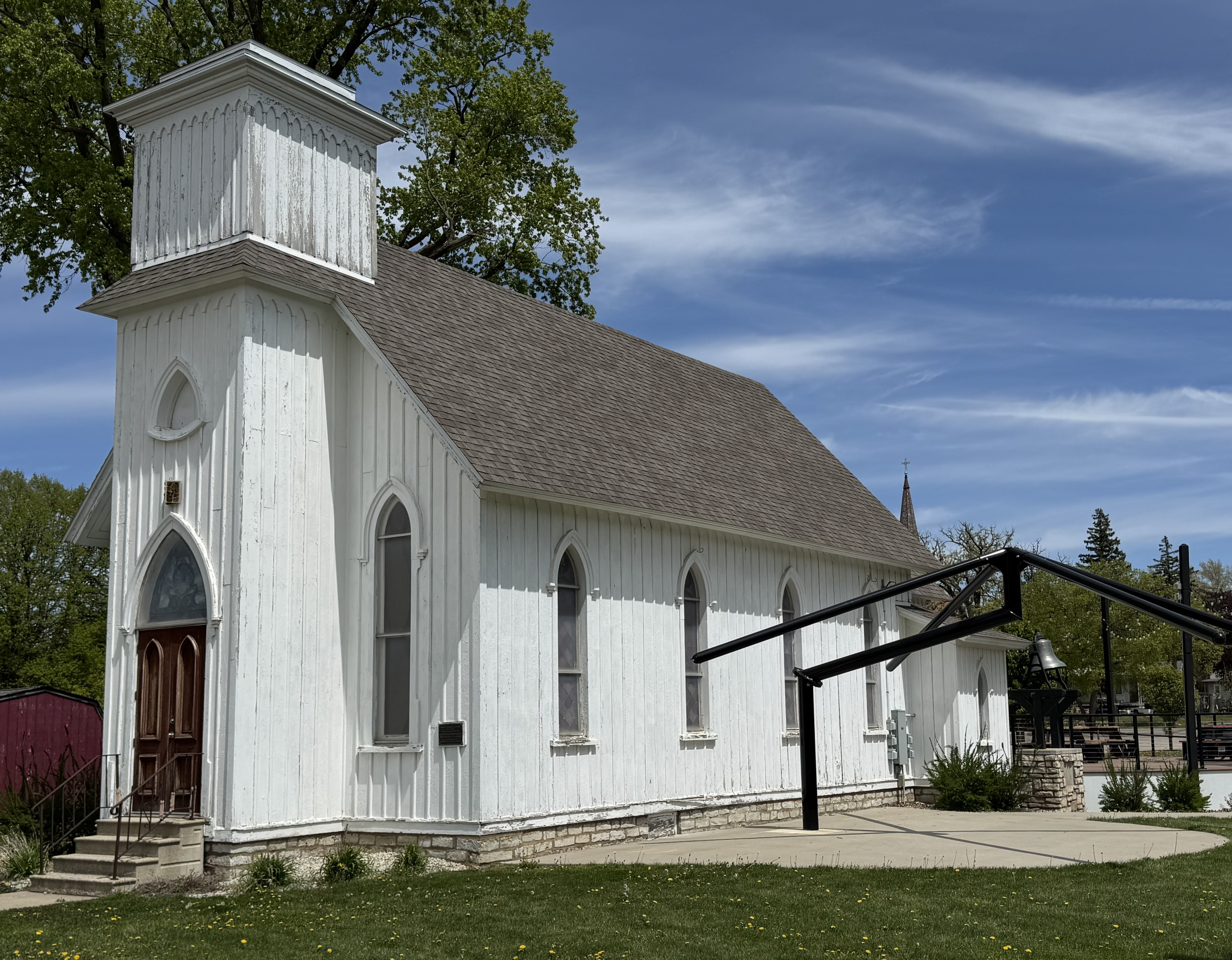
The church from the southwest in 2026, after the bell tower was removed

== See also ==
- List of Anglican churches
- National Register of Historic Places listings in Winona County, Minnesota
