= St. Charles, Minnesota =

City in Minnesota, United States

St. Charles
- City
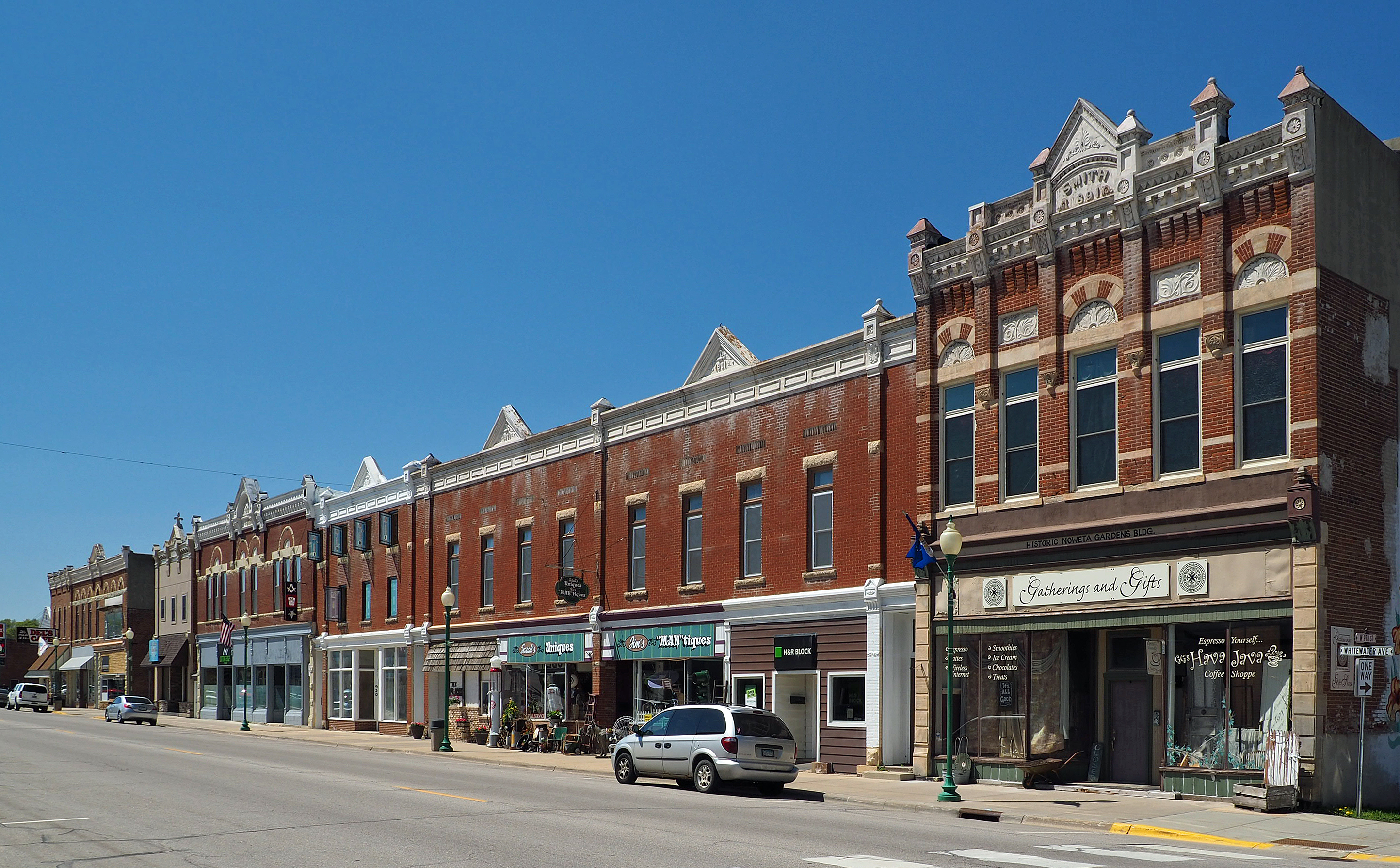
- Historic Whitewater Avenue in St. Charles
- Nickname: Gateway to Whitewater
- Motto: City with a Smile
- Location of St. Charles, Minnesota
- Coordinates: 43°58′07″N 92°03′33″W
- Country: United States
- State: Minnesota
- County: Winona

Government
  - Type: Mayor - Council

Area
  - Total: 3.78 sq mi (9.79 km^{2})
  - Land: 3.78 sq mi (9.79 km^{2})
  - Water: 0 sq mi (0.00 km^{2})
- Elevation: 1,132 ft (345 m)

Population (2020)
  - Total: 3,990
  - Density: 994.5/sq mi (383.98/km^{2})
- Time zone: UTC-6 (Central (CST))
  - Summer (DST): UTC-5 (CDT)
- ZIP code: 55972
- Area code: 507
- FIPS code: 27-56788
- GNIS feature ID: 2396477
- Website: https://www.cityofstcharlesmn.gov/

St. Charles is a city in Winona County, Minnesota, United States. The population was 3,990 at the 2020 census, up from 3,735 in 2010. It promotes itself as the gateway to Whitewater State Park, which is 7 miles (11 km) north of the city on Minnesota State Highway 74.

== History ==
St. Charles was laid out in 1854, and named for Saint Charles Borromeo (1538–1584), an Italian saint and cardinal. A post office has been in operation at St. Charles since 1855. St. Charles was incorporated in 1870.

The city was evacuated on April 17, 2009, when a large fire at North Star Foods, a poultry processing plant, threatened anhydrous ammonia tanks. Residents were allowed to return the next day.

Three properties in St. Charles are listed on the National Register of Historic Places: the 1874 Trinity Episcopal Church, the 1876 St. Charles City Bakery, and the 1890s Whitewater Avenue Commercial Historic District.

== Geography and transportation ==
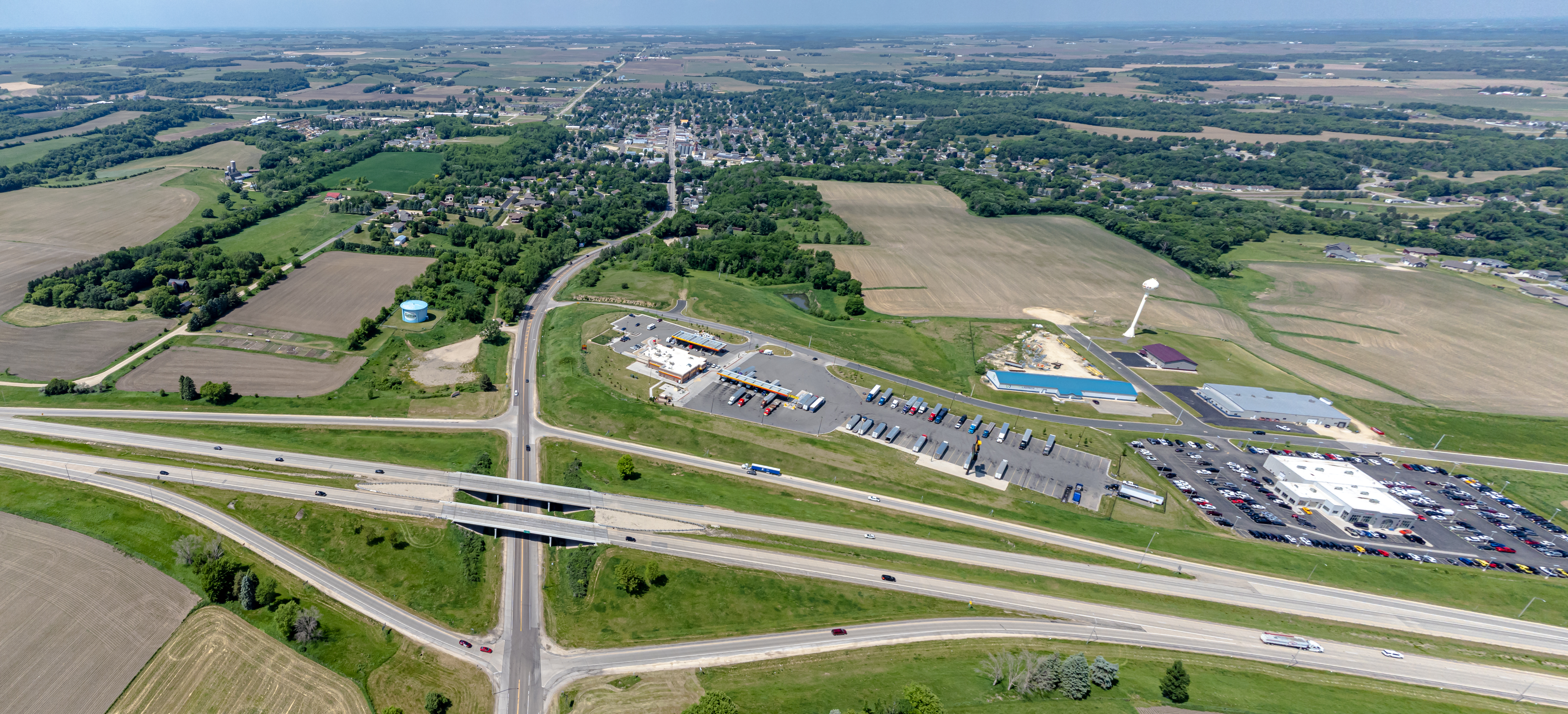
St. Charles, Minnesota

According to the United States Census Bureau, the city has an area of 3.86 square miles (10.00 km^{2}), all land.

U.S. Highway 14 bisects the city from east to west, as does the Dakota, Minnesota and Eastern Railroad. Minnesota State Highway 74 goes through the city from south to north, running along Whitewater Avenue, also known as Main Street. A freeway entrance to Interstate 90 is immediately south of the city.

The Whitewater River runs through the northern part of the city.

== Demographics ==
Historical population
Census	Pop.	Note	%±
1870	1,151		—
1880	1,155		0.3%
1890	1,178		2.0%
1900	1,304		10.7%
1910	1,159		−11.1%
1920	1,351		16.6%
1930	1,311		−3.0%
1940	1,507		15.0%
1950	1,548		2.7%
1960	1,882		21.6%
1970	1,942		3.2%
1980	2,184		12.5%
1990	2,642		21.0%
2000	3,295		24.7%
2010	3,735		13.4%
2020	3,990		6.8%
U.S. Decennial Census

=== 2020 census ===
As of the 2020 census, St. Charles had a population of 3,990. The median age was 35.8 years. 26.5% of residents were under the age of 18 and 15.8% of residents were 65 years of age or older. For every 100 females there were 101.1 males, and for every 100 females age 18 and over there were 96.5 males age 18 and over.

0.0% of residents lived in urban areas, while 100.0% lived in rural areas.

There were 1,550 households in St. Charles, of which 34.2% had children under the age of 18 living in them. Of all households, 54.5% were married-couple households, 15.9% were households with a male householder and no spouse or partner present, and 21.9% were households with a female householder and no spouse or partner present. About 26.1% of all households were made up of individuals and 12.8% had someone living alone who was 65 years of age or older.

There were 1,632 housing units, of which 5.0% were vacant. The homeowner vacancy rate was 0.8% and the rental vacancy rate was 9.3%.

Racial composition as of the 2020 census
Race	Number	Percent
White	3,396	85.1%
Black or African American	31	0.8%
American Indian and Alaska Native	7	0.2%
Asian	97	2.4%
Native Hawaiian and Other Pacific Islander	0	0.0%
Some other race	222	5.6%
Two or more races	237	5.9%
Hispanic or Latino (of any race)	365	9.1%

=== 2010 census ===
As of the census of 2010, there were 3,735 people, 1,416 households, and 985 families living in the city. The population density was 967.6 inhabitants per square mile (373.6/km^{2}). There were 1,532 housing units at an average density of 396.9 per square mile (153.2/km^{2}). The racial makeup of the city was 91.8% White, 0.6% African American, 0.3% Native American, 2.5% Asian, 3.0% from other races, and 1.8% from two or more races. Hispanic or Latino of any race were 8.8% of the population.

There were 1,416 households, of which 36.4% had children under the age of 18 living with them, 55.7% were married couples living together, 10.1% had a female householder with no husband present, 3.7% had a male householder with no wife present, and 30.4% were non-families. 26.2% of all households were made up of individuals, and 12.5% had someone living alone who was 65 years of age or older. The average household size was 2.60 and the average family size was 3.15.

The median age in the city was 35.8 years. 28% of residents were under the age of 18; 7.9% were between the ages of 18 and 24; 26.3% were from 25 to 44; 22.8% were from 45 to 64; and 14.9% were 65 years of age or older. The gender makeup of the city was 49.6% male and 50.4% female.

=== 2000 census ===
As of the census of 2000, there were 3,295 people, 1,238 households, and 870 families living in the city. The population density was 1,005.3 inhabitants per square mile (388.1/km^{2}). There were 1,276 housing units at an average density of 389.3 per square mile (150.3/km^{2}). The racial makeup of the city was 91.62% White, 0.97% African American, 0.27% Native American, 3.61% Asian, 0.09% Pacific Islander, 2.70% from other races, and 0.73% from two or more races. Hispanic or Latino of any race were 4.95% of the population.

There were 1,238 households, out of which 37.8% had children under the age of 18 living with them, 58.1% were married couples living together, 9.2% had a female householder with no husband present, and 29.7% were non-families. 23.6% of all households were made up of individuals, and 11.6% had someone living alone who was 65 years of age or older. The average household size was 2.61 and the average family size was 3.13.

In the city, the population was spread out, with 29.3% under the age of 18, 9.1% from 18 to 24, 28.9% from 25 to 44, 17.1% from 45 to 64, and 15.6% who were 65 years of age or older. The median age was 33 years. For every 100 females, there were 95.1 males. For every 100 females age 18 and over, there were 92.5 males.

The median income for a household in the city was $42,813, and the median income for a family was $50,375. Males had a median income of $31,653 versus $23,173 for females. The per capita income for the city was $17,727. About 7.5% of families and 9.1% of the population were below the poverty line, including 11.5% of those under age 18 and 12.1% of those age 65 or over.

== Education ==
St. Charles is part of the St. Charles Public Schools and houses both the elementary and St. Charles High School. There is also St. Charles Public Library.

== Art and culture ==
The annual city festival is Gladiolus Days, held the weekend before Labor Day. It honors Carl H. Fischer, a resident who created a business, Noweta Gardens, that developed hundreds of different varieties of gladiolus. St. Charles is known as the Gladiolus Capitol of the World.

== Notable people ==
- Erastus Milo Cravath (1833–1900), field secretary with the American Missionary Association, spent his last years at St. Charles
- P/O Arthur Donahue (1913–1942), pilot who fought with the Royal Air Force and died during the Battle of Britain in the Second World War.
- George W. Kiefer (1891–1943), lawyer and Minnesota state legislator
- Carl H. Fischer (1907–2005), floriculturalist
- Brad Nessler, CBS college sports commentator

== Images ==
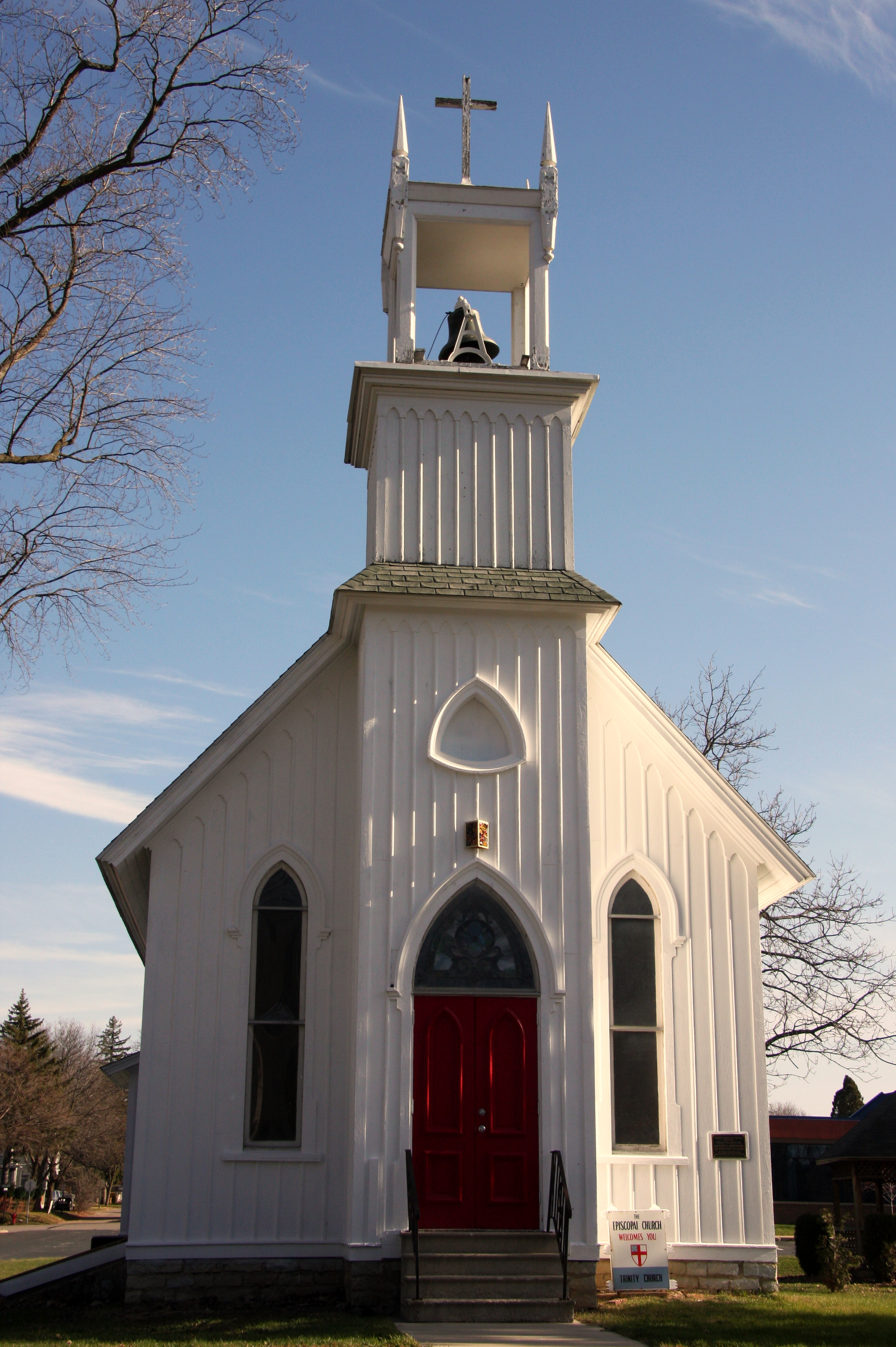
Historic Trinity Episcopal Church, now a city park

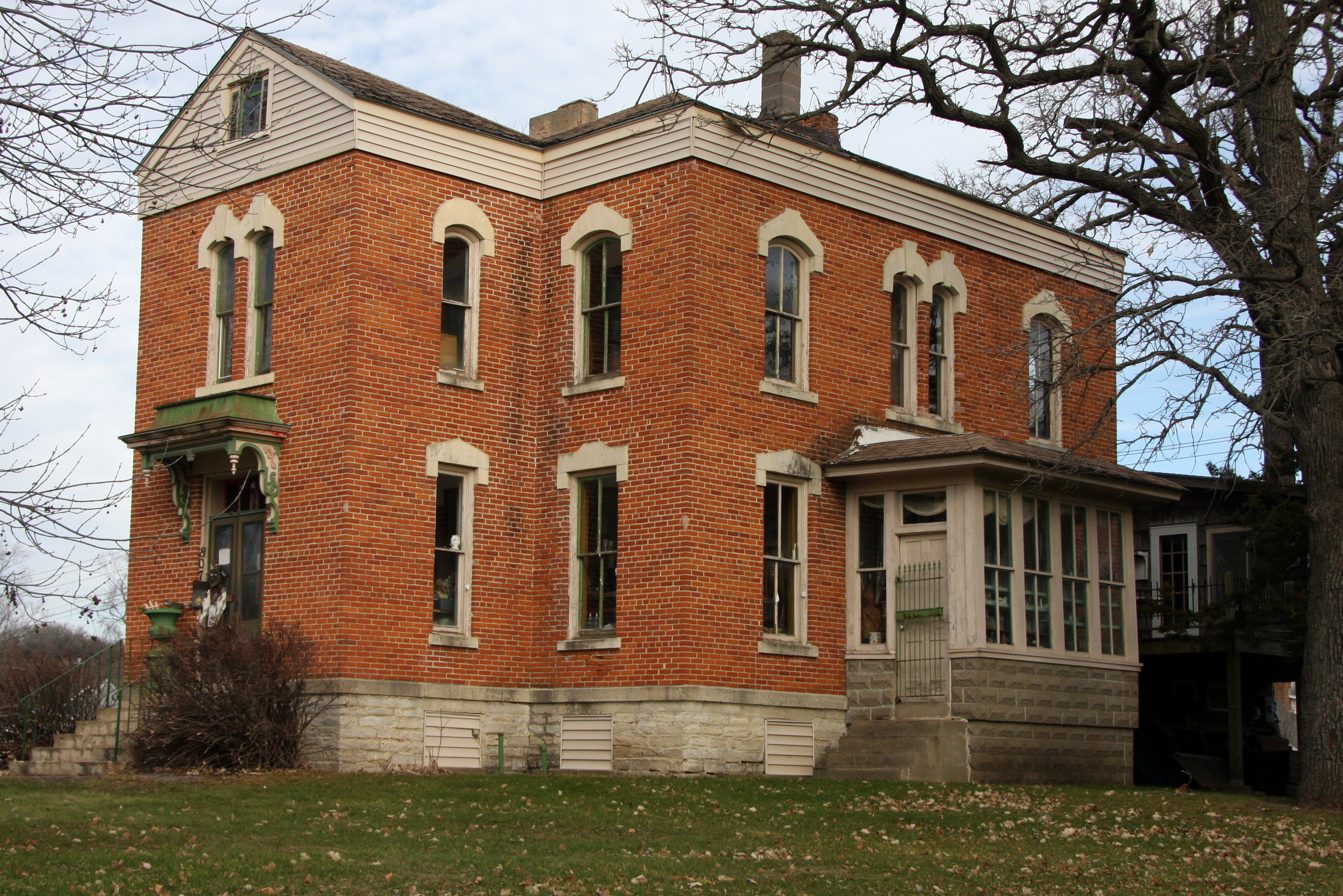
House of Hidden Treasure, one of the oldest homes in the city, now an antique shop

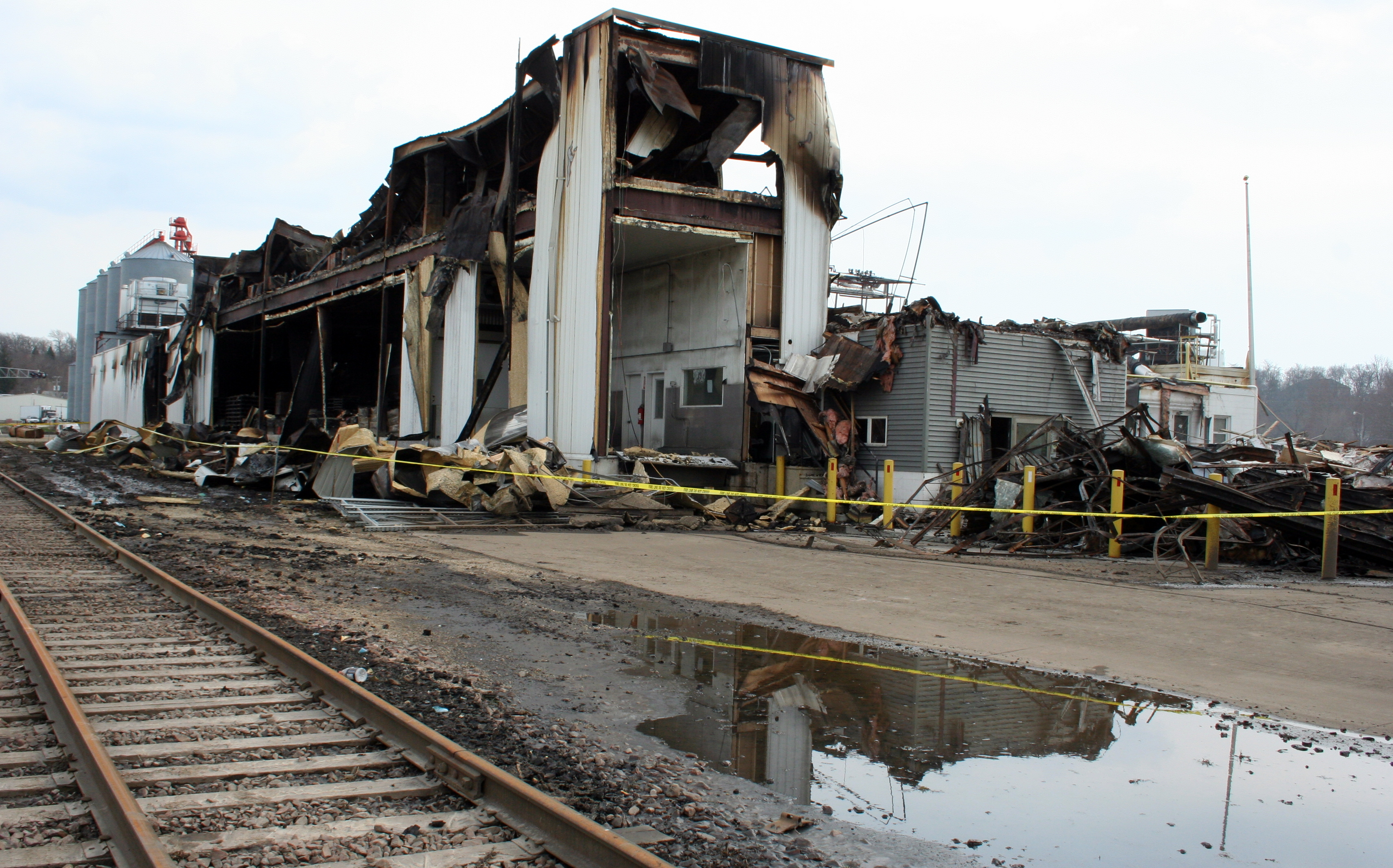
North Star Foods the day after it was destroyed by fire

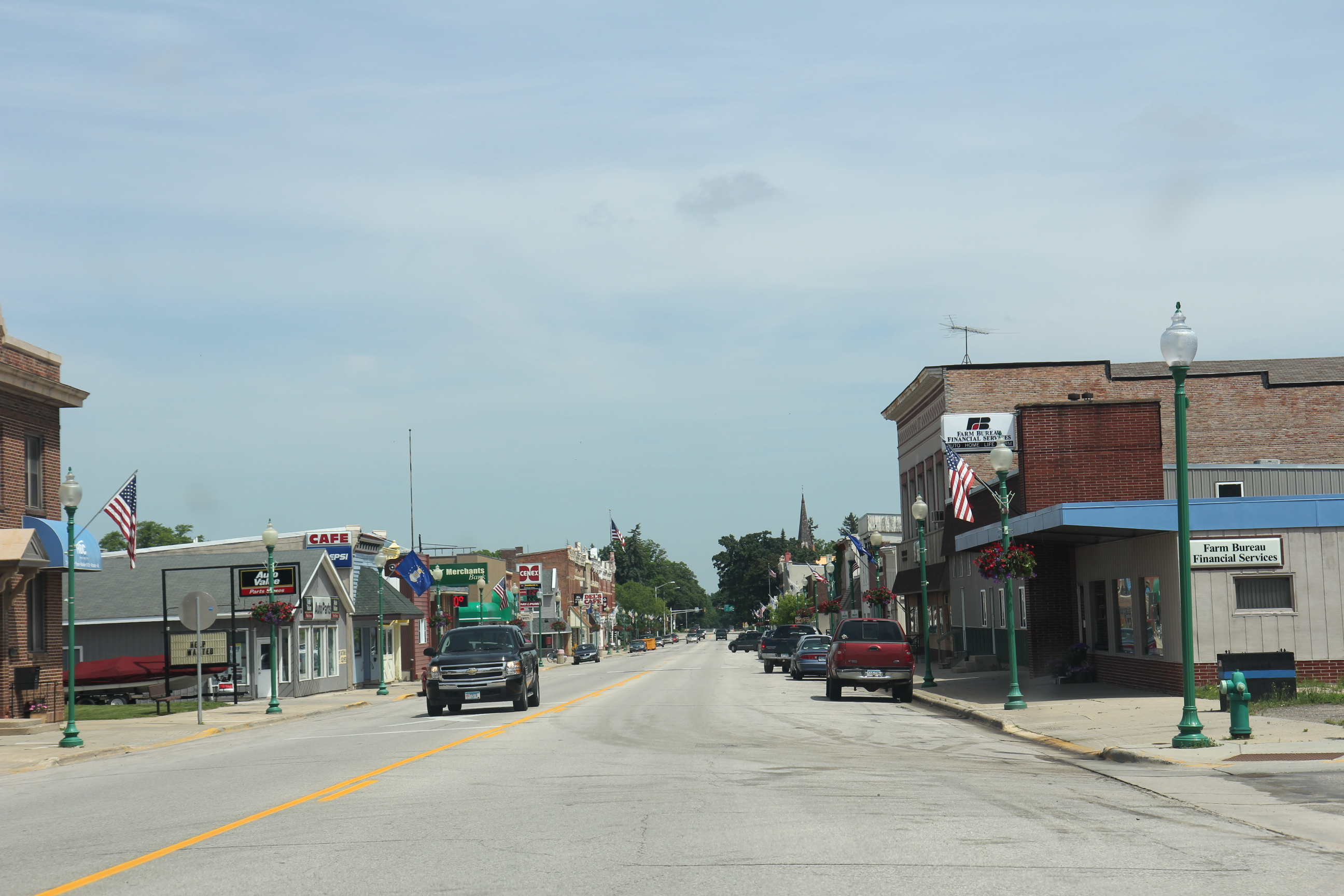
Downtown

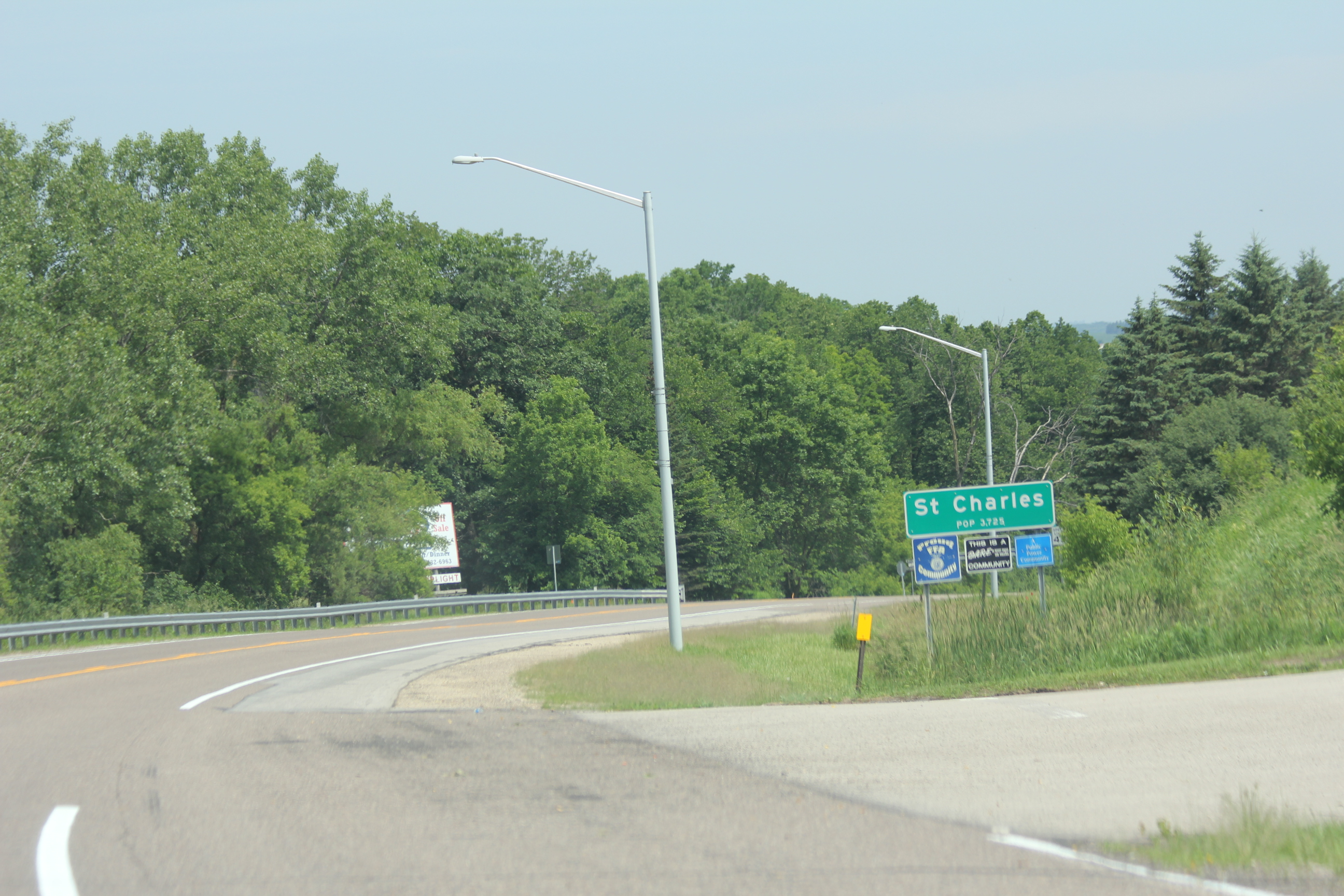
Sign

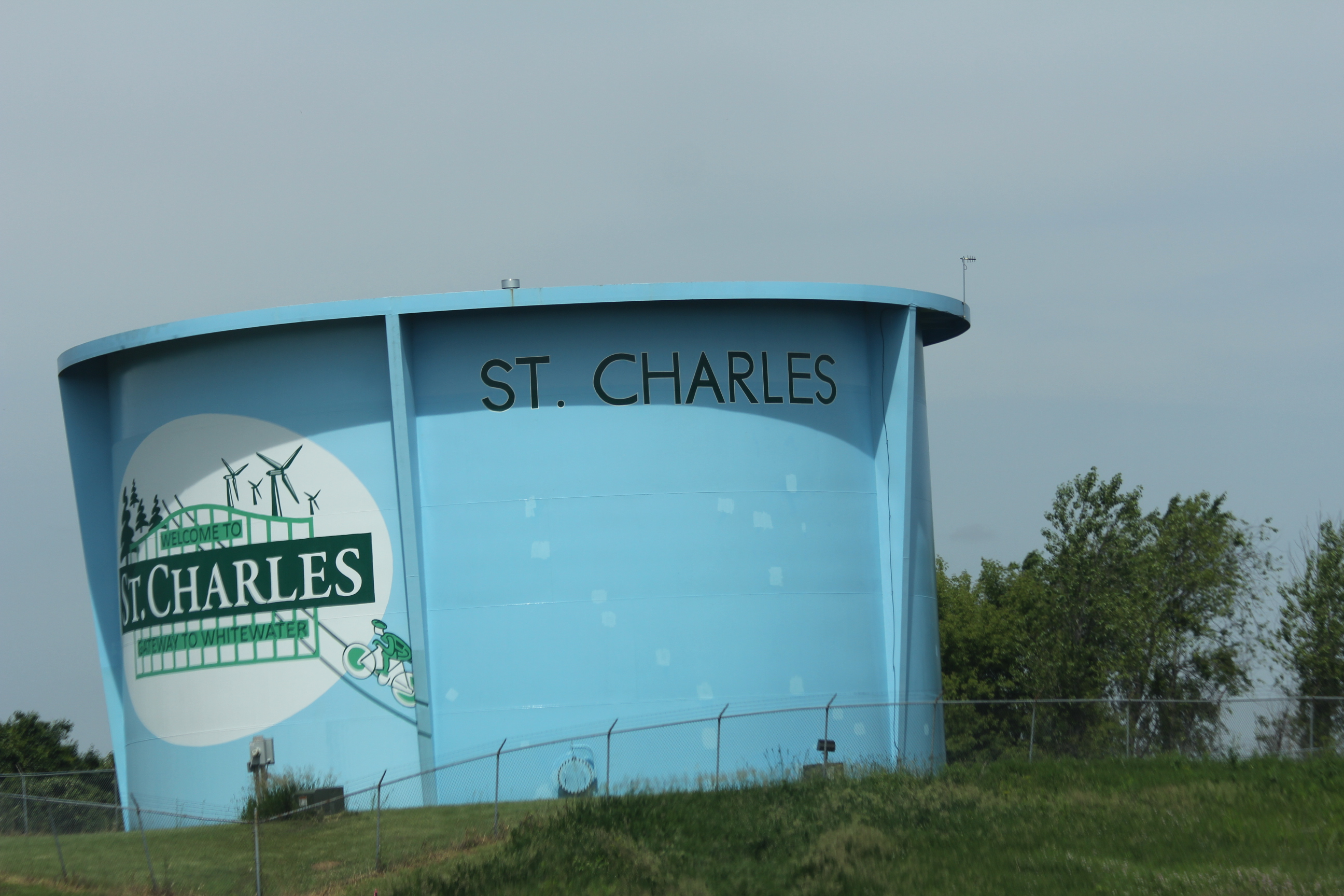
Water tower

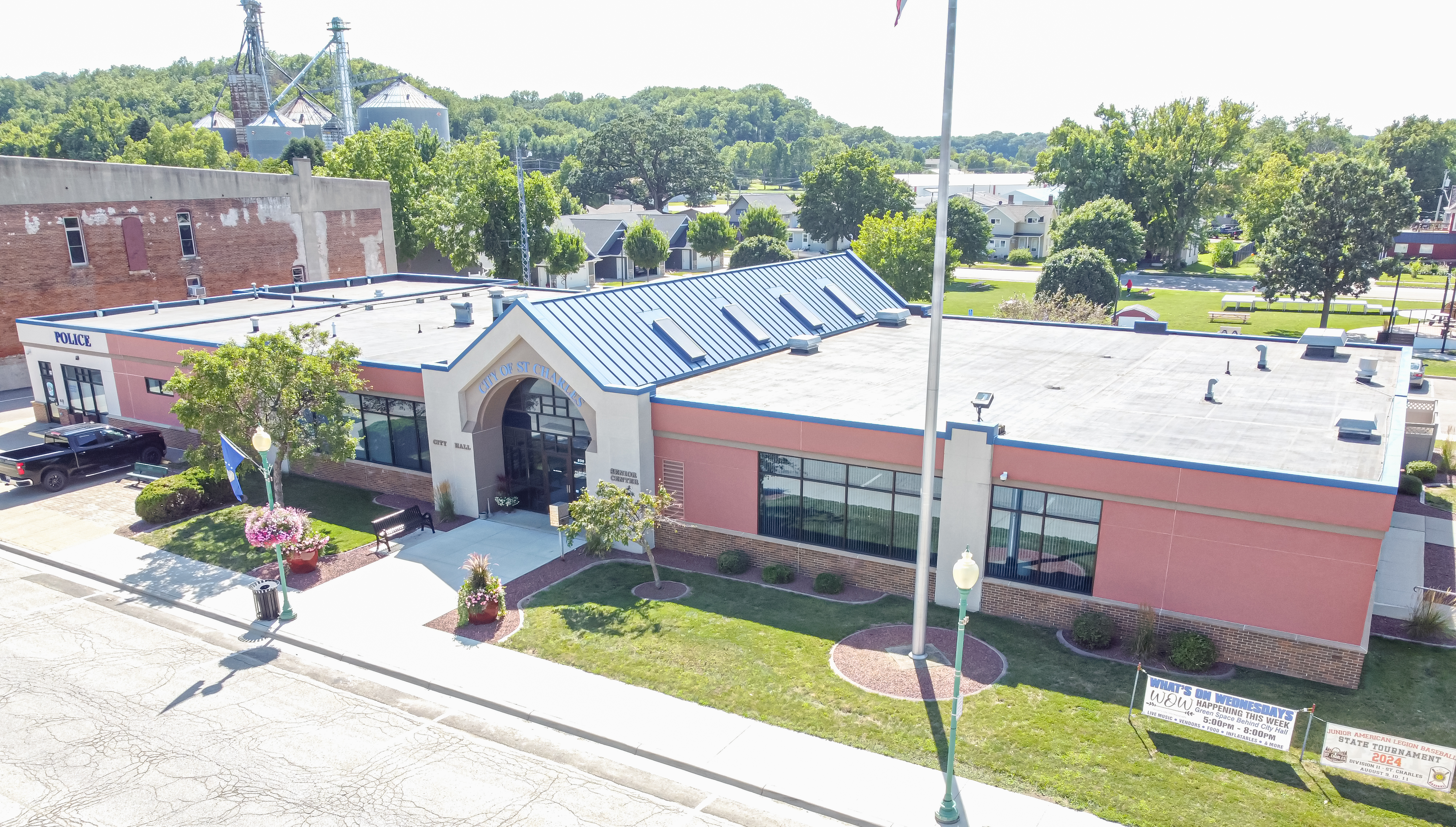
City hall

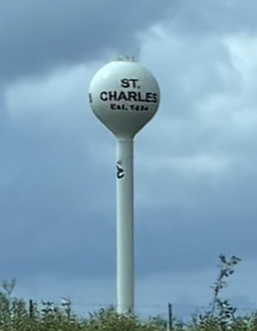
Water tower
