= George W. Kiefer =

American lawyer and politician

George W. Kiefer (October 9, 1891 – July 25, 1943) was an American lawyer and politician.

Kiefer was born in St. Charles, Winona County, Minnesota and graduated from St. Charles High School. He went to the College of St. Thomas and received his law degree from St. Paul College of Law (William Mitchell College of Law). Kiefer served in the United States Army during World War I and was commissioned a second lieutenant. He lived in Lewiston, Minnesota with his wife and family and practiced law. Kiefer served as the postmaster of Lewiston, Minnesota and was the local examining attorney for the United States Federal Land Bank in 1934 and 1935. Kiefer served in the Minnesota House of Representatives from 1937 until his death in 1943.
