= St. Charles High School (Minnesota) =

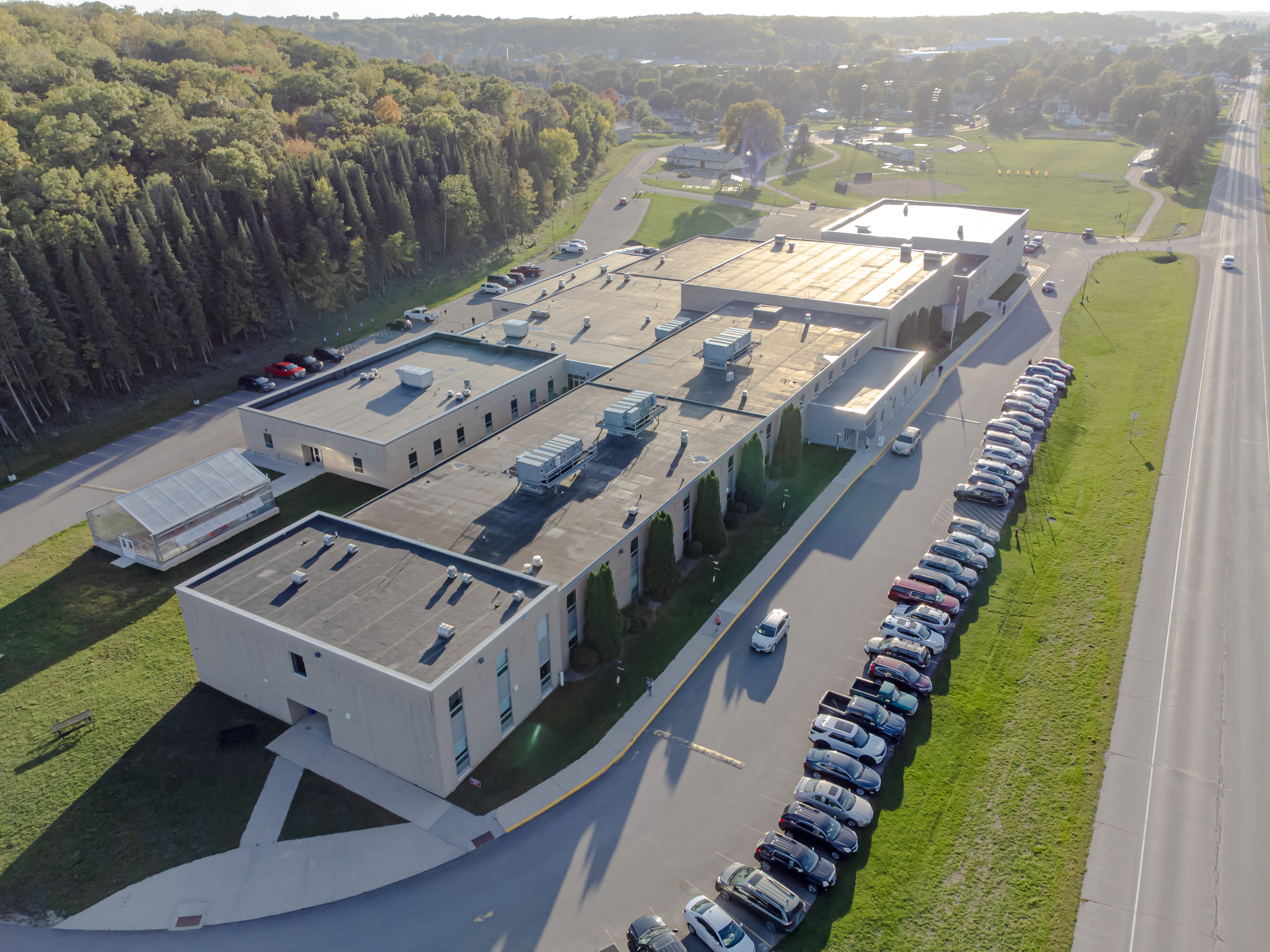

Location
- 600 E 6th Street; St. Charles, Minnesota 55972; United States
- Coordinates: 43°58′17″N 92°3′16″W

Information
- School type: Public, High School
- Established: 1905
- School district: St. Charles Public Schools
- Superintendent: Robert Routh
- School number: ISD No. 858
- Principal: Dustin Pautsch
- Teaching staff: 28.10 (FTE)
- Grades: 7–12
- Student to teacher ratio: 17.05
- Hours in school day: 8
- Color
- Fight song: Minnesota Rouser
- Athletics conference: MSHSL Region 1A; Three Rivers-West
- Sports: football, basketball, cross country, volleyball, soccer, wrestling, baseball, track and field, softball, dance team, hockey (through Winona Senior High School.) and Golf
- Team name: Saints
- Website: www.scschools.net

St. Charles High School is a public four-year high school in St. Charles, Minnesota, United States. Founded in 1905, the school serves over 260 students in grades 9–12. It is in the St. Charles Public Schools district.

In 2017, St. Charles Public Schools spent more than $4 million on a heating system for the school, which had been using a steam heat source since its opening.

== Athletics ==
St. Charles High School offers eight sports for women (cross country, volleyball, soccer, dance team, basketball, softball, track, and golf) and eight for men (cross country, football, soccer, basketball, wrestling, baseball, track, and golf). Students may play hockey through Winona Senior High School.

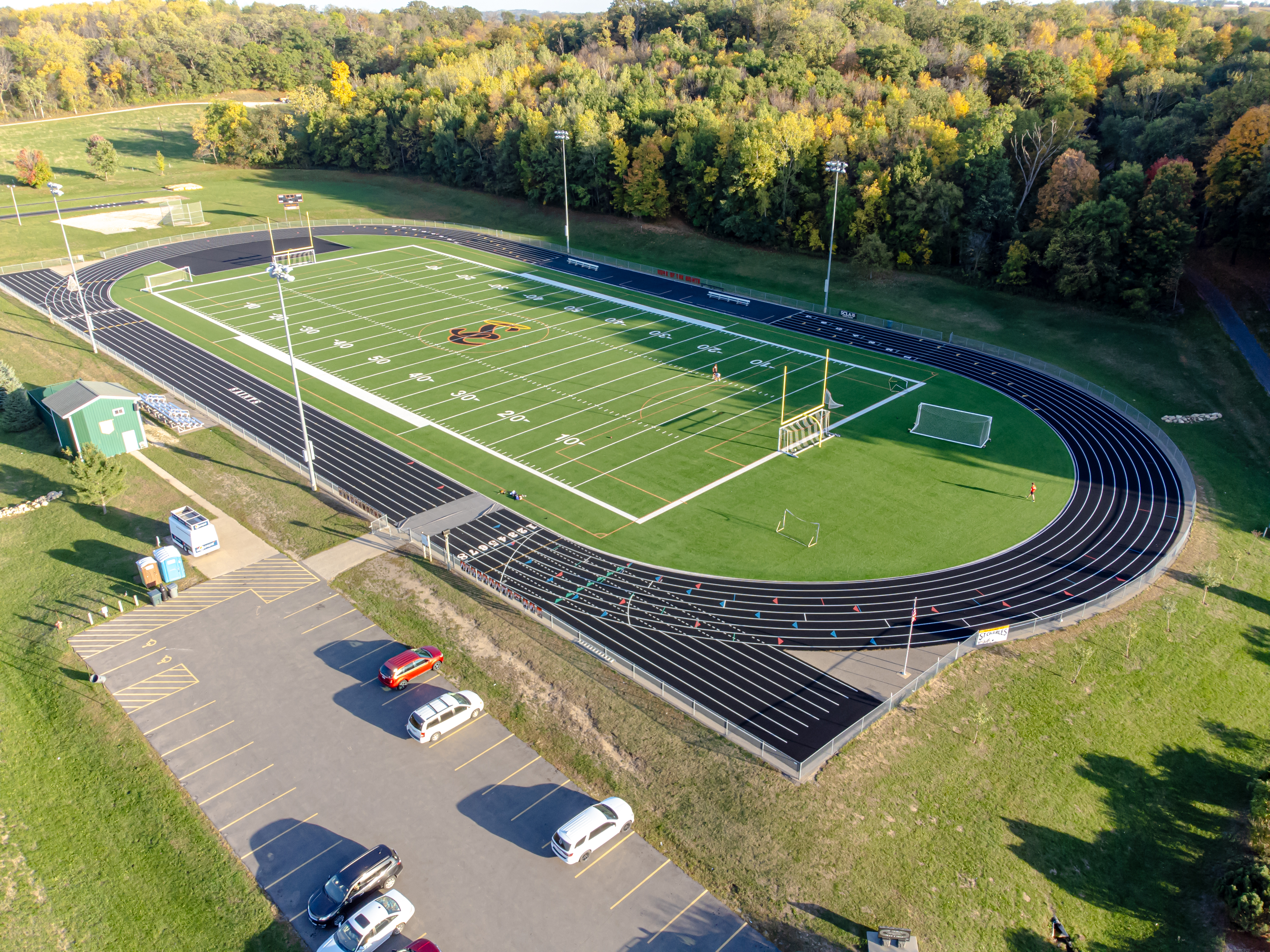
Football field and track

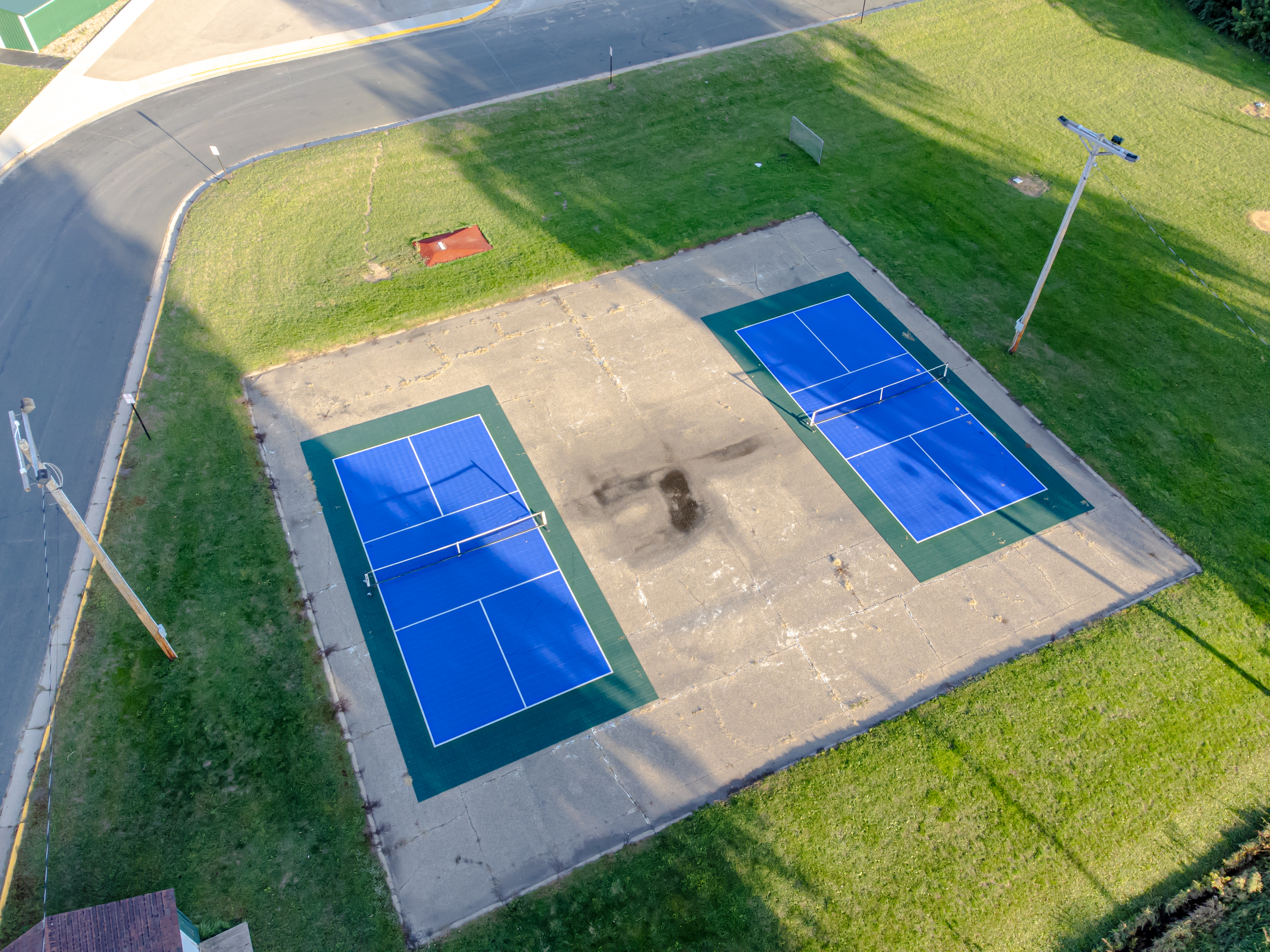
Outdoor pickleball courts

== Notable alumni ==
- Brad Nessler - sportscaster
- Utica Queen - drag queen
