= Carl H. Fischer =

- Born: May 22, 1907
- Died: November 23, 2005 (aged 98)
- Occupation: Floriculturalist
- Known for: Creation of gladioli varieties

Carl H. Fischer (May 22, 1907 – November 23, 2005) was a floriculturalist in the United States known for creating many new varieties of gladiolus flowers. The company he founded in 1945, Noweta Gardens, continues to market some of the 600 hybrids of glads he developed.

St. Charles, Minnesota, the city where he lived for most of his life, holds a Gladiolus Days festival which recognizes him every August.
