= Whitewater Avenue Commercial Historic District =

Historic district in Minnesota, United States

- U.S. National Register of Historic Places
- U.S. Historic district
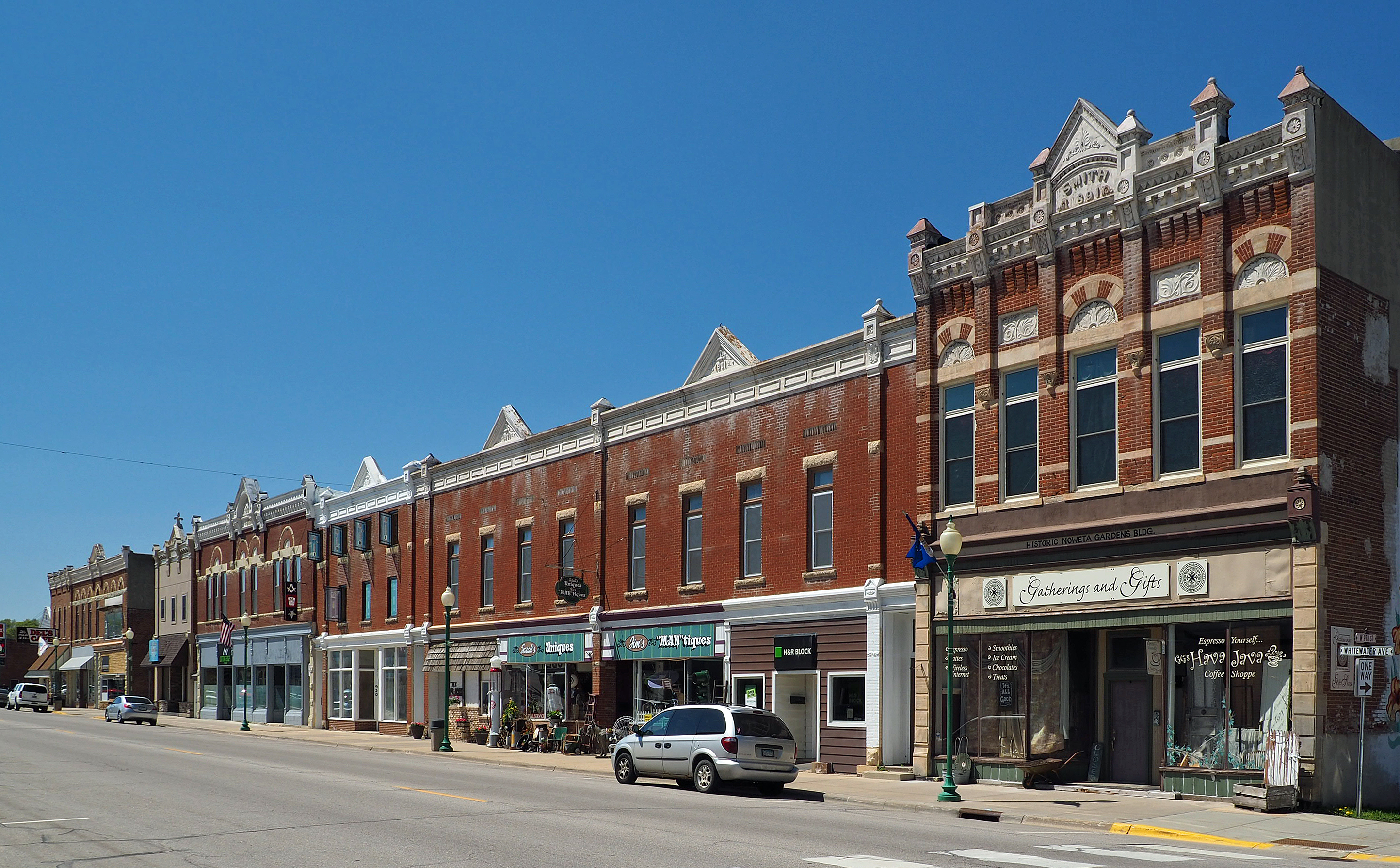
- The Whitewater Avenue Commercial Historic District viewed from the northeast

- Location within Minnesota Location within the United States
- Location: 900–1012 Whitewater Avenue, St. Charles, Minnesota
- Coordinates: 43°58′7″N 92°3′54.5″W
- Area: Less than one acre
- Built: 1890–1901
- NRHP reference No.: 84001736
- Designated HD: August 9, 1984

The Whitewater Avenue Commercial Historic District is a small historic district in St. Charles, Minnesota, United States. It consists of a row of seven buildings stretching one and a half blocks along the west side of Whitewater Avenue. They were built between 1890 and 1901. The district was listed on the National Register of Historic Places in 1984 for having local significance in the theme of architecture. It was nominated for its strong visual cohesion, representing a pinnacle of commercial architecture in St. Charles.

== See also ==
- National Register of Historic Places listings in Winona County, Minnesota
