= St. Charles Public Schools =

School district in Minnesota, United States

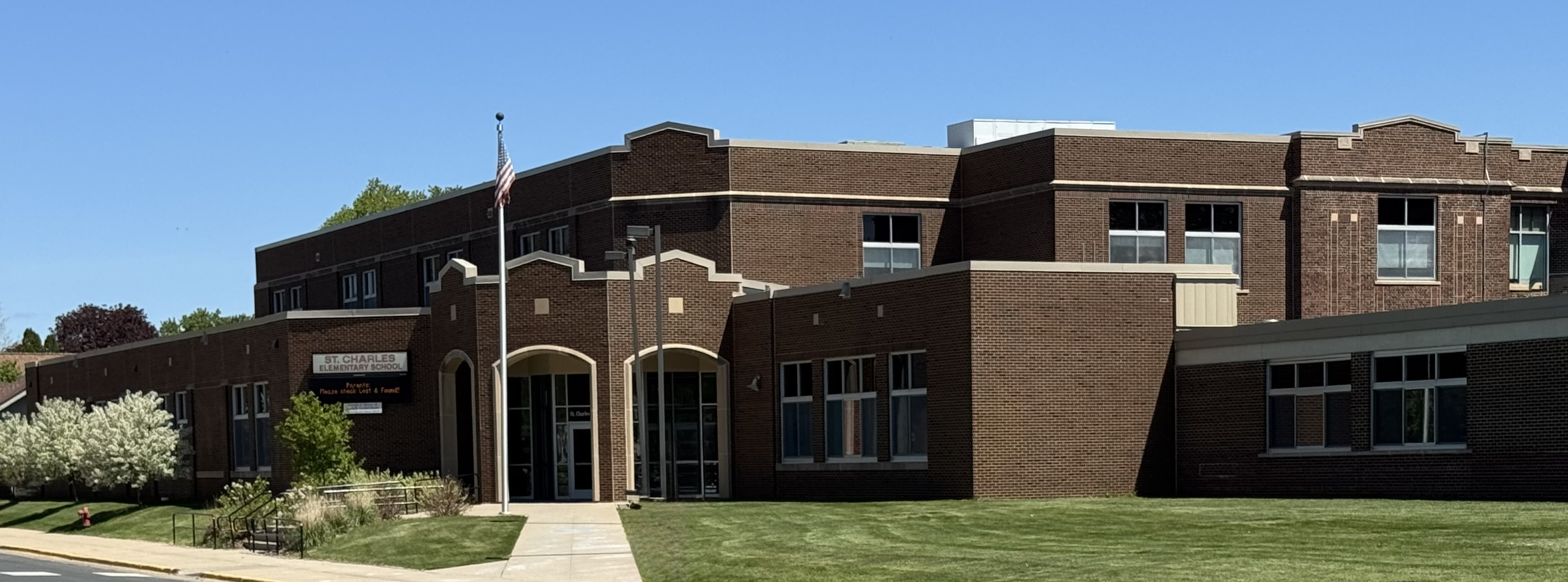
- St. Charles Elementary School

Location
- St. Charles Minnesota; United States

District information
- Schools: 2

Other information
- Website: St. Charles Public Schools

St. Charles Public Schools is a school district headquartered in St. Charles, Minnesota, serving the cities of St. Charles, Elba, Minnesota and Utica, Minnesota.

It operates two schools: St. Charles High School and St. Charles Elementary School.
