= Edward Marion Augustus Chandler =

American chemist

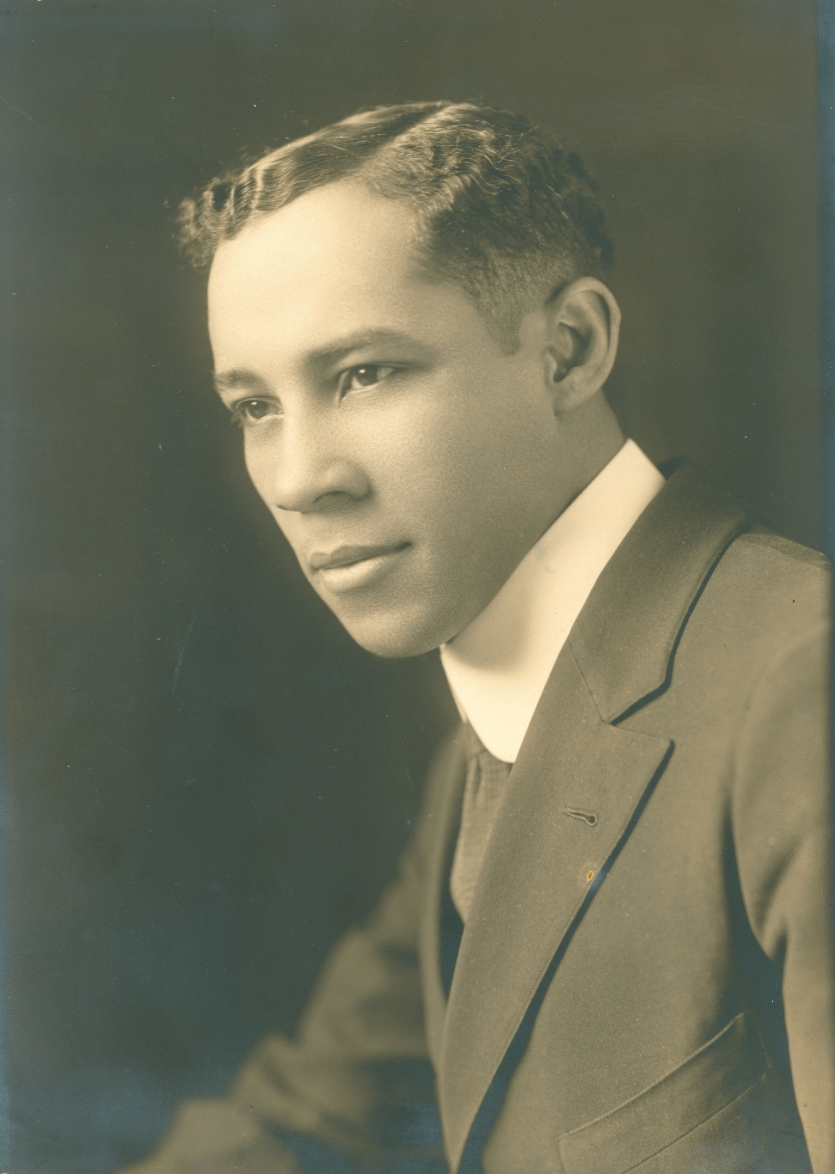
- Born: April 10, 1887; Ocala, Florida
- Died: March 22, 1973 (aged 85); Texas, Houston
- Education: University of Illinois, Ph.D. (1917) Clark University, M.S. (1914) Howard University, A.B. (1913)
- Known for: triphenylmethane dyes
- Spouse: Estella May Thorton
- Children: 3
- Scientific career
- Workplaces: Dicks David & Heller Company (1917 - 1921), Abbott Laboratories (1921 - 1924)
- Thesis: The molecular rearrangement of carbon compounds (1917)
- Doctoral advisor: Roger Adams

Edward Marion Augustus Chandler (April 10, 1887 – March 22, 1973) was the second African American to receive a Ph.D. in chemistry while studying at University of Illinois at Urbana–Champaign and was a founding faculty member at Roosevelt University in Chicago.

== Early life and education ==
Chandler was the first of eight children born to Annie M. (née Onley) (1861–1909) and Henry Wilkins Chandler (1852–1938) in Ocala, Florida. Chandler's mother was a teacher from New York, and Chandler's father was the first Black graduate of Bates College in Maine who was an early African American lawyer, Florida state senator, and Republican Party Delegate.

After completing high school, Chandler attended Teachers' College of Howard University where he received his A.B. in Education in 1913. He then went to Clark University and obtained his M.S. in chemistry in 1914. His master thesis was titled On the dynamics of ester hydrolosis [sic] by acids. He completed his Ph.D. in chemistry in 1917 under the guidance Roger Adams at the University of Illinois which made him the second African American to earn a Ph.D. in chemistry in the United States after St. Elmo Brady. His PhD thesis is titled "The Molecular rearrangement of Carbon Compounds".

== Career ==
After completing his Ph.D., he worked in the dye firm of Dicks, David and Heller Company until 1921. Then he worked at the pharmaceutical manufacturer Abbott Laboratories. In 1924 Chandler left Abbott to become a consulting chemist in Lake County, Illinois.

In 1945 Chandler was among the founding faculty of the new racially integrated Roosevelt College (now Roosevelt University). Other pioneers at the school included sociologist St. Clair Drake, modern dancer Sybil Shearer, and sociologist Rose Hum Lee. Chandler taught there for twenty years.

== Professional memberships ==
- American Chemical Society
- Fellowship in Science
- Phi Lambda Upsilon
- Sigma Xi

== Family ==
He married Arstella May Thorton on September 2, 1915. They had four children together: Dean T. Chandler (1917), Helen Marie Chandler (1920), Ruth Annette Chandler (1922), and Beverly Jane Chandler (1925).

== See also ==
- St. Elmo Brady - first African-American to obtain a PhD in chemistry in US (1916)
- Percy Lavon Julian - third African-American to obtain a PhD in chemistry in US (1931)
- Marie Maynard Daly - first female African-American to obtain a PhD in chemistry in US (1947)
- List of African-American inventors and scientists
