= St. Elmo Brady =

American chemist (1884–1966)

St Elmo Brady
- Born: December 22, 1884; Louisville, Kentucky
- Died: December 26, 1966 (aged 82); Washington, D.C.
- Education: Fisk University (BA); University of Illinois (MS), (PhD)
- Occupations: Chemist; Professor

St. Elmo Brady (December 22, 1884 – December 26, 1966) was an American chemist who was the first African American to obtain a Ph.D. in chemistry in the United States. He received his doctorate at the University of Illinois in 1916.

== Early life and education ==
St. Elmo Brady was born on December 22, 1884, in Louisville, Kentucky. Greatly influenced by Thomas W. Talley, a pioneer in the teaching of science, Brady received his bachelor's degree from Fisk University in 1908 at the age of 24, and immediately began teaching at Tuskegee Institute in Alabama. Brady also had a close relationship with and was mentored by Booker T. Washington and George Washington Carver. In 1912, after his time at Tuskegee University, he was offered a scholarship to the University of Illinois to engage in graduate studies. St Elmo Brady was a member of the Alpha Phi Alpha fraternity.

Brady published three scholarly abstracts in Science in 1914–15 on his work with Professor Clarence Derick. He also collaborated with Professor George Beal on a paper published in Journal of Industrial and Engineering Chemistry titled, "The Hydrochloride Method for the Determination of Alkaloids". Professor Brady also authored monographs entitled Household Chemistry for Girls (1916) and Elements of Metallurgy for Dental Students (1924).

Brady completed a M.S. in chemistry in 1914 and carried out his Ph.D. thesis work at Noyes Laboratory under the direction of Derick, writing a dissertation in 1916 titled "The Divalent Oxygen Atom".

Many years later, he told his students that when he went to graduate school, "they began with 20 whites and one other, and ended in 1916 with six whites and one other."

== Legacy ==
Brady was the first African American to receive a Ph.D. in chemistry in the United States, which he received from the University of Illinois in 1916.

During his time at Illinois, Brady became the first African American admitted to the university's chemical honor society, Phi Lambda Upsilon (1914), and he was one of the first African Americans to be inducted into Sigma Xi, the science honorary society (1915).

In November 1916, The Crisis—monthly magazine of the NAACP—selected Brady for its biographical sketch as "Man of the Month".

After completing his graduate studies, Brady taught at Tuskegee University from 1916 to 1920. Brady accepted a teaching position at Howard University in Washington, D.C., in 1920 and eventually became the Chair of Howard University's Chemistry Department. In 1927 he moved to Fisk University to chair the school's Chemistry department. He remained at Fisk for 25 years until his retirement in 1952. While serving as the chair for the Chemistry department at Fisk University, Brady founded the first ever graduate studies program at a black college or university. After his retirement from Fisk, he taught at Tougaloo College in Jackson, Mississippi.

The research Brady carried out at Fisk resulted in several publications, including a 1938 paper in the Journal of the American Pharmaceutical Society on the phytochemicals in the seed of the magnolia, and a 1939 paper in the Journal of the American Chemical Society on the reactions of ricinoleic acid. In 1952, Brady published a paper with Samuel P. Massie on the preparation of 1,1-dichloroheptane.

Brady's principal legacy was his establishment of strong undergraduate curricula, graduate programs, and fundraising development for four historically black colleges and universities. In conjunction with faculty from the University of Illinois, he established a summer program in infrared spectroscopy, which was open to faculty from all colleges and universities.

Talley-Brady Hall on the Fisk campus is named for Brady and another Fisk alumnus, Thomas Talley.

== Personal life ==
Brady married Myrtle Travers and they had two sons, Robert and St. Elmo Brady Jr. who worked as a physician.

== See also ==
- Edward Bouchet (1852–1918), first African American to earn a Ph.D. from any American university (in physics at Yale in 1876)
- Edward Marion Augustus Chandler (1887–1973), second African American to obtain a PhD in chemistry (1917)
- Percy Lavon Julian (1899–1975), third African American to obtain a PhD in chemistry (1931)
- Marie Maynard Daly (1921–2003), first female African American to obtain a PhD in chemistry (1947)
