= Browniekar =

Defunct American motor vehicle manufacturer

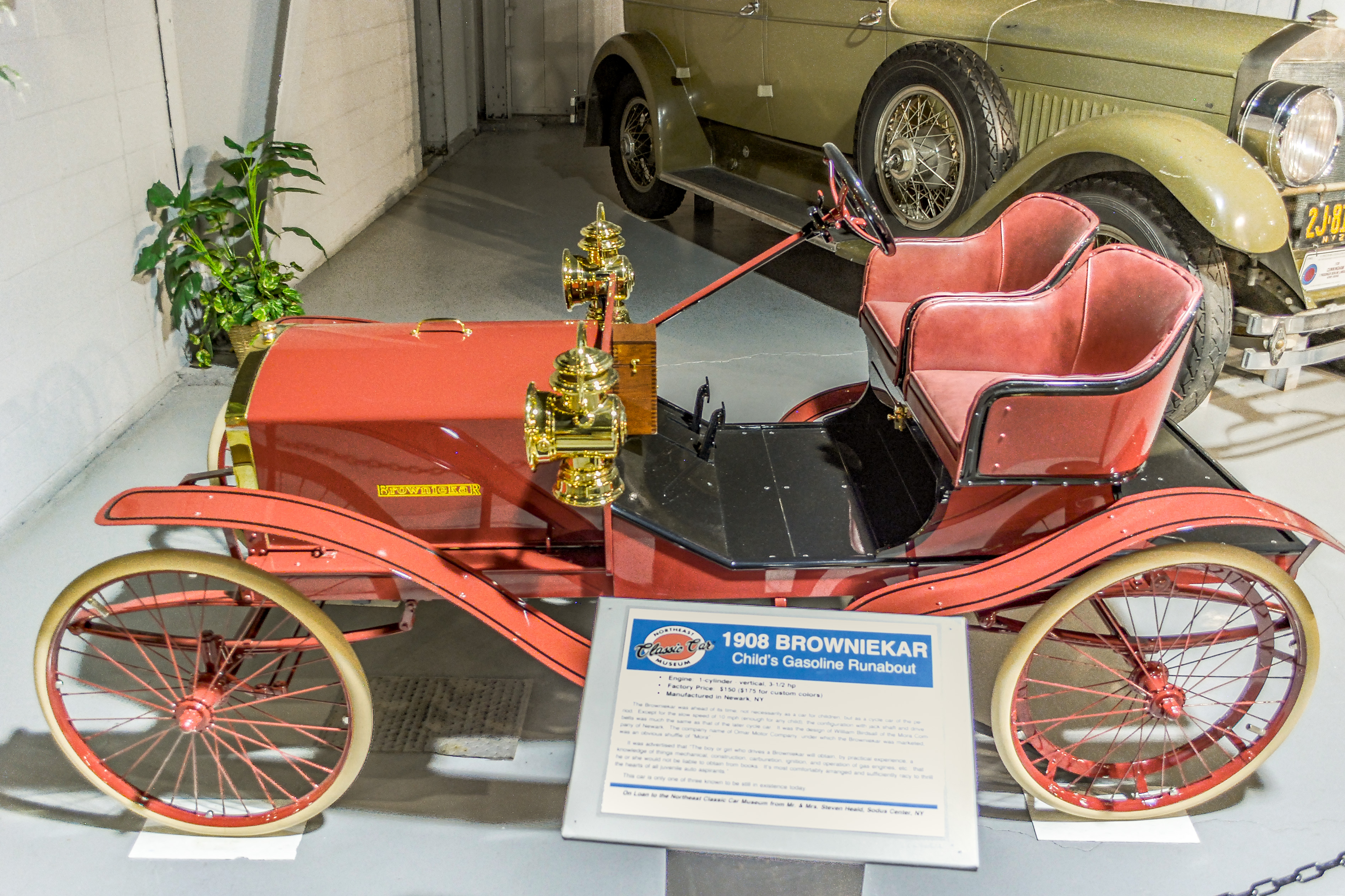
A 1908 "Browniekar" cycle-car on exhibit at the Northeast Classic Car Museum, 24 Rexford St., Norwich, NY, 13615

Browniekar was the name of a brass era cycle car built in Newark, New York, from 1908 to 1911.

This roadster that placed two passengers fulfilled two purposes: It was a "toy designed for "harmless sport and amusement of the young folks", and, nevertheless, a real and usable car., hence the name of the company that built it: Child's Automobile Company. It rode on a wheelbase of 66 inches and had a single-cylinder 4-stroke engine that delivered 3½ hp. Price was just $150.00.

The Browniekar was developed by William H. Birdsall, the engineer of the Mora four- and six-cylinder automobiles built in Newark, too, from 1906 to 1910.

When Birdsall found out that the company's name was not appropriate for a manufacturer, it was changed to Omar Motor Car Company - Omar being an anagram for Mora.
