= Sybil Shearer =

Choreographer, modern dancer and writer

- Born: February 23, 1912; Toronto, Ontario, Canada
- Died: November 17, 2005 (aged 93); Evanston, Illinois, U.S.
- Occupations: Choreographer; dancer; writer

Sybil Louise Shearer (February 23, 1912 – November 17, 2005) was an American choreographer, dancer, and writer. She was hailed as a "maverick" or "nature mystic" of modern dance.

== Early life and education ==
Sybil Shearer was born in Toronto, Canada in 1912, the daughter of Constance Augusta and John Porter Shearer, a commercial artist and inventor. The family moved from Nyack to Newark, New York in 1924 as Shearer's father got a job working for Bloomer Brothers. After graduating from Washington High School in Newark in 1930, she studied at Skidmore College in Saratoga Springs, graduating in 1934. She then pursued modern dance at Bennington College's summer workshops in Vermont, with Doris Humphrey, Martha Graham and Hanya Holm.

== Career ==
Shearer was drawn to dance after seeing Russian ballerina Anna Pavlova. She spent a summer at Bennington College when it was a modern dance mecca, and then put in seven years of study and work in New York City with the likes of Doris Humphrey and Agnes de Mille. Shearer's first solo concert in Manhattan in 1941 at Carnegie Hall, caused a sensation. Shortly after her New York City triumph, she walked away from the fame that was opening for her, settling instead in the American Midwest in the mid-1940s. She became a professor at the integrated school Roosevelt College (now Roosevelt University) along several other pioneers including sociologist St. Clair Drake, chemist Edward Marion Augustus Chandler, and sociologist Rose Hum Lee. She continued to perform in the Chicago area, and inspired numerous students of dance, including John Neumeier who became director of the Hamburg Ballet.

In Chicago, Shearer hooked up with photographer Helen Balfour Morrison, with whom she would spend most of the rest of her life. An established celebrity-portrait photographer (Frank Lloyd Wright, Thornton Wilder, Bertrand Russell), Morrison became Shearer's lighting director, business manager, and adoptive mother. She took care of Shearer's worldly needs and obsessively captured her on film, creating the drop-dead images that helped build a dancing legend. In 1951 Shearer left Roosevelt and moved into a home and studio built for her on what was, in effect, the side yard of the Northbrook home Morrison shared with her husband.

Margaret Lloyd said of Sybil in her book "The Borzoi Book of Modern Dance", "Sybil Shearer is a perfectionist who likes to believe that perfection is humanly attainable." Shearer was among the first performers to tackle spiritual and social justice issues, such as the plight of factory workers, a theme of one of her pieces. She drew ideas and inspiration from a variety of artistic influences, including lengthy correspondence with choreographer and dancer Agnes de Mille and writer Virginia Woolf. In turn, as early as 1949, she influenced the American visual artist Ray Johnson, who dedicated a series of collages to her.

=== Works ===
Shearer depicted both spiritual visions and human foible in her works, which were predominantly solo concerts. She created "In a Vacuum" in 1941 and "Let the Heavens Open That the Earth May Shine" in 1947. She created "Once Upon a Time" in 1951 which was a suite of solos for fantastically named characters. Shearer choreographed group works, among them "Fables and Proverbs" (1961) and "The Reflection in the Puddle Is Mine" (1963).

Shearer's posthumous autobiography, "Without Wings the Way Is Steep" (a title taken from one of her dances) was released in 2006. It was drawn from handwritten copies she kept of nearly every letter she ever sent, together with criticism she wrote in her later years and Morrison's work, including a collection of films in which Shearer performs her own dances in front of a stationary camera in herlittle Northbrook studio. These documents help explain why this idiosyncratic loner - whose career largely consisted of sporadic performances in Midwestern college auditoriums, who never really got the hang of choreographing for others (or dancing with anyone else), and who had no identifiable dance vocabulary that could be passed on to succeeding generations - is considered a giant in her field.

=== Style ===
In a photo book by John Martin, Shearer is often seen wearing loose-fitting garments or highly theatrical costumes. Combining the technique of ballet and the freedom of modern dance, Shearer used a pointed or flexed foot, long extended limbs, and contorted shapes or straight lines of the body.

=== Collaboration ===
Many of Shearer's productions were in collaboration with Helen Balfour Morrison, a photographer and filmmaker who documented Shearer's career.

=== Accomplishments ===
Shearer was appointed artist-in-residence at the Arnold Theatre of the National College of Education (now National Louis University) located in Evanston, Illinois, in 1962. The school was looking to have an artist of great caliber working close by.

As artist-in-residence, Shearer was given the freedom to create works with her company, derived from her repertory, whenever and however she pleased. Her only obligation was to produce one piece that would be performed at the institute's annual assembly. John Martin of The New York Times wrote that Shearer's appointment was the start of alliances formed between established artists and educational institutions.

== The Morrison-Shearer Foundation ==
The Morrison-Shearer Foundation, established in 1991 and based at her home in Northbrook, Illinois, preserves the works related to the careers of photographer Helen Balfour Morrison and Shearer. The Morrison-Shearer Foundation, which Shearer endowed after Morrison's death in 1984, maintains the Jens Jensen-landscaped Northbrook property and its buildings as an artists' retreat and archive.

== Later life and death ==
Shearer made her last stage appearance at the age of 93, dancing her solo work Flame at the Art Institute of Chicago in February 2005. Later that year, she suffered a stroke, dying at Evanston Hospital on November 17, 2005.

== Literary treatment ==
Shearer was celebrated by the poet Gary Forrester in "The Beautiful Daughters of Men"

== Bibliography ==
- ”Creative Dance" Oct. 1,1943
- "Without Wings the Way Is Steep" The Autobiography of Sybil Shearer, Vol. 1, Within This Thicket (2006)
- "Without Wings the Way Is Steep" The Autobiography of Sybil Shearer, Volume II: The Midwest Inheritance (2012)

== See also ==
- List of autobiographers
- List of dancers
- List of choreographers
- List of people from New York
- Helen Balfour Morrison

== Notes ==
- Mauro, Lucia, "Swan Song" (March 2006) Chicago (magazine).
- Modern And Postmodern Dance Encyclopedia of Chicago accessed March 11, 2017.
