= The Church of Jesus Christ of Latter-day Saints in the Netherlands =

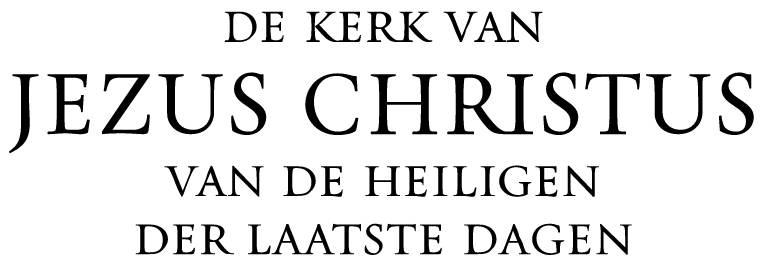
- (Logo in Dutch)

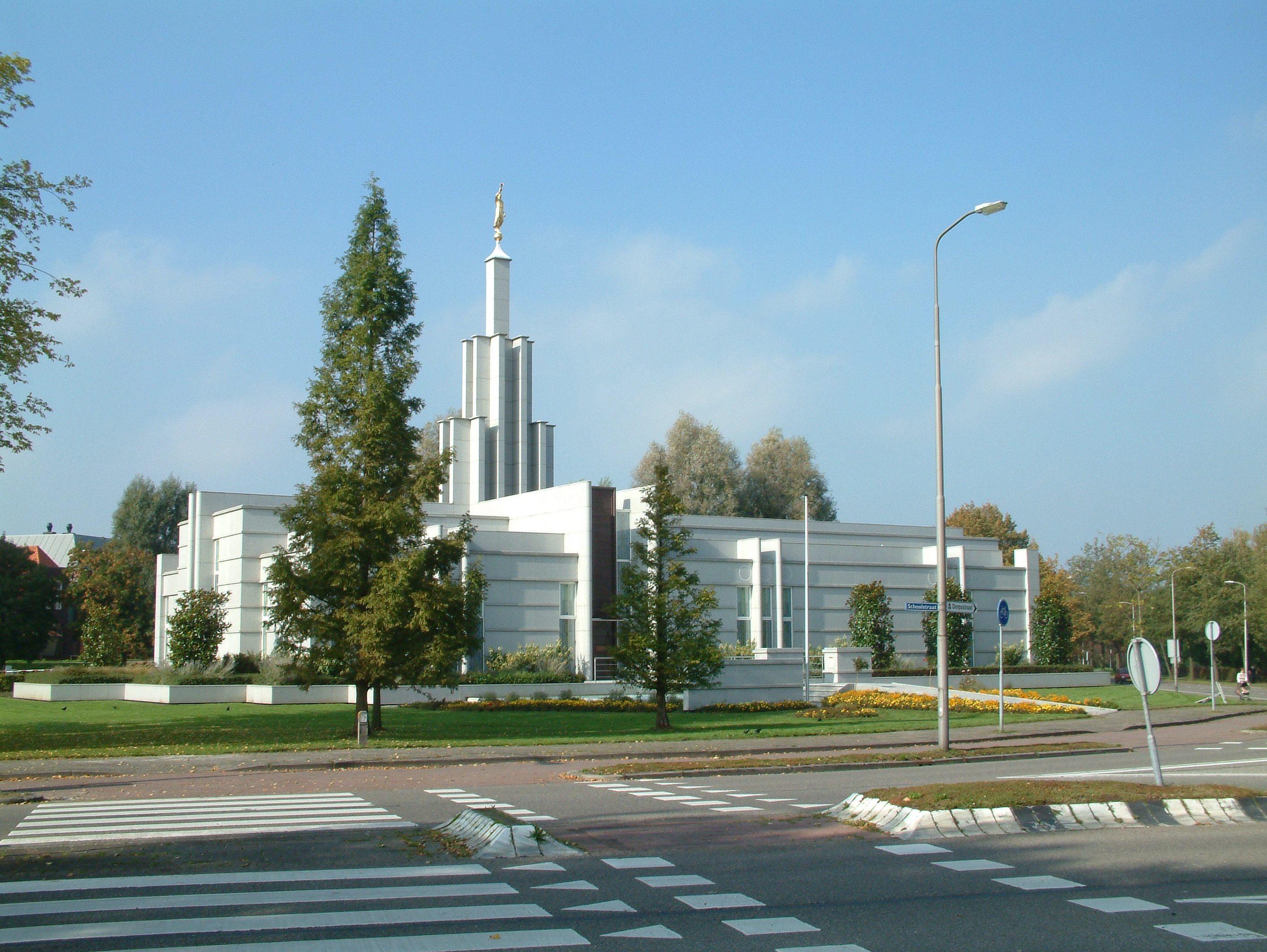
- The Hague Netherlands Temple
- Area: Europe Central
- Members: 9,027 (2025)
- Stakes: 3
- Wards: 19
- Branches: 5
- Total Congregations: 24
- Missions: 1
- Temples: 1 operating
- FamilySearch Centers: 10

The Church of Jesus Christ of Latter-day Saints was first brought to the Netherlands in 1841, with the first congregation officially established in 1862 in Amsterdam. A mission to the Netherlands was organized in 1864, and the Dutch translation of the Book of Mormon was published in 1890. Membership grew in the 20th century despite challenges posed by World War I, the Great Depression, and the German invasion of the Netherlands during World War II; approximately 14,000 people were baptized into the Church during its first 100 years in the Netherlands. The Dutch government officially recognized the Church in 1955. The Netherlands Stake of the Church of Jesus Christ of Latter-day Saints was established in 1961, becoming the first stake established on the European continent. The Hague Netherlands Temple was completed in 2002.

== History ==
Membership in the Netherlands
Year	Membership
1930	3,528
1940	2,832
1950	3,408
1960	3,810
1970	6,797
1979	8,168
1989*	6,800
1999	7,627
2009	8,709
2019	9,326
2025	9,027
*Membership was published as an estimate.

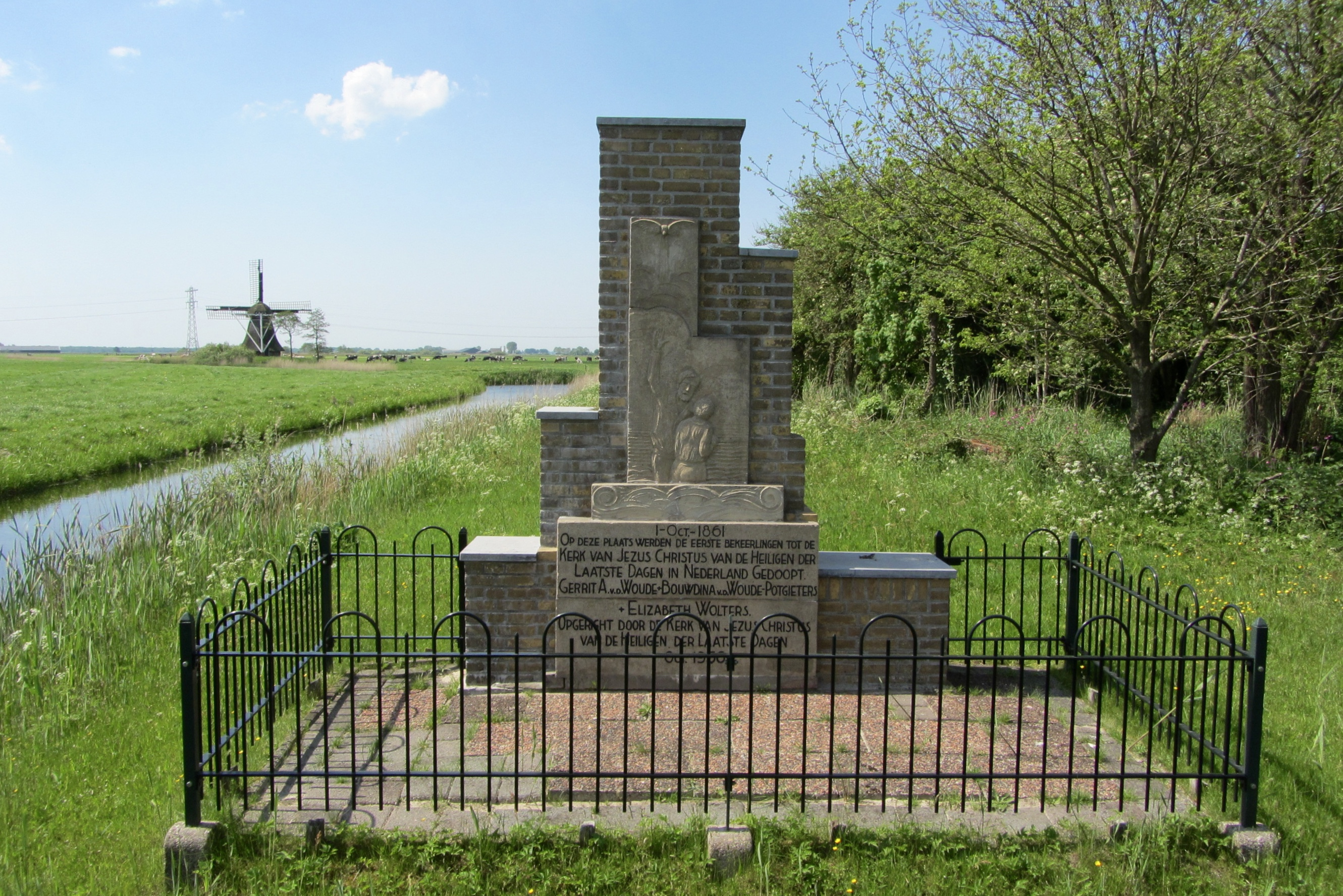
Monument in memory of the first LDS Church converts baptized in the Netherlands in Broeksterwâld

=== 1841-1891: Early beginnings ===
The Church was introduced in the Netherlands as early as June 1841, when Orson Hyde visited Rotterdam and Amsterdam on his way to Jerusalem. While in the country, he discussed Church doctrine with rabbis and printed five hundred Dutch-language copies of An Address to the Hebrews, a pamphlet written by Hyde and intended for the Jews. The impact of the pamphlet is unknown; official missionary work in the Netherlands began two decades later.

Anne van der Woude was the first convert to the Church of Jesus Christ of Latter-day Saints of Dutch origin. He was baptized in 1852 in Cardiff, Wales and later became one of the first missionaries to the Netherlands. Van der Woude and Paul A. Schettler began proselyting in the country in 1861, and the first LDS baptisms on Dutch soil occurred on October 1, 1861 in Friesland. Schettler recorded difficulty in obtaining new converts due to "slandering reports in Dutch and German newspapers" regarding the Church. Once membership reached 15, the first branch of the Church in the Netherlands was established on May 10, 1862 in Amsterdam. Schettler translated sections of the Book of Mormon into Dutch, which were read at Church meetings. By 1863, missionaries and converts reached beyond Amsterdam to cities such as Gorinchem, Werkendam, Rotterdam, and Heukelom, and membership expanded to 33. From 1861 to 1864, the nation was a part of the mission that encompassed Switzerland, Italy, and Germany. The Netherlands Mission of the Church of Jesus Christ of Latter-day Saints was organized in 1864, and the first Dutch LDS emigrants to the U.S. left the Netherlands on June 1, 1864 to travel to Utah. By 1865, there were three branches of the Church in Amsterdam, Gorinchem, and Rotterdam. Seeking to combat abundant anti-Mormon publications, missionaries in 1866 printed two tracts outlining Church doctrine.

Growth decelerated into the 1870s due to hostility from Dutch mobs and newspapers, as well as the limited amount of Church materials translated into Dutch. In 1877, 114 members were recorded. The LDS hymnal in Dutch was released in 1884, and the Dutch translation of the Book of Mormon was finalized in 1890. A copy was sent to Queen Emma. Its publication resulted in a "productive proselyting period" in the Netherlands. In 1891, the Netherlands Mission grew to include Belgium. An official Netherlands Mission publication, De Ster, was first produced in 1896.

=== The 20th century ===
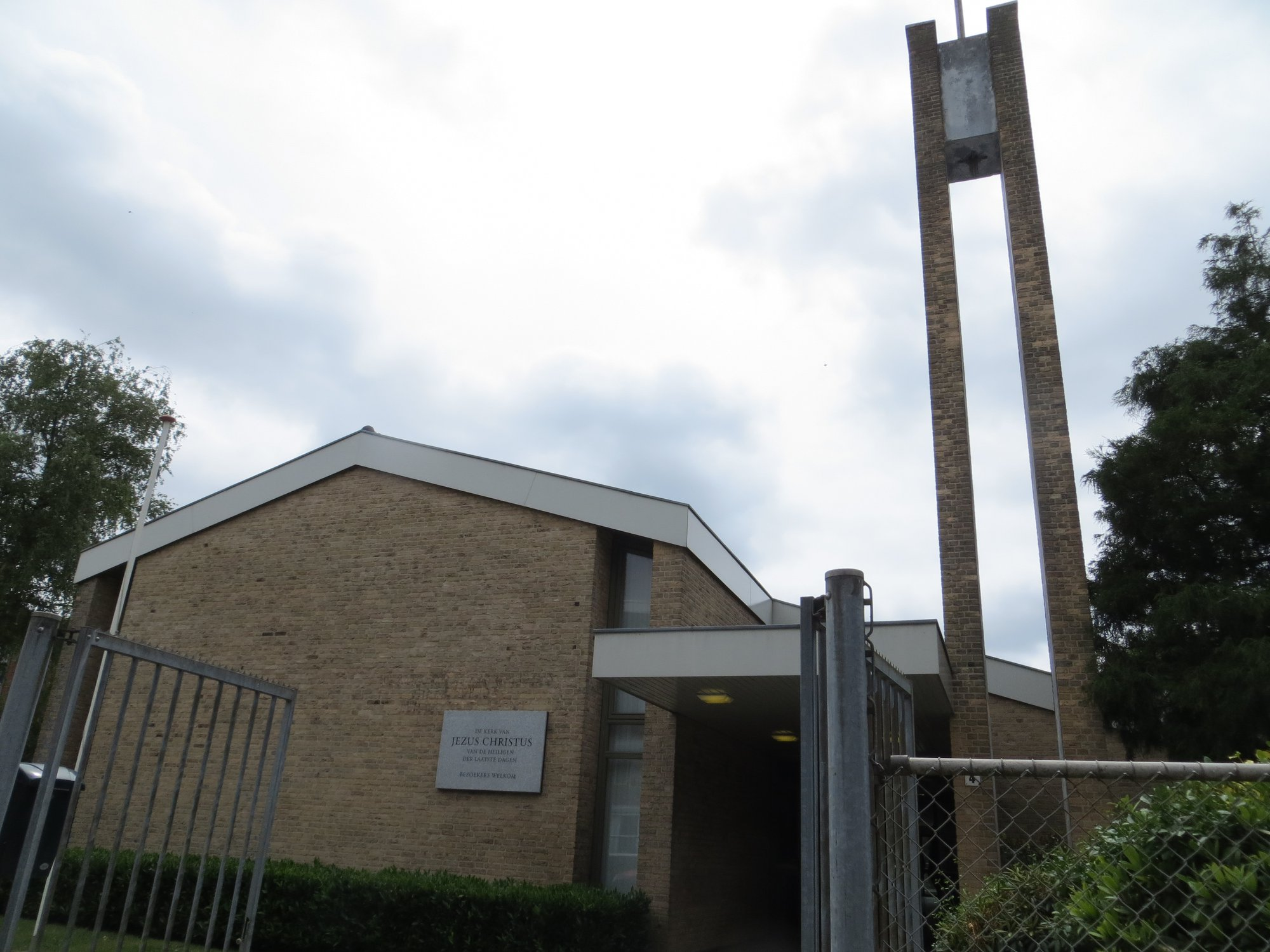
An LDS chapel in Arnhem, Netherlands

At the turn of the century, tension between the Church and the Dutch press began to decrease. In 1902, the Deseret Evening News published a positive report on the Church's presence in the Netherlands, claiming 500 members in Amsterdam. Members of the Church were encouraged not to emigrate, but to stay in the Netherlands and help the Church grow. 2,829 people joined the Church between 1901 and 1914.

At the onset of World War I, the number of missionaries serving in the Netherlands was decreased to just nine. LeGrand Richards was the mission president at the time. The efforts of native Dutch members resulted in 579 people joining the Church during WWI. In the 1920s, membership rose with the addition of 1,712 new converts. The Great Depression and World War II then caused another decline in the Church's expansion. American missionaries were sent home in 1939. The Church had built its first chapel in the Netherlands in 1938, but it was destroyed two years later when the Nazi Air Force bombed Rotterdam. The Nazi army invaded the Netherlands in 1940 and tried to seize the property of the Netherlands Mission, claiming it was "American owned and therefore legitimate war booty," but the mission president was able to convince them that the mission was indeed Dutch. The occupation prevented Church members from meeting together until 1941. After WWII ended, the Dutch government barred the re-entrance of American missionaries on the grounds that the nation's struggle with food shortage prevented the acceptance of any additional mouths to feed. They were allowed back in the Netherlands in 1946. Ezra Taft Benson visited the nation that year as well, surveying damaged Church property and meeting with local leaders. The Church donated food and clothing to the Netherlands Red Cross during this time. In 1947 and 1948, members of the Church in the Netherlands donated potatoes and herring to their counterparts in Germany. This effort was later named "The Dutch Potato Project."

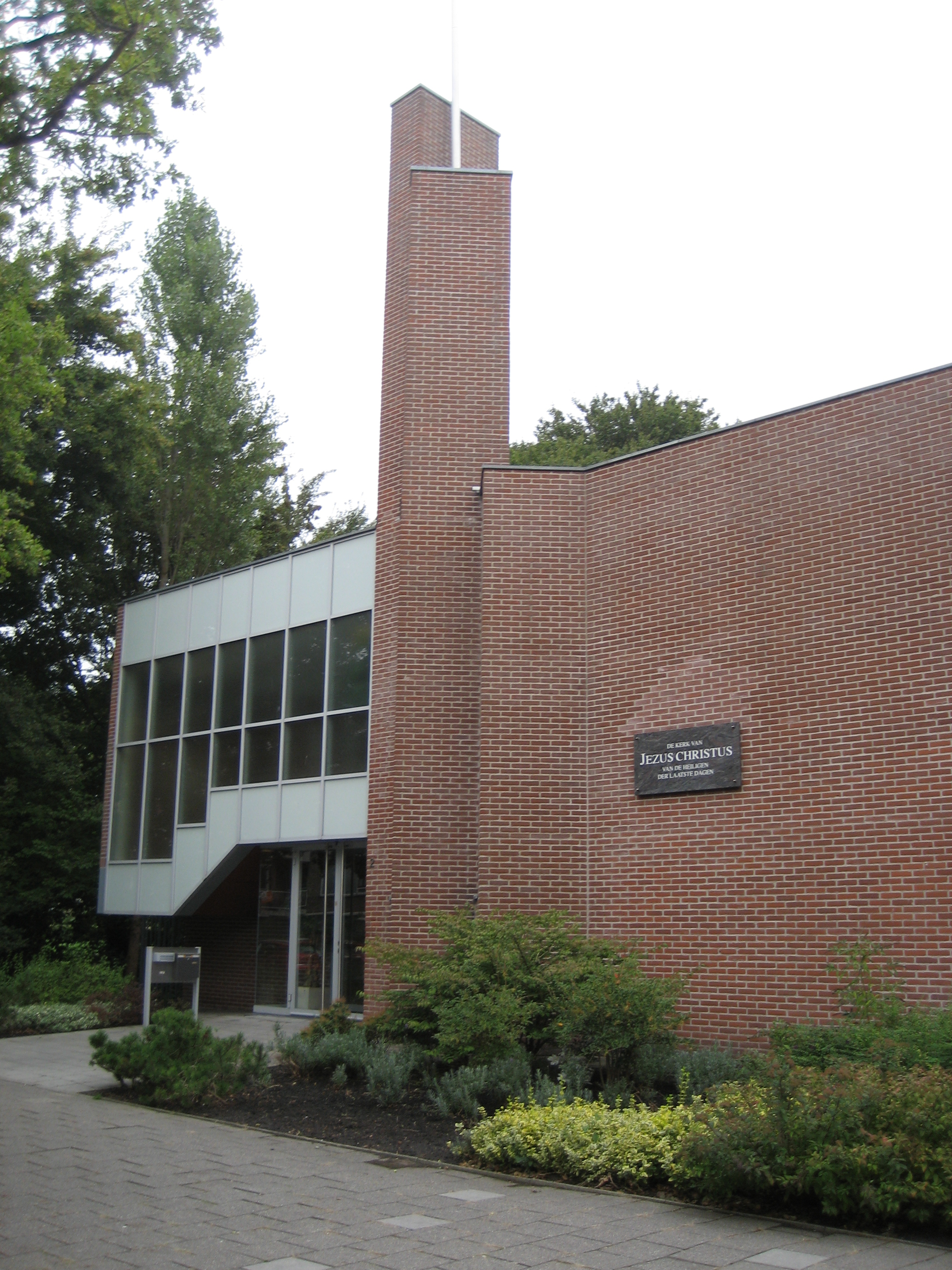
An LDS chapel in Leiden

In May 1952, David O. McKay, then President of the Church, visited Queen Juliana of the Netherlands in Soestdijk Palace. He later mailed her a copy of the Book of Mormon. The Church of Jesus Christ of Latter-day Saints was officially recognized by the Dutch government on August 22, 1955. That same year, the Tabernacle Choir visited the Netherlands, performing via AVRO and in the Kurhaus of Scheveningen concert hall. The first stake of the Church in the Netherlands was organized on March 12, 1961 by Hugh B. Brown. It was both the first in continental Europe and the first non-English-speaking stake. The first general authority of the Church from the Netherlands, Jacob de Jager, was called to the First Quorum of the Seventy in 1976. About 14,000 Netherlanders joined the Church within its first century in the nation. In the 1980s and 90s, more and more immigrants and refugees, particularly from Africa, began to constitute baptisms performed in the Netherlands.

=== 2002-present: Recent developments ===
In 2002, The Netherlands Amsterdam Mission and the Belgium Brussels Mission were combined into the Belgium Brussels/Netherlands Mission of the Church of Jesus Christ of Latter-day Saints. That same year, The Hague Netherlands Temple was completed, and membership was recorded as 7,899. On September 24, 2011, a celebration commemorating the first baptisms in the Netherlands was held at the site where they occurred: a canal between Broeksterwâld and Damwâld, Friesland. The Tabernacle Choir at Temple Square concluded its tour of Europe in 2016 at the De Doelen concert hall in Rotterdam. In 2017, nine million documents from the Netherlands were uploaded to FamilySearch. Ronald A. Rasband of the Quorum of the Twelve Apostles visited the Netherlands in April 2018.

In 2020, the LDS Church temporarily canceled services and other public gatherings in response to the spread of the coronavirus pandemic which resumed online and/or in person, depending on the congregation. Missionaries with pre-existing health conditions were sent home.

== Statistics and other information ==
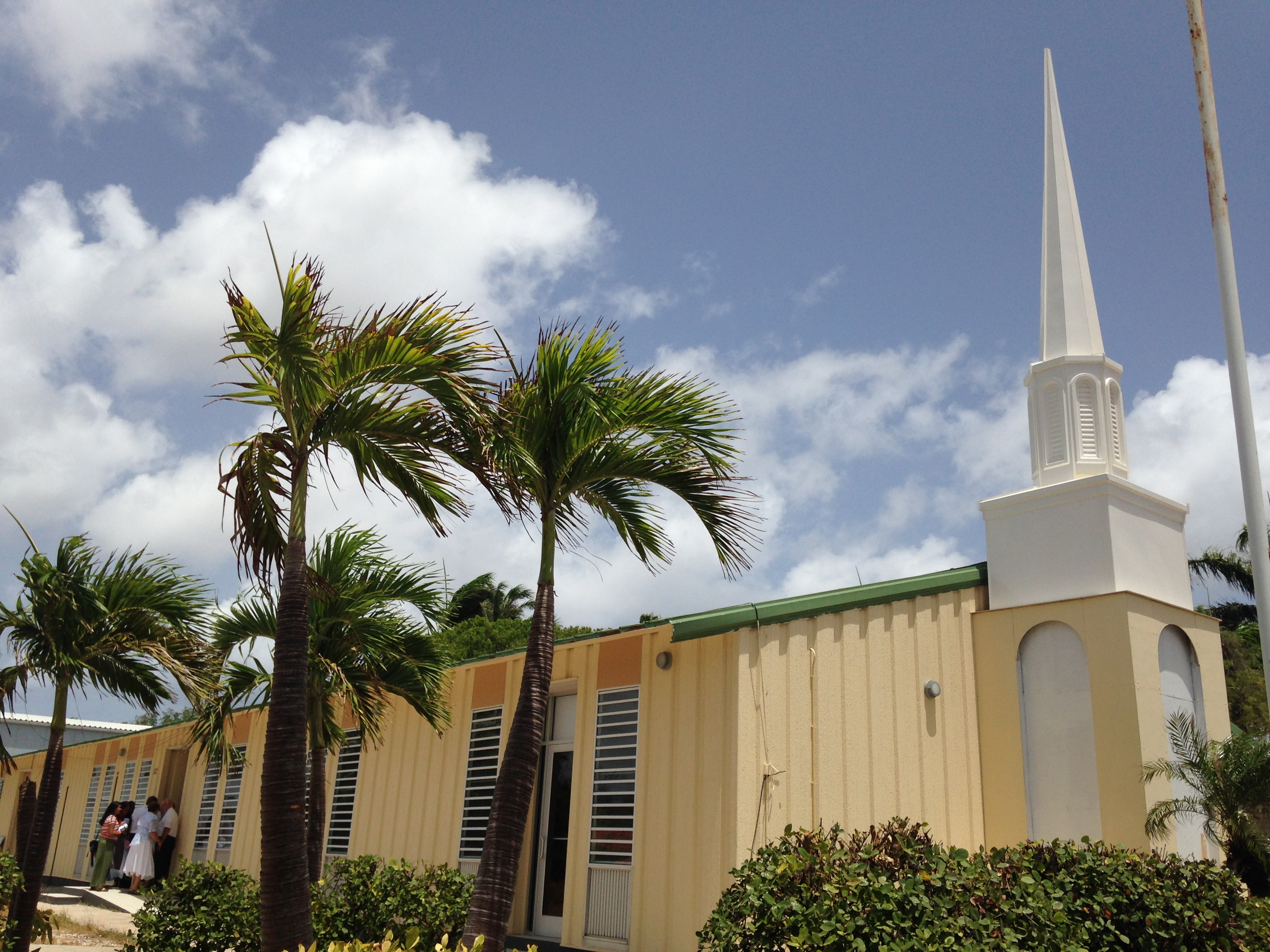
The Church of Jesus Christ of Latter-day Saints in Curacao.

Unless otherwise noted, the following existed in the Netherlands in 2022. Branches in Aruba, Bonaire, and Curaco are located in the ABC Islands District of the Trinidad Port of Spain Mission. The ABC District office is located in Oranjestad, Aruba. The Philippsburg Branch on Sint Maarten is not part of any district or stake and is in the Barbados Bridgetown Mission. Regardless of size, all congregations not part of a stake are called branches.

Region	Membership	Congregations	Family History Centers
Netherlands	9,185	24	9
Aruba	686	2	2
Bonaire	80	1	1
Curaçao	639	1	1
Sint Maarten	358	1	

=== Stakes ===
Stake Centers and Temple in the Netherlands
Red=Operating Temple
Green = Stake Center

As of August 2026, the following stakes existed in the Netherlands:

Stake	Organized	Wards	Branches
Apeldoorn Netherlands Stake	14 May 1989	5	2
Breda Netherlands Stake	16 Oct 1994	6	1
The Hague Netherlands Stake	12 Aug 1976	7	2

=== Missions ===
- Belgium Brussels/Netherlands Mission

== Temples ==
The Hague Netherlands Temple was dedicated on September 8, 2002 by President Gordon B. Hinckley. Dutch members of the Church more commonly call it "the temple in Zoetermeer." Prior to its construction, they attended the Bern Switzerland Temple and the Frankfurt Germany Temple. An open house was held in August 2002, during which 33,000 visitors toured the temple. The Dutch press reported its progress throughout construction. It sits four meters below sea level. It is currently closed.

114. The Hague Netherlands Temple; Official website; News & images	
Location: Announced: Groundbreaking: Dedicated: Size: Style:	Zoetermeer, Netherlands; 16 August 1999 by Gordon B. Hinckley; 26 August 2000 by John K. Carmack; 8 September 2002 by Gordon B. Hinckley; 14,477 sq ft (1,345.0 m^{2}) on a 2.7-acre (1.1 ha) site Classic modern, single-spire design - designed by Albert van Eerde

== See also ==
- Religion in the Netherlands
- The Church of Jesus Christ of Latter-day Saints in the Lesser Antilles
- The Best Two Years, a fictional film depiction of LDS missionaries in the Netherlands
