= John Carmack (disambiguation) =

John Carmack may refer to:

- John Carmack (born 1970), game programmer
- John K. Carmack (born 1931), leader and historian in The Church of Jesus Christ of Latter-day Saints
- John Carmack, structural-mechanical designer and contractor and candidate in the United States House of Representatives elections in Washington, 2010
