= Tiger Flowers Cemetery =

Historic African-American cemetery in Florida

Coordinates: 28.0534°N 81.9438°W

- Interactive map of Tiger Flowers Cemetery

Details
- Location: Lakeland, Florida
- Type: African American cemetery

Tiger Flowers Cemetery is an African American cemetery in Lakeland, Florida. Most of its burials are in above-ground crypts. It is now city-owned and has struggled with maintenance issues and poor record-keeping.

== History ==
The cemetery is named for boxer Tiger Flowers, with the name being applied "long after" the cemetery established. Since the 1930s or 1940s, it has been owned by the city of Lakeland. As of 2013, many of the crypts had received major damage from the elements, with two skeletons being visible from the surface. In 2015, schoolchildren of a montessori school showed interest in revitalizing the cemetery and giving it historic status.

Cemeteries in the area were segregated, and Tiger Flowers Cemetery is near the Roselawn Cemetery, which includes a section for Confederate soldiers. Relocation of a Confederate statue from Lakeland's Munn Park to Roselawn Cemetery's Confederate section a 1/4 mile away from the African American burial ground was considered by the city. The statue was removed in 2018. Its removal was challenged by several individuals, but this challenge was rejected by a federal appeals court in 2020.

== Notable burials ==
- Henry Wilkins Chandler (1852–1938), lawyer and politician
