= Thomas W. Talley =

American chemist and folklorist

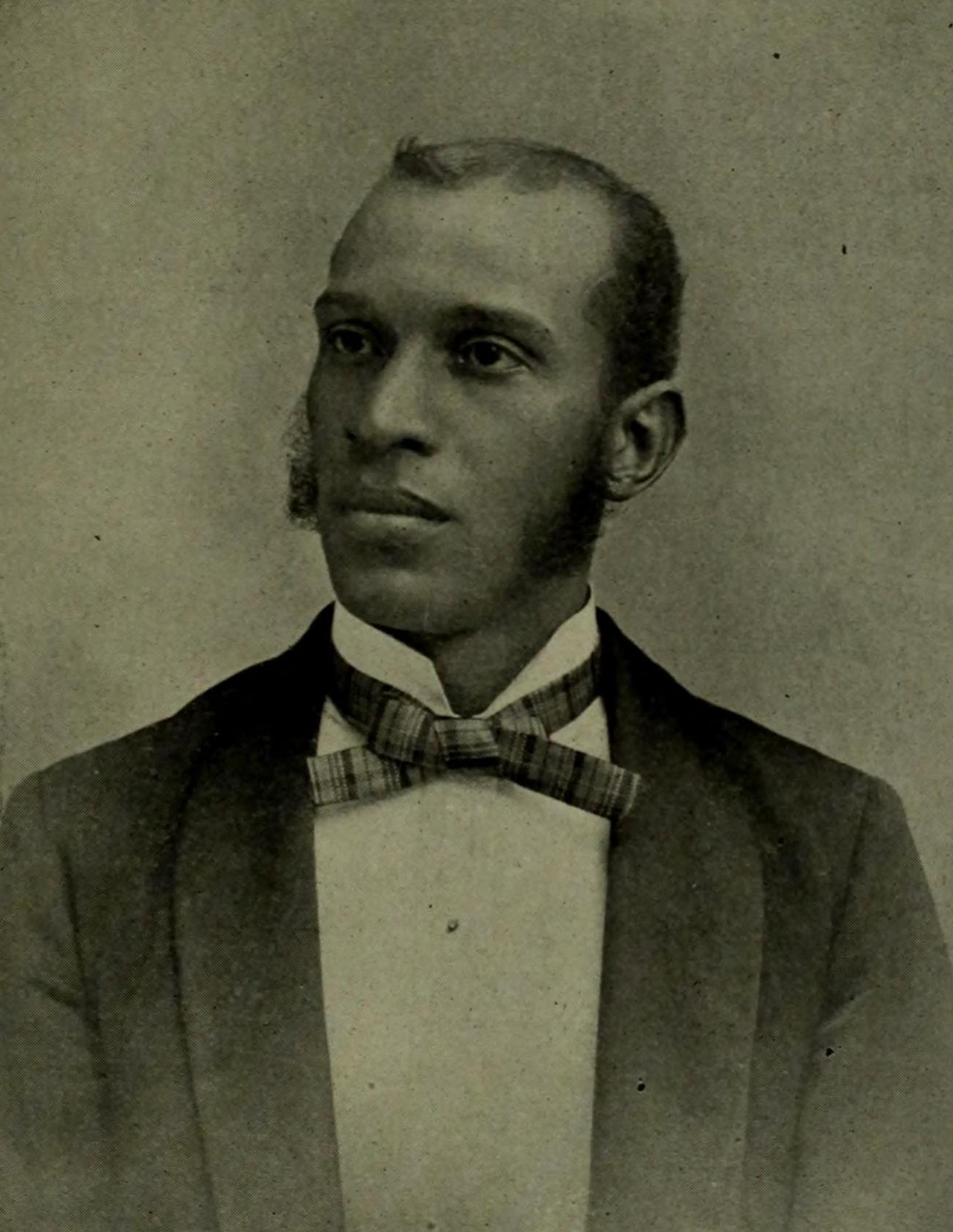
- Talley circa 1902
- Born: October 9, 1868; Shelbyville, Tennessee, U.S.
- Died: July 11, 1952 (aged 83); Nashville, Tennessee, U.S.
- Education: Fisk University
- Scientific career
- Workplaces: Fisk University

Thomas Washington Talley (October 9, 1868 – July 11, 1952) was a chemistry professor at Fisk University and a collector of African American folk songs.

== Early life and education ==
Thomas Washington Talley was born on October 9, 1868, in Shelbyville, Tennessee. He was one of eight children born to former slaves, Charles Washington and Lucinda Talley.

Talley attended public school for six years, followed by high school and college at Fisk University in Nashville, Tennessee, where he received an A.B. in 1890 and a master's degree in 1893. Starting in 1888 he participated in the Fisk music program, singing with the New Fisk Jubilee Singers and the Mozart Society, as well as the Fisk Union Church. He also conducted the Fisk choir for a number of seasons.

Talley received a Doctor of Science degree from Walden University in 1899. After completing his doctorate, Talley went on to participate in post graduate programs at Harvard University in 1914 and 1916. He completed his dissertation at the University of Chicago years later in 1931, at the age of 61. The title of his dissertation is Theories relating to the constitution of the boron hydrides.

== Interests ==
=== Chemistry ===
Talley held teaching positions at several black colleges: Alcorn A&M College in Lorman, Mississippi, in 1891; at Florida A&M in Tallahassee, Florida, in 1893; and Tuskegee Institute in Tuskegee, Alabama, in 1900.

From 1903 to 1942, Talley taught chemistry and biology at Fisk University. He also chaired the chemistry department at Fisk for 25 years. Talley-Brady Hall on Fisk's campus is named for Thomas Talley and St. Elmo Brady, another Fisk alumnus and chemist who was a student of Talley's.

=== Negro Folk Rhymes (Wise and Otherwise) ===
Talley began collecting rural black folk songs later in his life. Talley's first collection, published in 1922, Negro Folk Rhymes (Wise and Otherwise) contained 349 secular folksongs and spirituals. Already being well-known as the first such collection assembled by an African-American scholar, the book was seen at the time as a "masterpiece of the field". It was not only the first compilation of African-American secular folk songs, but also of folk songs of any kind from Tennessee. An edited edition of Negro Folk Rhymes was re-released in 1991. Additional published works about music by Talley include The Origin of Negro Traditions and A Systematic Chronology of Creation.

The publication of Negro Folk Rhymes marked a turning point in the study of African-American verse. Before its publication, little note had been taken of black secular traditions. Talley's book, along with a later collection by Howard Odum and Guy Johnson, called attention to these works.

== Personal life ==
Talley married Ellen Eunice Roberts on August 28, 1899. The couple had two daughters.
