= Frances Miller Mumaugh =

American painter

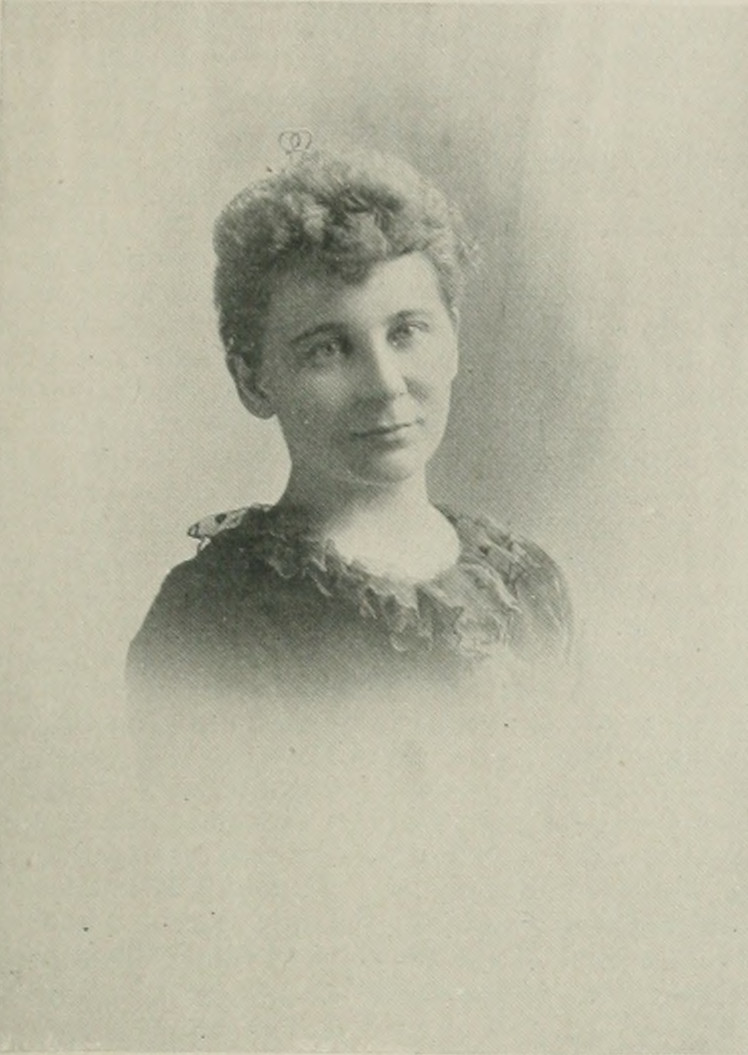
Frances Miller Mumaugh, "A woman of the century"

Frances Miller Mumaugh (July 11, 1859 – May 28, 1933) was an American still life painter. She exhibited an oil, Beulah's Dog, at the World's Congress of Representative Women of the World's Columbian Exposition in Chicago, 1893; and was also an exhibitor at the Louisiana Purchase Exposition, 1904.

== Early years and education ==
Frances Miller was born in Newark, New York, on July 11, 1859 to German immigrants Frank and Mary Miller. Frances passed her childhood in the Genesee Valley until she and her parents moved to Kendallville, Indiana and later Eaton Rapids, Michigan in 1878, where Frank worked in the harness trade.

Frances attended public schools and became accomplished in her art despite having no formal training in her childhood outside of the classroom.

== Life and career ==
=== Marriage ===
Frances married John E. Mumaugh, of Van Wert, Ohio, on February 25, 1879 in Chicago. The couple resided briefly in Toledo, Ohio before moving to Eaton Rapids, Michigan in 1880. John, a stenographer, moved to Omaha, Nebraska by 1881. Frances joined him in early 1882 and the couple bore their first child, a daughter named Beulah, on February 1, 1883. The couple had a second child, an unnamed son, in 1884 or 1885 who was stillborn or died in infancy. Frances and John separated around 1886, and John died in a poor house in Indianapolis on April 6, 1894.

=== Career ===
Mumaugh became a notable figure in the Omaha art scene, keeping a studio in the city's Paxton block where she worked, taught classes, and exhibited her art. She most frequently painted landscapes, still life scenes (typically of flowers or fruit), animals, seascapes, and landscapes, using oils and water colors in the realist style. Mumaugh traveled extensively, visiting Colorado, Michigan, New England, and western Europe for inspiration, among other places. Beulah typically stayed with her grandparents during her mother's travels.

Mumaugh was primarily self-taught but studied under other artists intermittently, including a water color course under Chicago artist Jules Guérin, an oil course under Parisian artist Dwight Frederick Boyden, and several courses under William Merritt Chase. Chase was a notable late 19th and early 20th century American Impressionist artist who helped to open the Shinnecock Hills Summer School of Art, of which he was also the director and where Mumaugh also attended for several summers in the 1890s. The school was one of the first and most popular plein air painting schools in the U.S.

Mumaugh became a founding member of the Western Art Association in 1888 and served on its board of directors. The Omaha-based association exhibited members' work and held art classes. She conducted the art department in the Long Pine Chautauqua from 1889-1892.

In 1893, Mumaugh exhibited Beulah's Dog, an oil depicting a cocker spaniel, at the World's Columbian Exposition. In 1898, Mumaugh exhibited 14 oil and 25 water colors at the Trans-Mississippi Exposition in Omaha. Later that year, she joined the faculty of Brownell Hall, where Beulah attended. Mumaugh also exhibited work at the Louisiana Purchase Exposition in 1904.

=== Later life and career ===
In 1904, Mumaugh left Omaha to live, work, and study in New York City, though she frequently returned to Omaha to exhibit her work. In New York she expanded her production to include jewelry, often in silver and turquoise, and unsigned greeting and holiday cards. She opened a novelty shop in Maplewood, New Jersey in 1923 before moving into Beulah's home in Portage, Pennsylvania by 1930. There she died on May 28, 1933 at the age of 74. She was buried in Bedford County, Pennsylvania.

Much of Mumaugh's work was signed, but rarely titled and only occasionally dated.

== Gallery ==
Mumaugh's still life paintings

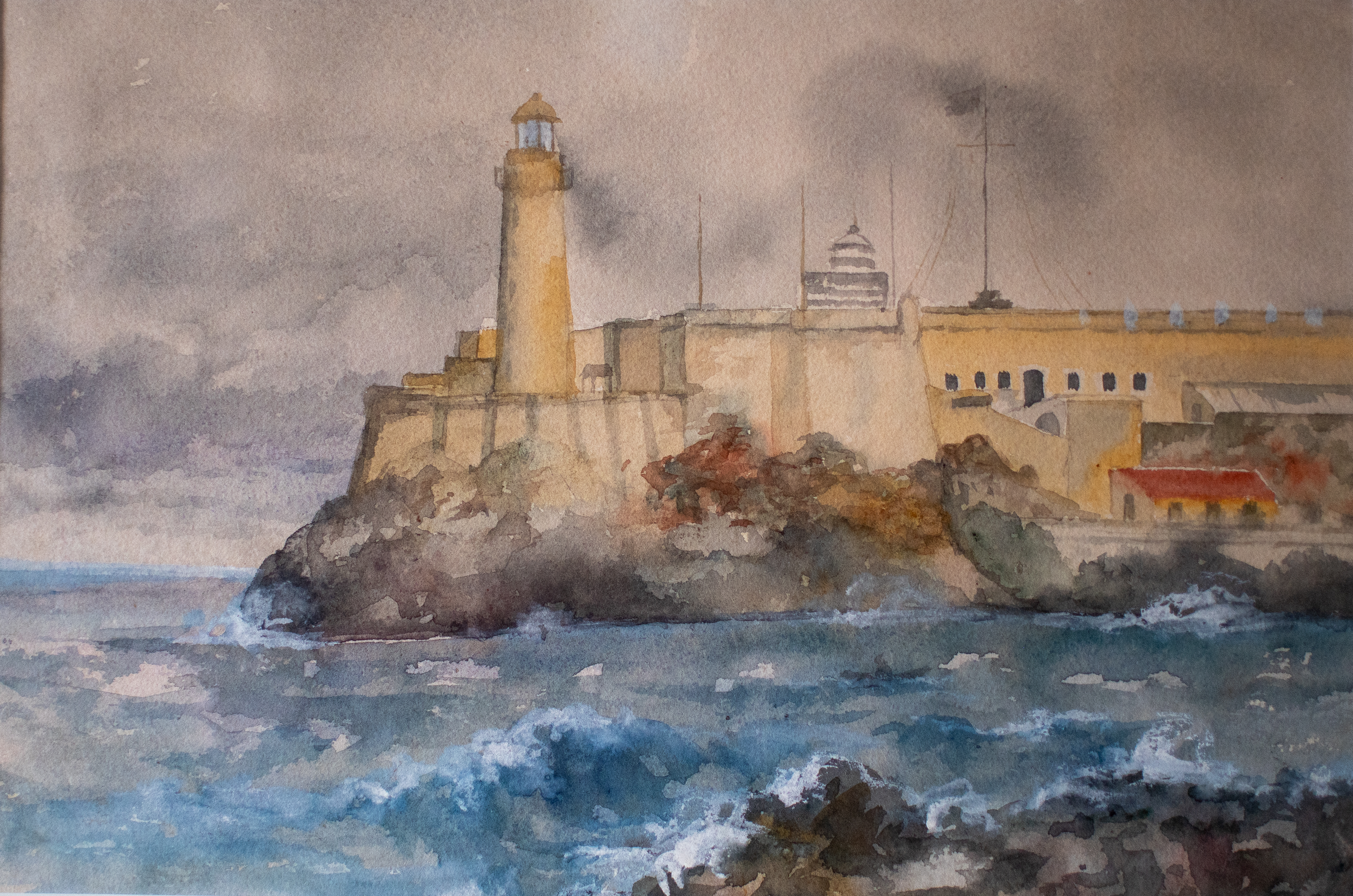

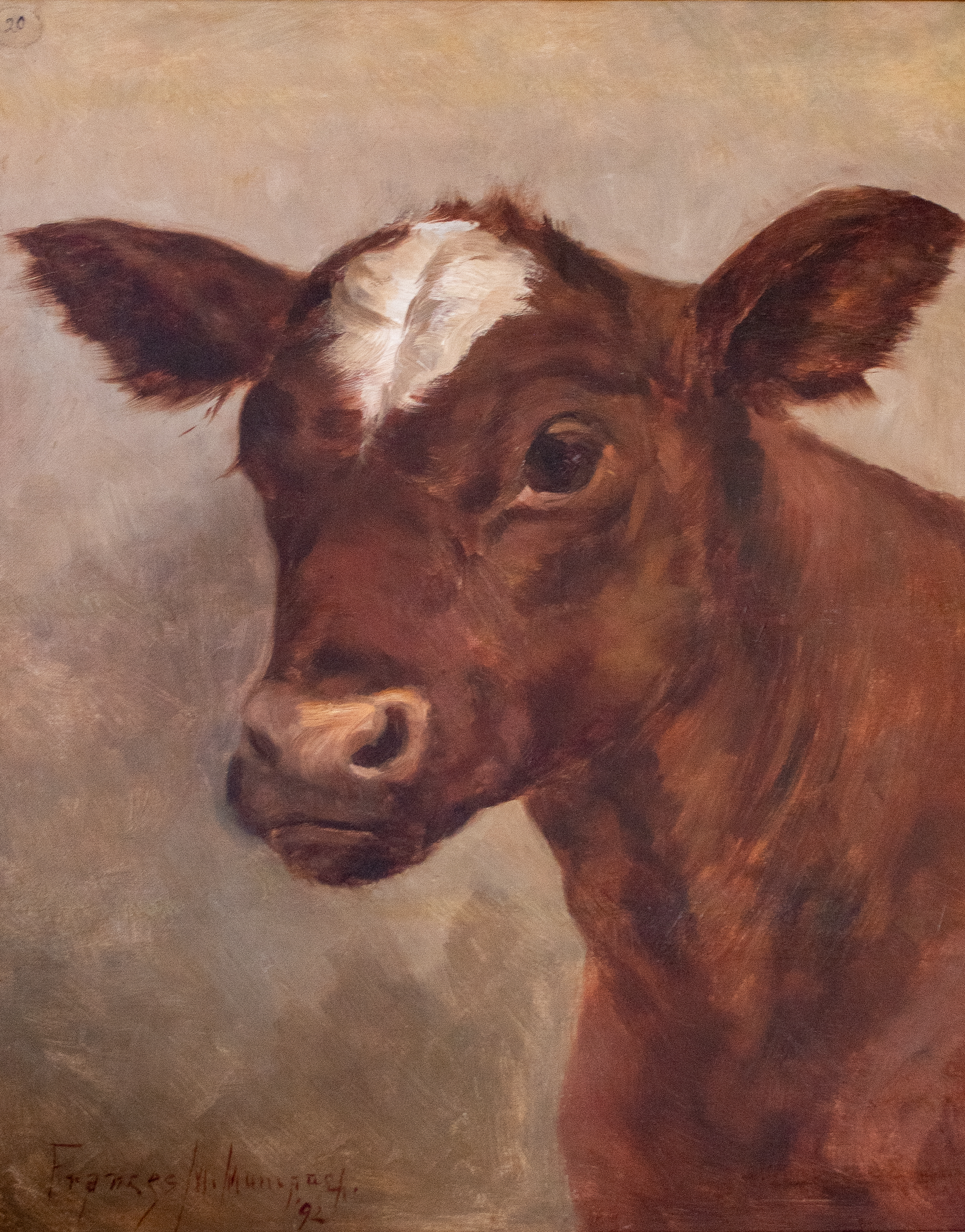

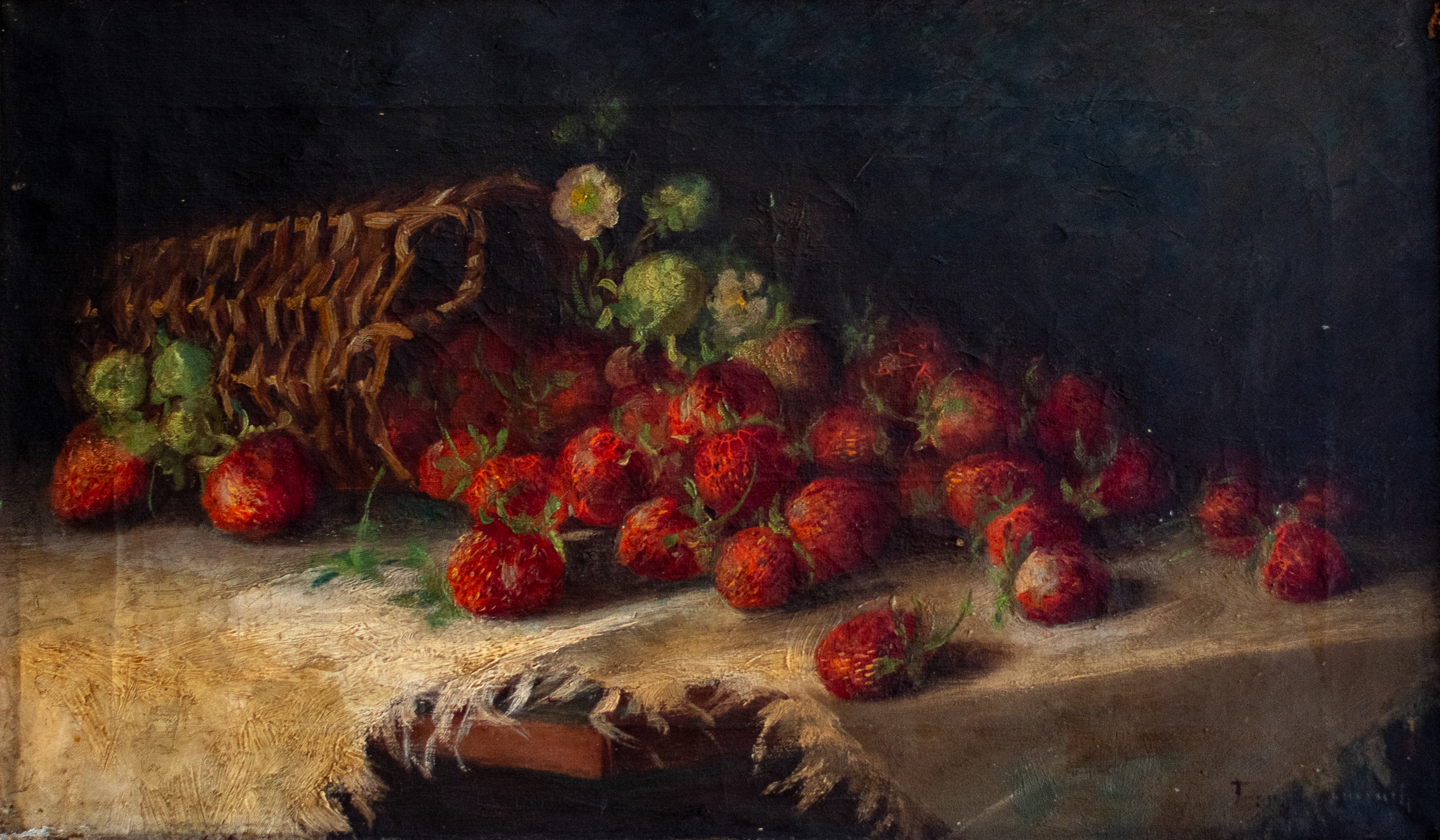

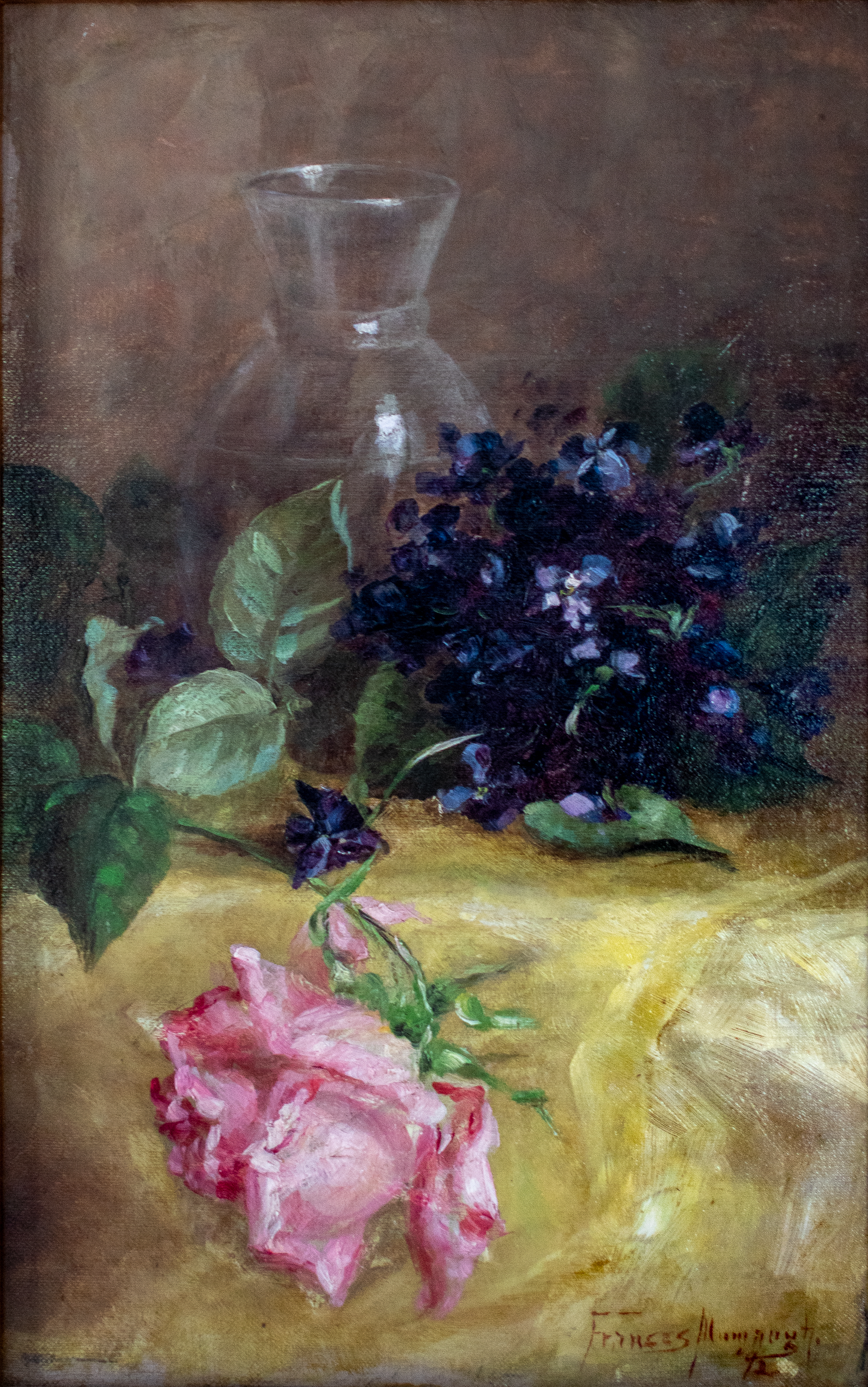

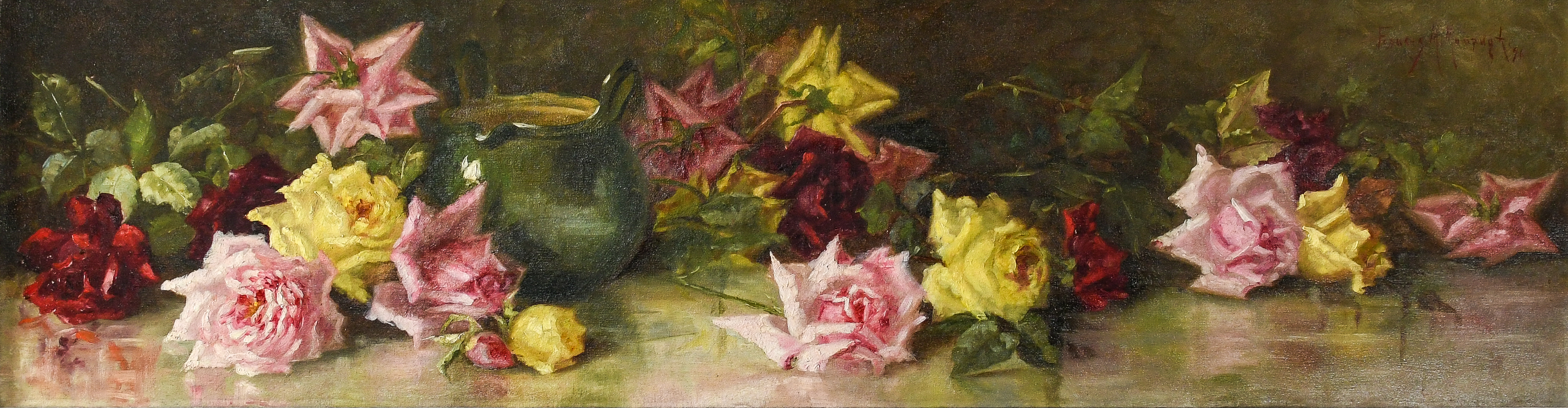

Mumaugh's Christmas card designs (1920)

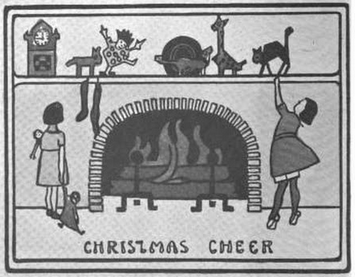

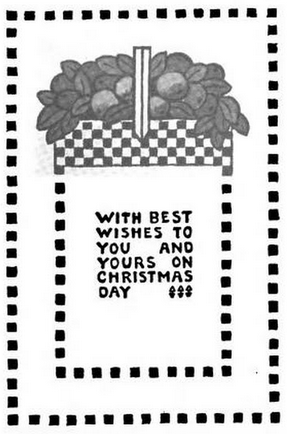

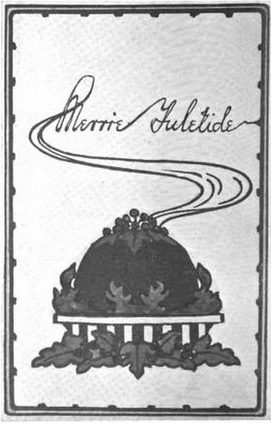

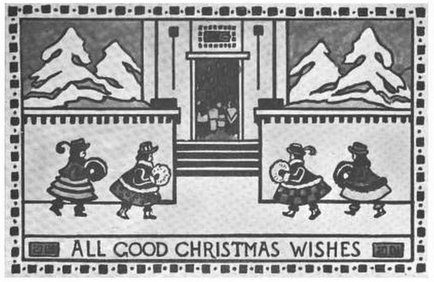

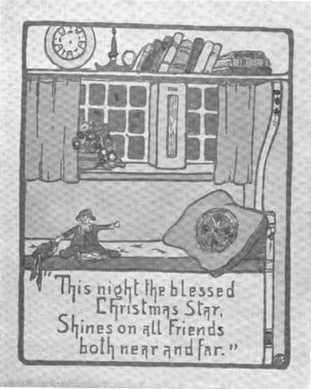

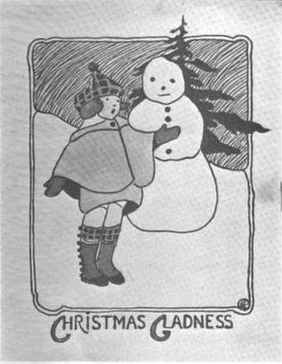

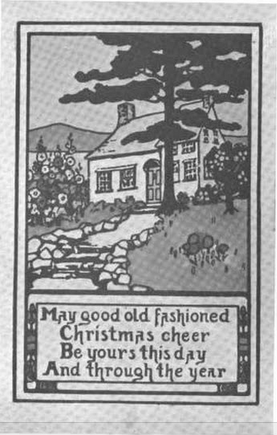

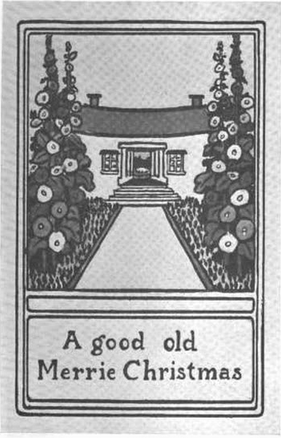

Mumaugh's Christmas gift tag designs (1920)
