= Jackson–Perkins House =

Historic house in New York, United States

- U.S. National Register of Historic Places
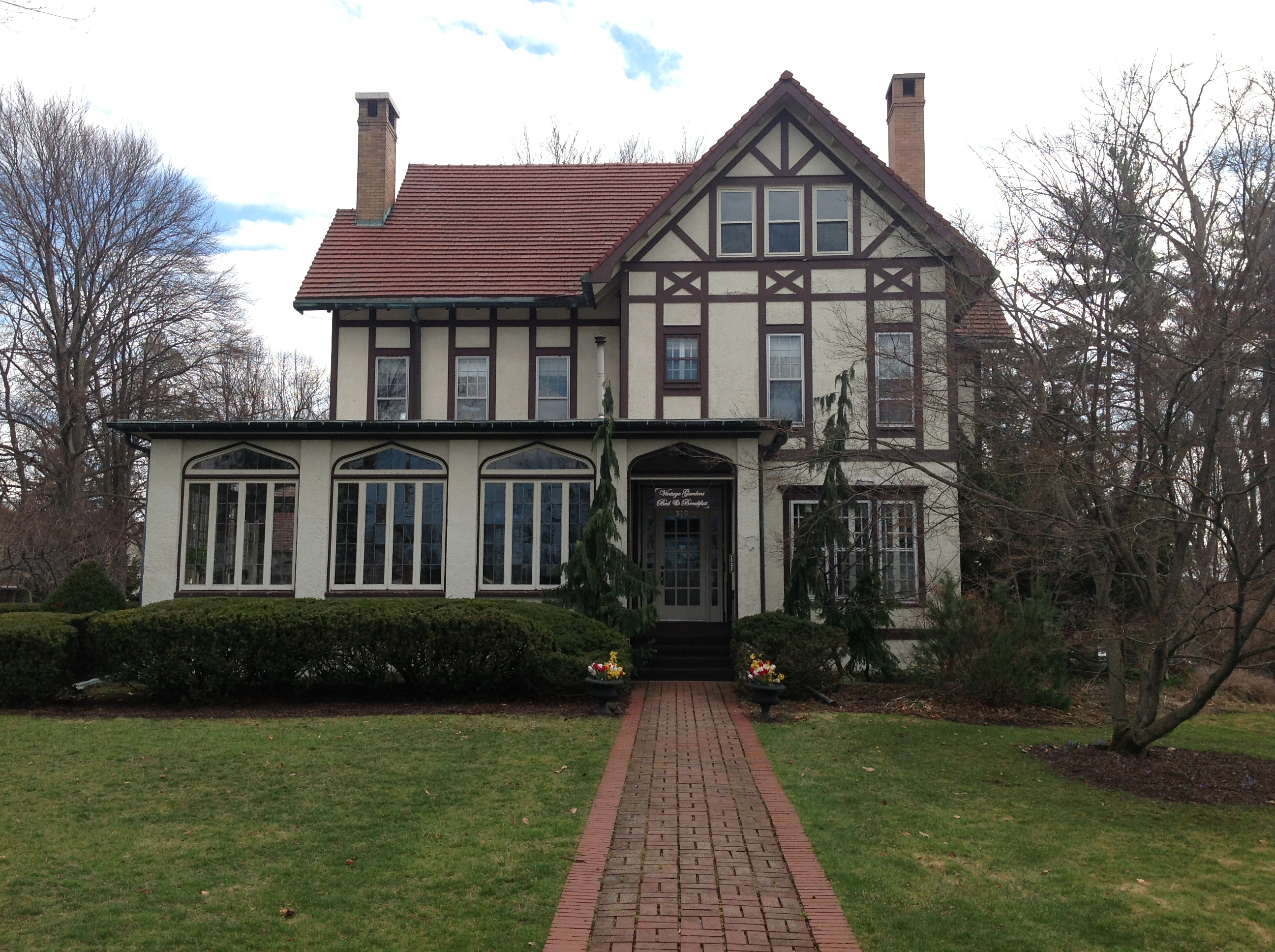
- Jackson–Perkins House, April 2013

- Location within New York Location within the United States
- Location: 310 High St., Newark, New York
- Coordinates: 43°2′39″N 77°5′58″W
- Area: 2.7 acres (1.1 ha)
- Architect: Keener, Stephen N.; Krabbenschmidt, E.A.P.
- Architectural style: Tudor Revival
- NRHP reference No.: 06000567
- Added to NRHP: July 14, 2006

The Jackson–Perkins House is a historic home located at Newark in Wayne County, New York. It is a Tudor Revival style residence purchased in 1864, rebuilt in 1889, and remodeled to its current form in 1921–1922. It was once the home of the Jackson and Perkins families, who once operated a large rose growing facility nearby known as Jackson & Perkins Company. On the 2.66-acre (10,800 m^{2}) property are elements of the original landscape design including the entrance drive, access path, formal fountain in a garden setting, greenhouse foundation, and many mature trees and shrubs.

It was listed on the National Register of Historic Places in 2006 and is currently a bed and breakfast.
