= The Church of Jesus Christ of Latter-day Saints in Kentucky =

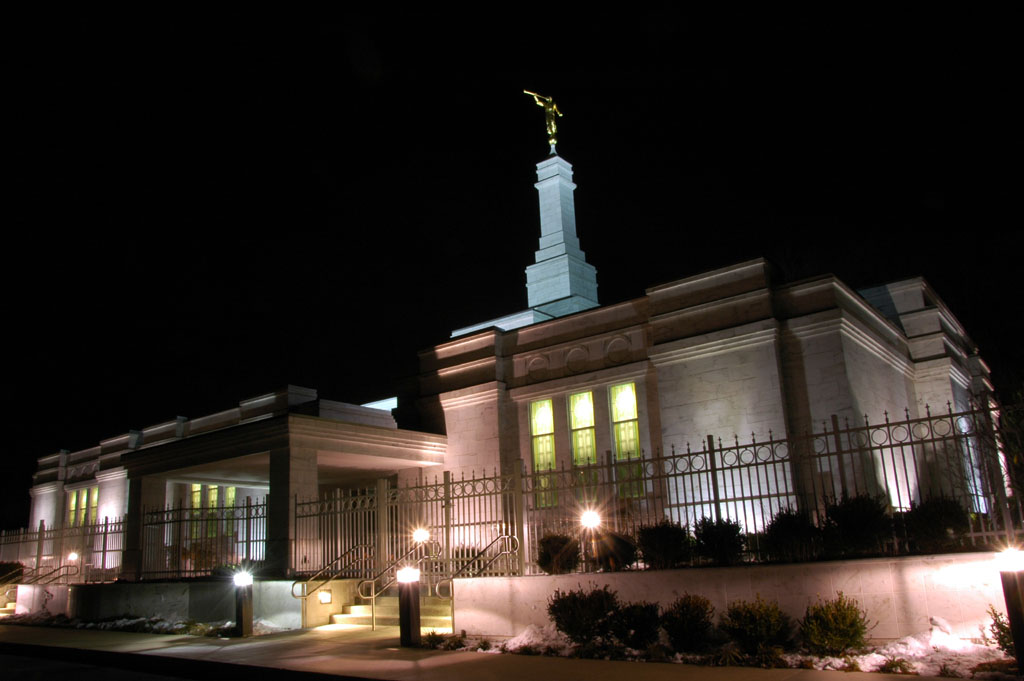
- The Louisville Kentucky Temple
- Area: US Southeast
- Members: 39,792 (2025)
- Stakes: 8
- Wards: 51
- Branches: 32
- Total Congregations: 83
- Missions: 1
- Temples: 1
- FamilySearch Centers: 28

The Church of Jesus Christ of Latter-day Saints in Kentucky refers to the Church of Jesus Christ of Latter-day Saints (LDS Church) and its members in Kentucky. The first small branch was established in 1834. In 2022, the church claimed 39,792 members in 83 congregations.

According to the 2014 Pew Forum on Religion & Public Life survey, less than 1% of Kentuckians self-identify themselves most closely with the LDS Church.

Stakes are located in Crestwood, Elizabethtown, Hopkinsville, Lexington (2), Louisville, and Paducah.

== History ==
In 1835, two missionaries baptized 22 people and the first group of Kentucky Saints left for Missouri in September 1836.

In 2011, Lexington native Rob Hymas, became an area seventy and oversaw 10 stake presidents in Kentucky and Tennessee.

== Stakes ==
As of July 2026, there were 8 stakes with their stake center located in Kentucky.

Stakes with congregations in Kentucky are as follows:

Stake	Organized	Mission	Temple district
Bowling Green Kentucky Stake	June 14, 2026	Tennessee Nashville	Nashville Tennessee
Cincinnati Ohio	November 23, 1958	Ohio Cincinnati Mission	Louisville Kentucky
Cincinnati Ohio East	February 15, 2004	Ohio Cincinnati Mission	Columbus Ohio
Clarksville Tennessee	May 21, 1978	Tennessee Nashville	Nashville Tennessee
Crestwood Kentucky	March 21, 2010	Kentucky Louisville	Louisville Kentucky
Elizabethtown Kentucky	November 5, 2017	Kentucky Louisville	Louisville Kentucky
Evansville Indiana	October 19, 1975	Kentucky Louisville	Louisville Kentucky
Huntington West Virginia	November 7, 1982	West Virginia Charleston	Louisville Kentucky
Knoxville Tennessee Cumberland	November 17, 1996	Tennessee Knoxville	Nashville Tennessee
Lexington Kentucky	April 23, 1972	Kentucky Louisville	Louisville Kentucky
Lexington Kentucky North	November 23, 2003	Kentucky Louisville	Louisville Kentucky
Louisville Kentucky	January 17, 1971	Kentucky Louisville	Louisville Kentucky
Paducah Kentucky	October 20, 1996	Tennessee Nashville	Nashville Tennessee

== Mission ==
The East Central States Mission was created on December 9, 1928, which took in portions of what was previously Southern States Mission and Eastern States Mission. Kentucky itself was previously in the Southern States Mission. On June 10, 1970, it was renamed the Kentucky-Tennessee Mission. On June 20, 1974, it was renamed the Kentucky Louisville Mission.

== Temples ==
The Louisville Kentucky Temple was dedicated on March 19, 2000, by President Thomas S. Monson.

76. Louisville Kentucky Temple; Official website; News & images	
Location: Announced: Groundbreaking: Dedicated: Size: Style:	Peewee Valley, Kentucky, United States; March 17, 1999 by Gordon B. Hinckley; May 29, 1999 by John K. Carmack; March 19, 2000 by Thomas S. Monson; 10,700 sq ft (990 m^{2}) on a 3-acre (1.2 ha) site Classic modern, single-spire design - designed by Firestone Jaros Mullin--Mike Karpinski Architect

== See also ==
- The Church of Jesus Christ of Latter-day Saints membership statistics (United States)
