= Henry Wilkins Chandler =

African-American lawyer and politician

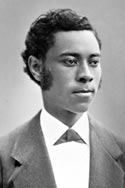

Florida Senate
- In office 1881–1887

Personal details
- Born: September 22, 1852 Bath, Maine, U.S.
- Died: 1938 (aged 85–86) Polk County, Florida, U.S.
- Resting place: Tiger Flowers Cemetery
- Party: Republican
- Spouse: Annie M. Onley
- Children: 6
- Parent(s): Julia Ann (Fry) and Henry Augustus Chandler
- Education: Bates College (1874); Howard University(1876)

Henry Wilkins Chandler (September 22, 1852 – 1938) was an American lawyer, newspaperman, politician, and federal official. Born a freeman, he was the first African American graduate from Bates College in Lewiston, Maine. He served two terms in the Florida State Senate.

== Early life and education ==
Chandler was born September 22, 1852, in Bath, Maine, to Julia Ann (Fry) and Henry Augustus Chandler, a Baptist church deacon and barber. Chandler received his primary education at Bath's public schools and enrolled in Bates College in 1870. He went on to become an editor of the college's student-run newspaper, The Bates Student, and served on the executive committee of the Eurosophian Literary Society. He was the first African American student to graduate from the university.

Upon graduating from Bates in 1874, he went on to attend Howard University, and graduated with a law degree three years later. While attending Howard University from 1874 to 1876, he also taught classes at Howard.

== Career ==
After completion of his law degree he moved to Florida, passed the Florida Bar, and began to practice law in Ocala, Florida, in 1878. He also became active in his church affairs and was selected to be a deacon in the Mount Moriah Baptist Church in Ocala. He began to edit local newspapers such as The Ocala Republican and The Plain Dealer.

After his brief stint in newspaper publishing he was elected to the Florida Senate in 1880 from the nineteenth district comprising Marion County, Florida. He held the office for two terms. He also held a number of political positions in Ocala, including clerk and alderman. He was also the city clerk for Jacksonville. Chandler was chosen to be a state delegate to the Republican National Convention several times.

As a state senator he was photographed with some of his colleagues. He was Inspector of Customs in Tampa from 1908 until 1913. When U.S. President Woodrow Wilson dismissed all African American federal officials in Florida in 1913 he lost his job as inspector of customs in the town of Port Tampa. He is buried in Tiger Flowers Cemetery.

== Personal life ==
On October 2, 1884, he married Annie M. Onley, a teacher in Jacksonville who was a native of New York. Her brother Douglas Watson Onley was a prominent dentist. They had at least six children, including their eldest son, Edward Marion Augustus Chandler (1887–1973), who was the second African American in the United States to receive a Ph.D. in Chemistry and a founding faculty member at Roosevelt University in Chicago.

After Annie Chandler's death, Henry Chandler remarried in 1914 to Maggie J. Adams, an active church member and dressmaker from Tampa. Henry Chandler was an active Freemason.
