= Marilyn Leavitt-Imblum =

American cross-stitch embroidery designer

- Born: Marilyn J. Leavitt; August 1, 1946; Youngstown, Ohio
- Died: August 14, 2012 (aged 66); Newark, New York
- Known for: Embroidery Design

Marilyn Leavitt-Imblum (August 1, 1946 – August 14, 2012) was an American cross-stitch embroidery designer known especially for her Victorian angel designs. Her designs were published under the business name Told in a Garden, with product divisions of Told in a Garden, Lavender and Lace, and Butternut Road.

== Biography ==
=== Early life ===
Marilyn J. Leavitt was born August 1, 1946, in Youngstown, Ohio, where she attended Ursuline High School. She was the daughter of Marcella (née O'Toole) and Earle Leavitt. She had one brother, Bruce.

=== Career ===
Her professional design career began in the 1960s, working as an advertising and fashion illustrator for Strouss and Hartzell, Rose and Sons.

Leavitt-Imblum began publishing embroidery designs around 1986, when she showed her original design "The Quilting", depicting an Amish quilting bee, to the owner of a local needlework shop who told her that if she graphed the design the shop would sell it. The first 25 copies sold almost immediately. Within a decade, her Victorian angel designs were considered among the most popular cross-stitch designs available. In 2000, she publicly stated her opposition to the unlicensed sharing of needlework patterns on the Internet.

=== Personal life ===
She was married three times and had six children: Jeff, Nora, and Elizabeth Adams, Corriander Master "Corrie Ferenchak”, and Matt and Sarah Imblum. She had multiple sclerosis but did not widely publicize the fact. She died on August 14, 2012, in Newark, New York, aged 66.

Her daughter Nora is an artist and fellow cross-stitch embroidery designer, under her married name, Nora Corbett.
