= Helen Balfour Morrison =

American photographer (1900–1984)

- Born: Helen Balfour; August 1, 1900; Evanston, Illinois, U.S.
- Died: November 6, 1984 (aged 84)
- Resting place: Rosehill Cemetery
- Known for: Documentary photographer
- Notable work: Great Americans, Notable Americans series
- Spouse: Robert Bruce Morrison

Helen Balfour Morrison (August 1, 1900 – November 6, 1984) was an American photographer best known for her collaborations with dancer Sybil Shearer. Her work is in the collection of the Museum of Modern Art, the Chicago Film Archives, the Smithsonian Archives of American Art as well as many other institutions.

== Personal life ==
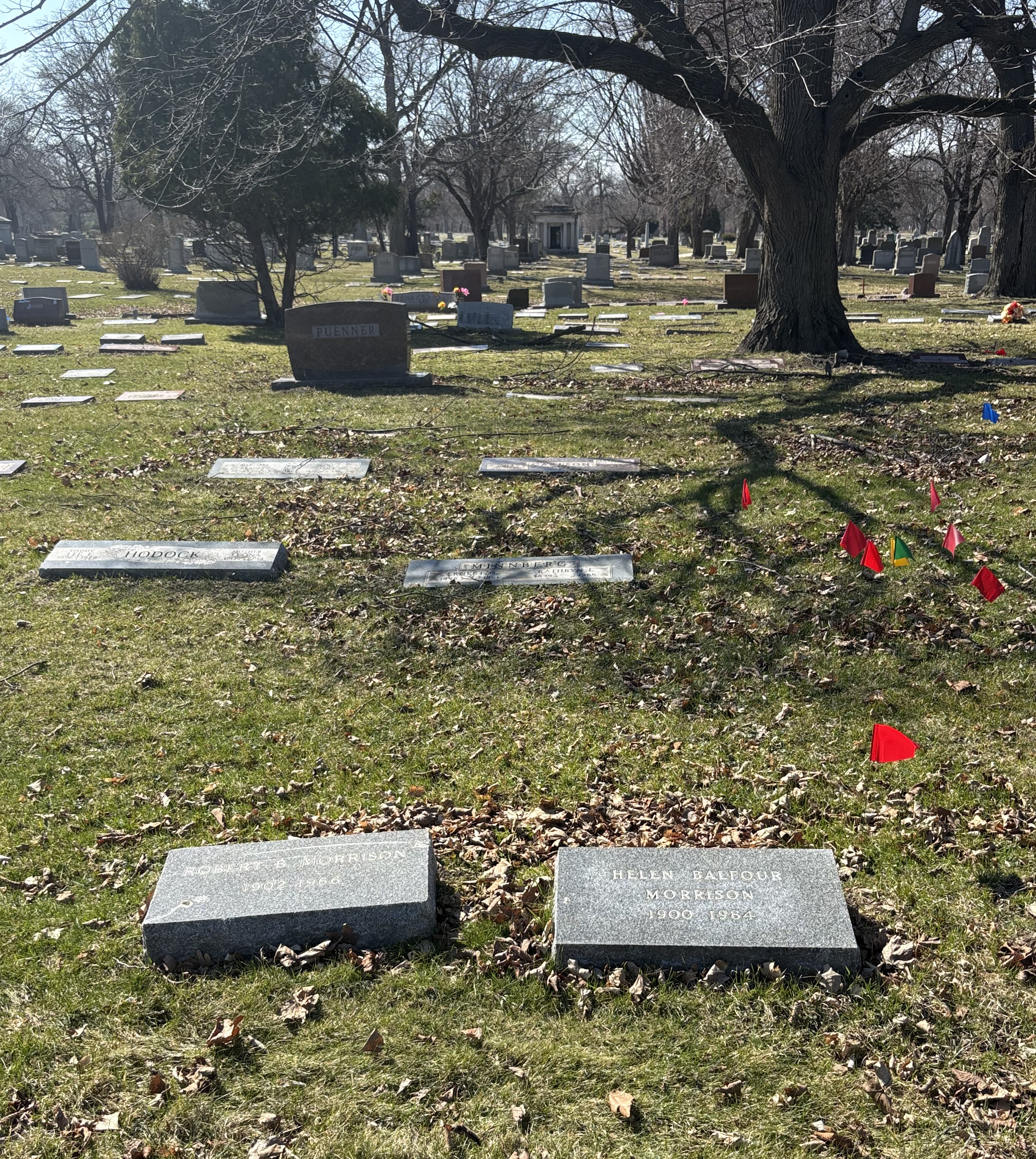
Morrison's grave at Rosehill Cemetery

Helen Balfour Morrison was born in Evanston, Illinois to Fannie Susan Lindley and Alexander Balfour. Morrison's mother died when she was 17. At age 16 Morrison took a job in a photography studio to help make ends meet.

She died on November 6, 1984, and was buried at Rosehill Cemetery in Chicago.

== Career ==
One of her first projects was a documentary series of photographs depicting African American life in Great Depression-era Kentucky. In a region near Lexington, she photographed the residents of the small communities of Zion Hill and Sugar Hill.

In her late twenties Morrison began the Great Americans series — portraits of such Chicago-area notables as Jane Addams, Nelson Algren, Saul Bellow, Amelia Earhart, Ludwig Mies van der Rohe, and Frank Lloyd Wright. However she also shot portraits of ordinary people. Morrison shot these portraits in Chicago and New York, and the series became well-known with exhibitions in museums all over the country. Critic J. B. Newman wrote that Morrison was able to "photograph the soul."

In 1942, Morrison met dancer and choreographer Sybil Shearer. From that point forward, her work became more focused on documenting Shearer's life and work through an extraordinary production of photographs and films. As time went by, Morrison de-emphasized her own career to help manage and promote Shearer's affairs. The Morrison-Shearer Film Collection, which is administered by the Chicago Film Archives, contains over 400 16 mm films, nearly 200 8 mm films, and 200 quarter-inch audio reels.

== Morrison-Shearer foundation ==
The Morrison-Shearer Foundation, was established in 1991 and is based in their home in Northbrook, Illinois.
