= Helen Cary Russell =

American clubwoman and social leader

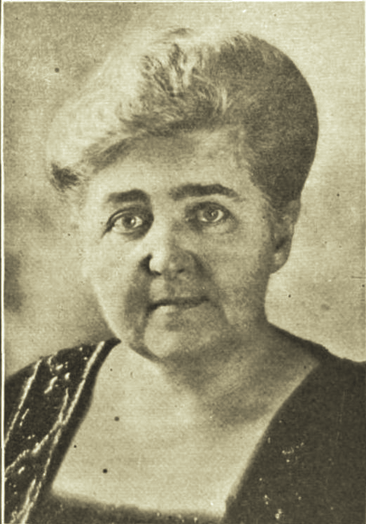
- Mrs. Dorian M. Russell (1924)
- Born: Helen Ellen Cary; August 6, 1870; Newark, New York, U.S.
- Died: October 25, 1946 (aged 76); Michigan, U.S.
- Other names: Mrs. Dorian M. Russell
- Occupations: clubwoman; social leader; magazine editor
- Known for: president, Michigan State Federation of Women's Clubs
- Notable work: editor, Michigan Club Bulletin and the Michigan Federation Forum

Helen Cary Russell (also known as Mrs. Dorian M. Russell; August 6, 1870 – October 25, 1946) was an American clubwoman, social leader, and magazine editor. She served as president of the Michigan State Federation of Women's Clubs (MSFWC) and editor of its organs, the Michigan Club Bulletin and the Michigan Federation Forum. Russell was a member of the Grand Rapids, Michigan school board and the Michigan state library commission.

== Early life and education ==
Helen Ellen Cary was born in Newark, New York, August 6, 1870. (Note: According to Maw (1953), Helen was born in Wayne County, New York on August 6, 1874.) Her parents were Lorenzo J. Cary (1834-1922) and Mary A. (Haskins) Cary (1836-1920).

She completed her secondary education at Newark, before attending the Normal School at Cortland, New York (now, State University of New York at Cortland.

== Career ==
In 1921, in Grand Rapids, Michigan, Russell became the president of the Ladies' Literary Club, and then, president of the Grand Rapids Federation of Women's Clubs. In 1922, Russell became the vice-president of the MSFWC as well as chair of the state's Finance Department. She was elected president of the MSFWC in the following year. During her administration, she had four goals: she sought to bring about a much strong type of cooperation among the clubs and the women that comprised them, a greater responsibility among the clubwomen themselves, and enlargement of the scope of the federation, and the development of a new type of service to the community. She was re-elected president of the MSFWC at the 1924 state convention.

The Michigan Club Bulletin was the MSFWC's official organ from 1907 till 1927 when it was renamed the Michigan Federation Forum. In 1919, Russell joined the board of directors of the Michigan Club Bulletin as Recording Secretary, and during the two following years, she held the office of Vice-president-at-Large. In 1922, Russell became the board president. In October 1926, Russell became the editor of the Michigan Club Bulletin and continued in the role after the organ's rename in the following year.

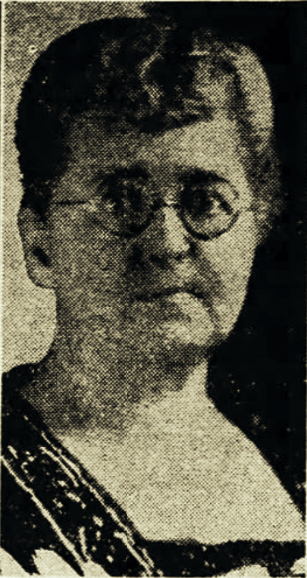
(1923)

Russell became a member of the Grand Rapids school board as early as 1923. In July 1939, while still in that role, she was appointed to a five-year term as a member of the Michigan state library commission.

== Personal life ==
When a young woman, she went to Texas. She met Dorian M. Russell in New Orleans where she was employed as an expert court stenographer. They married in New Orleans on May 19, 1902. During early married life, the couple moved to Marquette, Michigan before removing to Grand Rapids (1907), where they remained thereafter. They had two sons, Orlando (b. 1905) and Joseph (b. 1910).

In 1939, Russell made a prolonged trip to Australia.

In September 1946, Mr. and Mrs. Russell traveled to Syracuse, New York, for a visit with their son and daughter-in-law. The following month, on October 25, Helen Cary Russell died in Michigan.
