= The Hague Netherlands Temple =

Temple of The Church of Jesus Christ of Latter-day Saints

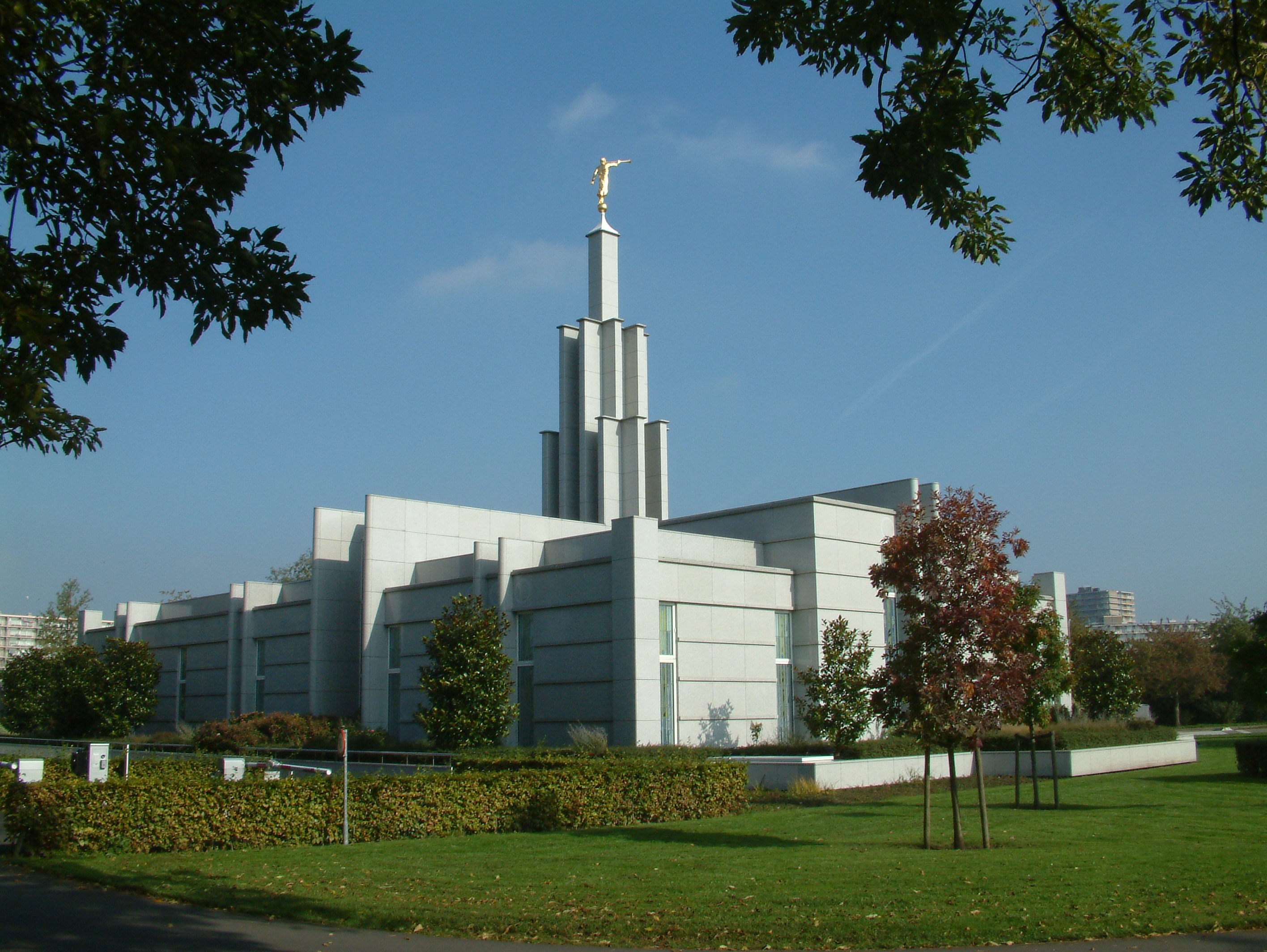
- Interactive map of The Hague Netherlands Temple
- Number: 114
- Dedication: 8 September 2002, by Gordon B. Hinckley
- Site: 2.7 acres (1.1 ha)
- Floor area: 14,477 ft^{2} (1,345.0 m^{2})
- Height: 71 ft (22 m)
- Official website • News & images

Church chronology
← Nauvoo Illinois Temple	The Hague Netherlands Temple	→ Brisbane Australia Temple

Additional information
- Announced: 16 August 1999, by Gordon B. Hinckley
- Groundbreaking: 26 August 2000, by John K. Carmack
- Open house: 17–31 August 2002
- Current president: Buddy Gout
- Designed by: Albert van Eerde
- Location: Zoetermeer, Netherlands
- Coordinates: 52°3′16.15320″N 4°30′10.72439″E
- Exterior finish: Polished granite
- Design: Classic modern, single-spire design
- Baptistries: 1
- Ordinance rooms: 2 (two-stage progressive)
- Sealing rooms: 2

The Hague Netherlands Temple is the 114th operating temple of the Church of Jesus Christ of Latter-day Saints (LDS Church), located on the outskirts of The Hague, Zoetermeer, The Netherlands. It was the church's eighth temple built in Europe, the only temple in the Netherlands. The intent to build the temple was announced on August 16, 1999, by the First Presidency in a letter to local leaders. Services in the temple are held in Dutch, French, and English. Other non-native speakers can follow the services simultaneously in their own language via headphones.

The temple has a single attached spire with a statue of the angel Moroni. The temple was designed by architect Albert van Eerde of the firm H BG Construction, using a classic modern temple design. A groundbreaking ceremony, to signify the beginning of construction, was held on August 26, 2000, conducted by John K. Carmack, a church general authority.

== History ==
The presence of the LDS Church in the Netherlands dates back to 1841 when Orson Hyde, a member of the Quorum of the Twelve Apostles, stayed in the country for more than a week while on his way to Jerusalem. During his visit, he preached the gospel, laying the groundwork for future missionary efforts. However, it was not until 1861 that the church's first official missionaries were sent to the Netherlands. On October 1 of that year, near the village of Broek bij Akkerwoude (now part of the Dantumadeel municipality), the first Dutch converts were baptized.

Over time, thousands of Dutch people joined the LDS Church, though many emigrated to the United States to be near church headquarters in Utah. For many years, church leadership has now encouraged members to remain in their homelands and strengthen the church locally. In 1890, the Book of Mormon was published in Dutch, translated by John W. F. Volker. After its publication, a copy of the Book of Mormon was presented to the king and queen of the Netherlands. The LDS Church has continued to grow steadily in the Netherlands, now comprising three stakes and having more than 9,000 members.

Reflecting this growth, the construction of a church temple in Zoetermeer, a satellite city of The Hague, was announced on August 16, 1999 by the church's First Presidency in a letter to local church leaders. At the time of its construction, Dutch law required buildings to be open to the public, making the temple an exception granted by the government. The name Zoetermeer translates to “sweet lake” in English, drawing a parallel to Salt Lake City, Utah, location of the church's headquarters. Like the temple in Salt Lake City, there is also one in "Sweet Lake City.".

The groundbreaking ceremony and site dedication for The Hague Netherlands Temple took place on August 26, 2000. Serving over 13,000 members from the Netherlands, Belgium, and parts of France, the temple became a spiritual center for church members in the region. After construction was completed, a public open house was held from August 17 to 31, 2002. The temple was dedicated on September 8, 2002, Gordon B. Hinckley, the church's president, in four sessions.

In 2020, like all those in the church, The Hague Netherlands Temple was closed for a time in response to the COVID-19 pandemic.

== Temple presidents ==
The church's temples are directed by a temple president and matron, each serving for a term of three years. The president and matron oversee the administration of temple operations and provide guidance and training for both temple patrons and staff. Serving from 2002 to 2005, the first president of The Hague Netherlands Temple was Anne Hulleman, with Elizabeth J. Hulleman serving as matron. As of 2025, Buddy Gout is the president, with Astrid B. Gout-Spagl as matron.

== Admittance ==
Following the temple’s completion, a public open house was held from August 17-August 31, 2002 (excluding Sundays); during the open house, 32,819 people visited the temple. The temple was dedicated by Gordon B. Hinckley on November 18, 2002, in four sessions.

Like all the church's temples, it is not used for Sunday worship services. To members of the church, temples are regarded as sacred houses of the Lord. Once dedicated, only church members with a current temple recommend can enter for worship.

== See also ==
- Comparison of temples of The Church of Jesus Christ of Latter-day Saints
- List of temples of The Church of Jesus Christ of Latter-day Saints
- List of temples of The Church of Jesus Christ of Latter-day Saints by geographic region
- Temple architecture (Latter-day Saints)
- The Church of Jesus Christ of Latter-day Saints in the Netherlands
