= United States Post Office (Newark, New York) =

- US Post Office-Newark
- U.S. National Register of Historic Places
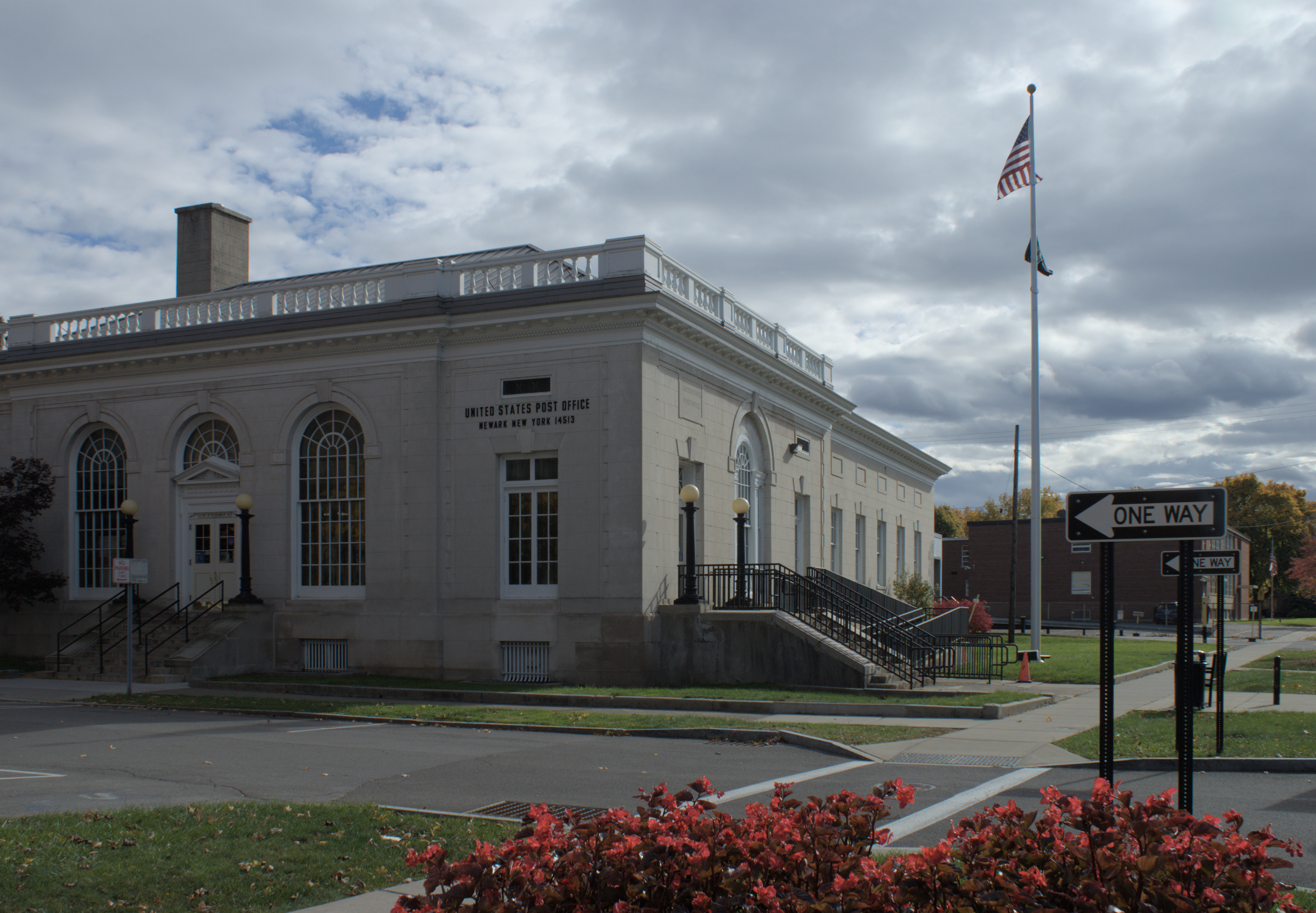
- U.S. Post Office, October 2024

- Location within New York Location within the United States
- Interactive map showing the location for U.S. Post Office-Newark
- Location: 300 S. Main St., Newark, New York
- Coordinates: 43°2′37″N 77°5′43″W
- Area: less than one acre
- Built: 1911
- Architect: James Knox Taylor
- Architectural style: Classical Revival
- MPS: US Post Offices in New York State, 1858–1943, TR
- NRHP reference No.: 88002366
- Added to NRHP: May 11, 1989

US Post Office-Newark is an historic post office building located at Newark in Wayne County, New York. It was designed and built in 1911–1913 and is one of a number of post offices in New York State designed by the Office of the Supervising Architect of the Treasury Department, James Knox Taylor. The original, main block is a 1-story, five-by-three-bay building clad in stucco and executed in the Classical Revival style. The large rear wing was added to the building in 1938–1939.

It was listed on the National Register of Historic Places in 1989.
