= Louisville Kentucky Temple =

Temple of the LDS Church

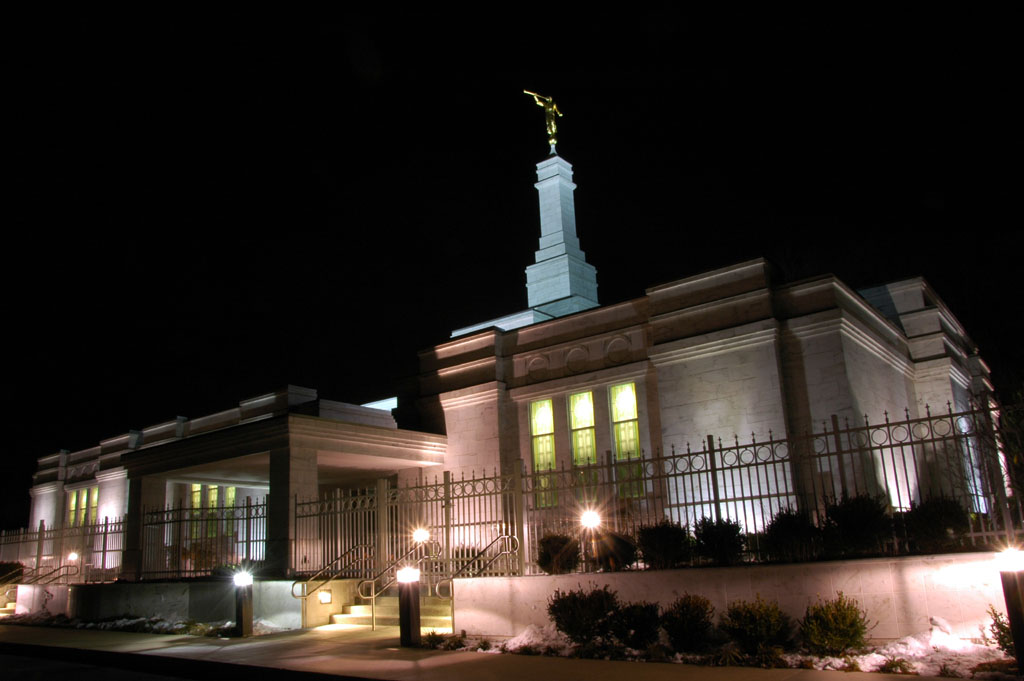
- Interactive map of Louisville Kentucky Temple
- Number: 76
- Dedication: March 19, 2000, by Thomas S. Monson
- Site: 3 acres (1.2 ha)
- Floor area: 10,700 ft^{2} (990 m^{2})
- Height: 71 ft (22 m)
- Official website • News & images

Church chronology
← Tuxtla Gutiérrez Mexico Temple	Louisville Kentucky Temple	→ Palmyra New York Temple

Additional information
- Announced: March 17, 1999, by Gordon B. Hinckley
- Groundbreaking: May 29, 1999, by John K. Carmack
- Open house: March 4–11, 2000
- Current president: Ronald Lynn Spjut
- Designed by: Firestone Jaros Mullin--Mike Karpinski Architect
- Location: Peewee Valley, Kentucky, United States
- Coordinates: 38°19′16.03200″N 85°29′19.83480″W
- Exterior finish: Imperial Danby White marble quarried in Vermont
- Design: Classic modern, single-spire design
- Baptistries: 1
- Ordinance rooms: 2 (two-stage progressive)
- Sealing rooms: 2

The Louisville Kentucky Temple is the 76th operating temple of the Church of Jesus Christ of Latter-day Saints (LDS Church). It is located in Pewee Valley, Kentucky with a mailing address of Crestwood, Kentucky. The adjacent communities are suburbs of Louisville. The intent to build the temple was announced on March 17, 1999, by the First Presidency in a letter to local church leaders. The temple is the church's first in Kentucky.

The temple has a single attached spire with a statue of the angel Moroni. This temple was designed by Mike Karpinski of the firm Firestone Jaros Mullin, using a traditional architectural style. A groundbreaking ceremony, to signify the beginning of construction, was held on May 29, 1999, conducted by John K. Carmack, a church general authority.

== History ==
The Louisville Kentucky Temple was announced on March 27, 1999. A groundbreaking ceremony on May 29, 1999, marked the beginning of construction, with John K. Carmack presiding and local church members and community leaders in attendance. After construction was completed, a weeklong public open house was held March 4–11, 2000. Thomas S. Monson, of the church's First Presidency, dedicated the temple on March 19, 2000.

In 2020, like all the church's others, the Louisville Kentucky Temple was closed for a time in response to the COVID-19 pandemic.

== Design and architecture ==
The temple is on a 3-acre forested plot. The building was designed by Mike Karpinski using traditional Latter-day Saint elements to also reflect both the cultural heritage of the Louisville region and its spiritual significance to the church. It has the same design as other small temples built during the same time period, with a total floor area of 10,700 square feet (990 m2).

The structure was constructed with Danby Vermont marble, and has two ordinance rooms, two sealing rooms, and a baptistry, each designe for ceremonial use.

The design uses elements representing Latter-day Saint symbolism, to provide deeper spiritual meaning to its appearance and function. Symbolism is important to church members and include the angel Moroni statue on the steeple, representing “the restoration of the gospel of Jesus Christ.”

== Temple presidents ==
The church's temples are directed by a temple president and matron, each generally serving for a term of three years. The president and matron oversee the administration of temple operations and provide guidance and training for both temple patrons and staff.

Serving from 2000 to 2004, the first president of the Louisville Kentucky Temple was James W. Hansen, with Karen L. Hansen as matron. As of 2025, Michael A. Gillenwater is the president, with Alexene L. Gillenwater serving as matron.

== Admittance ==
Following completion of construction, the church held a public open house March 4–11, 2000, which approximately 21,000 people attended. The temple was dedicated by Thomas S. Monson on March 19, 2000, in four sessions.

Like all the church's temples, it is not used for Sunday worship services. To members of the church, temples are regarded as sacred houses of the Lord. Once dedicated, only church members with a current temple recommend can enter for worship.

== See also ==
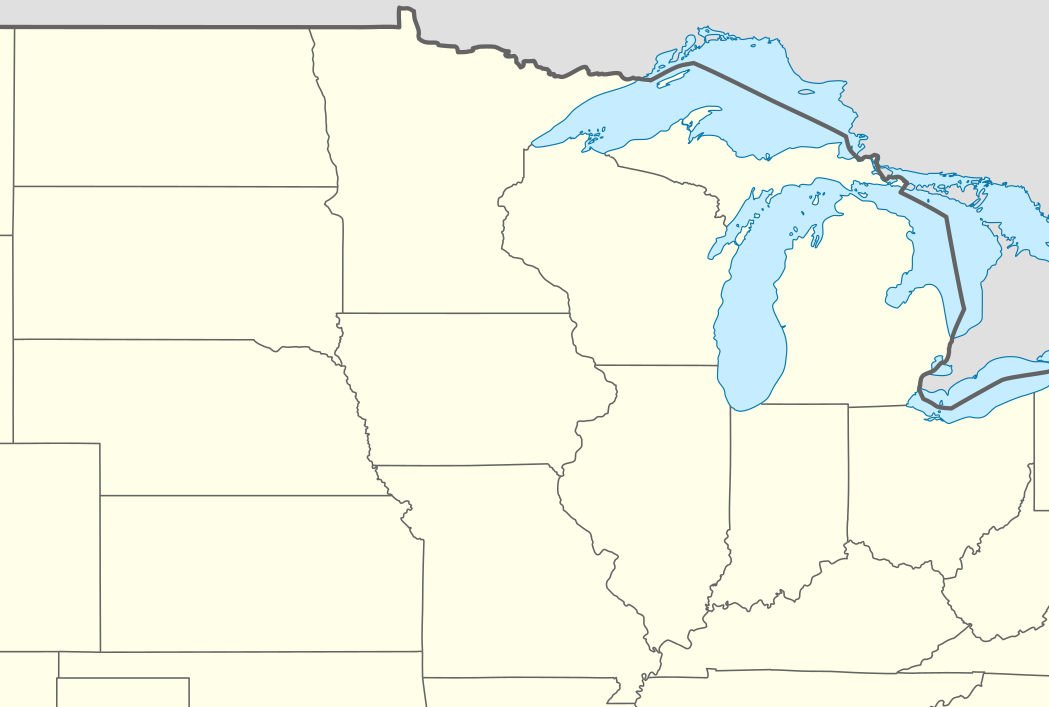
Temples in the United States Midwest
- = Operating
- = Under construction
- = Announced
- = Closed for renovation
- Comparison of temples of The Church of Jesus Christ of Latter-day Saints
- List of temples of The Church of Jesus Christ of Latter-day Saints
- List of temples of The Church of Jesus Christ of Latter-day Saints by geographic region
- Temple architecture (Latter-day Saints)
- The Church of Jesus Christ of Latter-day Saints in Kentucky
- Religion in Louisville, Kentucky

== Additional reading ==
- "Six temple dates announced", Church News, February 12, 2000
- "United States information: Kentucky", Church News, February 2, 2010
