= John K. Carmack =

LDS Church General Authority

First Quorum of the Seventy
- April 7, 1984 – October 6, 2001
- Called by: Spencer W. Kimball
- End reason: Granted general authority emeritus status

Emeritus General Authority
- October 6, 2001
- Called by: Gordon B. Hinckley

Personal details
- Born: John Kay Carmack; May 10, 1931 (age 93); Winslow, Arizona, U.S.

John Kay Carmack (born May 10, 1931) has been a general authority of the Church of Jesus Christ of Latter-day Saints (LDS Church) since 1984. He is currently an emeritus general authority and was the managing director of the church's Perpetual Education Fund (PEF) from 2001 to 2012.

== Biographical background ==
Carmack was born in Winslow, Arizona. After attending Brigham Young University (BYU) for two years, Carmack served as an LDS Church missionary in the Western Central States Mission. After returning home, he completed an arts degree at BYU and went on to obtain a law degree at the University of California at Los Angeles. Carmack joined a law firm in Los Angeles, eventually becoming the firm's president. Carmack also served briefly in the United States military in Korea.

Carmack is married to Shirley Fay Allen and they are the parents of six children.

In the LDS Church, Carmack has served in a variety of callings, including as president of the Los Angeles California Stake and as a regional representative. In 1981, Carmack was appointed as president of the Idaho Boise Mission.

== General authority ==
In 1984, Carmack became a member of the First Quorum of the Seventy. In 1989, he became executive director of the church's Historical Department. As a general authority, Carmack performed the groundbreaking for four LDS Church temples: Hong Kong China, Louisville Kentucky, Nashville Tennessee, and The Hague Netherlands.

In 2001, Carmack was given emeritus status and released from his duties as a seventy. However, church president Gordon B. Hinckley immediately asked Carmack to become the first managing director of the church's new PEF. He served in this position until 2012, when he was succeeded by Robert C. Gay.

Carmack was very active in publicizing PEF and related efforts. On one occasion he suggested that future church general conferences may be held outside the US.

== Publications ==
- John K. Carmack (2004). A Bright Ray of Hope: The Perpetual Education Fund (Salt Lake City, Utah: Deseret Book) ISBN 1-59038-234-X
- —— (1993). Tolerance: Principles, Practices, Obstacles, Limits (Salt Lake City, Utah: Bookcraft) ISBN 0-88494-890-0
- ——, "Unmeasured Factors of Success" in Galen L. Fletcher & Jane H. Wise (eds.) (2002). Life in the Law: Answering God's Interrogatories (Provo, Utah: BYU Press) ISBN 0-8425-2512-2

Carmack has also written articles for BYU Studies and the Mormon Historical Sites foundation on the 19th-century era of the history of the LDS Church.
