= Rose Hum Lee =

American sociologist

- Born: August 20, 1904
- Died: March 25, 1964 (aged 59); Phoenix, Arizona
- Education: Carnegie Institute of Technology; University of Chicago
- Occupation: Professor of sociology
- Known for: First Chinese-American university chair

Rose Hum Lee (August 20, 1904 – March 25, 1964) was a first generation Chinese-American who became the first woman and the first Chinese-American to head a United States university sociology department.

== Biography ==
Daughter of Hum Wong Long and Lin Fong, Hum was born the second of seven children and raised in Butte, Montana. She attended Butte High School and trained to become a secretary.

While working in Philadelphia Hum met and married to Ku Young Lee, a Chinese national who was in the US pursuing an engineering degree from the University of Pennsylvania. After their marriage they moved to Canton, China with the intention of working for the new republican government there. She remained there until their divorce in 1939.

During the Japanese invasion of China in 1937, Rose organized emergency social services for displaced widows and children. In the process, she adopted one of the children, Elaine, as her own, and brought her to the U.S. just before World War II began.

She earned her B.S. in social work from the Carnegie Institute of Technology in Pittsburgh, financing her degree with "lectures and freelance writing about the situation in China." She completed her doctorate at the University of Chicago in 1947 with her thesis titled, The Growth and Decline of Chinese Communities in the Rocky Mountain Region. It was during these years that she authored two plays for children, one of which was produced by Goodman Theatre in Chicago.

Rose gained a teaching position in sociology at the newly formed Roosevelt University in Chicago. In 1956, she was named head of the sociology department, and she was promoted to full professor three years later.

In 1951, she married Glenn Ginn, a Chinese-American lawyer from Phoenix and in 1961 they moved to Arizona. On March 25, 1964, she died of a stroke in Phoenix.

== Publications ==
- The Growth and Decline of Chinese Communities in the Rocky Mountain Region (Dissertation 1947; published 1978)
- The Chinese in the United States of America (1960)
