= Wayne County Fairgrounds =

Multi-purpose venue in Palmyra, New York, United States

- Interactive map of Wayne County Fairgrounds
- Location: Palmyra, New York
- Coordinates: 43.0577°N 77.2382°W
- Owner: Palmyra Union Agricultural Society,

The Wayne County Fairgrounds is the home of the annual Wayne County Fair. Open for over 160 years, the fairgrounds are utilized year-round and host a number of events. The facility is located in the Village of Palmyra, New York.

== Facilities and events ==
=== Wayne County Fair ===
In 1856, seventeen men organized themselves as the Palmyra Union Agricultural Society, a stock company, and held a three-day fair that October. The original 18 or more acres of the Fairgrounds was leased to hold the annual fair, and the property was later purchased. As part of a 1962 reorganization, the Palmyra Fair was renamed as the Wayne County Fair and became the official fair of the County. In 2025, New York State Governor Kathy Hochul visited the Fair on its opening day.

The annual fair brings rides, food, live music and myriad attractions to the region for seven days. Entertainment choices include harness racing, tractor pull, figure 8 racing, demolition derbies, beat the beast bull riders tour rodeo, and garden tractor pulls.

=== Exhibition Hall ===
Floral Hall has been in continuous use at the fairgrounds since 1856. It was included on the National Register of Historic Places in 2009 as part of the Palmyra Village Historic District.

=== Harvest on the Canal ===
In addition to entertainment, the festival features vendors offering specialty foods and crafts, along with activities such as an art show, a pancake breakfast, sunrise service, farmers market, chicken barbecue, horse parade and a car show.

=== Auto racing ===
Auto racing was introduced to the half-mile Palmyra Fairgrounds horse track in the 1920s, and returned in 1948 when the Speed Corporation of America sanctioned stock car racing on the oval. The Interstate Auto Racing Club staged the final auto races held at the fairgrounds in 1950. Area auto racing was soon resumed at the Palmyra Speedway, a quarter-mile racetrack built two miles east of Palmyra village.
