= East Palmyra, New York =

Hamlet in New York, United States

Coordinates: 43°05′06″N 77°09′25″W

East Palmyra is a hamlet in the Town of Palmyra, Wayne County, New York, United States near the Arcadia town line. It is located five miles (8 km) northeast of the Village of Palmyra and 5 miles (8 km) northwest of the Village of Newark, at an elevation of 443 feet (135 m). The primary cross roads where the hamlet is located are Tellier Road (CR 225), South Creek Road and East Palmyra-Port Gibson Road.

A United States Post Office was located in East Palmyra with a ZIP Code of 14444. It permanently closed on September 20, 1997. East Palmyra is home to the East Palmyra Christian School, a private, Christian school that serves pre-school through 12th grade.

The East Palmyra Presbyterian Church was listed on the National Register of Historic Places in 2002.
