= Early participants in the Latter Day Saint movement =

Early participants in the Latter Day Saint movement consist of those individuals who were involved in Joseph Smith's Latter Day Saint movement prior to Smith's departure for Ohio in January 1831. Early participants also included the Three Witnesses and the Eight Witnesses to the Book of Mormon and members of the extended Whitmer and Smith families. Other early members included friends and acquaintances of the Smith and Whitmer families, such as Orrin Porter Rockwell.

== Official first members ==
According to what is now known as the Church of Jesus Christ of Latter-day Saints (LDS Church), the first six members of the church were:

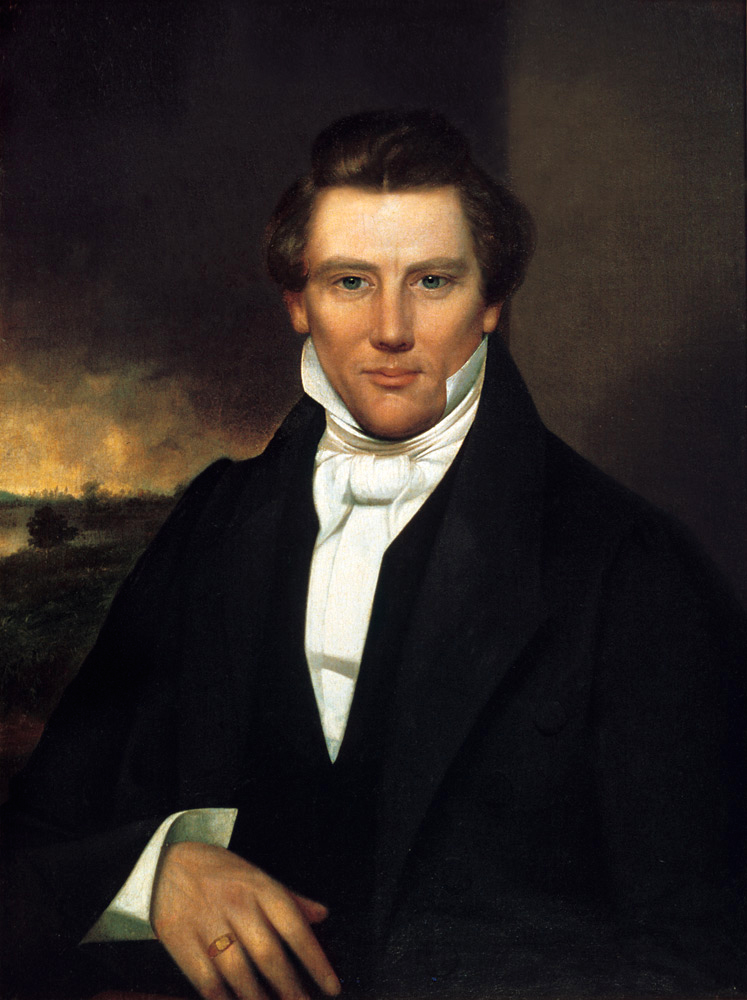
Joseph Smith

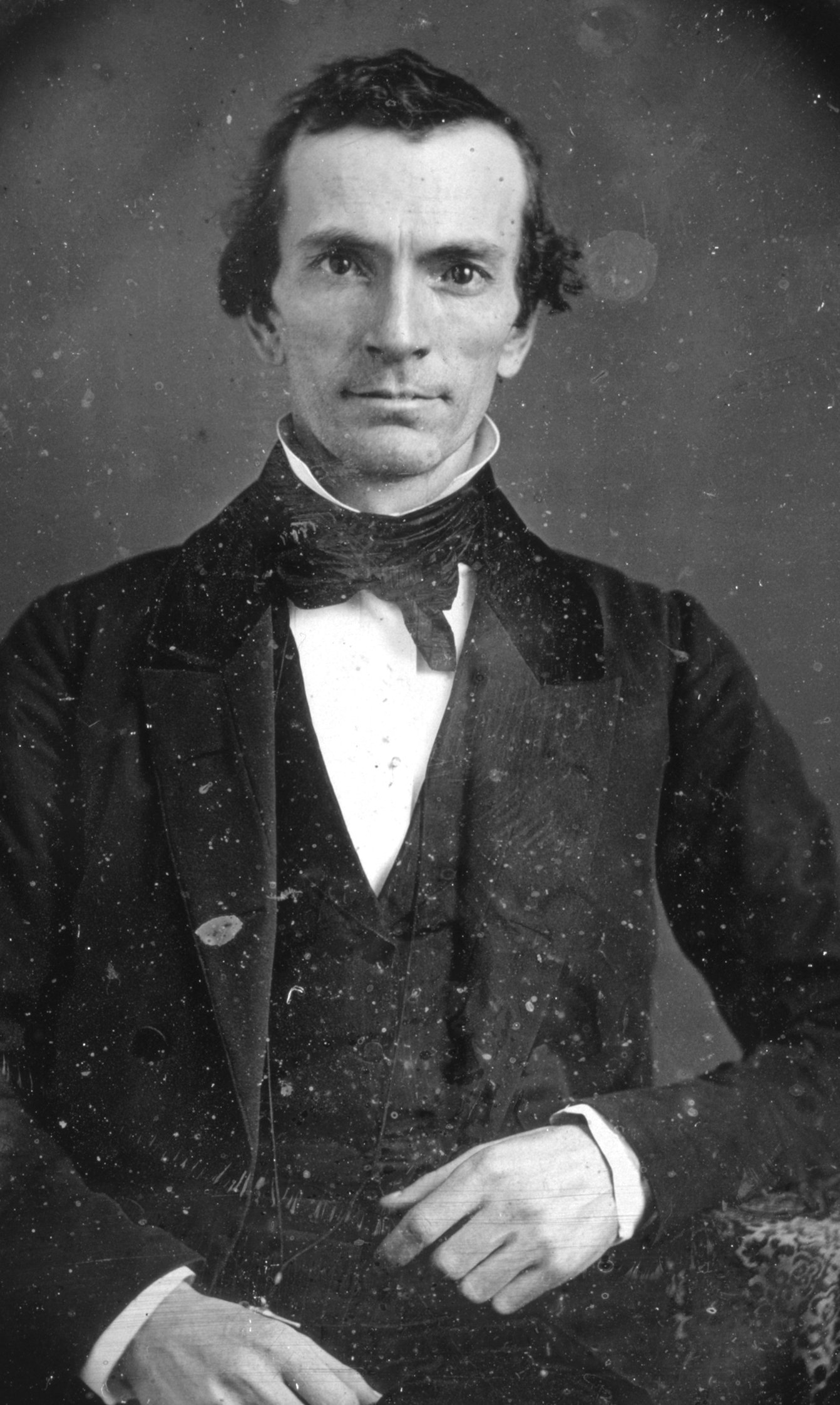
Oliver Cowdery

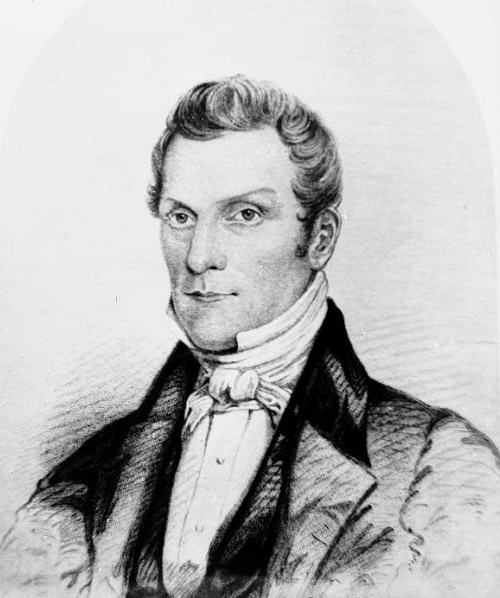
Hyrum Smith

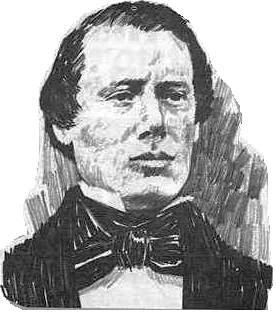
Samuel H. Smith

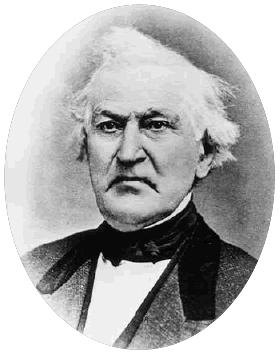
David Whitmer

Not shown: Peter Whitmer, Jr.
- Joseph Smith
- Oliver Cowdery
- Hyrum Smith
- Peter Whitmer, Jr.
- Samuel H. Smith
- David Whitmer

== Early participants ==
Early membership also included the remainder of the Smith family of Manchester: Joseph Smith, Sr., Lucy Mack Smith, Calvin Stoddard and wife Sophronia Smith Stoddard, William Smith, Katharine Smith, Don Carlos Smith, and Lucy Smith.

John Whitmer was baptized into the movement as early as June 1829, nearly a year prior to the formal organization of the Church. The Whitmer family and their spouses who were early members included: Hiram Page and his wife Catherine Whitmer Page, Jacob Whitmer and his wife Elizabeth Schott Whitmer, Christian Whitmer and his wife Anne Schott Whitmer, Elizabeth Ann Whitmer, Peter Whitmer, Sr. and his wife Mary Musselman Whitmer.

Early members from the Rockwell family include Sarah Witt Rockwell and her children Orrin Porter Rockwell, Caroline, Electa and Peter. Members from the Jolly family included Elizabeth, Vincent, William, Harriet, John and Julia Ann Jolly.

Solomon Chamberlain wrote in his 1858 autobiography that he was baptized shortly after the organization of the church.

Ziba Peterson was baptized on April 18. Ezra Thayre was baptized on October 10, 1830.

Preserved Harris, Martin Harris's brother.

== Milestones ==
The Latter Day Saint movement experienced major milestones at its organizations, its conference, and its relocation to Ohio.

=== Organization of April 6, 1830 ===
On April 6, 1830, Joseph Smith Jr., Oliver Cowdery, and a group of approximately 50 believers met to formally organize the Church of Christ into a legal institution.

=== First conference of June 9, 1830 ===
The new church's first conference was held on June 9, 1830, in Fayette, N.Y., with 27 members.

=== Departure to Kirtland ===
In January 1831, Joseph Smith traveled to Kirtland, Ohio.

== Table of baptisms ==
According to one scholar, the first known baptisms include:

| Name | Date of baptism | Comments |
|---|---|---|
| Joseph Smith Jr. | May 15, 1829 | |
| Oliver Cowdery | May 15, 1829 | |
| Samuel H. Smith | May 24, 1829 | |
| Hyrum Smith | June 1829 | |
| Joseph Smith Sr. | April 6, 1830 | |
| Lucy Mack Smith | April 6, 1830 | |
| Martin Harris | April 6, 1830 | |
| David Whitmer | June 1829 & April 6, 1830 | |
| Peter Whitmer Jr. | June 1829 | |
| Orrin Porter Rockwell | April 6, 1830 | |
| Sarah Witt Rockwell | April 6, 1830 | |
| Solomon Chamberlain | "a few days" after April 6, 1830 | |
