= List of bodyguards =

List of notable bodyguards

This is a list of notable bodyguards.

== Former military ==
=== United Kingdom ===
- Duncan Falconer – author and security consultant
- Trevor Rees-Jones – former bodyguard for Dodi Al-Fayed
- Chris Ryan – author and security consultant
- Jacquie Davis – author and female bodyguard

== Former police and security agencies ==
=== France ===
- Yassine Cheuko - bodyguard of Lionel Messi

=== Russia ===
- Viktor Zolotov – former FSO RF bodyguard, Commander-in-chief of the Internal Troops of the Ministry of Internal Affairs of the Russian Federation

=== Ukraine ===
- Mykola Melnychenko – Former SBU officer

=== United Kingdom ===
- James Wallace Beaton – Former Royalty Protection Group officer
- Barry Mannakee – Former Royalty Protection Group officer
- Walter H. Thompson (1890–1978) – bodyguard of Winston Churchill (1921–1945)

=== United States ===
- Clint Hill – former bodyguard for First Lady Jacqueline Kennedy during the Kennedy assassination in Dallas, 1963.
- Timothy J. McCarthy – former bodyguard for Ronald Reagan.
- James Hamilton - Former FBI Special Agent and Personal Security Expert

== Civilians ==
=== Ireland ===
- Fran Cosgrave – former bodyguard for Westlife

=== United States ===
- Chris Boykin – bodyguard on the TV show Rob and Big
- Michael Clarke Duncan – actor
- Mr. T – actor
- Brodus Clay – professional wrestler, best known for his time with WWE, bodyguard for Snoop Dogg
- Shad Gaspard – professional wrestler, best known for his time with WWE
- Sheamus – professional wrestler, best known for his time with WWE, bodyguard for U2 and Bono
- Stan Love – professional basketball player, bodyguard for Brian Wilson
- Denida Grow – female bodyguard, founder of Athena Worldwide and Nannyguards

== Historic ==
- Satwant Singh and Beant Singh – Bodyguards who assassinated Indian Prime Minister Indira Gandhi.
- Sempronius Densus – bodyguard of Piso Licinianus, deputy Roman emperor
- Dian Wei – bodyguard of the warlord Cao Cao
- Porter Rockwell – bodyguard of Joseph Smith Jr.
