= Porter Rockwell =

United States Marshal; Latter-day Saint

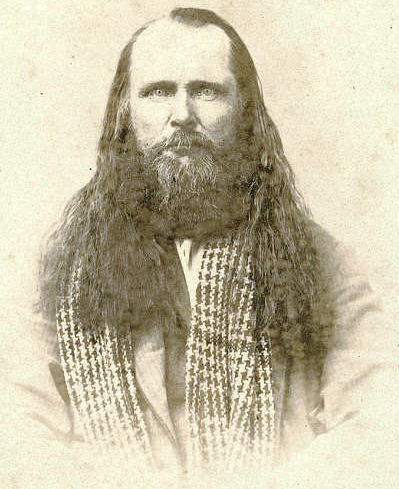

Members of the Council of Fifty
- March 19, 1844 – June 9, 1878
- Called by: Joseph Smith

Personal details
- Born: Orrin Porter Rockwell c. June 28, 1813; Belchertown, Hampshire County, Massachusetts, United States
- Died: June 9, 1878 (aged 64); Salt Lake City, Utah Territory, United States
- Resting place: Salt Lake City Cemetery; 40.776°N 111.862°W
- Known For: Personal bodyguard to Joseph Smith and Brigham Young, Deputy US Marshal; Known as "The Destroying Angel of Mormondom" and "Modern-day Samson"
- Occupation: businessman, bodyguard, lawman, frontiersman, scout
- Spouse(s): Mary Ann Neff (1854); Christina Olsen; Luana Hart Beebe
- Children: At least 7
- Parents: Orin and Sarah Rockwell

Orrin Porter Rockwell (June 28, 1813 or June 25, 1815 – June 9, 1878) was an American bodyguard and Mormon figure of the Wild West period of American history. A lawman in the Utah Territory, he was nicknamed Old Port, The Destroying Angel of Mormondom and Modern-day Samson.

Rockwell served as a bodyguard, and was a personal friend, of Latter Day Saint movement founder Joseph Smith. After Smith's death in 1844, Rockwell became a bodyguard of his successor, Brigham Young, and traveled with him and members of the Church of Jesus Christ of Latter-day Saints (LDS Church) to the Salt Lake Valley in the present-day U.S. state of Utah.

== Early years ==
Rockwell was born in what was known as the "Dark Corner" section of Belchertown, Hampshire County, Massachusetts, to Orin and Sarah Witt Rockwell, on June 25, 1813. Orin Rockwell came from Tolland, Connecticut, arriving in Belchertown by 1809, where he married Sarah Witt who was born there. Both were swept up in the religious fervor of the Second Great Awakening.

At age 4, in about 1817, Rockwell moved with his family to western New York's Burned-over district, to Manchester and Palmyra. They became neighbors of the Smith family, who had moved there from Vermont the year before.

Rockwell was said to be related to Joseph Smith through a "jumble of ancestral lines" through his paternal grandmother, Irene Porter, who descended from John Porter and Ann White, "progenitors of the Mormon prophet."

Rockwell was eight years younger than Smith. While Smith was publishing the Book of Mormon, Rockwell picked berries at night and hauled wood into town to help pay for the publishing.

In 1830, at 16 years old, Rockwell was baptized into Smith's Church of Christ in Fayette, New York. Rockwell's baptism was long held to have occurred on April 6, the day the church was organized, but original documents suggest a probable date of June 9. Rockwell was the youngest member of the first group to be baptized into the church.

On February 2, 1832, Rockwell married Luana Beebe in Jackson County, Missouri, and was endowed in the Nauvoo Temple on January 5, 1846.

Rockwell killed many men as a gunfighter, a religious enforcer, and Deputy United States Marshal. According to legend, Rockwell told a crowd listening to United States vice president Schuyler Colfax in 1869, "I never killed anyone who didn't need killing", a quote used by actor John Wayne in a movie decades later.

In 1870, Fitz Hugh Ludlow recorded "he [Porter Rockwell] was that most terrible instrument that can be handled by fanaticism; a powerful physical nature welded to a mind of very narrow perceptions, intense convictions, and changeless tenacity. In his build, he was a gladiator; in his humor, a Yankee lumberman; in his memory, a Bourbon; in his vengeance, an Indian. A strange mixture, only to be found on the American Continent.

== Boggs attempted assassination accusation ==
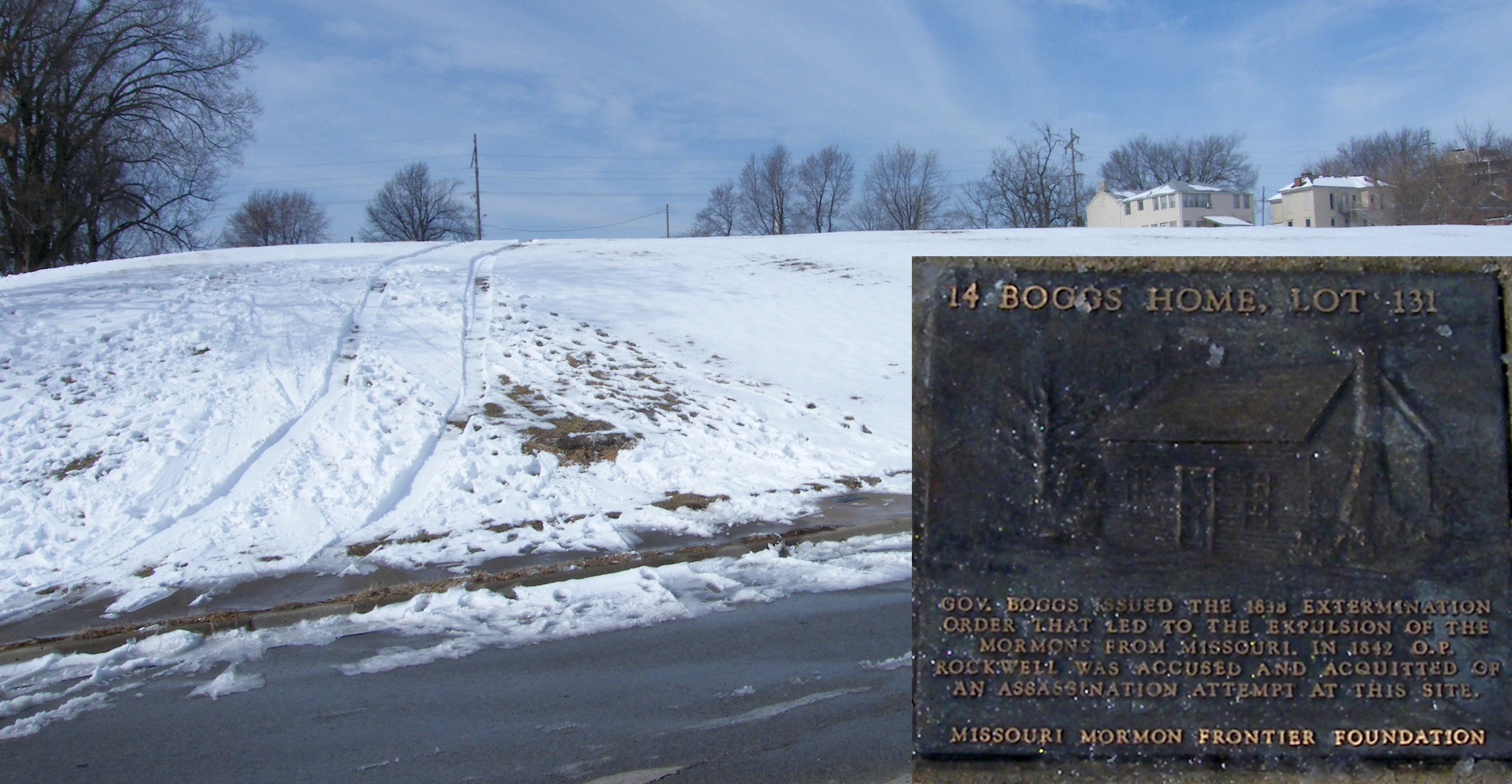
Marker on the Mormon Walking Tour in Independence commemorating the house where Rockwell was accused of shooting Missouri Governor Lilburn Boggs Boggs, from Independence, moved to the house on the original City of Zion plot after he left office and the Mormons were evicted from their homes and lands in Missouri by his Missouri Executive Order 44. Rockwell was exonerated of all charges related to the attempted murder of Boggs. The steeple of the Independence Temple by the Temple Lot is visible in the trees at the top of the hill.

On the evening of May 6, 1842, Lilburn Boggs was shot by an unknown party who fired at him through a window as he read a newspaper in his study. He was badly wounded but survived. Boggs was the governor of Missouri who had signed the Executive Order 44 on October 27, 1838, known as the "Extermination Order" evicting Mormons from Missouri by violent and deadly means.

The Sangamo Journal published a letter by John C. Bennett, a recently excommunicated Mormon who, prior to the assassination, had served as mayor of Nauvoo, Major General of the Nauvoo Legion, and Chancellor of the University of Nauvoo.

Bennett implicated Rockwell in the assassination attempt, writing:

"In 1841, Joe Smith predicted or prophesied in a public congregation in Nauvoo, that Lilburn W Boggs, ex-Governor of Missouri, should die by violent hands within one year. From one or two months prior to the attempted assassination of Gov. Boggs, Mr. O. P. Rockwell left Nauvoo for parts unknown to the citizens at large. I was then on terms of close intimacy with Joe Smith, and asked him where Rockwell had gone? "Gone," said he, "GONE TO FULFILL PROPHECY!" Rockwell returned to Nauvoo the day before the report of the assassination reached there."

Smith and his supporters vehemently denied Bennett's account.

Rockwell was apprehended in St. Louis on March 6, 1843. In late May, Rockwell briefly escaped from the Independence jail where he was being held.

On September 30, 1843, it was reported:

"Orin Porter Rockwell, the Mormon confined in our county jail some time since for the attempted assassination of ex-governor Boggs, was indicted by our last grand jury for escaping from the county jail some weeks since, and sent to Clay county for trial. Owing, however, to some informality in the proceedings, he was remanded to this county again for trial. There was not sufficient proof adduced against him to justify an indictment for shooting ex-Governor Boggs; and the grand jury, therefore, did not indict him for that offence."

Though never indicted for the attempted assassination, Rockwell was tried and convicted of jailbreak. Rockwell was released on December 13, 1843—nine months after his arrest.

== Utah years ==
The morning of September 16, 1845, Lieutenant Frank Worrell of the nearby Carthage militia was shot and killed by Rockwell after refusing an order to stop by non-Mormon Sheriff William Backenstos. Worrell had been the sergeant of the guard at Carthage when the Smiths were assassinated.

Following Smith's death, Rockwell followed Brigham Young and the LDS Church to the Salt Lake Valley. In 1849, Rockwell was appointed as deputy marshal of Great Salt Lake City, and remained a peace officer until his death. He was well known for his endurance, loyalty, and relentlessness.

On April 21st 1851, a group of Goshute confiscated some horses that had invaded their territory near Benson Grist Mill. General Daniel H. Wells sent a posse led by Rockwell to pursue the Goshute. They lost the trail of the Goshute that had taken the horses and encountered another group of 20 or 30 people belonging to the Ute tribe, whom they took prisoner but did not disarm. When some of the captured Goshute tried to escape, one was shot by Custer, a non-Mormon member of the posse. Custer was then shot by one of the Native Americans, who was in turn shot by another posse member. All but four or five prisoners escaped; those that didn't escape were executed by Rockwell on April 22nd.

Rockwell operated the Hot Springs Hotel and Brewery at the southern end of the Salt Lake Valley, in an area known as "Point of the Mountain".

Rockwell's fame as a "mountain man" attracted the explorer, Richard Francis Burton. In 1860, on his trip across America to the west coast, Burton stopped to explore the Salt Lake City area. He stayed with Lysander Dayton in a village near the city, and Dayton invited Rockwell to dinner. Rockwell sent for a bottle of Valley Tan Whiskey, and he and Burton drank shot-for-shot into the night, with Rockwell outlining steps Burton should take for safety during his passage to Sacramento. Rockwell advised Burton to carry a loaded double-barreled shotgun, sleep in a "dark camp" (unlit, miles from where supper was cooked), to never trust appearances, and to avoid the main trail, where "White Indians" (so-called because they were white robbers disguised as Indians to avert blame) preyed on travelers. In 1857 Rockwell participated in the Aiken massacre, which was a murder of several Californian travelers.

== Death ==
Rockwell died in Salt Lake City, Utah Territory, of natural causes on June 9, 1878. He was buried in the Salt Lake City Cemetery. At the time of his death, Rockwell had been a baptized Latter-day Saint longer than anyone living. His epitaph reads:

He was brave and loyal to his faith. True to the Prophet Joseph Smith. A promise made him by the prophet. Through obedience, it was fulfilled.

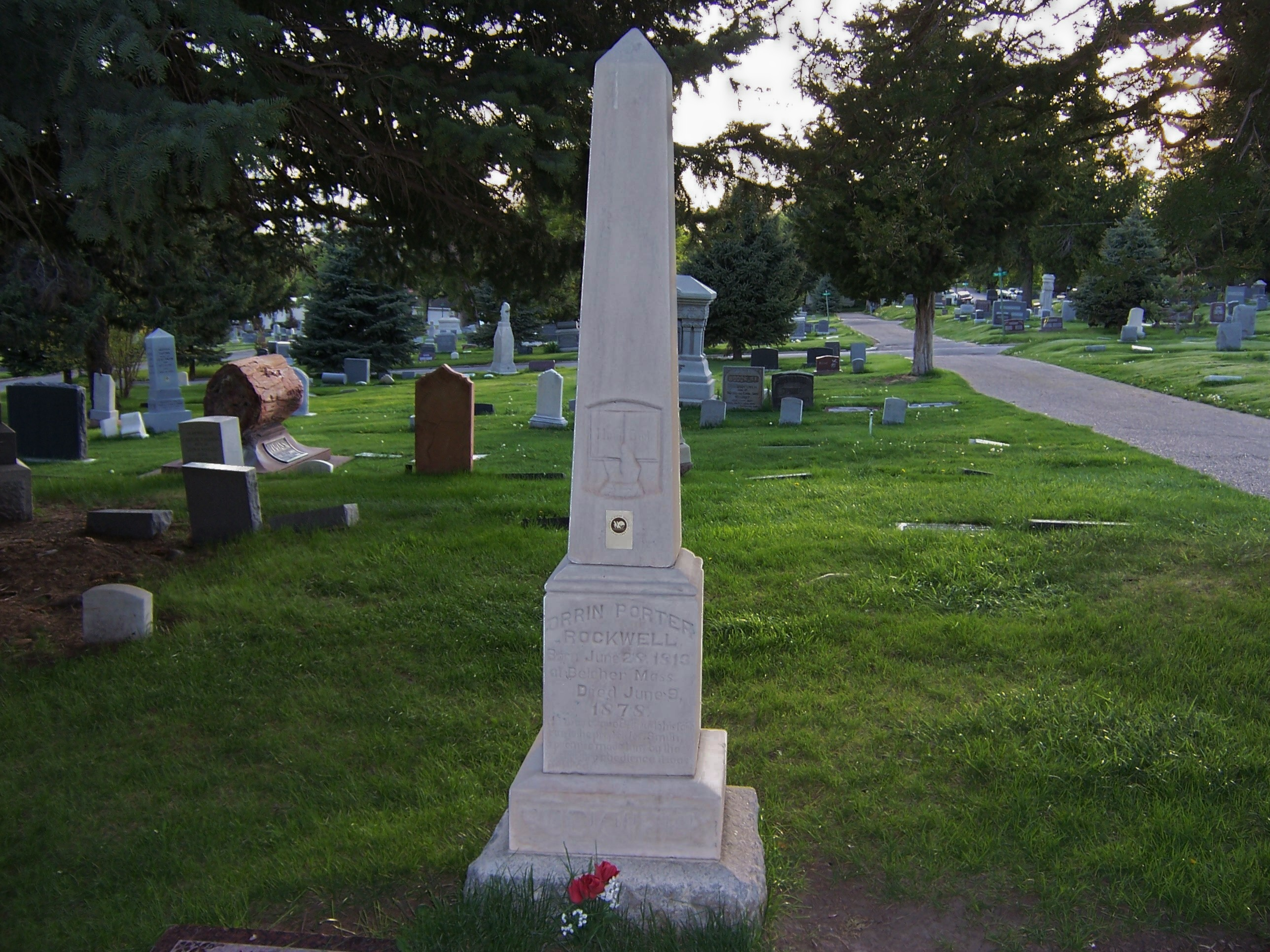
Grave marker of Orrin Porter Rockwell in Salt Lake City Cemetery

At Rockwell's funeral, which was held at the Salt Lake City 14th Ward school house, apostle Joseph F. Smith, nephew of Joseph Smith and future church president, spoke the following about Rockwell:

They say he was a murderer; if he was, he was the friend of Joseph Smith and Brigham Young, and he was faithful to them, and to his covenants, and he has gone to Heaven and apostates can go to Hell ... Porter Rockwell was yesterday afternoon ushered into Heaven clothed with immortality and eternal life, and crowned with all glory which belongs to a departed saint. He has his little faults, but Porter's life on earth, taken altogether, was one worthy of example, and reflected honor upon the church. Through all his trials, he never once forgot his obligations to his brethren and his God.

However, not all reactions to Rockwell's death were positive. On June 11, 1878, the Salt Lake Tribune stated, "Porter Rockwell is another of the long list of Mormon criminals whose deeds of treachery and blood have reddened the soil of Utah, and who has paid no forfeit to offended law."

== Legacy ==
Rockwell fathered 21 children with three different wives. He had the distinction of being the subject of a direct prophecy by Smith. After spending eight months in jail on charges of attempting to assassinate Boggs, Rockwell traveled to Nauvoo, appearing unannounced at a Christmas party at Smith's home. After his identity was confirmed, Smith was moved to say:

I prophesy, in the name of the Lord, you—Orrin Porter Rockwell—so long as ye shall remain loyal and true to thy faith, need fear no enemy. Cut not thy hair, and no bullet or blade can harm thee.

The promise echoes one given by an angel to the parents of the biblical Samson.

Rockwell, at one time, cut his hair. After hearing of a balding widow with typhoid fever, he offered his famous long hair to make a wig. The recipient of the hair was Agnes Coolbrith Smith Pickett, widow of Smith's brother, Don Carlos.

The Porter Rockwell Trail is a walking trail that spans Lehi, Draper, White City, and Sandy.

== Cultural influence ==
Two statues of Rockwell exist: one near the old site of his Hot Springs Hotel and Brewery near the Utah State Penitentiary, the other in Lehi, Utah, off of Main Street behind.

In 1971, the restaurant "Porter's Place" was opened on Lehi Main Street but later in 2018, it moved to Eureka, Utah, and eventually closed permanently.

Three comprehensive biographies have been written about Rockwell. Orrin Porter Rockwell: Man of God, Son of Thunder by Harold Schindler, Porter Rockwell: A Biography by Richard Lloyd Dewey, and Stories from the Life of Porter Rockwell by John Rockwell.

== See also ==
- Bear River Massacre – 1863 massacre of Shoshone by U.S. military
- Alexander William Doniphan – American attorney, soldier and politician (1808–1887)
- Chauncey Millard – American outlaw (1851–1869)
- Hawken rifle – Muzzle-loading rifle
- Ironport (beverage) – Type of beverage
- Liberty Jail – Historic jail in Missouri, U.S.
- List of bodyguards – List of notable bodyguards
- List of Old West gunfighters
- List of Old West lawmen
- Mormon folklore – Folklore surrounding Mormon tradition
- Perry, Utah – City in Utah, United States
- Pioneer Village (Utah) – Museum in Farmington, Utah
- This Is the Place Monument – Monument in Salt Lake City, Utah, US
- Lauritz Smith – Danish Mormon pioneer (1830–1924)
- Lot Smith – American Mormon pioneer (1830–1892)
- Utah War – Armed conflict in the Utah Territory in 1857–1858
