= Palmyra-Macedon High School =

Location
- 151 Hyde Pkwy; Palmyra, New York 14522; United States; 43.058°N 77.246°W

Information
- Type: Public
- Established: 1950
- School district: Palmyra-Macedon Central School District
- NCES School ID: 362238003153
- Principal: Andrew Wahl
- Teaching staff: 49.43 (on an FTE basis)
- Grades: 9-12
- Gender: Co-ed
- Enrollment: 567 (2023-2024)
- Student to teacher ratio: 11.47
- Campus: Rural
- Colors: Red and White
- Athletics conference: NYSPHSAA
- Sports: 25 varsity sports
- Mascot: Red Raiders
- Team name: Pal-Mac Raiders
- Yearbook: Zenobia
- Website: high.palmaccsd.org

Palmyra-Macedon High School, known as "Pal-Mac", is a public high school located on the border of Palmyra and Macedon, New York, United States. It is part of the Palmyra-Macedon Central School District which serves the towns of Palmyra and Macedon. The principal is Andrew Wahl. The school colors are red and white.

== Academics ==
Pal-Mac provides education for grades nine through twelve with classes administered by 50 full-time teachers. A wide variety of specialty classes are offered in arts, music, technology and business; as well as advanced placement and college dual-enrollment opportunities.

=== Music ===
The Pal-Mac Music department consists of one instrumental symphonic band, one jazz ensemble, and two vocal performance groups. The Select Choir is the highest level of chorus. Students who excel in vocal and musical ability may audition for a limited position in the Select Choir. The Select Choir has a history of high performance in NYSSMA Festivals. The school's Jazz Band is widely respected in the Rochester area and has performed at the Rochester International Jazz Festival since 2022.

=== Technology ===
The Pal-Mac Technology Department is a rapidly growing aspect of the school. The school offers several courses including Digital Imaging, Woodshop, Architecture, TV Broadcasting and Communications, as well as a Robotics course. Pal-Mac High is also a PLTW Certified Engineering school, first implementing the curriculum in 1999.

==== FIRST Robotics ====
The FIRST Robotics Competition team at Pal-Mac has participated in several regionals, and competed many times in the final rounds. The Robotics team at Pal-Mac is an extracurricular club that includes student programmers, mechanics, as well as several student-artists and web designers.

=== Advanced courses ===
Palmyra-Macedon High School offers a wide variety of Advanced Placement, International Baccalaureate, and dual enrollment courses. It also has the distinction of being an IB World School since 2002 and currently one of two high schools offering the IB Diploma Programme in Wayne County.

- Advanced Placement courses offer students a college level curriculum which can often be transferred as introductory credits in US universities. AP Courses that are offered include: American History, AB Calculus, BC Calculus, Biology, Physics, and World History.
- Pal-Mac also offers dual enrollment courses in conjunction with Finger Lakes Community College, Monroe Community College, State University of New York at Oneonta, and Rochester Institute of Technology.
- The IB Diploma Program provides an internationally accepted qualification for entry into higher education and is accepted at many universities worldwide. IB courses that are offered include: Biology, English Literature A1, French B, History, Mathematics, Psychology, Spanish B, Theory of Knowledge, and Visual Arts

=== National rankings ===
Newsweek and U.S. News & World Report have both recognized Palmyra-Macedon as one of the top public high schools in America.

Year	Newsweek Ranking	US News Rankings
2008	815	Not Ranked
2009	1503	Not Ranked
2010	1666	Not Ranked
2011	Not Ranked	Not Ranked
2012	Not Ranked	1672
2013	1794	Not Ranked
2014	Not Ranked	Not Ranked
2015	Not Ranked	Not Ranked

== Athletics ==
The Pal-Mac nickname is the Red Raiders, while the mascot is a red-tailed hawk. The school district changed their mascot to a hawk in 2017 because the previous mascot, a Native American, was deemed offensive by the mascot committee. The former mascot was the Red Devils until 1961.

Pal-Mac has a strong tradition of success in many of its varsity sports, especially basketball and wrestling, winning multiple New York State Championships. Other varsity sports offered include football, cheerleading, cross country, golf, soccer, swimming, volleyball, baseball, softball, lacrosse, tennis, and track and field. Pal-Mac offers 22 varsity sports in all, as well as many junior varsity and modified teams. All Pal-Mac teams participate in Section V of the New York State Public High School Athletic Association.

In 2005, the Pal-Mac boys basketball team won the Class B New York State Championship. It was the first state championship by a Pal-Mac sports team. Representative James T. Walsh honored the team, the leading scorer Anthony Hall, and the team coach Chip Tatro, in Congress.

=== State titles ===
Year	Sport
1992 (runner-up)	Boys Basketball
2005	Boys Basketball
2010	Wrestling
2011	Wrestling
