= Palmyra-Macedon Central School District =

School district in New York, United States

Location
- Palmyra and Macedon New York United States
- Coordinates: 43°3′45″N 77°13′54″W

District information
- Type: Public
- Motto: Learn. Grow. Contribute.
- Grades: K–12
- Established: 1950; 75 years ago
- Superintendent: Robert R. Ike
- Schools: 4
- Budget: $50,925,000 (2024–25)

Students and staff
- Students: 1,685 (2022-23)
- Teachers: 159 (2022-23)
- Athletic conference: Section V (NYSPHSAA)
- District mascot: Red Raiders
- Colors: Red and white

Other information
- Website: www.palmaccsd.org

The Palmyra-Macedon Central School District is a public school district in New York State that serves almost 1,700 students in the towns of Palmyra and Macedon in Wayne County.

The average class size is 17–23 students (high school), and 15-29 in lower grades.

Robert R. Ike is the Superintendent of Schools and Ralph Brongo is the Assistant Superintendent for Business. Bryan P. Brooks is the Assistant Superintendent for Instruction.

== Board of education ==
The Board of Education (BOE) consists of nine members who serve rotating three-year terms. Elections are held each May for board members and to vote on the school district budget.

As of June 2024, Laura Arrington is president of the Board.

== Schools ==
The district operates one elementary, one intermediate, one middle and one high school.

=== Elementary schools ===
- Palmyra-Macedon Primary School (Palmyra) (PK-2)
- Palmyra-Macedon Intermediate School (Macedon) (3-5)

=== Middle school ===
- Palmyra-Macedon Middle School (6-8)

=== High school ===
- Palmyra-Macedon High School (9-12)

== Performance ==
The district's 91% graduation rate exceeds the State Standard of 55%. Approximately 55% of students continue to post-secondary education; 30% of the class of 2023 enrolled in four-year colleges.
