= Solomon Chamberlin =

Solomon Chamberlin (July 30, 1788 – 1862) was the first person to evangelize the printed Book of Mormon. He preached from proof sheets during a tour among Baptists and Reformed Methodists in New York and Upper Canada while the Grandin press in Palmyra, New York, prepared volumes for publication. Prior to his encounter with the Book of Mormon, Chamberlin published his own visionary experience as A Sketch of the Experience of Solomon Chamberlin (1829).

Chamberlin traveled to what would become Utah in 1847 as part of the Brigham Young Vanguard Company.
