= Chauncey Millard =

American outlaw (1851–1869)

Chauncey W. Millard
- Born: 1850; New York, U.S.
- Died: January 29, 1869 (aged 18–19); Provo, Utah Territory, U.S.
- Other name: Candy Man
- Occupation: Freight driver
- Status: Executed by firing squad
- Conviction: First-degree murder
- Penalty: Death

Chauncey W. Millard (1850 – January 29, 1869) was an American outlaw in the Utah Territory convicted of murder. Executed at the age of 18, Millard remains the youngest person ever executed in Utah's history. Millard confessed to the 1868 killing of his coworker, Harlan Swett, following a dispute while freighting supplies. He gained historical notoriety for selling his body to a physician in exchange for candy, which he reportedly ate up until the moment of his execution by firing squad.

== Early life ==
Details of Millard's early life are primarily derived from his own accounts following his capture. He was born in New York in 1850. His mother placed him in a poorhouse at age six, where he remained until he was sent to work for a farmer named Babbitt. Millard claimed he was subjected to physical abuse by his employer, which led him to destroy Babbitt's property and run away at the age of 13. During the American Civil War, Millard allegedly lived as a bushwhacker, engaging in various robberies and murders. He later claimed to have killed five men before traveling west to Utah.

== Murder of Harlan Swett ==
In late 1868, Millard was hired by Champion Mayfield to assist in freighting supplies from Salt Lake City to Nevada. Another driver, Harlan Swett, accompanied them. On December 11, 1868, the group halted for lunch near Saratoga (present-day Saratoga Springs, Utah) at Pelican Point along the western shore of Utah Lake. After noticing his handgun was missing, Mayfield questioned Millard about the weapon. As Swett knelt to prepare food over a campfire, Millard produced the stolen revolver and shot Swett in the back of the head, killing him instantly.

Millard immediately turned the weapon on Mayfield, firing four shots. One bullet struck Mayfield in the hand, but he managed to escape by running across the frozen surface of Utah Lake. Millard reportedly expressed frustration at Mayfield's survival, later telling a reporter from the Salt Lake Daily Reporter that Mayfield must have "insured" his life because he had taken "good aim" during the encounter. Mayfield reached a settlement and alerted authorities, leading to a significant manhunt. Millard was apprehended four days later near Cedar Valley by a posse led by lawmen Orrin Porter Rockwell and Henry Heath.

== Execution and "Candy Man" legend ==
Millard was tried in Provo, where he readily confessed to the murder. He was sentenced to death by firing squad, the standard method of execution in the territory at the time. Lacking any family or friends to claim his remains, Millard entered into an agreement with a local physician, Dr. Don Carlos Roberts. Millard agreed to sell his body to Roberts for medical dissection and skeletal study in exchange for one pound of candy.

On the morning of January 29, 1869, Millard was led to his execution chair. He appeared indifferent to his fate, noting the snowy conditions and remarking that it had been snowing similarly on the day he killed Swett. Historical accounts and local legend maintain that Millard was still chewing on the candy he had purchased with his own body as the executioners fired. He was buried in a temporary grave before being exhumed by Dr. Roberts for his studies. However, Roberts' attempt to clean the bones using lye reportedly resulted in the destruction of most of the skeleton.

== Museum display ==
A small portion of Millard's remains survived Dr. Roberts' preservation attempt. According to local history, Roberts tanned a piece of Millard's skin and used it to wrap his medical instruments. This piece of skin, along with the revolver used in the murder of Harlan Swett, is currently on display at the John Hutchings Museum of Natural History in Lehi, Utah.
