= Zion Episcopal Church (Palmyra, New York) =

Historic church in New York, United States

- U.S. National Register of Historic Places
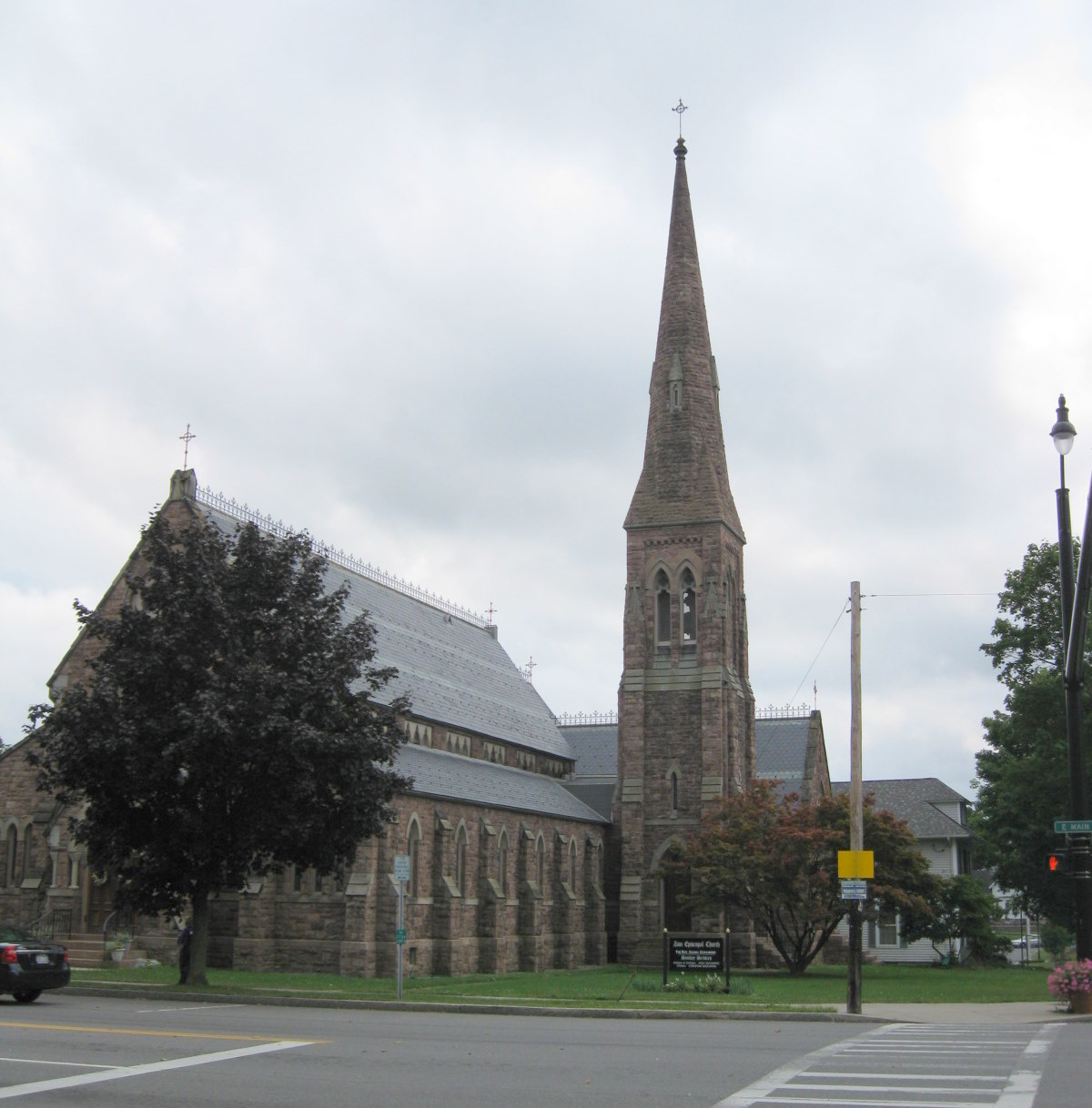
- Zion Episcopal Church, August 2009

- Location within New York Location within the United States
- Location: 100-120 Main St., Palmyra, New York
- Coordinates: 43°3′47″N 77°14′0″W
- Built: 1872
- Architect: Littell, Emlin T.
- Architectural style: Late Gothic Revival
- NRHP reference No.: 96001388
- Added to NRHP: November 29, 1996

Zion Episcopal Church is a historic Episcopal church in Palmyra, Wayne County, New York. It was designed in a Late Gothic Revival style by Emlyn T. Littel and was built in 1872. It is built of Medina sandstone with limestone trim. Its roof features polychrome slate shingles.

It was listed on the National Register of Historic Places in 1996. In 2009, it was included in the Palmyra Village Historic District.
