= Lauritz Smith =

Danish Mormon pioneer (1830–1924)

- Born: October 5, 1830; Hjørring, Denmark
- Died: June 16, 1924 (aged 93); Draper, Utah, U.S.
- Known for: Founder of Draper, Utah Territory
- Spouses: Maren Kirsten Mikelsen; Johanne Kirstine Jensen
- Parents: Nicolai Smidt Christensen; Karen Marie Christensdatter

Lauritz Nicholaisen Smith (or Smidt; October 5, 1830 – June 16, 1924) was an early Mormon leader and one of the founders of Draper, Utah, United States. Born in Denmark, he emigrated to Utah in 1854, where he worked as a blacksmith and plow-maker.

== Early life ==
Smith was born October 5, 1830, in Hjørring, Denmark, to Lutheran parents Nicolai Smidt Christensen and Karen Marie Christensdatter.

== Conversion, marriage, and emigration ==
A blacksmith by trade, Smith joined the LDS Church in August 1851. His future wife, Maren Kirsten Mikelsen, whom he did not know at the time, joined eight months later.

After joining the church, Smith labored with the missionaries in the Hjørring area, despite a ban on church services that were not Lutheran in nature. He eventually moved on to Schleswig, then in 1854 joined an emigrant party in Holstein-Glückstadt. The group crossed the sea to Hull, England, then traveled by rail to Liverpool to arrange trans-Atlantic passage.

The group sailed on January 3, 1854, from Liverpool, England, on the ship Jessie Munn, a Canadian-built square rig. Smith and Maren Kirsten Mikelsen, who had been baptized eight months after him, were married at sea. In addition, Smith was appointed to take care of the German church members on board. The ship arrived in New Orleans on March 22, after which the group proceeded on to the future Kansas City area by riverboat in order to outfit for the trek across the Great Plains to Utah Territory. The group suffered several cholera deaths on the Mississippi and Missouri rivers.

== Settling Utah ==
The Smiths arrived in Salt Lake City on October 15, 1854, and settled on 160 acres (0.6 km^{2}) on the eastern edge of South Willow Creek, near the south end of the valley. Smith had the reputation of being "the best plow-maker in the [Salt Lake] valley."

Smith began practicing plural marriage when he married Johanne Kirstine Jensen in 1867.

== Hideout for Porter Rockwell ==
After dining with the Smiths one day, Brigham Young complimented Maren on her cooking, then asked her to provide food for his bodyguard, Orrin Porter Rockwell, when he was in the area. She agreed to do so, and Rockwell subsequently used the Smiths' farm fields as a hideout when seeking protection from his enemies. "A child of Lauritz recounted the experience of taking a pot of stew to the pasture, leaving it, and then returning for the empty pot on a regular basis, not knowing why or who it was for."

== Death ==
Smith died at the age of 93 on June 16, 1924. His home on Pioneer Road in Draper is on the National Register of Historic Places.
