= Market Street Historic District (Palmyra, New York) =

Historic district in New York, United States

- U.S. National Register of Historic Places
- U.S. Historic district
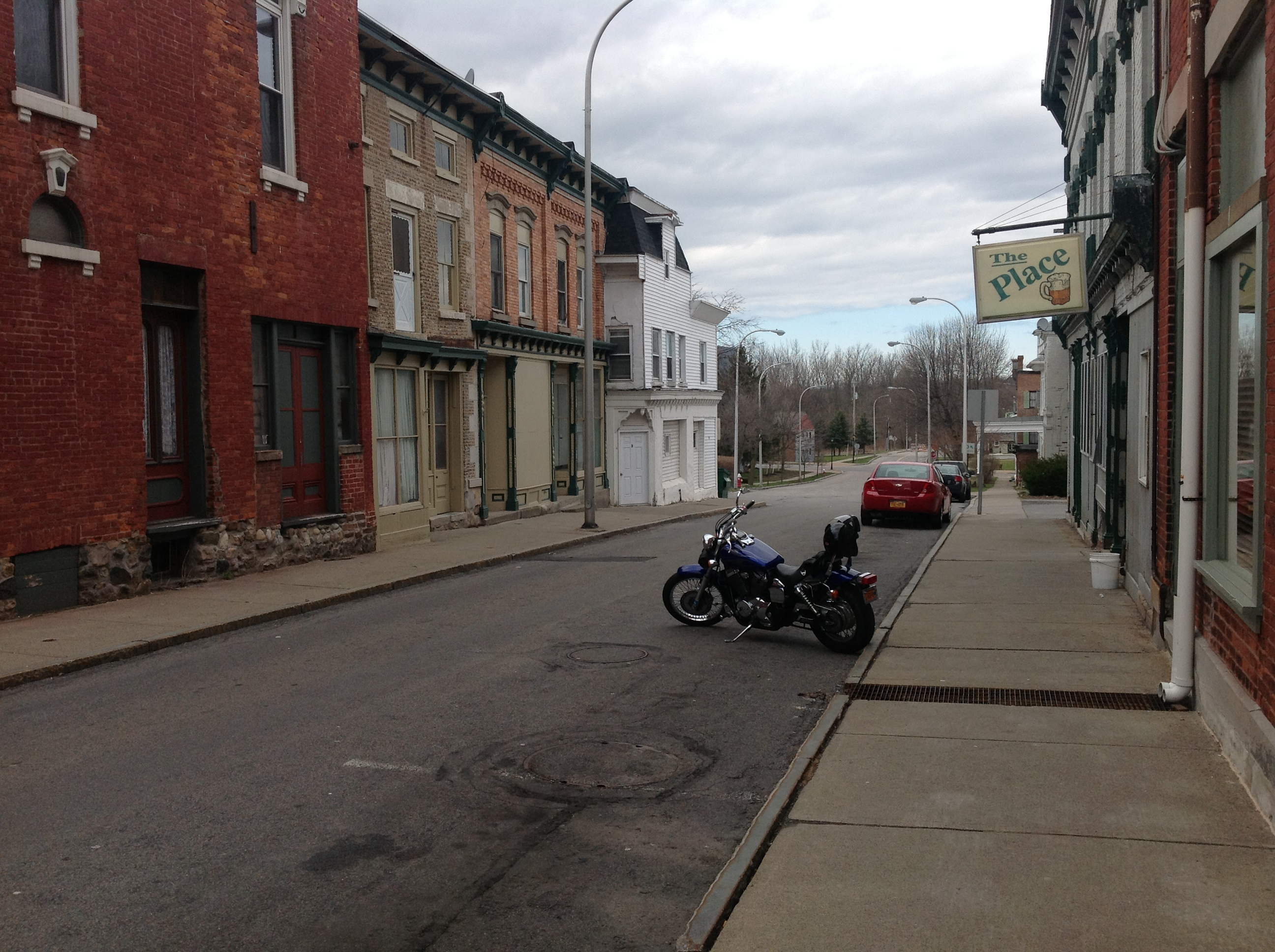
- Market Street Historic District, April 2013

- Location within New York Location within the United States
- Location: Both sides of Market St. between Canal and Main Sts., Palmyra, New York
- Coordinates: 43°3′52″N 77°13′47″W
- Area: 0 acres (0 ha)
- NRHP reference No.: 72000916
- Added to NRHP: December 08, 1972

Market Street Historic District is a national historic district located at Palmyra in Wayne County, New York. The district consists of a set of commercial and residential structures built between the 1830s and 1880s. Some of the commercial buildings have cast iron storefronts.

It was listed on the National Register of Historic Places in 1972. In 2009, it was included in the Palmyra Village Historic District.
