= Hot Springs Hotel and Brewery =

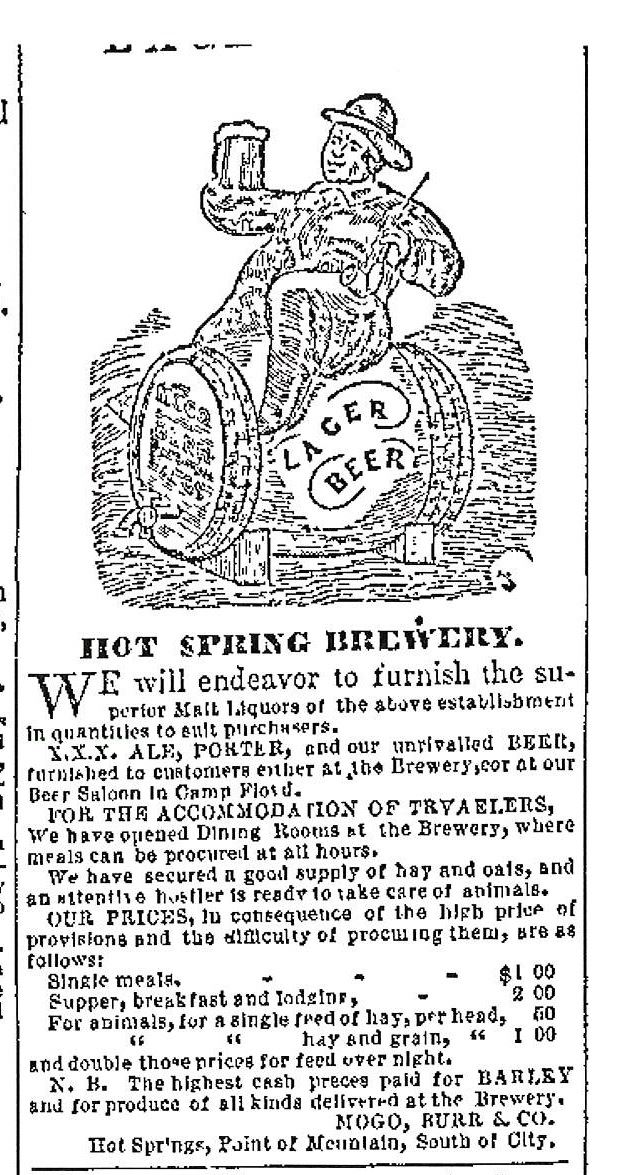
Newspaper advertisement for Hot Spring Brewery at Point of the Mountain, 1859

Hot Springs Hotel and Brewery was a Utah Pony Express station, inn and brewery founded in 1856 by Porter Rockwell at Point of the Mountain, modern-day Bluffdale, Utah.

Originally Porter purchased the property along with two partners but eventually after some conflict was able to buy out both his partners.

It was a contract Pony Express station, ten miles south of Trader's Rest station. Rockwell is known historically as the bodyguard of early Mormon leader and Utah settler Brigham Young. The brewery was Utah's first (Note: Listed as the state's first by Salt Lake Tribune and by Beehive Archive. Other sources list Utah's first commercial brewery as Henry Wagener's California Brewery, established in 1864.) and at its peak made 500 gallons of beer a day.

In October 1934, a memorial marker was placed in Bluffdale, incorporating stones from the inn's stable. It was moved at a later date to the present location (40.486°N 111.900°W) on Pony Express Road.
