= Yassine Cheuko =

French security professional and bodyguard of Lionel Messi

- Born: Paris, France
- Occupations: Security professional, bodyguard
- Years active: 2021–present
- Known for: Personal bodyguard of Lionel Messi

Yassine Sassi or Yassine Cheuko is a French-Tunisian security professional best known as the personal bodyguard of Argentinian footballer Lionel Messi. He first became Messi's bodyguard during the player's time at Paris Saint-Germain and followed him to Inter Miami CF in 2023. Cheuko accompanies Messi during matches and public events and has attracted media attention for his swift interventions. He has a background in martial arts and security.

== Early life and background ==
Yassine Cheuko grew up in a poor neighborhood in Paris, France to Tunisian parents. Little is publicly known about his early life, but he trained in martial arts from a young age. He later competed in mixed martial arts (MMA) matches in countries such as Thailand and Indonesia.

Though some outlets initially reported that he had served as a Navy SEAL and fought in Iraq and Afghanistan, these claims were debunked by investigations which found no record of U.S. military service.

In 2023, Cheuko co-founded a clothing brand called "Voclain" with business partner Besmir Dauti.

== Career ==
Cheuko began working in security in France and was part of the security detail for PSG, where he first began protecting Messi. When Messi signed with Inter Miami in July 2023, Cheuko relocated to the United States and continued working closely with him. Inter Miami officially employed him as part of a larger security team assigned to protect Messi and his family.

Cheuko remains active in martial arts and posts training videos online. In 2025, he publicly challenged YouTuber and boxer Logan Paul to a boxing match.

== Role with Lionel Messi ==
Cheuko's role involves accompanying Messi on and off the field. He stands close to the pitch during games and is responsible for responding to fan invasions or security threats. He has gained attention for physically removing pitch invaders who attempted to approach Messi, including a teenager during a 2023 match against Los Angeles FC.

In March 2025, Cheuko revealed that Inter Miami no longer allowed him to stand pitchside during games, though he remains part of Messi's protection team. He expressed frustration, noting that he had dealt with significantly more pitch invasions in the United States than in Europe.

Despite the restriction, Cheuko continues to escort Messi through stadiums, handle fan interactions, and assist the larger security staff.

== Public image ==
Cheuko has become a social media figure due to his constant presence near Messi. He is frequently praised for his quick reflexes and professionalism. Sports media have dubbed him "the Messi of bodyguards" in reference to his high-profile role and composure.

He has over one million followers on Instagram, where he posts updates about training and his life in Miami. Cheuko's popularity has also been boosted by viral clips, such as a 2025 charity match where he playfully tackled retired NBA player Steve Nash.
