= Palmyra Speedway =

Defunct auto racing venue in Palmyra, New York

- Location: Palmyra, New York
- Coordinates: 43.0604°N 77.1980°W
- Owner: Delbert Wilcox
- Opened: 1952
- Closed: 1955
- Surface: Dirt
- Length: .4 km (0.25 mi)
- Turns: 4

Palmyra Speedway was a 1/4-mile (0.40 km) dirt oval racing facility in the Finger Lakes Region of New York State.

== Overview ==
The designation "Palmyra Speedway" originated when auto racing was introduced to the Palmyra Fairgrounds horse track in the 1920s, and returned in 1948 when the Speed Corporation of America sanctioned stock car racing on the oval. The Interstate Auto Racing Club staged the final auto races held at the fairgrounds in 1950.

Race car builder Delbert Wilcox then teamed with landowner Walt Pulcini to create a quarter-mile track east of Palmyra village. The new facility was officially branded the "Palmyra Speedway," and opened on Memorial Day 1952 with sanctioning from the Bison Racing Club of Buffalo, New York. A weekly Sunday afternoon schedule of stock car racing began the next month, and Midget cars appeared on special events.

The venue closed at the end of the 1955 racing season, in part because spectators avoided paying admission by parking on neighboring roadways.
