= East Palmyra Presbyterian Church =

Historic church in New York, United States

- U.S. National Register of Historic Places
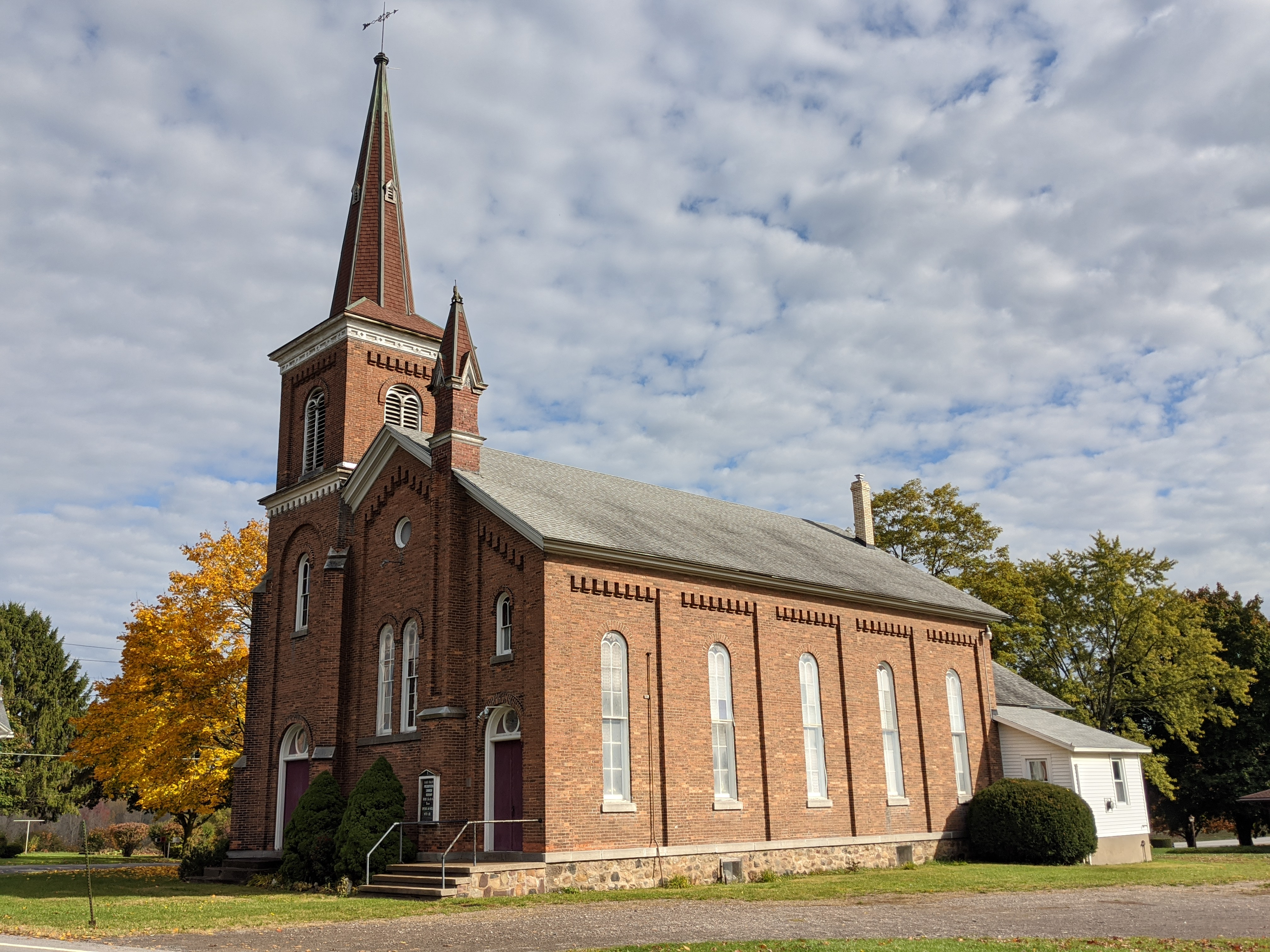

- Location within New York Location within the United States
- Location: 2102 Whitbeck Rd., East Palmyra, New York
- Coordinates: 43°5′2″N 77°8′52″W
- Area: less than one acre
- Built: 1868-1869
- Architect: Thomas, T.R.
- Architectural style: Romanesque
- NRHP reference No.: 02001651
- Added to NRHP: December 31, 2002

East Palmyra Presbyterian Church is a historic Presbyterian church located at East Palmyra in Wayne County, New York. It is a vernacular Romanesque style brick and stone church built in 1868–1869. The front facade features a square tower composed of stone capped brick buttresses, a belfry articulated by brick pilasters and corbelled brick trim, and a tall, octagonal spire.

It was listed on the National Register of Historic Places in 2002.
