= Palmyra (village), New York =

Palmyra, New York
- Village
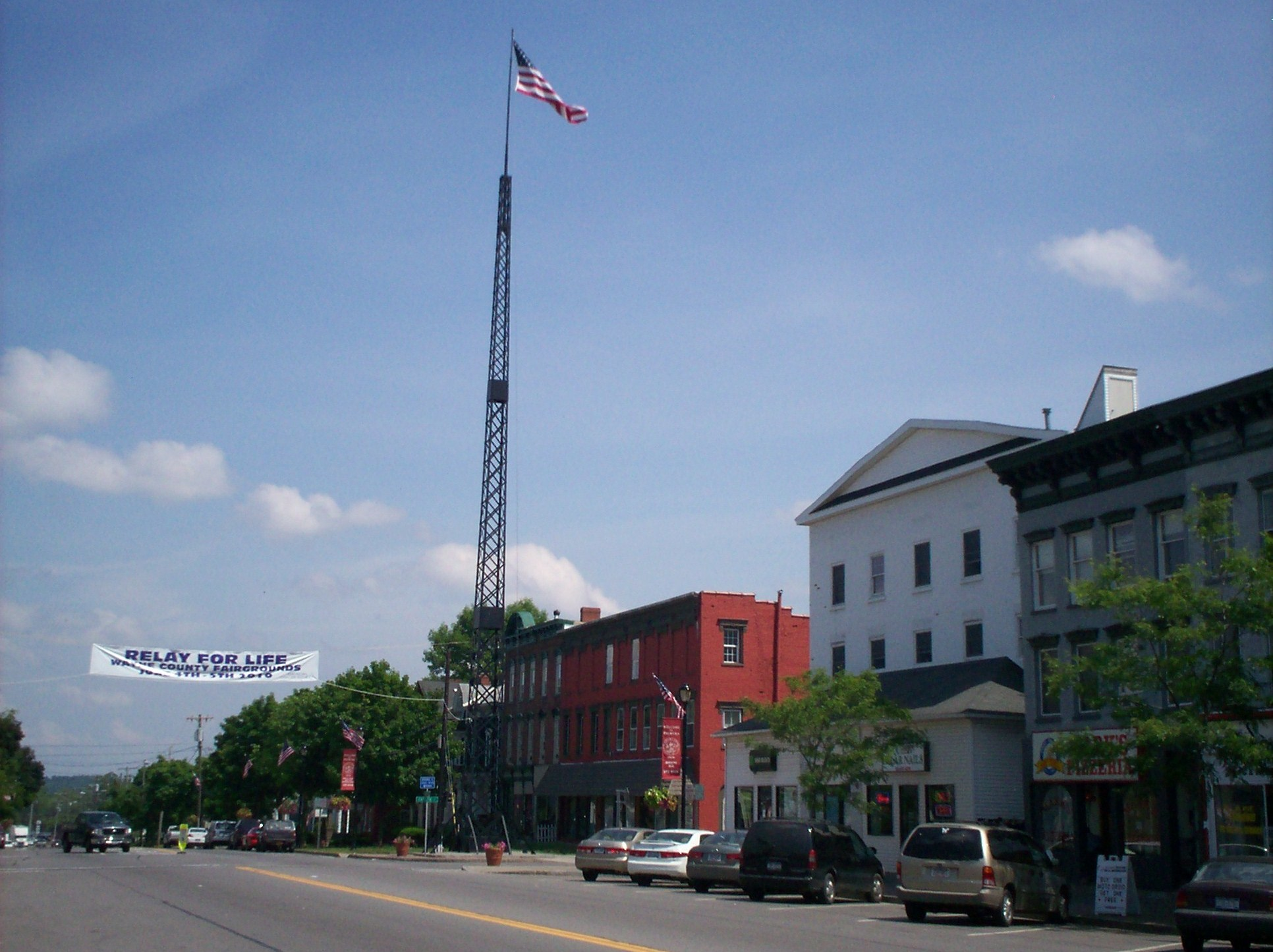
- Downtown Palmyra in 2010

- Location in Wayne County and the state of New York.

- Location within the state of New York
- Coordinates: 43°03′51″N 77°14′01″W
- Country: United States
- State: New York
- County: Wayne
- Town: Palmyra
- Settled: 1790
- Incorporated: March 29, 1827
- Named for: Palmyra in the Levant

Government
  - Type: Board of Trustees
  - Mayor: Rick Perry
  - Clerk: Rebecca Wetherby
  - Court: Justice Terry Rodman; Justice Sherman Yates

Area
  - Total: 1.35 sq mi (3.49 km^{2})
  - Land: 1.35 sq mi (3.49 km^{2})
  - Water: 0 sq mi (0.00 km^{2})
- Elevation: 486 ft (148 m)

Population (2020)
  - Total: 3,305
  - Density: 2,453.8/sq mi (947.42/km^{2})
- Time zone: UTC-5 (EST)
  - Summer (DST): UTC-4 (EDT)
- ZIP Code(s): 14522
- Area codes: 315 and 680
- FIPS code: 36-56187
- GNIS feature ID: 0970448
- Website: https://www.palmyravillageny.gov/

Palmyra (/ˌpælˈmaɪrə/) is a village in Wayne County, New York, United States. The population was 3,536 at the 2010 census. The village, along with the town, is named after Palmyra in present-day Syria.

The village is in the Town of Palmyra. The village is east of Rochester.

== History ==
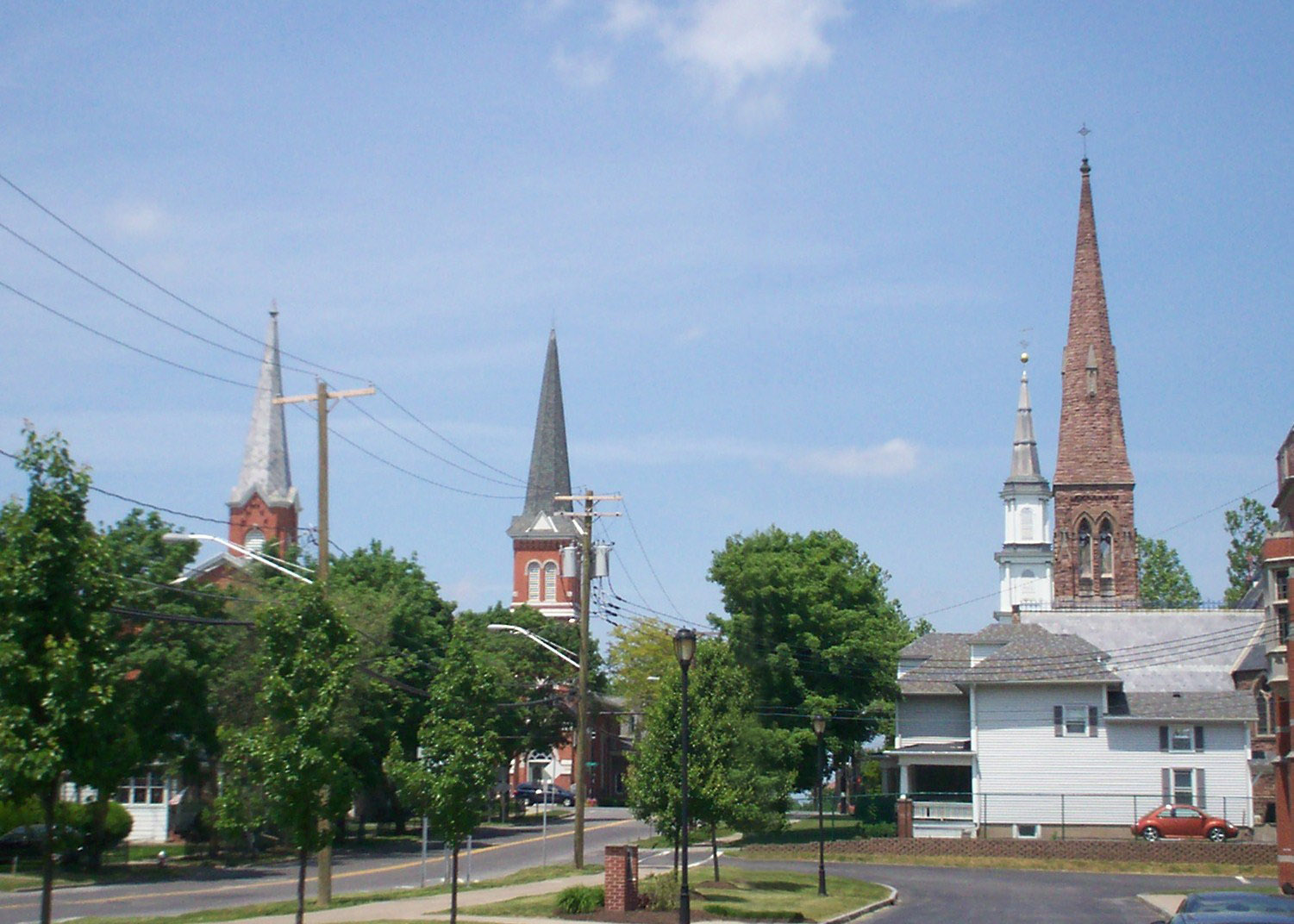
Four churches at Palmyra's main intersection

The village was originally called "Swift's Landing" after founder John Swift in 1790, and was incorporated as Palmyra in 1827. By 1900, the village had become a railroad and industrial center. Palmyra was a large part of the underground railroad during times of slavery; it is reported to have helped over 2,000 fugitive slaves escape into Canada.

Palmyra claims to be the only city or village in the U.S. to have four churches at a four corner intersection facing each other. It is one of ten places in the world that has four churches on the four corners of two intersecting highways. The "four corners" churches are at the intersection of New York State Route 21 and New York State Route 31.

The Palmyra Village Historic District was listed on the National Register of Historic Places in 2009. It includes the previously listed Market Street Historic District, East Main Street Commercial Historic District, and Zion Episcopal Church.

Palmyra is part of the Erie Canalway National Heritage Corridor. Erie Canal Lock 29 is behind Palmyra-Macedon Aqueduct Park, just off N.Y. Route 31. It was built around 1914, and has a lift of 16 feet (4.88 m) to the west. Nearby are the remains of the Palmyra Aqueduct (built 1857), also known as Mud Creek Aqueduct. Before the Erie Canal was re-routed, it crossed the top of aqueduct over Ganargua Creek. The former Erie Canal Change Bridge #35 (also called Aldrich Bridge), is at Palmyra-Macedon Aqueduct Park. A change bridge allowed towpaths to switch from one side of the canal to the other. It was first constructed in 1858. The bridge was sold to a local farm in 1915, but later salvaged after flooding in 1996 and reconstructed eight years later at the park.

=== Place in early Latter-Day Saint History ===
In 1830 the village was the site of the first publication of the Book of Mormon at the printing press of local publisher E. B. Grandin. Many other events in the early history of the Latter Day Saint movement took place in the village and town. The Book of Mormon Historic Publication Site has been maintained by the Church of Jesus Christ of Latter-day Saints since 1978 as a tourist destination and was restored and rededicated in 1998.

=== 2013 Downtown fire ===
On May 3, 2013, a fire started by alleged arson destroyed three historic Main Street buildings dating to the village's Erie Canal era, and water from the firefighting response damaged a fourth. The buildings were condemned on May 7 and were demolished that summer. The buildings had survived proposed demolition during the urban renewal era of the 1960s.

== Geography ==
According to the United States Census Bureau, the village has an area of 1.3 square miles (3.4 km^{2}), all land.

It is at 43.063°N 77.233°W. It is part of metropolitan Rochester, New York.

Palmyra village is at the junction of New York State Route 31 and New York State Route 21, which are partly conjoined in the village. Palmyra is along the Erie Canal and is south of Lake Ontario.

== Demographics ==
Historical population
Census	Pop.	Note	%±
1870	2,152		—
1880	2,308		7.2%
1890	2,131		−7.7%
1900	1,937		−9.1%
1910	2,268		17.1%
1920	2,480		9.3%
1930	2,592		4.5%
1940	2,709		4.5%
1950	3,034		12.0%
1960	3,476		14.6%
1970	3,776		8.6%
1980	3,729		−1.2%
1990	3,566		−4.4%
2000	3,490		−2.1%
2010	3,536		1.3%
2020	3,305		−6.5%
U.S. Decennial Census

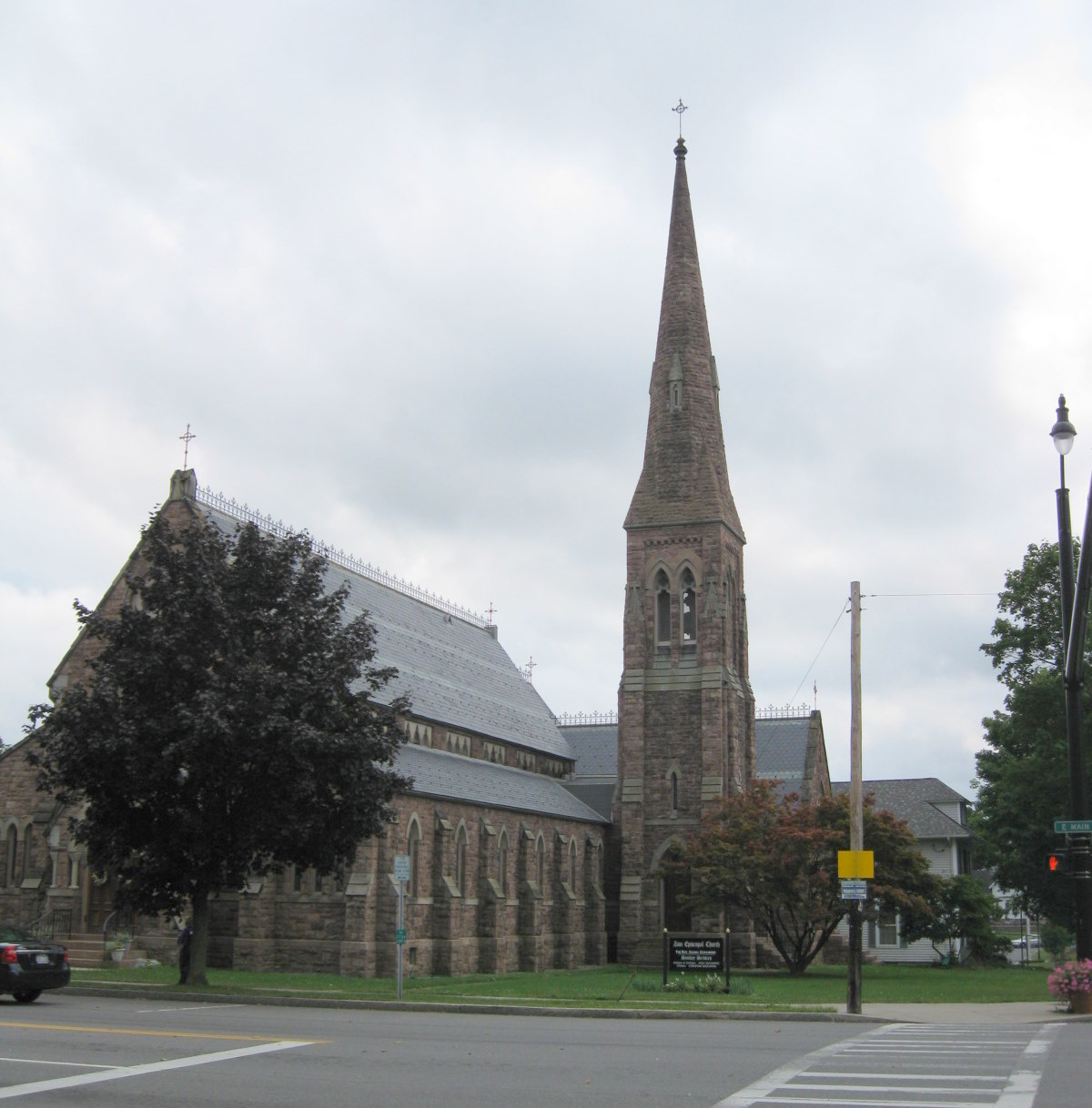
The Zion Episcopal Church in downtown Palmyra

As of the census of 2010, there were 3,536 people, 1,508 households, and 882 families residing in the village. The population density was 2,720.0 inhabitants per square mile (1,050.2/km^{2}). The racial makeup of the village was 96.6% White, 0.9% Black or African American, 0.4% Native American, 0.4% Asian, 0.1% Pacific Islander, 0.2% from other races, and 1.2% from two or more races. Hispanic or Latino of any race were 1.1% of the population.

There were 1,508 households, out of which 27.9% had children under the age of 18 living with them, 40.7% were married couples living together, 12.2% had a female householder with no husband present, and 41.5% were non-families. 33.4% of all households were made up of individuals, and 12.2% had someone living alone who was 65 years of age or older. The average household size was 2.32 and the average family size was 2.99.

In the village, the population was spread out, with 26.7% under the age of 20, 5.7% from 20 to 24, 25.4% from 25 to 44, 29.1% from 45 to 64, and 13.1% who were 65 years of age or older. The median age was 39.4 years. For every 100 females, there were 95.9 males. For every 100 females age 18 and over, there were 91.9 males.

The median income for a household in the village was $39,493, and the median income for a family was $53,221. Males had a median income of $41,322 versus $38,966 for females. The per capita income for the village was $22,004. About 20.4% of families and 21.1% of the population were below the poverty line, including 34.3% of those under age 18 and 15.5% of those age 65 or over.

=== Housing ===
There were 1,637 housing units at an average density of 1,259.2 per square mile (486.2/km^{2}); 7.9% of housing units were vacant.

There were 1,508 occupied housing units in the village, of which 789 were owner-occupied units (52.3%), while 719 were renter-occupied (47.7%). The homeowner vacancy rate was 1.2% of total units. The rental unit vacancy rate was 10.0%.

== Notable person ==
- E. B. Grandin, publisher of the first edition of the Book of Mormon

== See also ==
- List of villages in New York
- Palmyra Speedway
- Wayne County Fairgrounds
