= East Main Street Commercial Historic District (Palmyra, New York) =

Historic district in New York, United States

- U.S. National Register of Historic Places
- U.S. Historic district
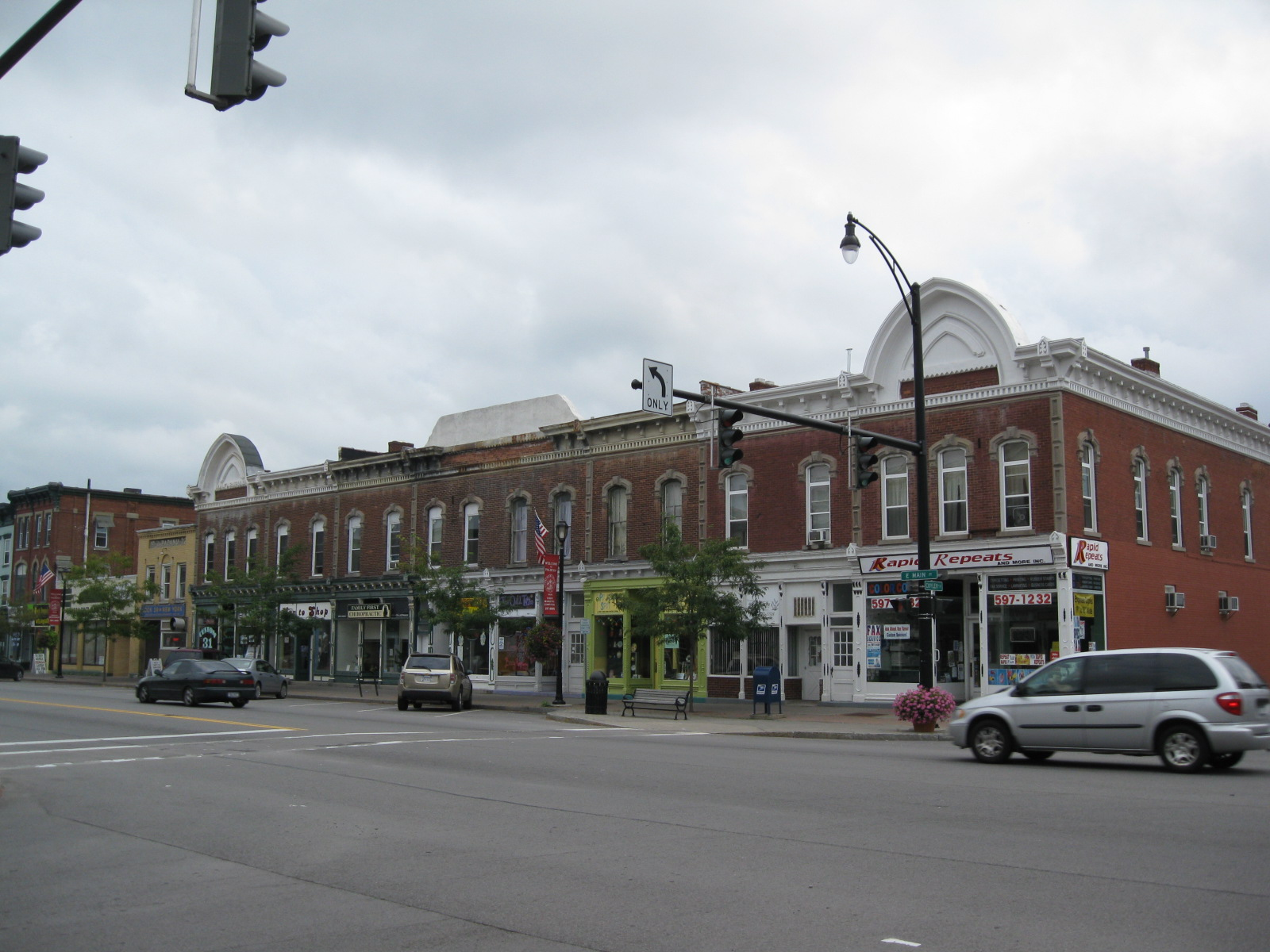
- East Main Street Commercial Historic District, August 2009

- Location within New York Location within the United States
- Interactive map of East Main Street Commercial Historic District
- Location: Between Clinton and William-Cuyler Sts., Palmyra, New York
- Coordinates: 43°3′49″N 77°13′49″W
- Area: 6 acres (2.4 ha)
- NRHP reference No.: 74001318
- Added to NRHP: November 21, 1974

East Main Street Commercial Historic District is a national historic district located at Palmyra in Wayne County, New York, USA. The district encompasses Palmyra's downtown business area and contains two blocks of solid, brick 19th century commercial architecture. These almost unbroken commercial facades are two and three stories high with a variety of cornice detail and first floor treatment. Included are a number of cast iron storefronts.

It was listed on the National Register of Historic Places in 1974. In 2009, it was included in the Palmyra Village Historic District.
