= Palmyra Village Historic District =

Historic district in New York, United States

- U.S. National Register of Historic Places
- U.S. Historic district
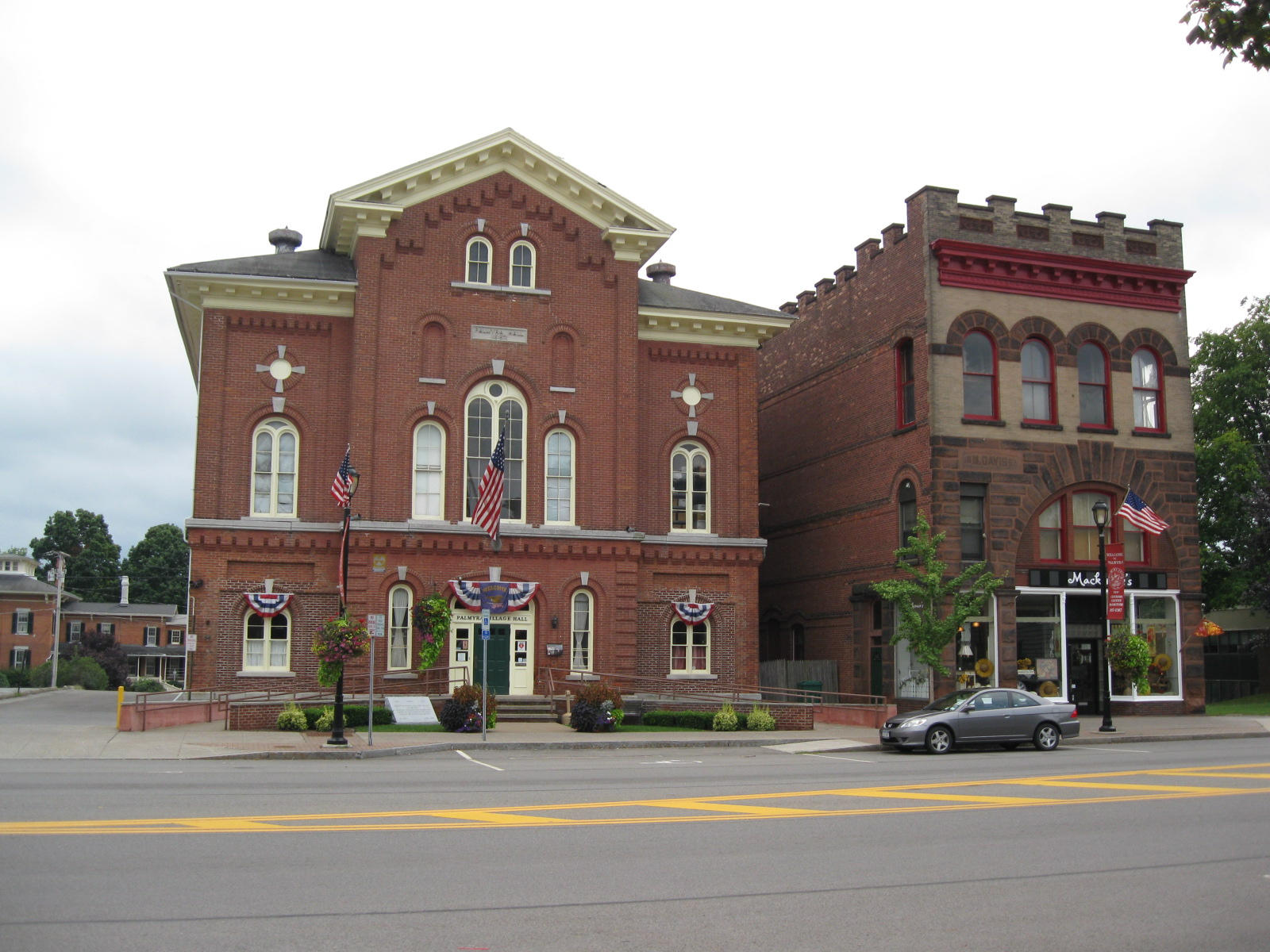
- Palmyra Village Hall, August 2009

- Location within New York Location within the United States
- Location: Portions of Canandaigue, Church, Cuyler, E. and W. Jackson, Market, E. and W. Main Sts., Palmyra, New York
- Coordinates: 43°3′50.23″N 77°13′59.93″W
- Area: 82 acres (33 ha)
- Built: 1792
- Architectural style: Federal, Greek Revival, Late Victorian
- NRHP reference No.: 09000836
- Added to NRHP: October 16, 2009

Palmyra Village Historic District is a national historic district at Palmyra in Wayne County, New York.

The district includes 207 contributing buildings, 2 contributing sites, 7 contributing structures, and 1 contributing object. It encompasses Palmyra's commercial, civic, religious, and residential core. Most of the buildings were built between about 1830 and 1890, and is representative of a quintessential canal town in New York State. It includes the previously listed Market Street Historic District, East Main Street Commercial Historic District, and Zion Episcopal Church. New areas in the district are the Palmyra Village Civic Center Area, Four Churches Area, Swift Cemetery Area, Residential West Main Street, Palmyra Elementary School Area, Residential Cuyler Street and East and West Jackson Street, The Fairgrounds, and Residential East Main Street.

Notable buildings include the Village Hall (1866-1868), Griffith Block (c. 1893), First National Bank (1925), bandstand on the village green (c. 1906), First Methodist Church (1866-1867), Western Presbyterian Church (c. 1832), First Baptist Church (1871), St. Anne's Roman Catholic Church (1859-1870s), Alexander McKachnie House (c. 1830), Garlock Office Building, Sherburne Ford building (c. 1910), Palmyra Elementary School (1924), the Carlton Rogers House (1850s), and the Floral Hall (1856).

It was listed on the National Register of Historic Places in 2009.

== 2013 Downtown Fire ==
On May 3, 2013, a fire started by alleged arson destroyed three historic Main Street buildings dating to the village's Erie Canal era, and water from the firefighting response damaged a fourth. The buildings were condemned on May 7 and are scheduled to be demolished by June 30. The buildings survived proposed demolition during the urban renewal era of the 1960s, and may be replaced by a new structure to be raised by one of the destroyed building's owners.
