= Bodyguard =

Security person or persons assigned to protect an individual

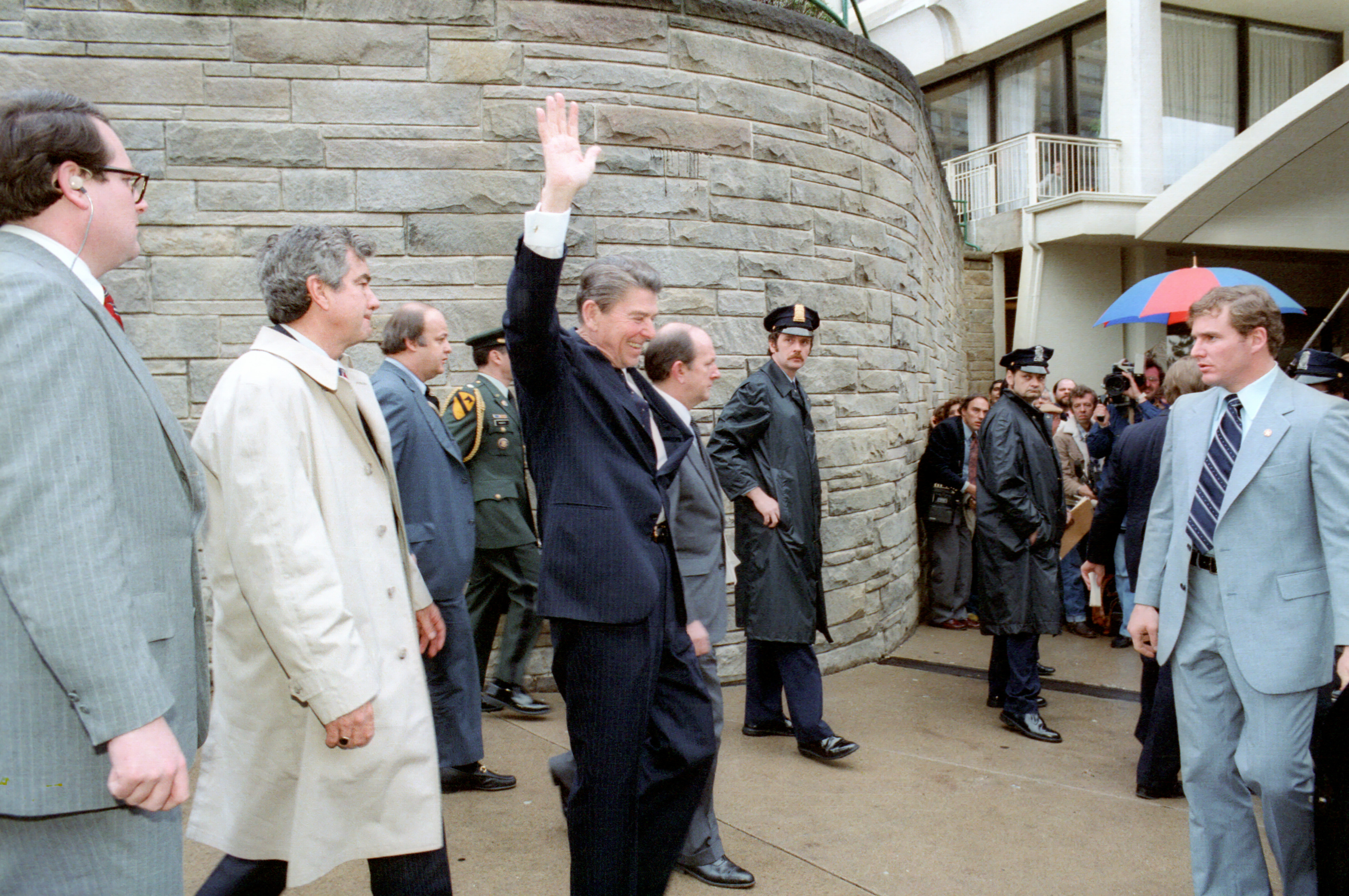
- Bodyguards with President Ronald Reagan moments before he was shot and almost killed in late March 1981

Occupation
- Names: Close protection officer, executive protection agent, personal protection specialist
- Occupation type: Government employment or private employment
- Activity sectors: Law enforcement, government, military, security

Description
- Related jobs: Security guard, law enforcement officer, anti-terrorism specialist, intelligence officer

A bodyguard (or close protection officer/operative) is a type of security guard, government law enforcement officer, or servicemember who protects an important person or group of people, such as high-ranking public officials, wealthy businesspeople, and celebrities, from harm. The personnel team that protects a VIP is often referred to as the VIP's security detail.

Most important public figures, such as heads of state, heads of government, and governors are protected by a team of bodyguards from a government agency, security forces, or police forces. Less-important public figures, or those with lower risk profiles, may be accompanied by a single bodyguard who doubles as a driver. Bodyguards have existed since ancient civilizations, with notable examples including the Roman Praetorian Guard, Persian Immortals, and the Janissaries of the Ottoman Empire. These roles have evolved into modern executive protection professionals, equipped with advanced technologies and training.

== Roles ==
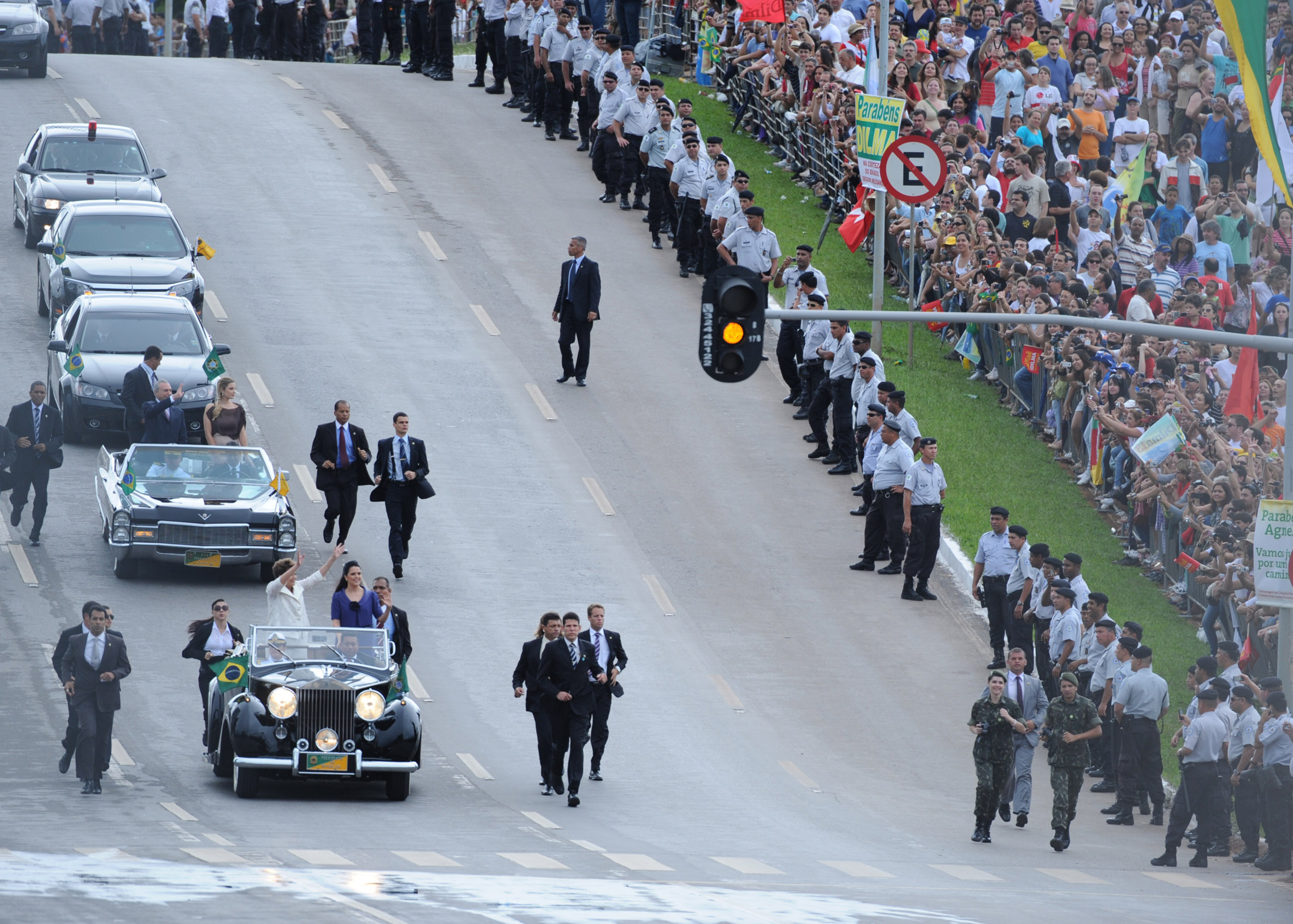
A team of bodyguards protecting Brazilian President Dilma Rousseff during her inaugural ceremony.

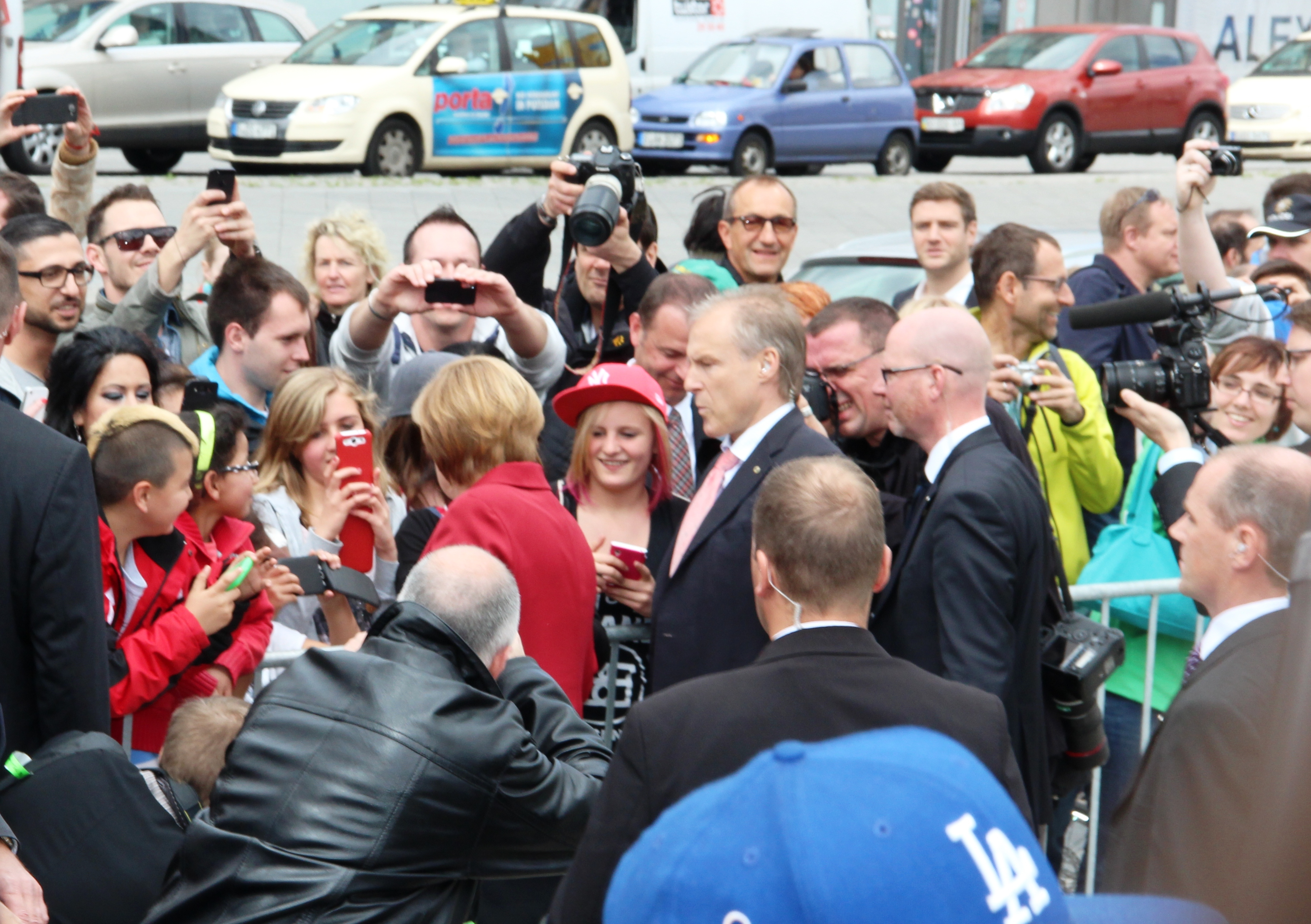
Angela Merkel, the Chancellor of Germany, with her bodyguards.

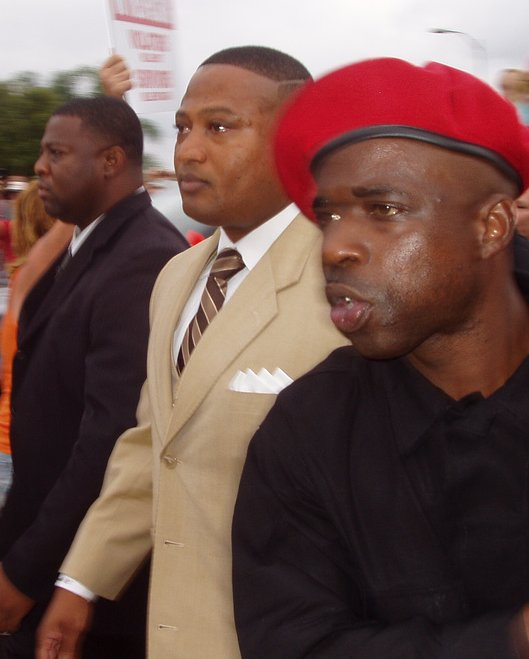
Quanell X (center), the leader of the New Black Panther Party, with his bodyguards.

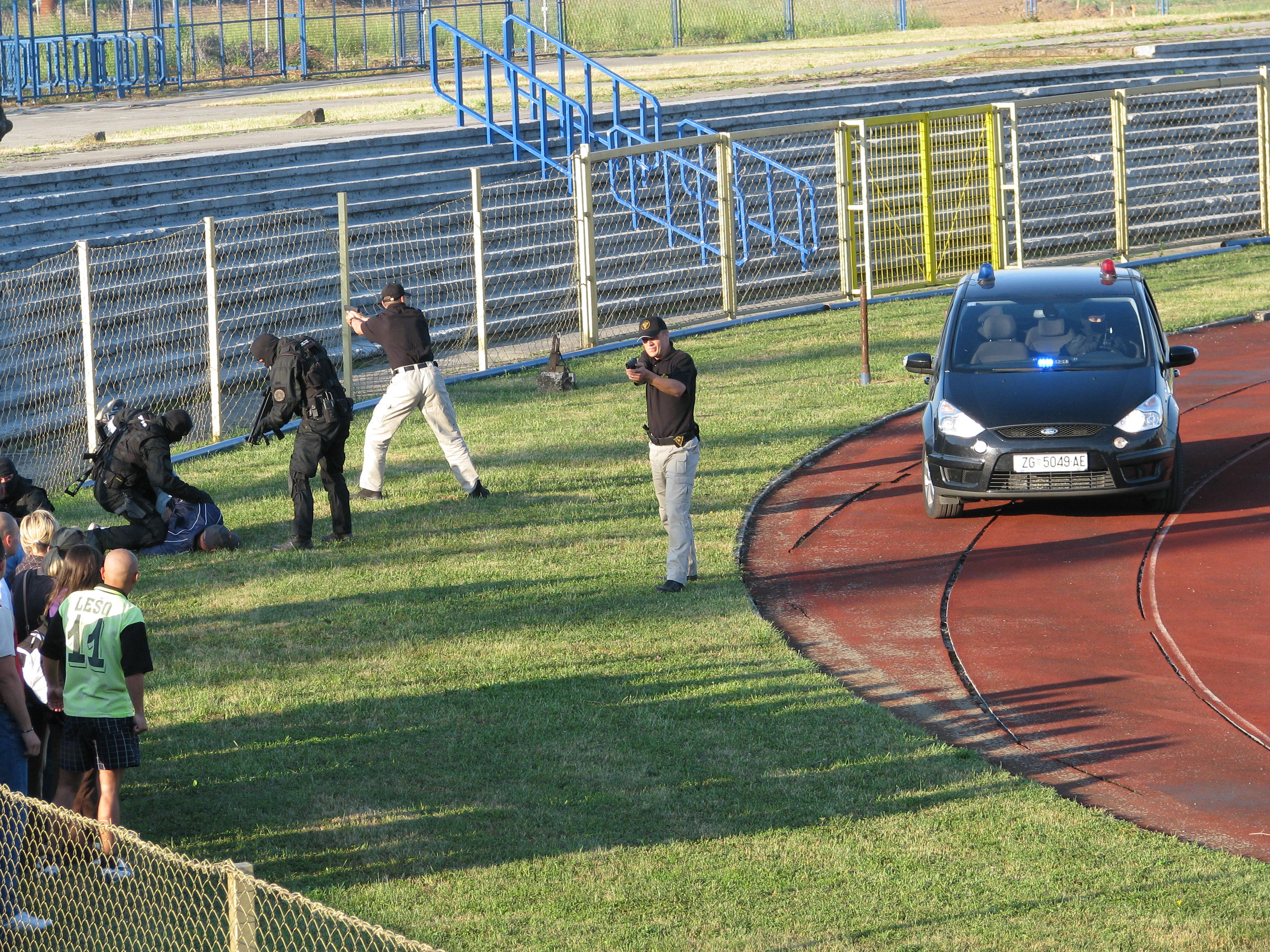
A Croatian close protection unit trains using sub-machine guns and pistols during a demonstration exercise.

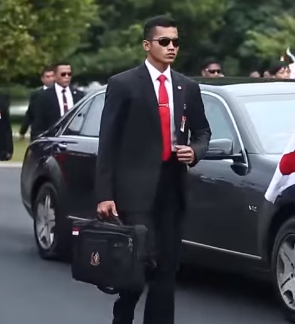
A Paspampres agent a.k.a. President Bodyguards in Indonesia

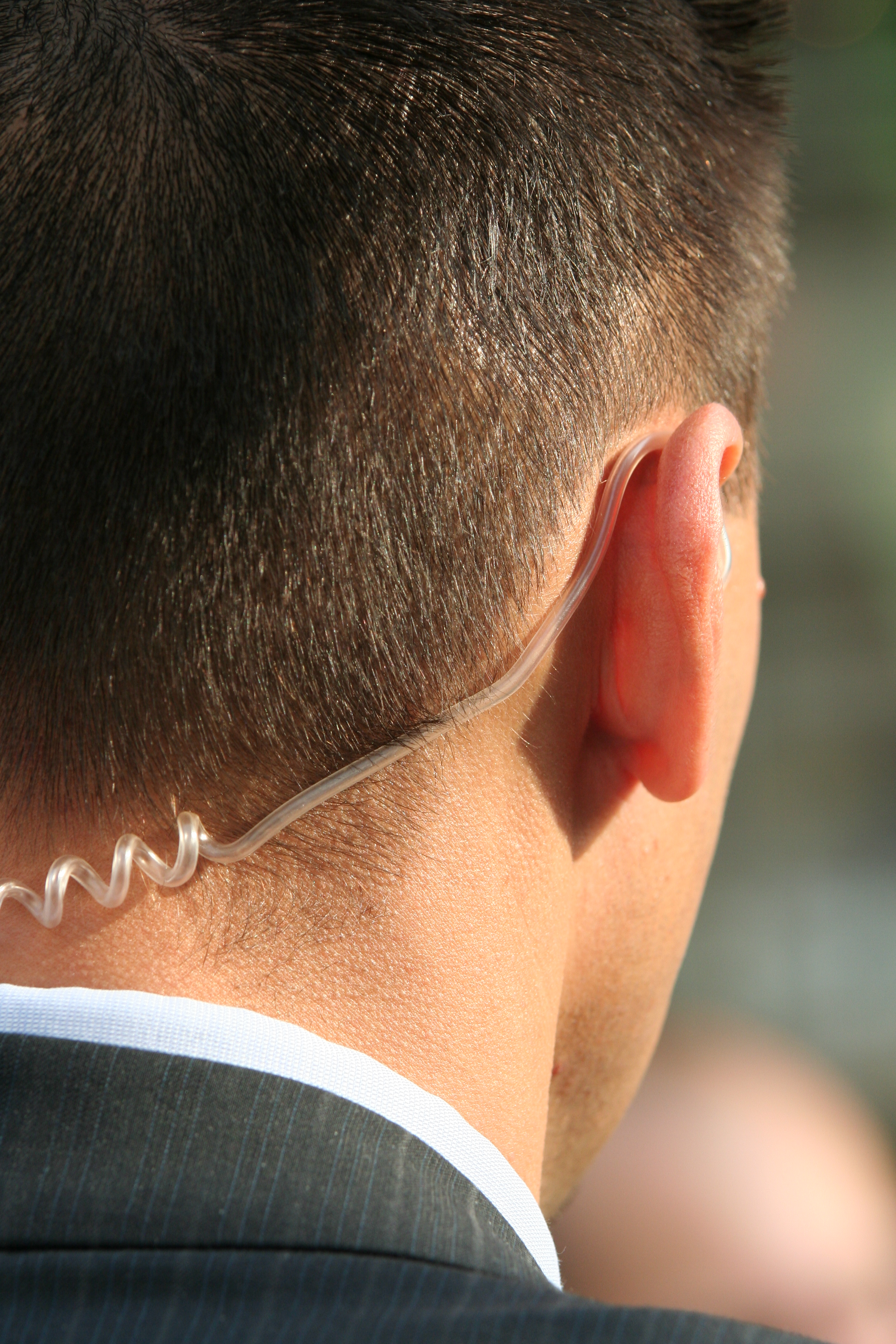
A bodyguard wearing an earpiece for two-way radio, so he can receive instructions.

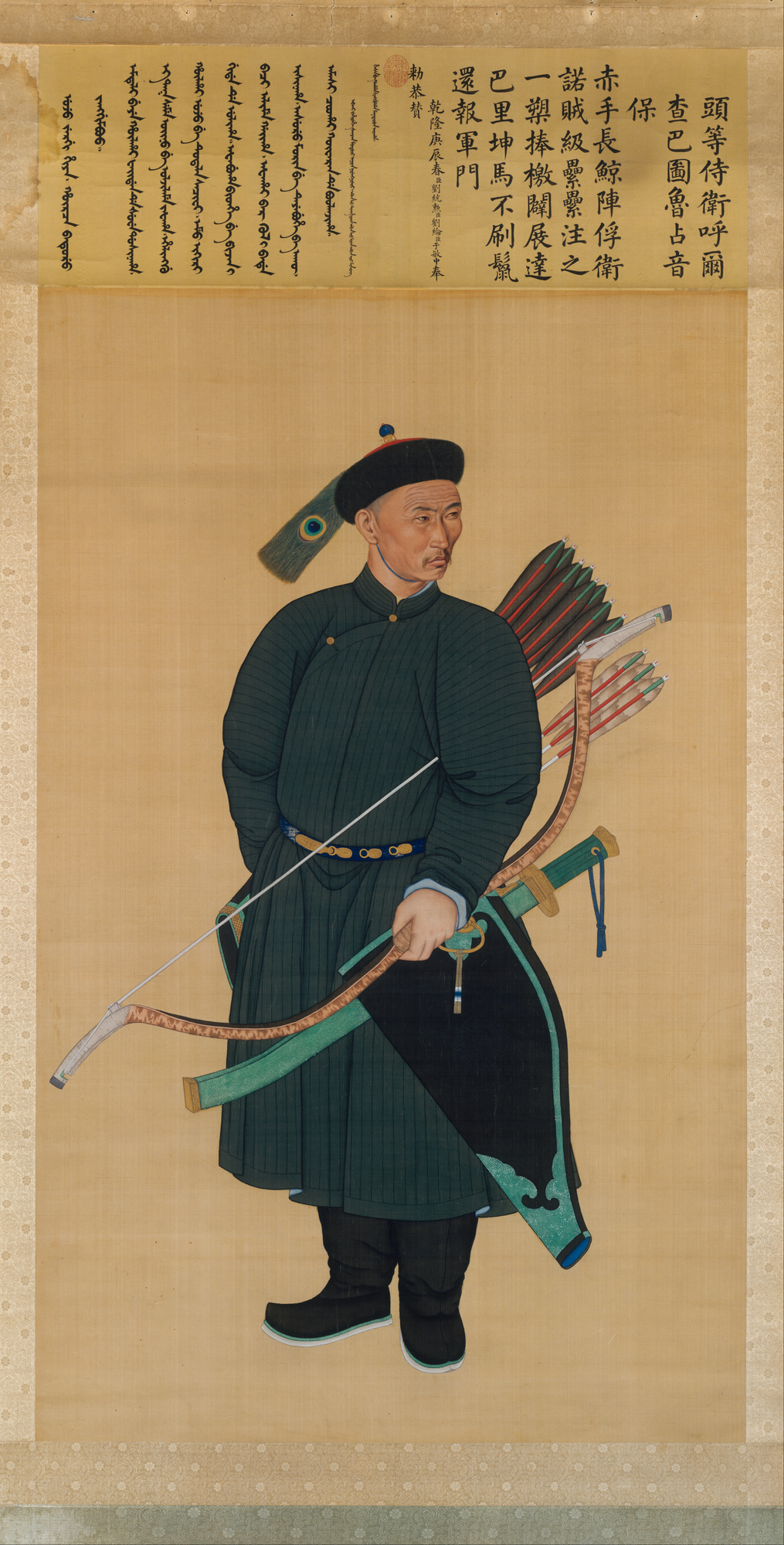
18th century Manchu Imperial Guard of the Qianlong Emperor.

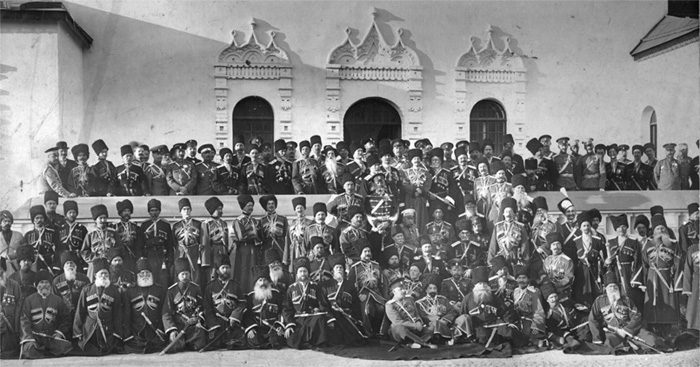
The Cossacks Imperator Bodyguard unit from the early 1900s.

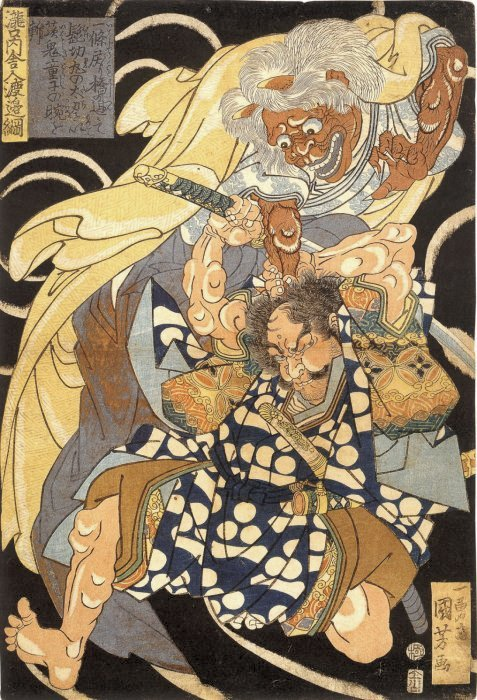
Illustration of Japanese Imperial bodyguard Watanabe no Tsuna fighting a demon.

The work of a bodyguard consists mainly of planning routes, pre-searching rooms and buildings where the client will be visiting, researching the backgrounds of people that will have contact with the client, searching vehicles, and escorting the client on their day-to-day activities. In the event of an emergency, a bodyguard's priority will always be to evacuate their client, rather than engage with threats.

== See also ==
- List of bodyguards
- List of protective service agencies
- Private investigator
- Private military company
- Secret service
- Security detail
- Security police—persons who guard government property.
- Royal guards
- Republican guard
- Witness protection
- Counterterrorism
- Tactics and skills
  - Counter-sniper tactics
  - Close-quarters combat
  - Threat assessment
  - Unarmed combat
- Security company
- Regulation of private security guards
  - fr:Conseil national des activités privées de sécurité (French regulator)
  - Security Industry Authority (UK regulator)
- Particular units or kinds
  - Housecarls (medieval Scandinavia and Anglo-Saxon England)
  - Antrustion, the bodyguards of the Merovingian kings
  - Praetorian Guard, the bodyguards of the Roman Emperors
  - Rynda, ceremonial bodyguard of early Russian tsars
  - Somatophylakes, the Macedonian bodyguard of Alexander the Great
  - Spatharios, the bodyguard of Byzantine emperors
  - Yojimbo, the Japanese word for bodyguard
  - Pontifical Swiss Guard
  - United Kingdom
    - Royalty and Diplomatic Protection Department of the Metropolitan Police
    - Sovereign's Bodyguard
  - United States
    - Bureau of Diplomatic Security of the United States Department of State
    - Secret Service
  - India
    - National Security Guards (NSG) of the Ministry of Home Affairs (India), responsible for protecting the Prime Minister
    - Special Protection Group (SPG), a specialized unit created after the Indira Gandhi assassination in 1984
    - President's Bodyguards, a mechanized regiment of the Indian Army that is the ceremonial bodyguard of the President of India
