= Palmyra, New York =

- Town
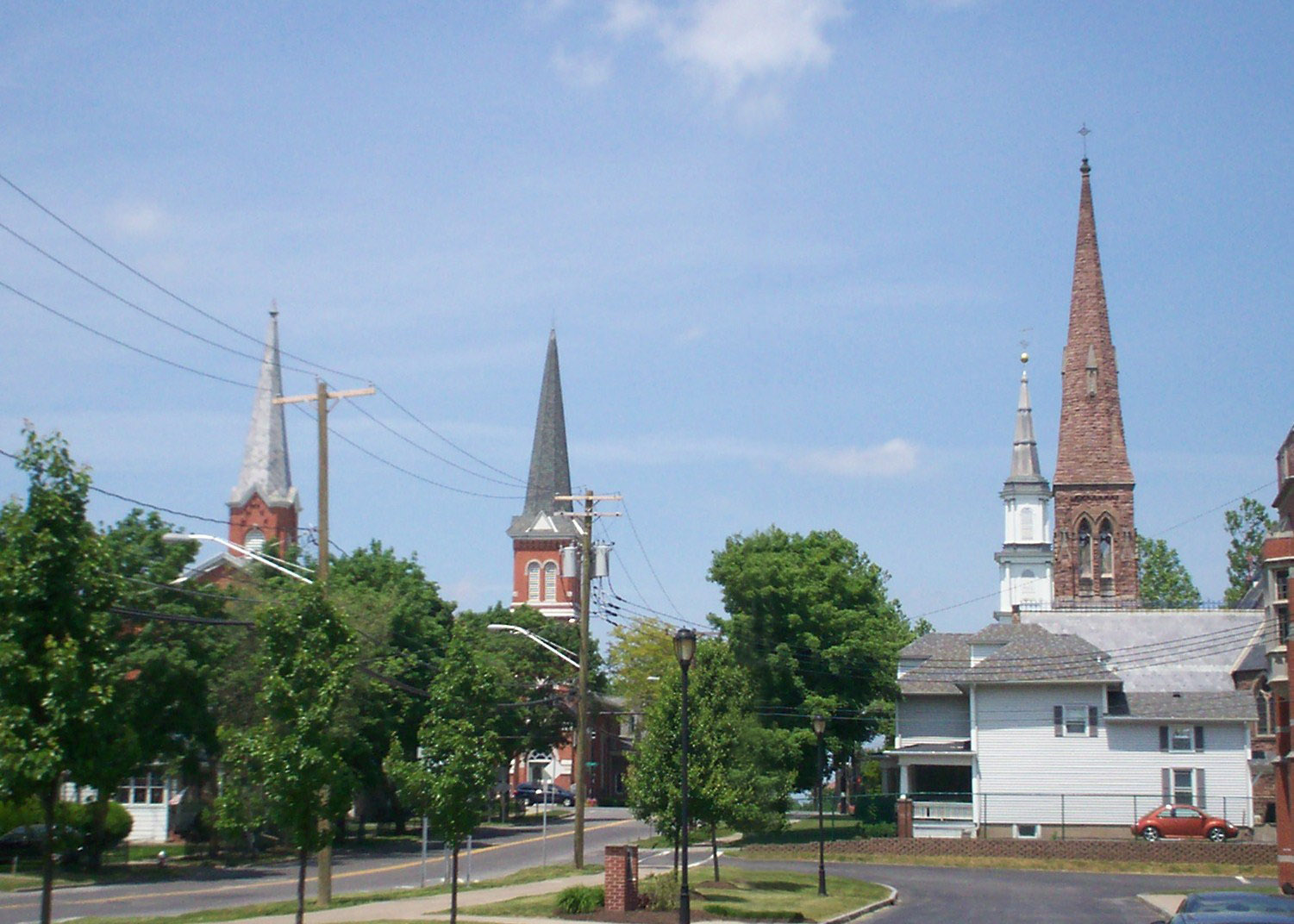
- The East Main Street Commercial Historic District

- Location in Wayne County and the state of New York.

- Location within the state of New York
- Coordinates: 43°03′50″N 77°14′00″W
- Country: United States
- State: New York
- County: Wayne
- Settled: 1789
- Established: January 16, 1789

Government
  - Type: Town Board
  - Supervisor: Kenneth F. Miller
  - Clerk: Irene E. Unterborn
  - Court: Justice Sherman Yates; Justice Terry Rodman

Area
  - Total: 33.67 sq mi (87.20 km^{2})
  - Land: 33.44 sq mi (86.60 km^{2})
  - Water: 0.24 sq mi (0.61 km^{2})
- Elevation: 486 ft (148 m)

Population (2016)
  - Total: 7,975
  - Estimate (2016): 7,638
  - Density: 228/sq mi (88.2/km^{2})
- Time zone: UTC-5 (Eastern (EST))
  - Summer (DST): UTC-4 (EDT)
- ZIP code: 14522
- Area codes: 315 and 680
- FIPS code: 36-56231
- Website: https://www.palmyrany.gov/

Palmyra (/ˌpælˈmaɪrə/) is a town in southwestern Wayne County, New York, United States. The population was 7,975 at the 2010 census. The town is named after the ancient city Palmyra in Syria.

The town contains a village also named Palmyra. The town is about 20 miles (32 km) southeast of Rochester, New York.

== History ==
The prehistoric Adena culture left mounds in the area.

Palmyra was part of the Phelps and Gorham Purchase.

The Town of Palmyra, originally called "Swift's Landing" after its founder John Swift and "District of Tolland," was created in 1789. The sole local encounter between natives and white settlers that resulted in deaths occurred that same year. The present name was adopted in 1796, reportedly to impress a new school teacher. There were almost one thousand people in the town in 1800.

The Erie Canal was completed up to Palmyra in 1822, although the canal was not completed to its western terminus until 1825. Palmyra is part of the Erie Canalway National Heritage Corridor.

In 1823, the Town of Macedon was formed from part of Palmyra's territory as part of the creation of Wayne County from Ontario County.

=== Birth of Latter Day Saint movement ===
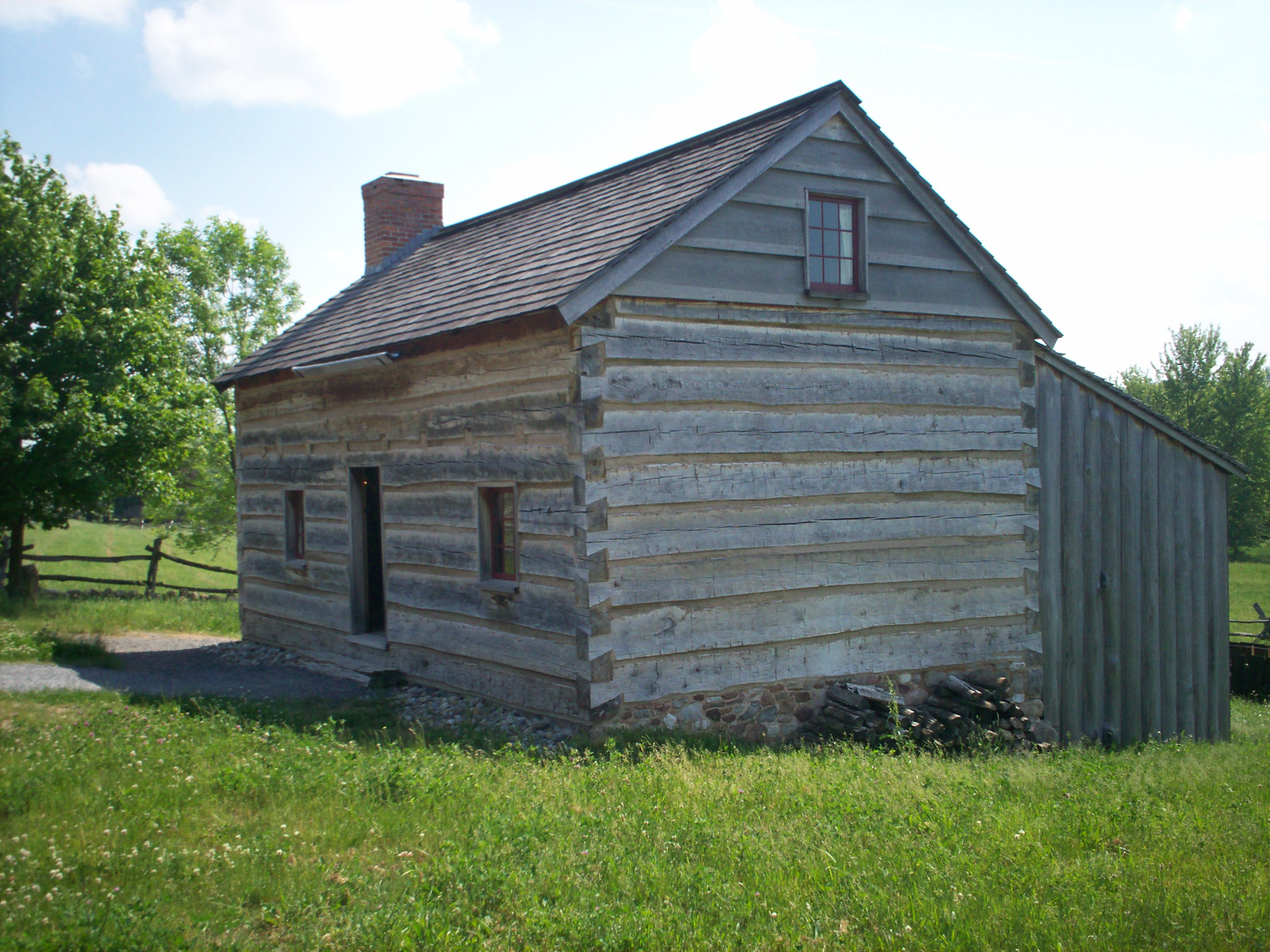
Smith log cabin

Palmyra is the birthplace of the Latter Day Saint movement. Founder Joseph Smith, whose family lived on a farm that straddled the line between Palmyra and Manchester, said he had been visited by God and Jesus Christ in 1820, an event known as the First Vision. In 1830 the Book of Mormon was first published in the village of Palmyra by E.B. Grandin, in the present Book of Mormon Historic Publication Site. Beginning in the early 20th century, the Church of Jesus Christ of Latter-day Saints began buying and restoring many of the properties in the area associated with early church history. In 1997 the Smiths' log cabin was rebuilt on its original site and in 2000 the church built the Palmyra New York Temple on a portion of the former Smith farm.

== Geography ==
According to the United States Census Bureau, the town has a total area of 33.7 square miles (87.3 km^{2}), of which 33.5 square miles (86.7 km^{2}) is land and 0.2 square mile (0.5 km^{2}) (0.62%) is water.

The Erie Canal passes across the county, through the Village of Palmyra. The multi-use, recreational Erie Canal Heritage Trail continues along the towpath of the Erie Canal as well.

The south town line is the border of Ontario County.

New York State Route 21 (north-south) intersects New York State Route 31 (east-west) in Palmyra village.

== Education ==
The Palmyra-Macedon High School, Palmyra-Macedon Middle School and Palmyra-Macedon Primary School, which serves pre-K as well, are all located within Palmyra and part of the Palmyra-Macedon Central School District.

The Palmyra Community Library is a Board of Regents chartered library that serves the public with a collection of books, magazines, videos, audiobooks, video games, and local references that may be borrowed or viewed. The library also hosts a variety of community events year round. Free wireless internet and computer access are available on site.

In 2011, the library moved to its current location in the renovated Garlock Packing Company Building. The move was prompted by a need to expand on site resources, increase seating, and add community gathering spaces. The building the Library vacated is now used as district offices for the Palmyra-Macedon Central School District.

== Demographics ==
Historical population
Census	Pop.	Note	%±
1820	3,724		—
1830	3,434		−7.8%
1840	3,549		3.3%
1850	3,893		9.7%
1860	4,232		8.7%
1870	4,188		−1.0%
1880	4,435		5.9%
1890	4,188		−5.6%
1900	3,758		−10.3%
1910	4,169		10.9%
1920	4,040		−3.1%
1930	4,223		4.5%
1940	4,337		2.7%
1950	4,934		13.8%
1960	6,179		25.2%
1970	7,417		20.0%
1980	7,652		3.2%
1990	7,690		0.5%
2000	7,672		−0.2%
2010	7,975		3.9%
2016 (est.)	7,638	▼	−4.2%
U.S. Decennial Census

As of the census of 2010, there were 7,975 people, 3,255 households, and 2,175 families residing in the town. The population density was 236.6 inhabitants per square mile (91.4/km^{2}). The racial makeup of the town was 96.7% White, 0.8% Black or African American, 0.4% Native American, 0.5% Asian, 0.1% Pacific Islander, 0.2% from other races, and 1.3% from two or more races. Hispanic or Latino of any race were 1.4% of the population.

There were 3,255 households, out of which 27.6% had children under the age of 18 living with them, 50.1% were married couples living together, 11.4% had a female householder with no husband present, and 33.2% were non-families. 25.9% of all households were made up of individuals, and 10.2% had someone living alone who was 65 years of age or older. The average household size was 2.44 and the average family size was 2.92.

In the town, the population was spread out, with 25.0% under the age of 20, 5.6% from 20 to 24, 24.0% from 25 to 44, 30.9% from 45 to 64, and 14.4% who were 65 years of age or older. The median age was 41.7 years. For every 100 females, there were 98.2 males. For every 100 females age 18 and over, there were 96.9 males.

The median income for a household in the town was $47,102, and the median income for a family was $57,770. Males had a median income of $40,742 versus $36,087 for females. The per capita income for the town was $23,569. About 14.5% of families and 16.7% of the population were below the poverty line, including 27.5% of those under age 18 and 8.2% of those age 65 or over.

=== Housing ===
There were 3,543 housing units at an average density of 105.1 per square mile (40.6/km^{2}). 8.1% of housing units were vacant.

There were 3,255 occupied housing units in the town. 2,212 were owner-occupied units (68.0%), while 1,043 were renter-occupied (32.0%). The homeowner vacancy rate was 1.2% of total units. The rental unit vacancy rate was 10.1%.

== Communities and locations in the Town of Palmyra ==
- Cooney Crossing – A location by the west town line on County Road 210.
- East Palmyra – A hamlet near the east town line on County Road 225. The East Palmyra Presbyterian Church was listed on the National Register of Historic Places in 2002.
- Palmyra – The Village of Palmyra on the Erie Canal.
- Red Creek – A stream north of Palmyra village.
- Wide Waters – A long narrow pond in the Erie Canal is partly in the southeast corner of the town.

== Notable people ==
- E. B. Grandin (1806–1845), printer of first edition of the Book of Mormon
- Increase A. Lapham (1811–1875), "father" of the United States Weather Service
- William T. Sampson (1840–1902), Admiral in the Spanish–American War
- Joseph Smith (1805–1844), founder of the Latter Day Saint movement, resided in Palmyra from 1816 to 1825 and again in 1830
- Martin Harris (1783–1875), financier, scribe, and one of three witnesses of the Book of Mormon resided in Palmyra from 1791 to 1831
- Margaret Aldrich Smith (1863–1929), American First Lady of Guam, born in Palmyra
- Henry Wells (1805–1878), founder of American Express and co-founder of Wells Fargo

== See also ==
- Palmyra (village), New York
- Palmyra Speedway
