= National Register of Historic Places listings in Wayne County, New York =

Location of Wayne County in New York

List of the National Register of Historic Places listings in Wayne County, New York

This is intended to be a complete list of properties and districts listed on the National Register of Historic Places in Wayne County, New York. The locations of National Register properties and districts (at least for all showing latitude and longitude coordinates below) may be seen in a map by clicking on "Map of all coordinates".

This National Park Service list is complete through NPS recent listings posted May 1, 2026.

Contents: Counties in New York
Albany (Albany) – Allegany – Bronx – Broome – Cattaraugus – Cayuga – Chautauqua – Chemung – Chenango – Clinton – Columbia – Cortland – Delaware – Dutchess (Poughkeepsie, Rhinebeck) – Erie (Buffalo) – Essex – Franklin – Fulton – Genesee – Greene – Hamilton – Herkimer – Jefferson – Kings – Lewis – Livingston – Madison – Monroe (Rochester) – Montgomery – Nassau – New York (Below 14th Street, 14th to 59th Streets, 59th to 110th Streets, Above 110th Street, Islands) – Niagara (Niagara Falls) – Oneida – Onondaga (Syracuse) – Ontario – Orange – Orleans – Oswego – Otsego – Putnam – Queens – Rensselaer – Richmond – Rockland – St. Lawrence – Saratoga – Schenectady – Schoharie – Schuyler – Seneca – Steuben – Suffolk – Sullivan – Tioga – Tompkins – Ulster – Warren – Washington – Wayne – Westchester (Northern, Southern, New Rochelle, Peekskill, Yonkers) – Wyoming – Yates

== Listings county-wide ==
	Name on the Register	Image	Date listed	Location	City or town	Description
1	Alasa Farms	Alasa Farms	October 16, 2009 (#09000835)	6450 Shaker Rd. 43°12′41″N 76°58′48″W	Alton	
2	J. and E. Baker Cobblestone Farmstead	J. and E. Baker Cobblestone Farmstead	November 7, 1995 (#95001281)	815 Canandaigua Rd. 43°02′04″N 77°18′50″W	Macedon	
3	Brick Church Corners	Brick Church Corners	June 5, 1974 (#74001317)	Jct. of Brick Church and Ontario Center Rds. 43°15′27″N 77°18′21″W	Ontario	
4	Broad Street–Water Street Historic District	Broad Street–Water Street Historic District	August 14, 1973 (#73001284)	Broad and Water Sts. 43°03′45″N 76°59′43″W	Lyons	
5	Charles Bullis House	Charles Bullis House	March 20, 1986 (#86000483)	1727 Canandaigua Rd. 43°04′10″N 77°19′14″W	Macedon	
6	Clyde Downtown Historic District	Clyde Downtown Historic District	December 23, 2019 (#100004803)	Portions of Glasgow St., Caroline St., Columbia St., Sodus St., North & South Park, & West Genesee St. 43°05′03″N 76°52′14″W	Clyde	Core of village that developed around a local park from 1820 on, spurred by Erie Canal
7	Customs House	Customs House	May 6, 1980 (#80002787)	Sentell St. 43°16′01″N 76°59′37″W	Sodus Point	
8	Dipper Dredge No. 3	Dipper Dredge No. 3	December 11, 2007 (#07001257)	1665 Drydock Rd. 43°03′52″N 77°01′10″W	Lyons	
9	East Main Street Commercial Historic District	East Main Street Commercial Historic District	November 21, 1974 (#74001318)	Between Clinton and William-Cuyler Sts. 43°03′49″N 77°13′49″W	Palmyra	
10	East Palmyra Presbyterian Church	East Palmyra Presbyterian Church	December 31, 2002 (#02001651)	2102 Whitbeck Rd. 43°05′02″N 77°08′52″W	East Palmyra	
11	First Methodist Episcopal Church of Walworth	First Methodist Episcopal Church of Walworth	March 27, 2017 (#100000814)	3679 Main St. 43°08′17″N 77°16′23″W	Walworth	Landmark in the community since its 1872 construction
12	First Presbyterian Church of Ontario Center	First Presbyterian Church of Ontario Center	June 3, 1998 (#98000665)	1638 Ridge Rd. 43°13′31″N 77°18′06″W	Ontario Center	
13	Gates Hall and Pultneyville Public Square	Gates Hall and Pultneyville Public Square	March 3, 2000 (#00000177)	Lake Rd. 43°16′48″N 77°11′13″W	Pultneyville	
14	Grace Episcopal Church Complex	Grace Episcopal Church Complex	August 19, 1994 (#94000802)	7–9 Phelps St. and 12 Lawrence St. 43°03′55″N 76°59′25″W	Lyons	
15	H. G. Hotchkiss Essential Oil Company Plant	H. G. Hotchkiss Essential Oil Company Plant	November 2, 1987 (#87001897)	93-95 Water St. 43°03′46″N 76°59′48″W	Lyons	
16	Jackson–Perkins House	Jackson–Perkins House	July 14, 2006 (#06000567)	310 High St. 43°02′39″N 77°05′58″W	Newark	
17	Ambrose S. Lapham House	Ambrose S. Lapham House	September 3, 2014 (#14000541)	352 W. Jackson St. 43°03′38″N 77°14′36″W	Palmyra	1870 Italianate brick house built by local resident who returned after a successful banking career in Detroit
18	LOTUS (schooner)	LOTUS (schooner)	May 10, 1990 (#90000694)	Trestle Landing Marina, Co. Rt. 14 at Sentell Rd. 43°15′59″N 76°59′29″W	Sodus Point	
19	Lyons Downtown Historic District	Lyons Downtown Historic District	March 12, 2018 (#SG100002190)	Broad bounded by Phelps, William, Butternut, Pearl & Canal with portions of Bear, Lawrence, Geneva & Water Sts. 43°03′48″N 76°59′36″W	Lyons	Core of county seat, reflecting 18th century origins, 19th-century growth as canal town and 20th-century industrialization
20	Market Street Historic District	Market Street Historic District	December 8, 1972 (#72000916)	Both sides of Market St. between Canal and Main Sts. 43°03′52″N 77°13′47″W	Palmyra	
21	Methodist Episcopal Church of Butler	Methodist Episcopal Church of Butler	November 24, 1997 (#97001459)	Butler Center Rd., jct. with Washburn Rd. 43°10′06″N 76°46′17″W	Butler Center	
22	New York State Barge Canal	New York State Barge Canal	October 15, 2014 (#14000860)	Linear across county 43°03′55″N 77°14′47″W	Arcadia, Clyde, Galen, Lyons, Newark, Palmyra, Savannah	Successor to Erie Canal approved by state voters in early 20th century to compete with railroads.
23	Palmyra Village Historic District	Palmyra Village Historic District	October 16, 2009 (#09000836)	Portions of Canandaigua, Church, Cuyler, E. and W. Jackson, Market, E. and W. Main Sts. 43°03′50″N 77°14′00″W	Palmyra	
24	Ezra T. Phelps Farm Complex	Ezra T. Phelps Farm Complex	August 13, 1997 (#97000843)	4365 E. Williamson Rd. 43°09′13″N 77°09′51″W	Marion	
25	Preston-Gaylord Cobblestone Farmhouse	Preston-Gaylord Cobblestone Farmhouse	December 11, 2009 (#09001088)	7563 Lake Rd. 43°15′57″N 77°01′28″W	Sodus	
26	Pultneyville Historic District	Pultneyville Historic District	September 11, 1985 (#85002325)	Sections of Lake Rd. and Jay St. 43°16′48″N 77°10′54″W	Pultneyville	
27	Red Brick Church	Red Brick Church	December 8, 1997 (#97001527)	Jct. of Brick Church Rd. and S. Geneva Rd. 43°11′58″N 77°00′42″W	Sodus Center	
28	Reed Manufacturing Company		January 22, 2025 (#100010976)	130-132 Harrison Street; 43°02′59″N 77°05′34″W	Newark	
29	Roe Cobblestone Schoolhouse	Roe Cobblestone Schoolhouse	September 17, 2008 (#08000920)	12397 Van Vleck Rd. 43°11′25″N 76°47′00″W	Butler	
30	Smith-Ely Mansion	Smith-Ely Mansion	February 10, 1992 (#92000032)	39 W. Genesee St. 43°05′07″N 76°52′25″W	Clyde	
31	Sodus Point Lighthouse	Sodus Point Lighthouse	October 8, 1976 (#76001288)	Off NY 14 at Lake Ontario; 43°16′25″N 76°59′12″W	Sodus Point	
32	St. Peter, (Shipwreck)	St. Peter, (Shipwreck)	March 22, 2004 (#04000226)	Address Restricted; 43°18′42″N 77°07′52″W	Pultneyville	
33	Isaac Shipley House	Isaac Shipley House	November 15, 2022 (#100008383)	7470 Lake Ave. 43°16′06″N 77°11′04″W	Williamson vicinity	
34	Third Methodist Episcopal Church of Sodus		October 30, 2024 (#100009875)	56-58 West Main Street; 43°14′10″N 77°03′57″W	Sodus	
35	Towar–Ennis Farmhouse and Barn Complex	Towar–Ennis Farmhouse and Barn Complex	October 16, 2009 (#09000967)	265 NY-14; 43°01′12″N 76°59′12″W	Lyons	
36	US Post Office-Clyde	US Post Office-Clyde	November 17, 1988 (#88002472)	26 S. Park St. 43°05′01″N 76°52′16″W	Clyde	
37	US Post Office-Lyons	US Post Office-Lyons	May 11, 1989 (#88002349)	1-5 Pearl St. 43°03′46″N 76°59′37″W	Lyons	
38	US Post Office-Newark	US Post Office-Newark	May 11, 1989 (#88002366)	300 S. Main St. 43°02′37″N 77°05′43″W	Newark	
39	Walling Cobblestone Tavern	Walling Cobblestone Tavern	March 17, 1994 (#94000173)	7851 Ridge Rd., Hamlet of Wallington; 43°13′18″N 77°00′44″W	Sodus	
40	Wallington Cobblestone Schoolhouse District No. 8	Wallington Cobblestone Schoolhouse District No. 8	March 17, 1994 (#94000172)	6135 N. Geneva Rd., Hamlet of Wallington; 43°13′23″N 77°00′48″W	Sodus	
41	Wolcott Square Historic District	Wolcott Square Historic District	May 17, 2001 (#00001692)	W. Main, Park, and New Hartford Sts. 43°13′12″N 76°48′58″W	Wolcott	
42	Zion Episcopal Church	Zion Episcopal Church	November 29, 1996 (#96001388)	100-120 Main St. 43°03′47″N 77°14′00″W	Palmyra	

== See also ==
- National Register of Historic Places listings in New York
