= Ganargua Creek =

Ganargua Creek Mud Creek
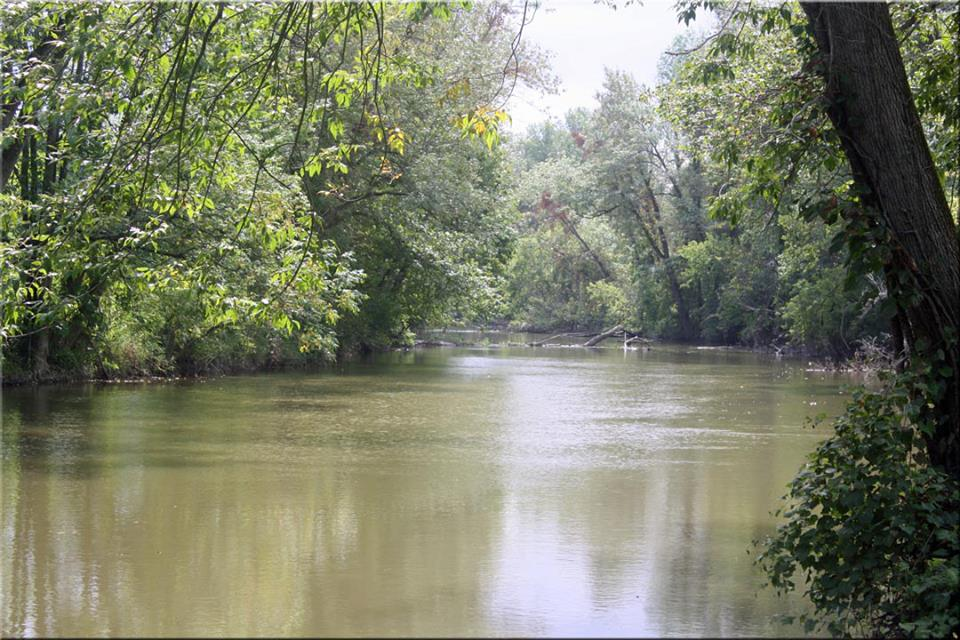
- Ganargua Creek, looking upstream, from Norsen Bridge Park near Newark, New York.

Location
- Country: United States
- State: New York
- Region: Finger Lakes

Physical characteristics
- Source: Confluence of Mud Creek, Fish Creek and Great Brook
  - location: Victor, Ontario County, New York, United States
  - coordinates: 42°58′48″N 77°23′14″W
  - elevation: 547 ft (167 m)
- Mouth: Erie Canal
  - location: Lyons, Wayne County, New York, United States
  - coordinates: 43°03′48″N 77°00′11″W
  - elevation: 397 ft (121 m)
- Length: 34 mi (55 km)
- Basin size: 118 mi^{2} (310 km^{2})
- Discharge
  - location: Lyons, New York

Basin features
- Tributaries
  - left: Red Creek (two different waterways), Butternut Run
  - right: Trap Brook, Hathaway Brook (into Erie Canal)

Ganargua Creek, also known as Mud Creek, is a main tributary which feeds the Erie Canal and Clyde River in Wayne County, New York, United States. The creek begins just east of the village of Victor in nearby Ontario County and meanders approximately 34 miles (55 kilometers) from west to east before emptying into the Erie Canal in the hamlet of Lyons. Ganargua Creek is actually split into two sections as it runs concurrent with the Erie Canal for about 3 miles (5 kilometers) near the village of Palmyra. Numerous tributaries feed Ganargua Creek along its route.

Ganargua Creek is part of the Clyde River watershed which feeds the Seneca River. From there, the Seneca River enters the Oswego River and into Lake Ontario.

The name Ganargua has been translated as "where the village sprang up" or "a village suddenly sprang up", and the name was given to by the creek by the region's original Iroquois inhabitants. The nickname of 'Mud Creek' is given due to the murkiness of the water. Ganargua Creek is a primary spot for fishing, canoeing and kayaking. Even though a channel has been cut through the foliage, paddling trips on the creek can be difficult due to a number of log jams from fallen trees as a result of ice storms which hit the greater Rochester area in 1991 and 2003. At this time the creek is nearly impassable.

== Course of southern section ==
The 13-mile (21-kilometer) southern section of Ganargua Creek, known as the "Upper" on watershed documents, begins in the Ontario County town of Victor at the confluence of Mud Creek, Fish Creek and Great Brook near the Ontario Central Railroad line between NY Route 96 and Plaster Mill Road. The primary source feeding Ganargua Creek is Mud Creek which starts on the southern end of Ontario County near Bristol Mountain. From the confluence, Ganargua Creek flows north and east through the western end of the town of Farmington, including passing under the New York State Thruway, before entering Wayne County. It continues in snake-like fashion through the town and village of Macedon until its conjunction with the Erie Canal just east of Lock #29 in Palmyra. The creek passes through the remains of the Palmyra Aqueduct (built 1857) prior to the canal. From there, Ganargua Creek runs concurrent with the Erie Canal for roughly three miles before breaking off and continuing northeast.

== Course of northern section ==
The 18-mile (29-kilometer) northern section of Ganargua Creek, known as the "Lower" on watershed documents, begins in the Wayne County town of Palmyra at a spillway off the Erie Canal near Swifts Landing Park west of Galloway Road along NY Route 31. Access to the area can be made from the Erie Canalway Trail via Swifts Landing Park on Hogback Road. Ganargua Creek runs northeast towards the community of East Palmyra and into the town of Arcadia, following the CSX Transportation railroad line. It will pass just north of the village of Newark and continue northeast along the Ontario Midland Railroad line to just south of the community of Fairville Station at Norsen Bridge Park. Ganargua Creek will then meander its way back southeast along Bauer-Van Wickle Road and Layton Street into the town and hamlet of Lyons where it will finally enter the Erie Canal at Miller's Marina near Abbey Park west of Lock #27. This section between Palmyra and Lyons is where the most paddling of Ganargua Creek occurs as the other section is quite shallow and unsuitable.

== Tributaries ==
There are eight primary tributaries feeding Ganargua Creek which are part of its watershed although other minor waterways directly enter it as well. First are Mud Creek, Fish Creek and Great Brook which meet together to form Ganargua Creek near Victor. Further down the creek, from the right include Trap Brook in Macedon and Hathaway Brook in Palmyra which actually empties into the Erie Canal. On the left side are two waterways named Red Creek. The western one travels through the towns of Walworth, Macedon and Palmyra into Ganargua Creek at the spillway. Not far from there, the eastern one runs through the towns of Marion and Palmyra and enters Ganargua Creek near East Palmyra. The eighth tributary is Butternut Run in the town of Lyons.

== History ==
Use of Ganargua Creek dates back to pre-colonial times. It was a primary stopover point for the Iroquois on their trade routes. Mormonism founder Joseph Smith also had an interest in the creek after hearing a speech from Seneca Indian Chief Red Jacket at Palmyra in 1822. Before the Erie Canal was constructed in 1817, Ganargua Creek originally met the Canandaigua Outlet in Lyons to form the Clyde River.

== Parks & Trails ==
Some parks and hiking trails are located along Ganargua Creek, primarily in Wayne County, including Ganargua Creek Meadow Preserve in Macedon, Gravino Park in Macedon, Aqueduct Park in Palmyra, the Erie Canalway Trail in Palmyra, Swifts Landing Park near Palmyra, Norsen Bridge Park near Newark and Abbey Park in Lyons.

== See also ==
- List of rivers of New York
