= Canandaigua Outlet =

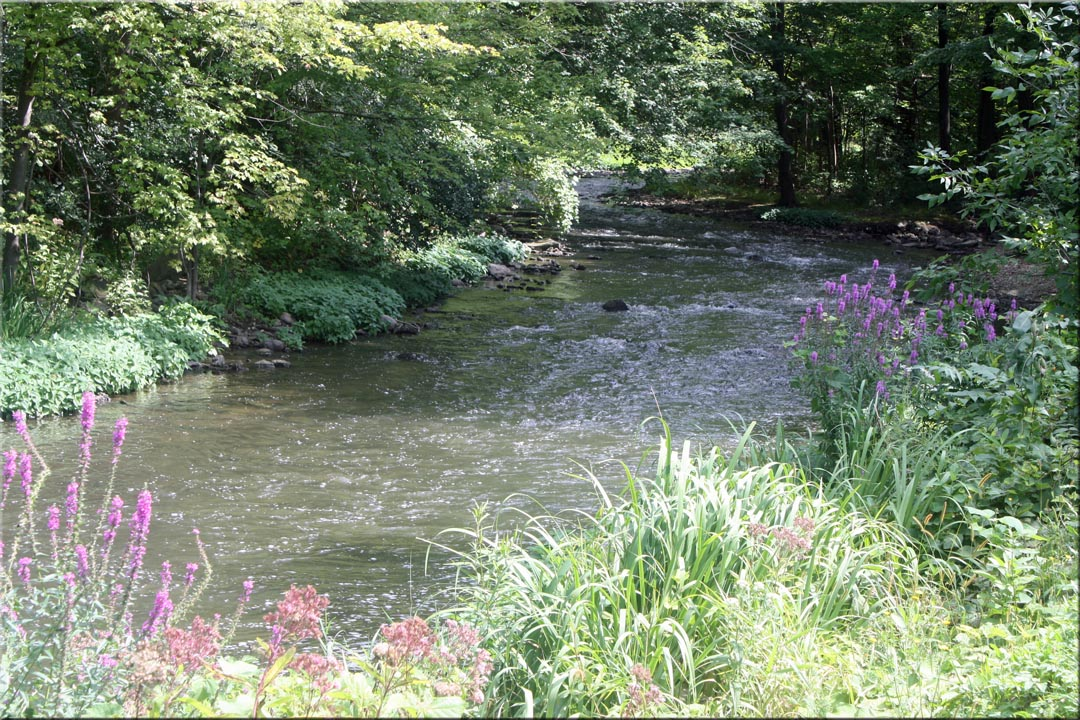
- The Canandaigua Outlet, looking upstream, from Jones-Blunt Park in Shortsville, New York.

Location
- Country: United States
- State: New York
- Region: Finger Lakes

Physical characteristics
- Source: Canandaigua Lake
  - location: Canandaigua, Ontario County
  - coordinates: 42°52′28″N 77°15′44″W
  - elevation: 688 ft (210 m)
- Mouth: Erie Canal (Clyde River)
  - location: Lyons, Wayne County
  - coordinates: 43°03′41″N 76°59′47″W
  - elevation: 384 ft (117 m)
- Length: 34 mi (55 km)
- Basin size: 188 sq mi (490 km^{2})
- Discharge
  - location: Lyons, New York

Basin features
- Tributaries
  - left: Padelford Brook, Black Creek
  - right: Freshour Creek, Flint Creek

The Canandaigua Outlet is a main tributary which feeds the Erie Canal and Clyde River in Wayne County, New York, United States. It begins at Canandaigua Lake in nearby Ontario County and flows approximately 34 miles (55 km) north before emptying into the Erie Canal in the hamlet of Lyons. A number of tributaries feed the Canandaigua Outlet along its route. It is the primary outflow for Canandaigua Lake.

The Canandaigua Outlet is part of the Clyde River watershed which feeds the Seneca River. From there, the Seneca River enters the Oswego River and into Lake Ontario. It is used for fishing as well as whitewater canoeing, kayaking and rafting.

== Course ==
The Canandaigua Outlet begins as a natural outflow on the north end of Canandaigua Lake in the city of Canandaigua. From there, the outlet travels northeast past the Muar Lakes through the town of Canandaigua and into the neighboring town of Hopewell. A man-made feeder canal also enters the outlet from Canandaigua Lake to help with drainage. Both outlets from the lake are controlled by gates which are managed by the City of Canandaigua. Passing through the community of Chapin, the Canandaigua Outlet continues north through the villages of Shortsville and Manchester. Following the New York State Thruway, the outlet heads east through the town of Manchester passing just north of the village of Clifton Springs and into the community of Gypsum. Continuing on through the town and village of Phelps, the Canandaigua Outlet turns back north towards Wayne County. It passes through the community of Alloway in the town of Lyons before entering the Erie Canal at Lock #27 along Leach Road in the hamlet of Lyons, just north of NY Route 31.

=== Tributaries ===
There are six primary tributaries feeding the Canandaigua Outlet which are part of its watershed although other minor waterways directly enter it as well. Tributaries from the right include Freshour Creek in Hopewell, Sulphur Creek in Clifton Springs, and Rocky Run in the towns of Hopewell and Manchester. Flint Creek, which begins in Steuben County, also enters from the right after traveling through Yates County and through the towns of Gorham, Seneca and Phelps in Ontario County. On the left side is Padelford Brook in the towns of Canandaigua and Manchester along with Black Creek in the towns of Farmington and Manchester.

=== Places of interest ===
Three parks are located along the Canandaigua Outlet in Ontario County: Kershaw Park and Lagoon Park in Canandaigua and Jones-Blunt Park in Shortsville. The annual Wild Water Derby takes place every April in Shortsville and Manchester for class II & III whitewater canoeing, kayaking and rafting. Cheerful Valley Campground is also located near the Canandaigua Outlet on NY Route 14 in the town of Phelps between Lyons and Geneva.

== History ==
Use of the Canandaigua Outlet dates back to pre-colonial times. Before the Erie Canal was constructed in 1817, the Canandaigua Outlet merged with Ganargua Creek in Lyons to form the Clyde River.

In 1911, a train passing on a bridge over this outlet derailed, resulting in 29 deaths.

== See also ==
- List of rivers of New York
