= Alloway, New York =

Coordinates: 43°01′25″N 76°59′19″W

Alloway within New York

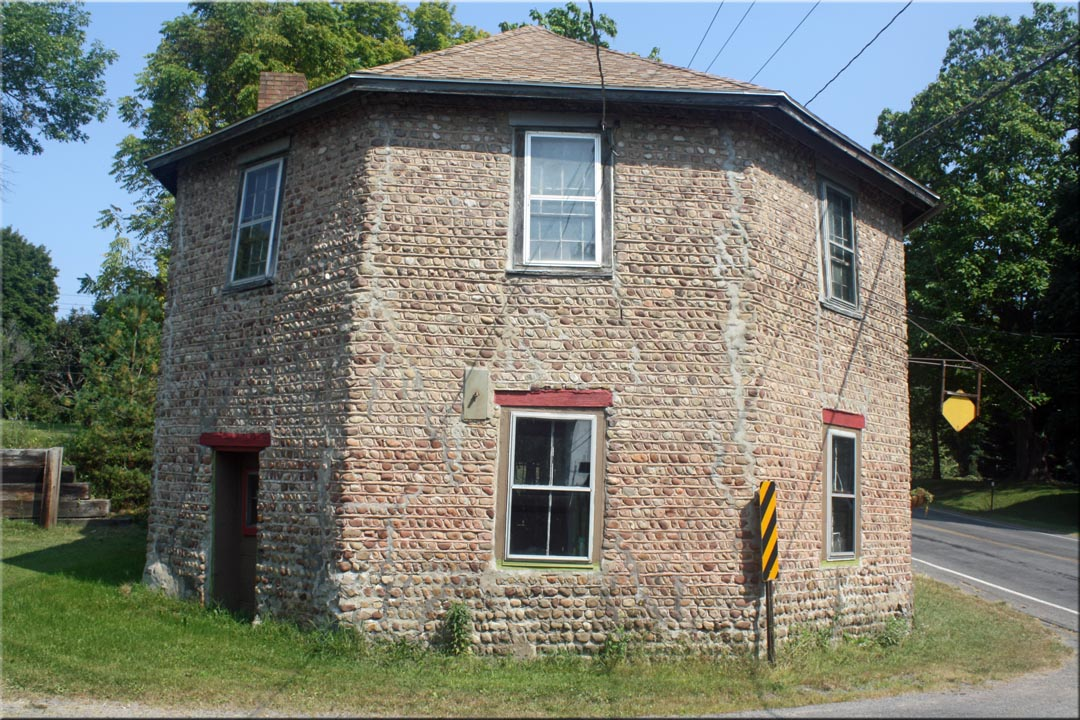
Octagonal cobblestone blacksmith shop in Alloway

Alloway is a hamlet in the Town of Lyons, Wayne County, New York, United States near the Ontario County line. It is located three miles (5 km) south of the hamlet of Lyons, at an elevation of 433 feet (132 m). The primary cross roads where the hamlet is located are N.Y. Route 14, Alloway Road (CR 339) and Sohn Alloway Road.

Alloway was named for Alloa, Scotland, the original home of Captain Henry Towar, who built a gristmill, a sawmill, and two stores in the community.

A historic octagonal cobblestone building (built 1832), formerly a blacksmith shop, is located on the corner of Alloway Road and Water Street in the hamlet, just off N.Y. Route 14. There was a land office (built c. 1835), also located in Alloway. It has since been moved to the Genesee Country Village & Museum in Mumford, near Rochester.

Towar–Ennis Farmhouse and Barn Complex is listed on the National Register of Historic Places.
