= Clyde River (New York) =

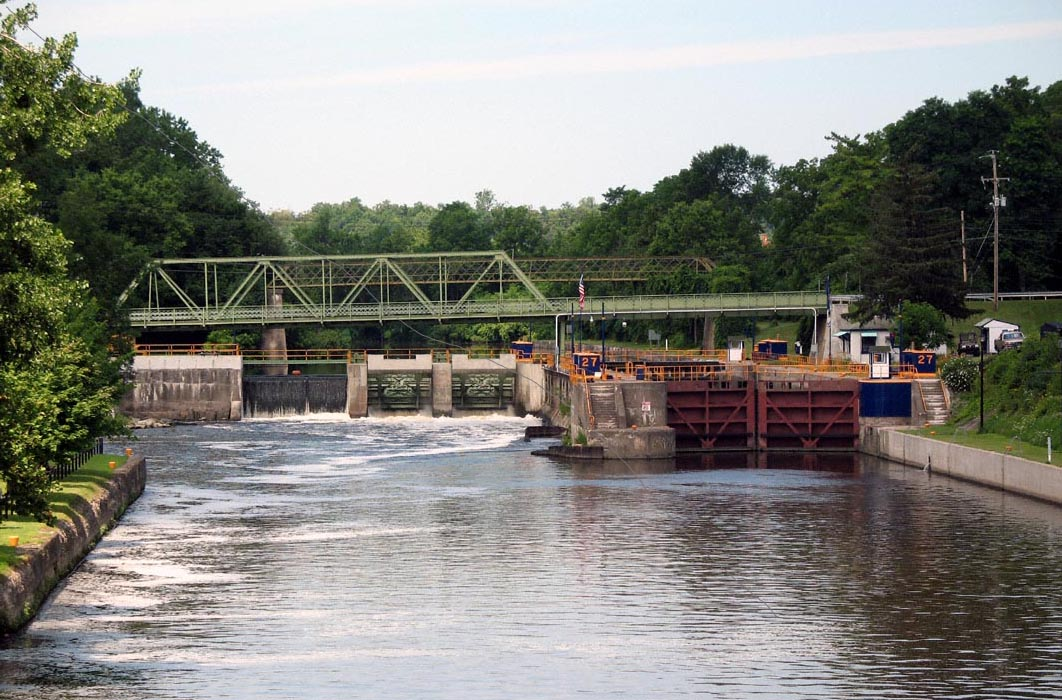
- The Clyde River begins at Erie Canal Lock #27 in Lyons, New York. This view is looking upstream towards the lock.

- Location of the mouth within New York Clyde River (New York) (the United States)

Location
- Country: United States
- State: New York
- Region: Finger Lakes

Physical characteristics
- Source: Confluence of the Canandaigua Outlet, Ganargua Creek and Erie Canal at Lock #27
  - location: Lyons, Wayne County, New York, United States
  - coordinates: 43°03′43.08″N 76°59′45.92″W
  - elevation: 385 ft (117 m)
- Mouth: Seneca River
  - location: Tyre, Seneca County, New York, United States
  - coordinates: 42°59′57.69″N 76°43′50.88″W
  - elevation: 374 ft (114 m)
- Length: 27 mi (43 km)
- Basin size: 191 sq mi (490 km^{2})
- Discharge
  - location: Lyons, New York

Basin features
- Tributaries
  - left: Black Brook (into Erie Canal), Melvin Brook (into Erie Canal)
  - right: Pond Brook, White Brook

The Clyde River is a main tributary which feeds the Seneca River in Seneca County, New York, United States. It begins at the hamlet of Lyons in nearby Wayne County and meanders for approximately 27 miles (43 kilometers) from west to east before emptying into the Seneca River in the town of Tyre at Montezuma National Wildlife Refuge. Much of the original river has been channeled through to form part of the Erie Canal. A number of tributaries feed the Clyde River along its route.

The Clyde River is part of the Seneca River watershed which feeds the Oswego River. From there, the Oswego River enters Lake Ontario. It is a primary spot for fishing, flatwater canoeing and kayaking.

== Course ==
The Clyde River officially begins in the Wayne County hamlet of Lyons at the confluence of the Canandaigua Outlet and Erie Canal, just east of Lock #27. Nearby Ganargua Creek is also part of the source feeding the Clyde River which empties into the Erie Canal 1/3 mile west of the lock. From there, the Clyde River either runs concurrent or beside the path of the Erie Canal, passing through the towns of Lyons and Galen as well as the village of Clyde, all the way to its end at Montezuma National Wildlife Refuge where it meets the Seneca River in the Seneca County town of Tyre.

Notable spurs from the Erie Canal include a winding section heading northeast along River Road through the Marengo Marsh between the community of Marengo and the village of Clyde.

Due to its lack of significant current, this particular section of the Clyde River is where most of the flatwater canoeing and kayaking occurs. Sometimes, the Erie Canal is used with the river as a loop-around by paddlers between Lyons and Clyde.

Another section of the Clyde River runs southeast on and off the canal below Lock #26 from Bentley Road in the town of Galen to the Montezuma National Wildlife Refuge near NY Route 89 in the town of Tyre.

== Tributaries ==
There are six primary tributaries feeding the Clyde which are part of its watershed although other minor waterways directly enter it as well.

First are the Canandaigua Outlet and Ganargua Creek which are part of the confluence with the Erie Canal to form the Clyde River in Lyons. Further down the river, from the right are Pond Brook passing through the Seneca County town of Junius and the town of Galen in Wayne County as well as White Brook wandering through the Montezuma National Wildlife Refuge in Tyre. On the left side is Black Brook which actually empties into the Erie Canal. It travels through the towns of Lyons, Rose, and Galen.

Melvin Brook is also nearby, just west of Clyde, which originally flowed into the old section of the Erie Canal but is still part of the Clyde River watershed.

== History ==
Use of the Clyde River dates back to pre-colonial times. Before the Erie Canal was constructed in 1817, the Canandaigua Outlet and Ganargua Creek met in the village of Lyons to form the Clyde River.

== Places of interest ==
Places of interest on the Clyde River include the Marengo Marsh in the town of Galen and the Montezuma National Wildlife Refuge in the town of Tyre. There are also two parks which are located near the Clyde River and Erie Canal, both in the town of Galen, Lock Berlin Park and Black Brook Park off NY Route 31 west of Clyde. Nature and hiking trails are in the area as well.

== See also ==
- List of rivers of New York
