= Marion (CDP), New York =

Marion, New York
- Hamlet and CDP
- Location within the state of New York
- Coordinates: 43°08′31″N 77°11′38″W
- Country: United States
- State: New York
- County: Wayne
- Town: Marion

Area
  - Total: 3.06 sq mi (7.92 km^{2})
  - Land: 3.05 sq mi (7.91 km^{2})
  - Water: 0.0077 sq mi (0.02 km^{2})
- Elevation: 479 ft (146 m)

Population (2020)
  - Total: 1,432
  - Density: 469.1/sq mi (181.11/km^{2})
- Time zone: UTC-5 (Eastern (EST))
  - Summer (DST): UTC-4 (EDT)
- ZIP Code: 14505
- Area codes: 315 and 680
- FIPS code: 36-45634
- GNIS feature ID: 2631642

Marion is a hamlet (and census-designated place) located in the Town of Marion, Wayne County, New York, United States. The population was 1,511 at the 2010 census. Government offices for the Town of Marion are located in the hamlet.

Marion is home to Seneca Foods, a food processing and distribution company.

== Geography ==
Marion is located at 43°08′31″N 77°11′38″W.

According to the United States Census Bureau, the CDP has a total area of 3.1 square miles (8.0 km^{2}), all land.

Marion is located off N.Y. Route 21. The primary intersection in the hamlet is at Main Street (CR 216) and Buffalo Street (CR 207).

== Demographics ==
Historical population
Census	Pop.	Note	%±
2020	1,432		—
U.S. Decennial Census

As of the census of 2010, there were 1,511 people, 604 households, and 389 families residing in the CDP. The population density was 487.4 people per square mile (188.2 people/km^{2}). The racial makeup of the CDP was 95.4% White, 0.9% Black or African American, 0.6% Native American, 0.5% Asian, 0.0% Pacific Islander, 1.1% from other races, and 1.6% from two or more races. Hispanic or Latino of any race were 3.4% of the population.

There were 604 households, out of which 32.6% had children under the age of 18 living with them, 46.5% were married couples living together, 12.4% had a female householder with no husband present, and 35.6% were non-families. 28.6% of all households were made up of individuals, and 12.9% had someone living alone who was 65 years of age or older. The average household size was 2.49 and the average family size was 3.08.

In the CDP, the population was spread out, with 29.1% under the age of 20, 5.8% from 20 to 24, 25.6% from 25 to 44, 26.7% from 45 to 64, and 13.0% who were 65 years of age or older. The median age was 37.8 years. For every 100 females, there were 92.2 males. For every 100 females age 18 and over, there were 92.4 males.

The median income for a household in the CDP was $44,444, and the median income for a family was $68,229. Males had a median income of $55,694 versus $32,200 for females. The per capita income for the CDP was $23,438. About 12.8% of families and 10.8% of the population were below the poverty line, including 9.9% of those under age 18 and 16.6% of those age 65 or over.

=== Housing ===
There were 643 housing units at an average density of 207.4 per square mile (80.1/km^{2}). 6.1% of housing units were vacant.

There were 604 occupied housing units in the CDP. 387 were owner-occupied units (64.1%), while 217 were renter-occupied (35.9%). The homeowner vacancy rate was 1.5% of total units. The rental unit vacancy rate was 5.2%.
