= Lehigh Valley train wreck =

Railway bridge accident

Details
- Date: August 25, 1911; ~12:00 pm
- Location: Near Manchester, New York
- Coordinates: 42°57′45″N 77°13′39″W
- Country: United States
- Operator: Lehigh Valley Railroad
- Incident type: Derailment
- Cause: Broken rail

Statistics
- Trains: 1
- Deaths: 29
- Injured: 62

The Lehigh Valley train wreck was a 1911 train derailment that occurred as a locomotive was passing over a bridge. Twenty-nine people would perish after the passenger cars fell into the Canandaigua Outlet below.

== Background ==
Train no. 4 had left Buffalo heading towards Philadelphia. The no. 4 engine was carrying fourteen cars: an express car, a mail car, a baggage car, one sleeper car, one parlor car, one dining car, and eight coaches.

While the train was running slightly behind schedule, the engineer was following all appropriate orders. The train signals had indicated that the speed be reduced to twenty-five miles per hour, with which the engineer complied.

Many of the passengers on board were Civil War veterans who were returning from a GAR reunion.

== Accident ==
As the train passed over a bridge built over the Canandaigua outlet, a broken rail caused several of the coaches to plummet over the edge and into the river below. The locomotive had managed to pass the section of broken track without derailing, as had several of the train cars. However, the dining car and sleeping car fell down the embankment, followed by coaches no. 237 and 293. It was in these two passenger coaches where the majority of the fatalities occurred.

== Rescue and recovery ==
Eyewitnesses to the disaster were on scene immediately and were the first to initiate rescue services. Removal of bodies began instantly with many rescuers not initially able to differentiate if the bodies were corpses or if they were of individuals who had merely fainted.

The dead would be taken to a furniture store in Shortsville and placed in the basement Ultimately, 29 would die either in the initial derailment or in the passing days as a result of their injuries. An additional 62 were injured and treated.

== Memorial ==
In 2022, the William G. Pomeroy Foundation established a memorial on the banks, 500 feet from where the accident had occurred.
