= Broad Street–Water Street Historic District =

Historic district in New York, United States

- U.S. National Register of Historic Places
- U.S. Historic district
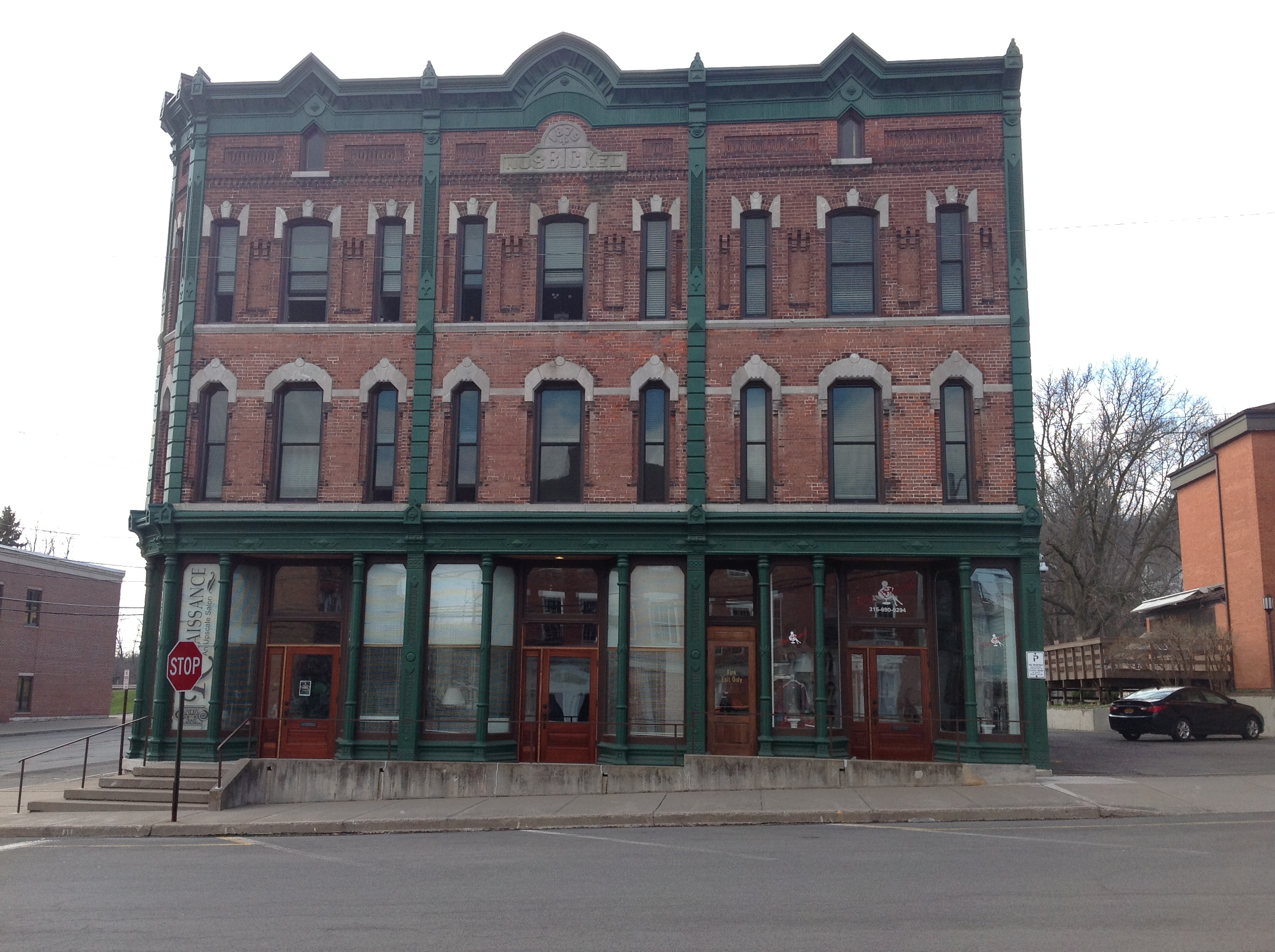
- Broad and Water Street Historic District, April 2013

- Location within New York Location within the United States
- Location: Broad and Water Sts., Lyons, New York
- Coordinates: 43°3′45″N 76°59′43″W
- Area: 12 acres (4.9 ha)
- NRHP reference No.: 73001284
- Added to NRHP: August 14, 1973

Broad Street–Water Street Historic District is a national historic district located at Lyons in Wayne County, New York. It includes 25 contributing buildings. The district consists of a T-shaped commercial area that encompasses a section of the Erie Canal and includes structures dating from the 1830s to 1890s.

It was listed on the National Register of Historic Places in 1973.
