= Ezra T. Phelps Farm Complex =

Historic house in New York, United States

- U.S. National Register of Historic Places
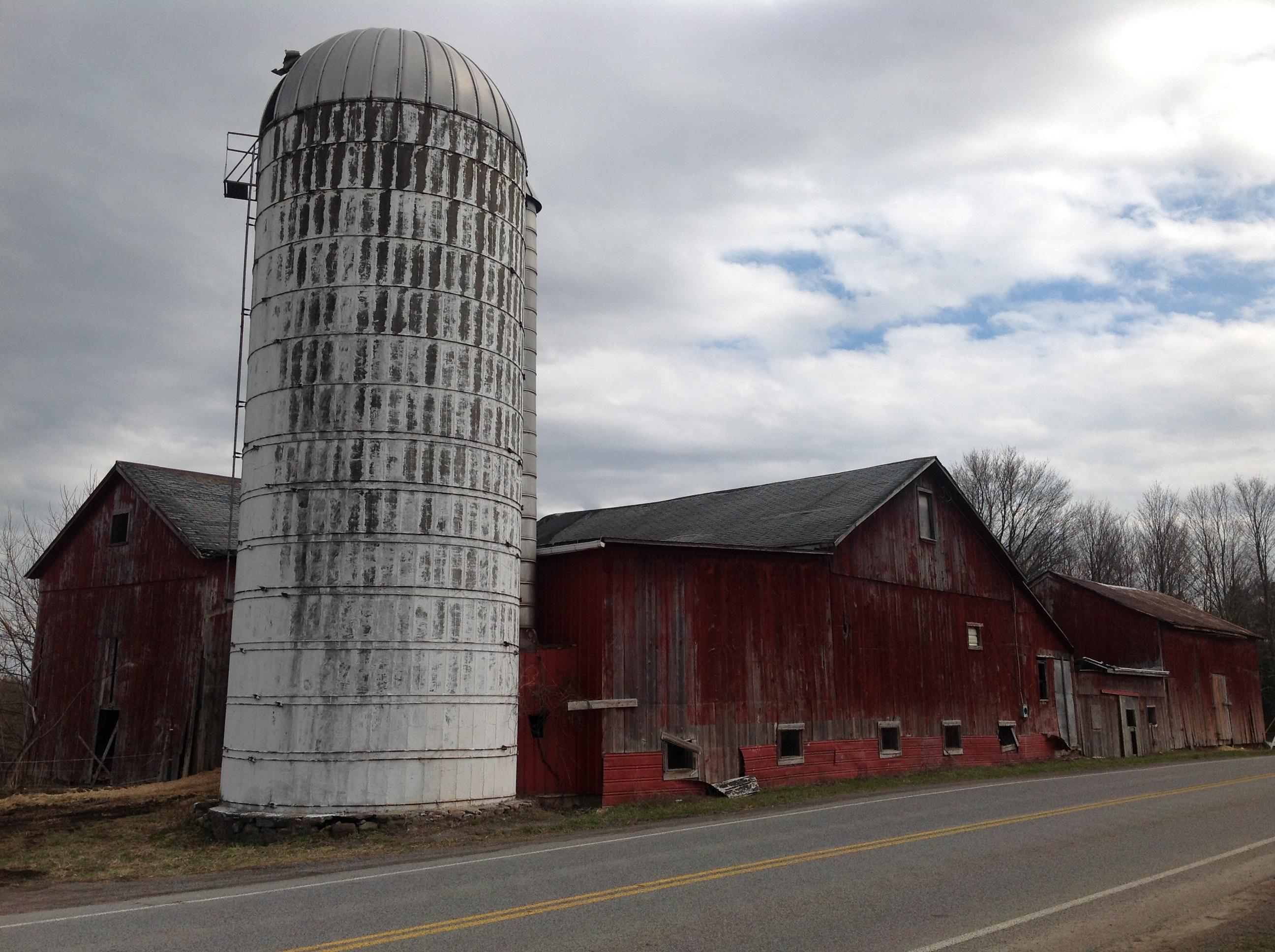
- Ezra T. Phelps Barn, April 2013

- Location within New York Location within the United States
- Nearest city: Marion, New York
- Coordinates: 43°9′13″N 77°9′51″W
- Area: 15 acres (6.1 ha)
- Built: 1840
- Architect: Phelps, Ezra T.
- Architectural style: Greek Revival
- NRHP reference No.: 97000843
- Added to NRHP: August 13, 1997

Ezra T. Phelps Farm Complex is a historic home and farm complex located at Marion in Wayne County, New York. The property includes the farmhouse, a timber framed barn, and brick smokehouse. The farmhouse was built prior to 1843 and is a front gabled Greek Revival structure with side and back wings.

It was listed on the National Register of Historic Places in 1997.
