= Dipper Dredge No. 3 =

- U.S. National Register of Historic Places
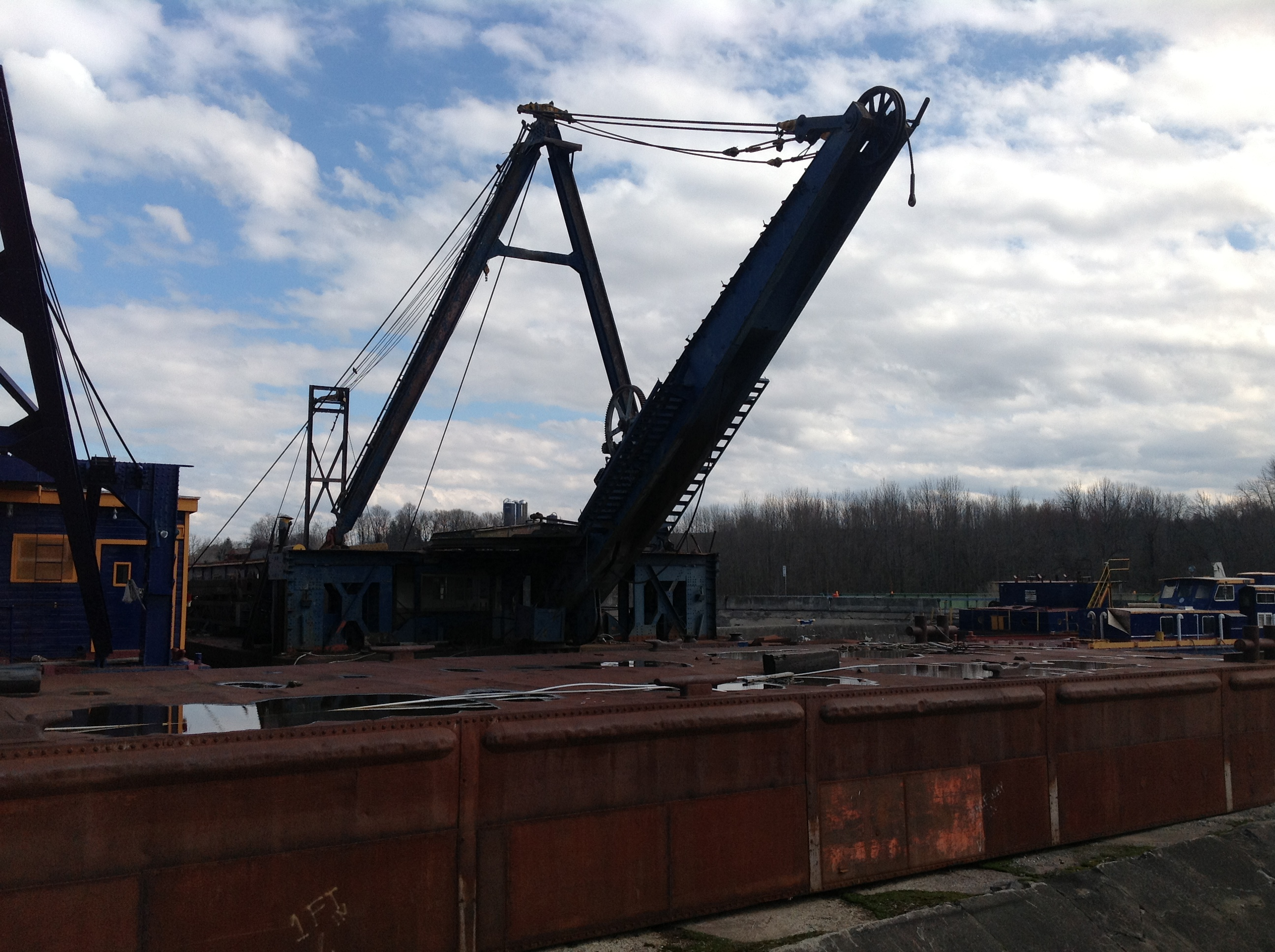
- Dipper Dredge No. 3, April 2013

- Location within New York Location within the United States
- Location: 1665 Drydock Rd., Lyons, New York
- Coordinates: 43°3′52″N 77°1′10″W
- Area: less than one acre
- Built: 1909
- Architect: Bucyrus Co.
- Architectural style: Steam dredge
- NRHP reference No.: 07001257
- Added to NRHP: December 11, 2007

Dipper Dredge No. 3 is a historic dredge located at Lyons in Wayne County, New York. It is a steam-powered floating dredge located at the dry dock of the New York State Barge Canal at Lyons. The dredge consists of a rectangular riveted steel hull built in 1929 and measuring 110 feet in length, 34 feet in beam, and 7 feet in draft. The bow of the hull is squared and vertical. The stern is squared but inclined in the manner of a scow. In 1946, fuel bunkers were added to the sides of the hull. Much of the machinery, including the steam engines, was built in 1909.

It was listed on the National Register of Historic Places in 2007.
