= Ambrose S. Lapham House =

Historic house in New York, United States

- U.S. National Register of Historic Places
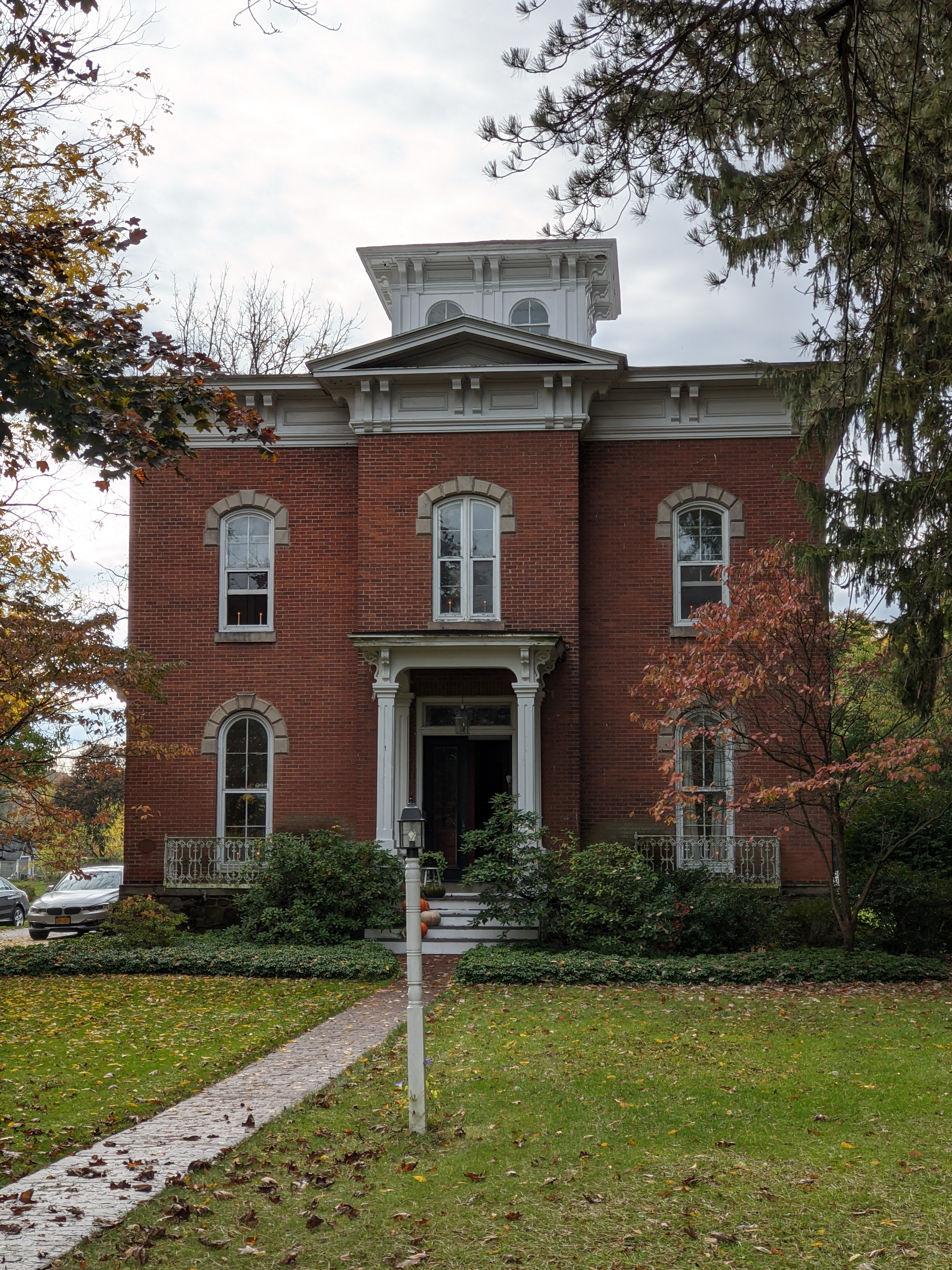

- Location within New York Location within the United States
- Location: 352 W. Jackson St., Palmyra, New York
- Coordinates: 43°3′38″N 77°14′36″W
- Area: 1.63 acres (0.66 ha)
- Built: c. 1869
- Architectural style: Italianate
- NRHP reference No.: 14000541
- Added to NRHP: September 3, 2014

Ambrose S. Lapham House is a historic home located at Palmyra, Wayne County, New York. It was built about 1869, and is a large 2 1/2-story, Italianate style brick dwelling. It has a low hipped roof with overhanging eaves and decorative brackets topped by a cupola. Also on the property are the contributing late-19th century wood-framed barn with its historic cupola, doors and horse stalls; a rustic late-19th century gazebo; and four extant historic brick piers along the property line.

It was listed on the National Register of Historic Places in 2014.
