= Grace Episcopal Church Complex (Lyons, New York) =

Historic church in New York, United States

- U.S. National Register of Historic Places
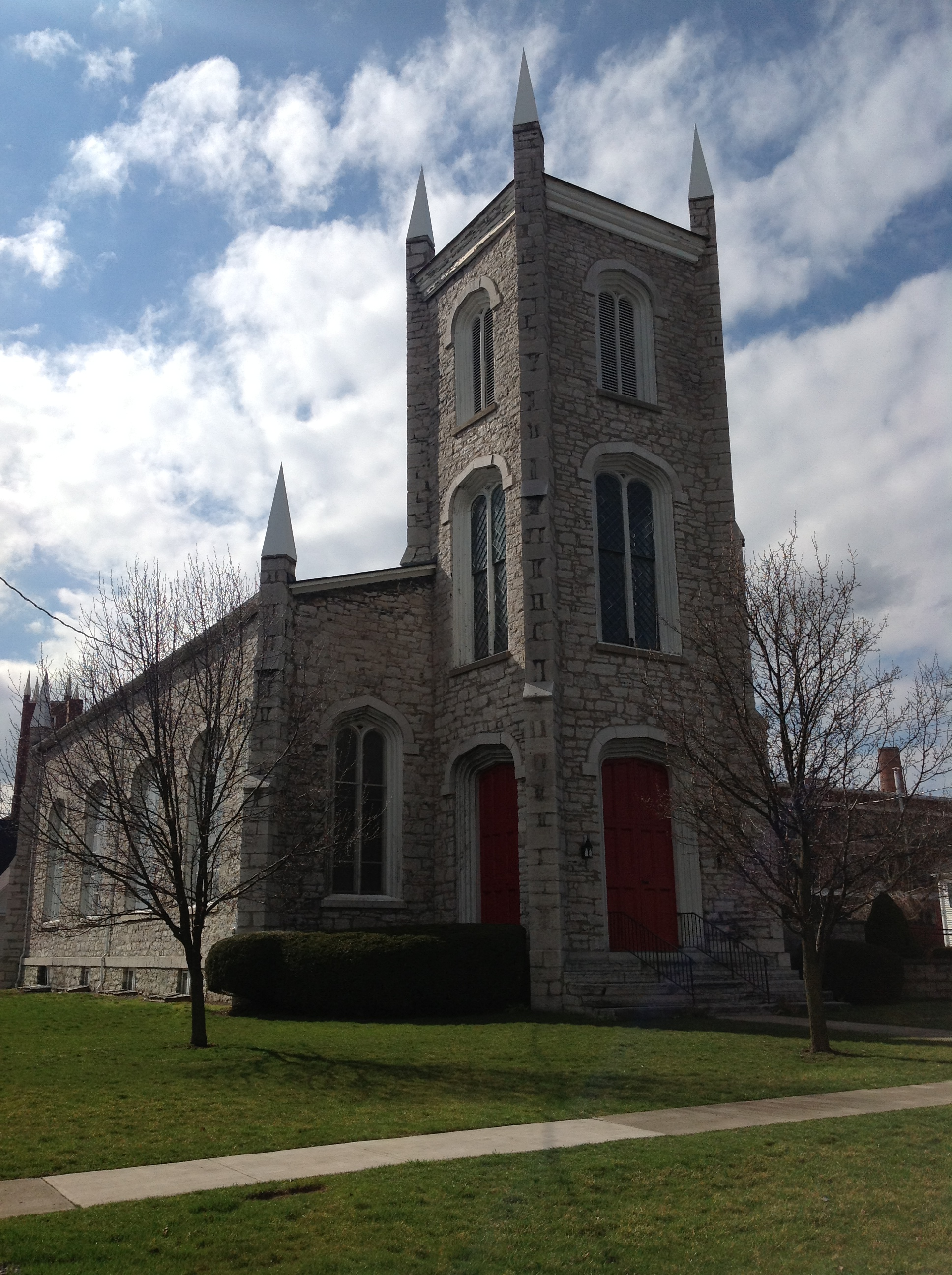
- Grace Episcopal Church, April 2013

- Location within New York Location within the United States
- Location: 7-9 Phelps St. and 12 Lawrence St., Lyons, New York
- Coordinates: 43°3′55″N 76°59′25″W
- Area: less than one acre
- Built: 1833
- Architect: Walton, James D., et al; Upjohn, Richard, et al
- Architectural style: Gothic Revival, Greek Revival, Queen Anne
- NRHP reference No.: 94000802
- Added to NRHP: August 19, 1994

Grace Episcopal Church Complex is a historic Episcopal church complex located at Lyons in Wayne County, New York. The complex consists of a contributing stone church building begun in 1838, a contributing frame rectory begun about 1833, and a contributing parish house built in 1887–1888. The church building is Gothic Revival in style and constructed of rubble limestone walls with cut limestone trim. The rectory is an irregularly massed two story, wood-frame building incorporating a former private residence built at this site about 1833 in the vernacular late Federal / early Greek Revival style. The parish house is a single story, frame building designed in the Queen Anne style.

It was listed on the National Register of Historic Places in 1994.
