= Pultneyville, New York =

- Hamlet and CDP
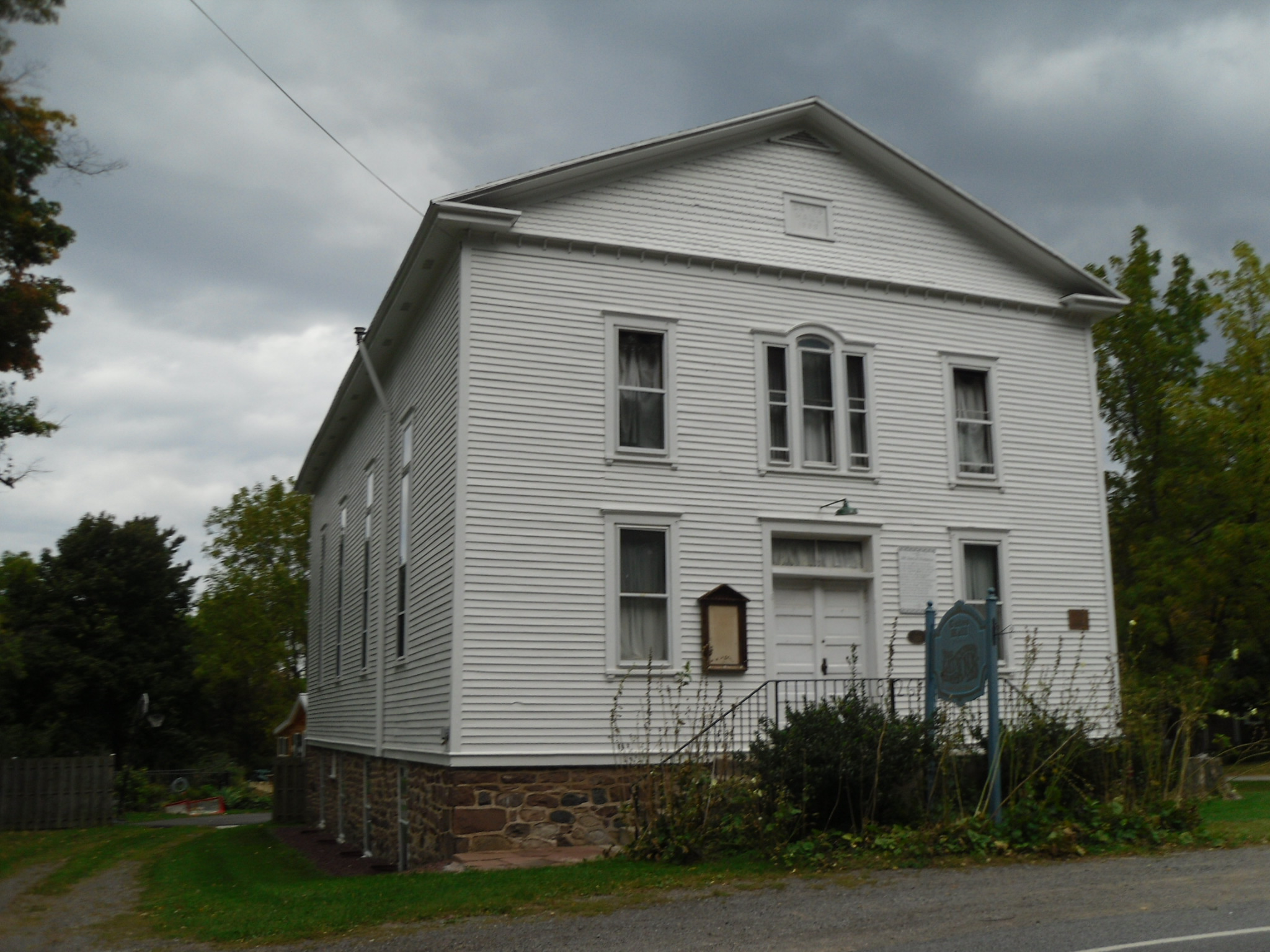
- Gates Hall

- Location within the state of New York
- Coordinates: 43°16′47″N 77°11′10″W
- Country: United States
- State: New York
- County: Wayne
- Town: Williamson
- Established: 1806

Area
  - Total: 2.34 sq mi (6.07 km^{2})
  - Land: 2.34 sq mi (6.07 km^{2})
  - Water: 0 sq mi (0.00 km^{2})
- Elevation: 272 ft (83 m)

Population (2020)
  - Total: 817
  - Density: 348.5/sq mi (134.55/km^{2})
- Time zone: UTC-5 (EDT)
  - Summer (DST): UTC-4 (EDT)
- ZIP Code: 14538
- Area codes: 315 and 680
- FIPS code: 36-59993
- GNIS feature ID: 2631637

Pultneyville is a hamlet (and census-designated place) located in the Town of Williamson, Wayne County, New York, United States. As of the 2020 census, Pultneyville had a population of 817.

Pultneyville frames the mouth of Salmon Creek on the northern border of the town, and is situated on the southern shore of Lake Ontario. The hamlet was originally laid out in 1806, and it has been listed on the National Register of Historic Places. Once a significant Great Lakes trading port and the site of a War of 1812 skirmish, it now is a quiet, Western New York bedroom community.

Nestled between fruit orchards and a Great Lake on the Seaway Trail, many of Pultneyville's activities focus on summer sailing and theatre. The hamlet boasts an active marina, and is home to the second-oldest little theater in the United States.

== History ==
During the latter part of the 17th century, French colonists traded with the Indians at the mouth of Salmon Creek, but no permanent settlement was established until circa 1800. The area is also the landing point for a French military force of 1,600 soldiers from Canada in 1687. At the time, the governor of Canada, Marquis de Denonville, was determined to destroy the Iroquois and this military expedition defeated the Senecas near present-day Victor, New York, about 25 miles south of the landing site.

Pultneyville is named for Sir William Pulteney, 5th Baronet, a Scottish politician and land speculator. Pulteney and his partners purchased 1,000,000 acres (400,000 ha) of the former Phelps and Gorham Purchase in 1790. There is some ambiguity as to when settlement first occurred: some sources refer to Dan Russell as being the first white inhabitant of the area in 1794, others cite "Yankee" Bill Waters in 1804. Waters' cabin was located on the peninsula just north of the harbor inlet. In 1806 Jacob W. Hallet, a land agent for Pulteney, acquired 1,000 acres (400 ha) of the "Pulteney Estate". In 1806 the first post office was established with Hallet as its postmaster. Most of the early settlers were of English or Scottish descent. In subsequent years Dutch Americans immigrated to this area.

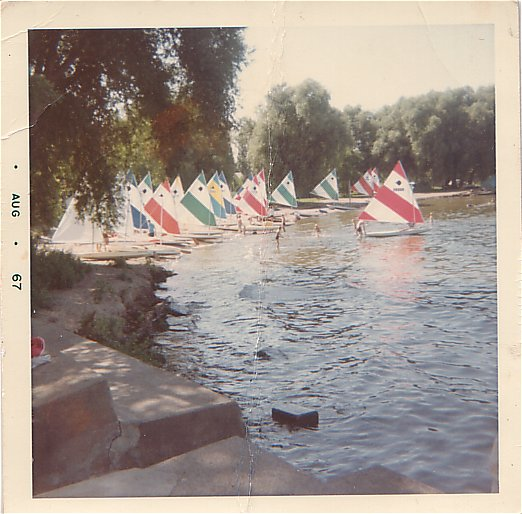
Pultneyville's Crescent Beach in 1967

On May 15, 1814, British forces under the command of Sir James Lucas Yeo landed in the hamlet. Yeo's squadron had already successfully raided Oswego to the east and unsuccessfully attacked Rochester to the west before attempting to obtain stores from Pultneyville. After negotiations between Yeo and American Brigadier-General John Swift, an agreement was reached permitting the British to take public stores without resistance provided private stores were respected. However, Swift's troops opened fired on the British. In the ensuing firefight, two Americans were killed and three wounded, and two more were taken prisoner by the British as they withdrew back to their ships. Yeo's squadron fired back at the Americans before sailing away. Yeo's official report to his superiors stated:

At Pultneyville, 12 miles west of Big Sodus, U.S. Brig. Gen. John Swift signed an agreement to give up Publick stores provided private stores were respected, which they were, but Our Flag of Truce was fired on from the woods as we were loading the last of the small amount of flour we had found there.

A Canandaigua newspaper reported a different version of the events about two weeks later, claiming that Yeo's men landed and proceeded to a warehouse before negotiations were complete. "General Swift, whose force was too inferior to justify an open attack (and which if attempted must have exposed his men to the guns of the whole fleet) commenced a fire upon them from an adjacent wood, which wounded several and became so harassing as to induce them to re-embark, when they commenced a cannonade from the fleet upon the town, which was continued for some time but with no other injury than a few shot-holes through the houses." The two American prisoners were taken to Halifax, Nova Scotia, but were released two months later.

During the early years of the 19th century, activity in Pultneyville focused on agricultural commerce from the surrounding region (as far south as Canandaigua) and the maritime trade on the Great Lakes. Pultneyville was Wayne County's only port until the opening of the Erie Canal in 1823. From about 1811 through the 1890s (when the customs office closed), shipping in this small hamlet extended to the Atlantic Ocean and the world via the Saint Lawrence River, including eastern seaboard cities such as New York City, Boston and Baltimore. In 1865, it was home to nearly 30 Great Lakes captains, and many sailors from Pultneyville crewed on whalers around the world. In 1874 the first railroad appeared when the Lake Ontario Shore Railroad line opened and the center of trade moved three miles south to Williamson. Pultneyville's significance as a commerce center sharply declined, and the customs house was closed in 1892.

== Landmarks and events ==
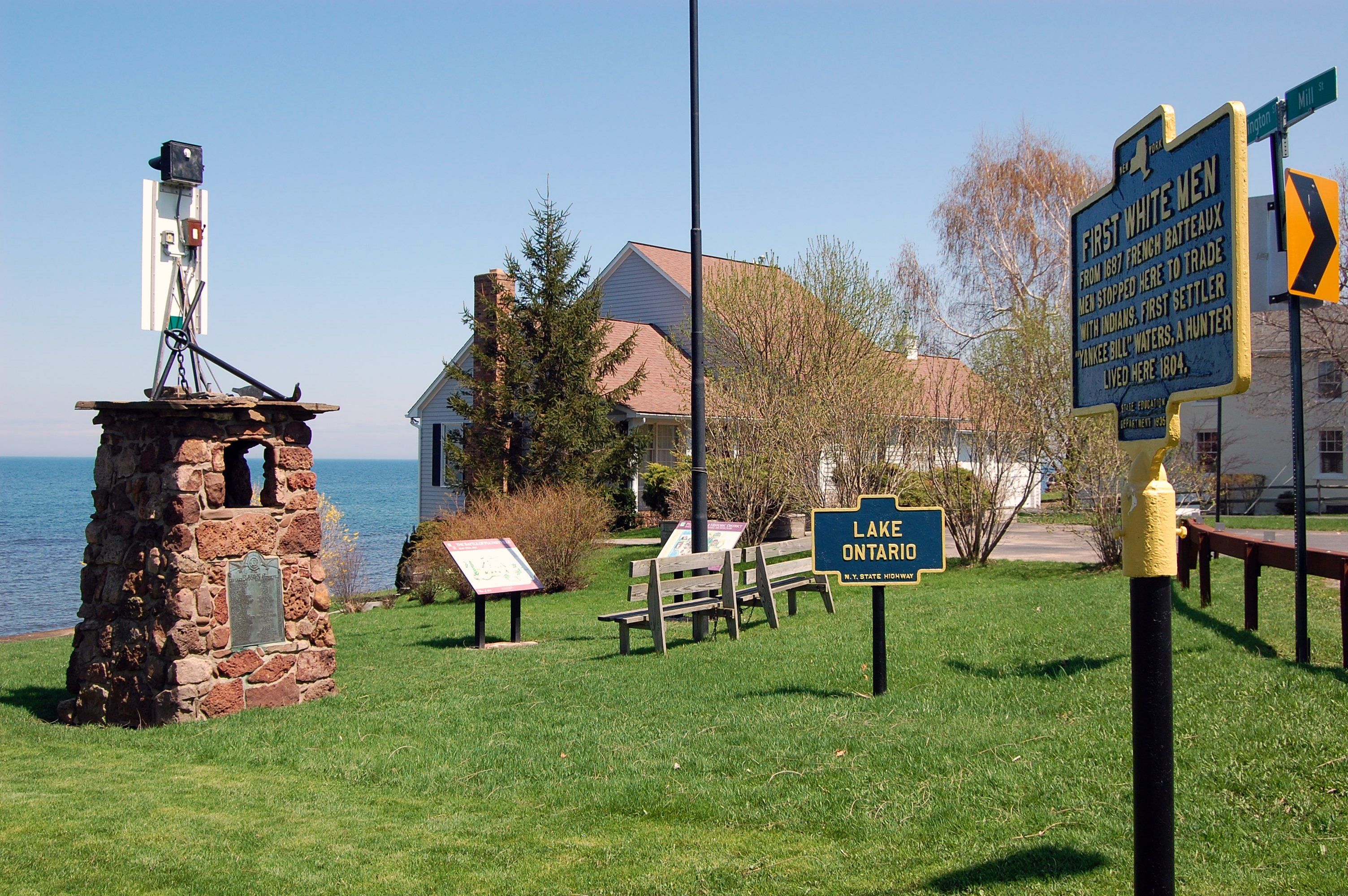
Pultneyville's Lake Captains' Monument and lakefront

In 1985 parts of the hamlet were designated an historic district and listed with the National Register of Historic Places as the Pultneyville Historic District. The honor recognizes the community's architectural significance, particularly in the areas of Federal, Second Empire, and Greek Revival styles. Additionally, Gates Hall, a structure built in 1825 as a multi-denominational church, is still in use as a performance theater and meeting hall. It, too, is listed with the National Register of Historic Places (2000) in recognition of its contributions in the areas of architecture (Queen Anne and Greek Revival), social history, and performing arts. During the second quarter of the nineteenth century lectures on the evils of alcohol and slavery, the merits of women's suffrage, phrenology and spiritualism were held in the church. During the Civil War the church was used for packing barrels of supplies for Union Army soldiers. In 1867, the Pultneyville Lyceum began performing improvised stage productions with gasoline lamps serving as spotlights. Contemporary community theater organizations have continuously staged productions in the building since 1961. As a result, the Library of Congress found Gates Hall to be the second-oldest little theater in the United States.

== Geography ==
Pultneyville is located at 43°16′47″N 77°11′10″W (43.273724, -77.172363).

According to the United States Census Bureau, the CDP has a total area of 2.2 square miles (5.7 km^{2}), all land.

== Demographics ==
Historical population
Census	Pop.	Note	%±
2020	817		—
U.S. Decennial Census

As of the census of 2010, there were 698 people, 293 households, and 229 families residing in the CDP. The population density was 317.3 inhabitants per square mile (122.5/km^{2}). The racial makeup of the CDP was 96.6% White, 1.0% Black or African American, 0.6% Native American, 0.1% Asian, 0.0% Pacific Islander, 0.0% from other races, and 1.7% from two or more races. Hispanic or Latino of any race were 0.9% of the population.

There were 293 households, out of which 21.8% had children under the age of 18 living with them, 67.6% were married couples living together, 7.5% had a female householder with no husband present, and 21.8% were non-families. 18.8% of all households were made up of individuals, and 7.8% had someone living alone who was 65 years of age or older. The average household size was 2.38 and the average family size was 2.69.

In the CDP, the population was spread out, with 20.0% under the age of 20, 2.9% from 20 to 24, 21.6% from 25 to 44, 33.3% from 45 to 64, and 22.3% who were 65 years of age or older. The median age was 48.3 years. For every 100 females, there were 94.4 males. For every 100 females age 18 and over, there were 88.7 males.

The median income for a household in the CDP was $90,625, and the median income for a family was $105,139. Males had a median income of $75,096 versus $52,578 for females. The per capita income for the CDP was $43,095. No one was shown under the poverty line.

=== Housing ===
There were 336 housing units at an average density of 152.7 per square mile (59.0/km^{2}). 12.8% of housing units were vacant.

There were 293 occupied housing units in the CDP. 271 were owner-occupied units (92.5%), while 22 were renter-occupied (7.5%). The homeowner vacancy rate was 1.1% of total units. The rental unit vacancy rate was 4.3%.

NOTE: It is common for resort communities to have higher than normal vacant house counts. Many are vacation homes which are seasonal and not regularly occupied.
