= United States Post Office (Lyons, New York) =

- US Post Office-Lyons
- U.S. National Register of Historic Places
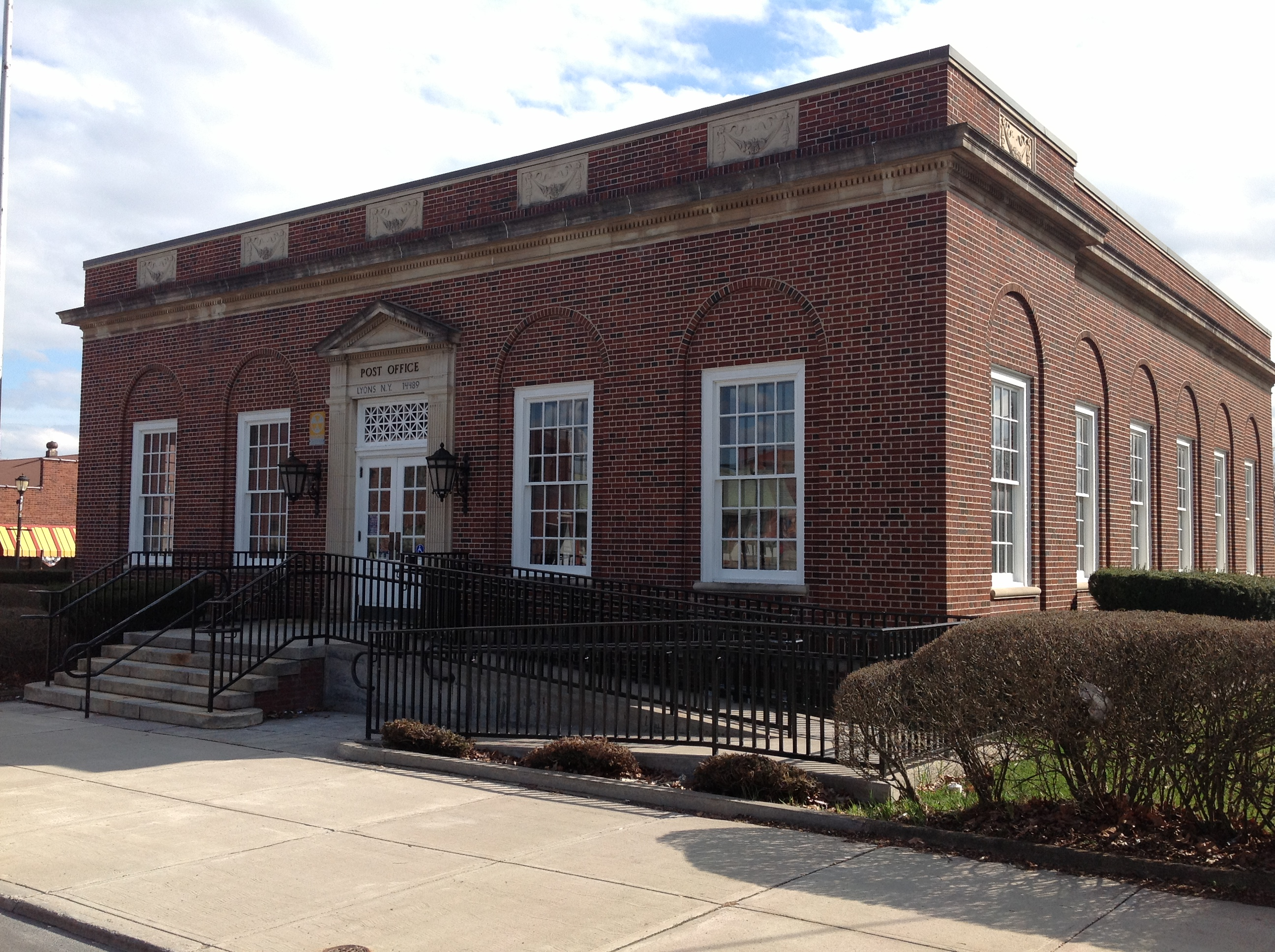
- United States Post Office, April 2013

- Location within New York Location within the United States
- Location: 1-5 Pearl St., Lyons, New York
- Coordinates: 43°3′46″N 76°59′37″W
- Area: less than one acre
- Built: 1931
- Architect: Wetmore, James A.; US Treasury Department
- Architectural style: Colonial Revival
- MPS: US Post Offices in New York State, 1858–1943, TR
- NRHP reference No.: 88002349
- Added to NRHP: May 11, 1989

US Post Office-Lyons is a historic post office building located at Lyons in Wayne County, New York. It was designed and built in 1931–1932 and is one of a number of post offices in New York State designed by the Office of the Supervising Architect of the Treasury Department, James A. Wetmore. It is a 1-story, five-by-six-bay, brick building with a pedimented entrance in the Colonial Revival style.

It was listed on the National Register of Historic Places in 1989.
