= Gates Hall and Pultneyville Public Square =

- U.S. National Register of Historic Places
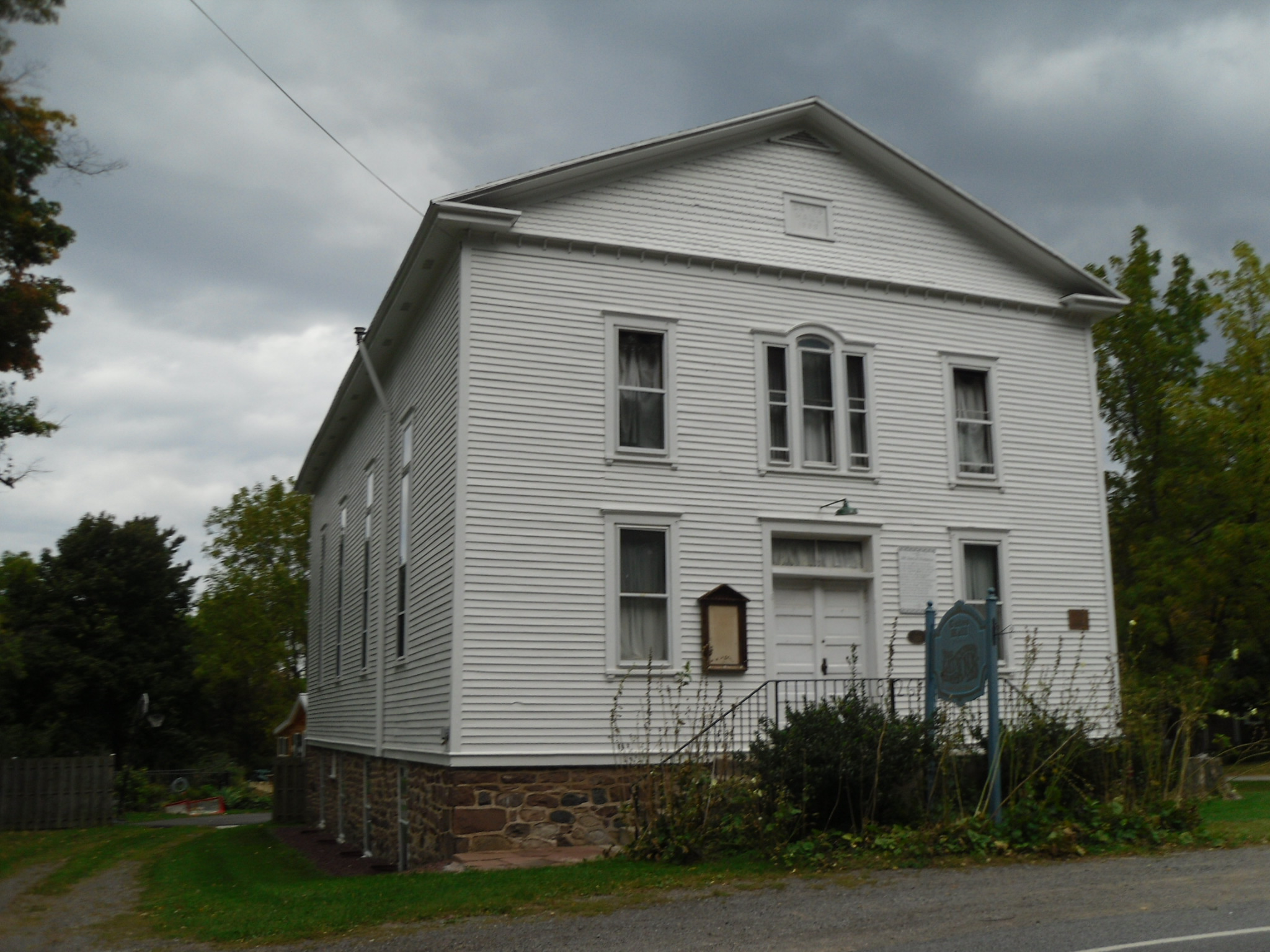
- Gates Hall, September 2010

- Location within New York Location within the United States
- Location: Lake Rd., Pultneyville, New York
- Coordinates: 43°16′48″N 77°11′13″W
- Area: 2 acres (0.81 ha)
- Built: 1826
- Architect: Andrew Cornwall, Ansel Cornwall
- Architectural style: Greek Revival, Queen Anne
- NRHP reference No.: 00000177
- Added to NRHP: March 3, 2000

Gates Hall and Pultneyville Public Square is a historic theater and village green located at Pultneyville in Wayne County, New York.

== History ==
Gates Hall was built in 1826 by the Union Church Society as a place of worship for the community's Methodists, Presbyterians, and Episcopalians.

In 1867, the building began to be used as a summer season community theater. Theater performances have taken place every calendar year since 1867, making Gates Hall both the oldest and the longest running community theater in the United States.

It was remodeled in 1894 in the Queen Anne style to serve as a multipurpose civic building. It is a two-story, gable roofed building resting on a raised basement. Pultneyville Public Square is a village green, approximately one acre in extent, that serves the passive recreational needs of the hamlet.

It was listed on the National Register of Historic Places in 2000.
