= Pultneyville Historic District =

Historic district in New York, United States

- U.S. National Register of Historic Places
- U.S. Historic district
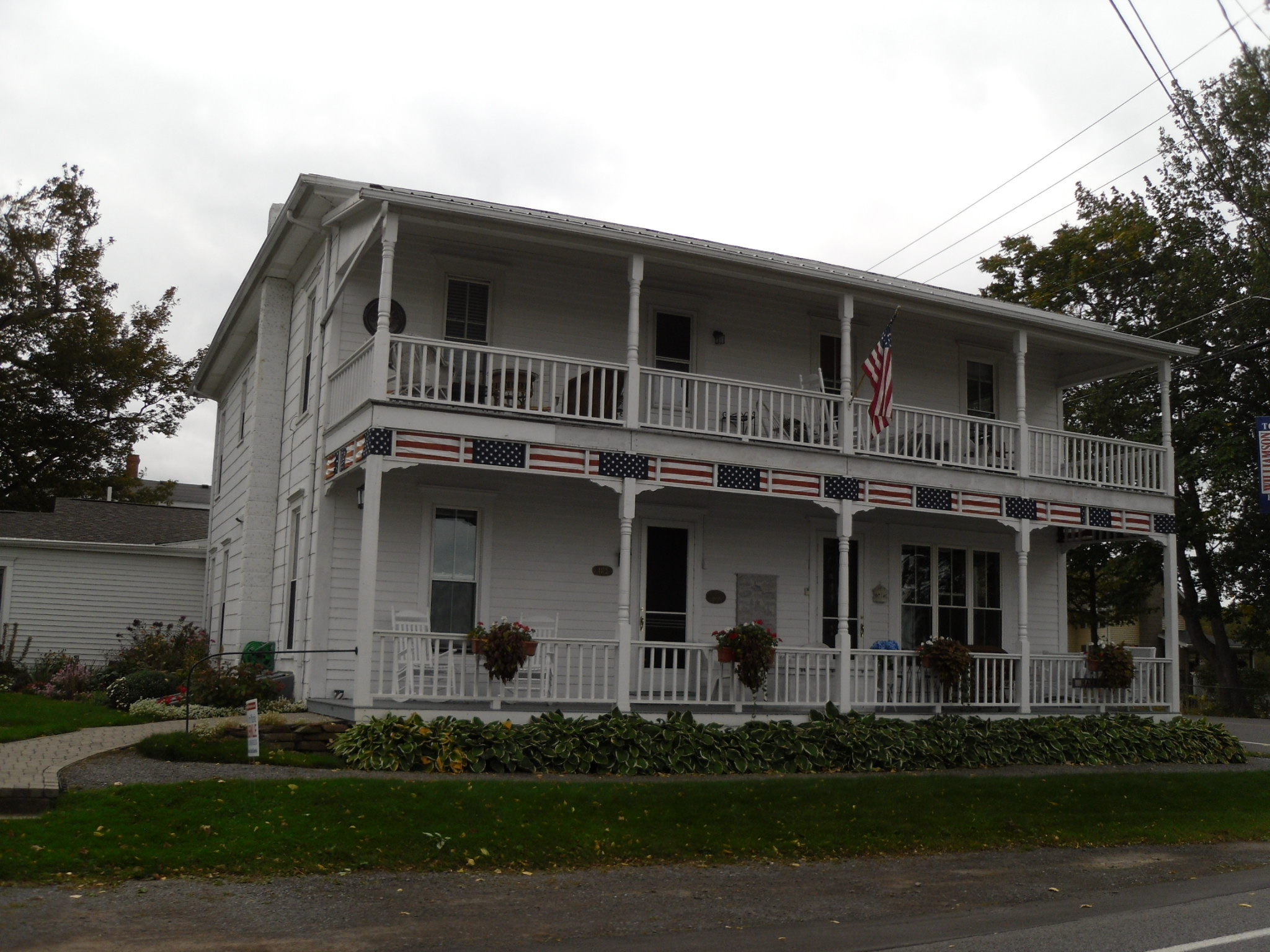
- House on Lake Road, September 2010

- Location within New York Location within the United States
- Location: Sections of Lake Rd. and Jay St., Pultneyville, New York
- Coordinates: 43°16′48″N 77°10′54″W
- Area: 37 acres (15 ha)
- Built: 1810
- Architectural style: Greek Revival, Second Empire, Federal
- NRHP reference No.: 85002325
- Added to NRHP: September 11, 1985

Pultneyville Historic District is a national historic district located at Pultneyville in Wayne County, New York. The district includes 35 properties containing 33 contributing primary structures and 18 contributing outbuildings. It encompasses the historic core of Pultneyville. Its earliest buildings are well crafted, modest to relatively sophisticated Federal and Greek Revival style dwellings built between about 1810 and 1850.

It was listed on the National Register of Historic Places in 1985.
