= H. G. Hotchkiss Essential Oil Company Plant =

- U.S. National Register of Historic Places
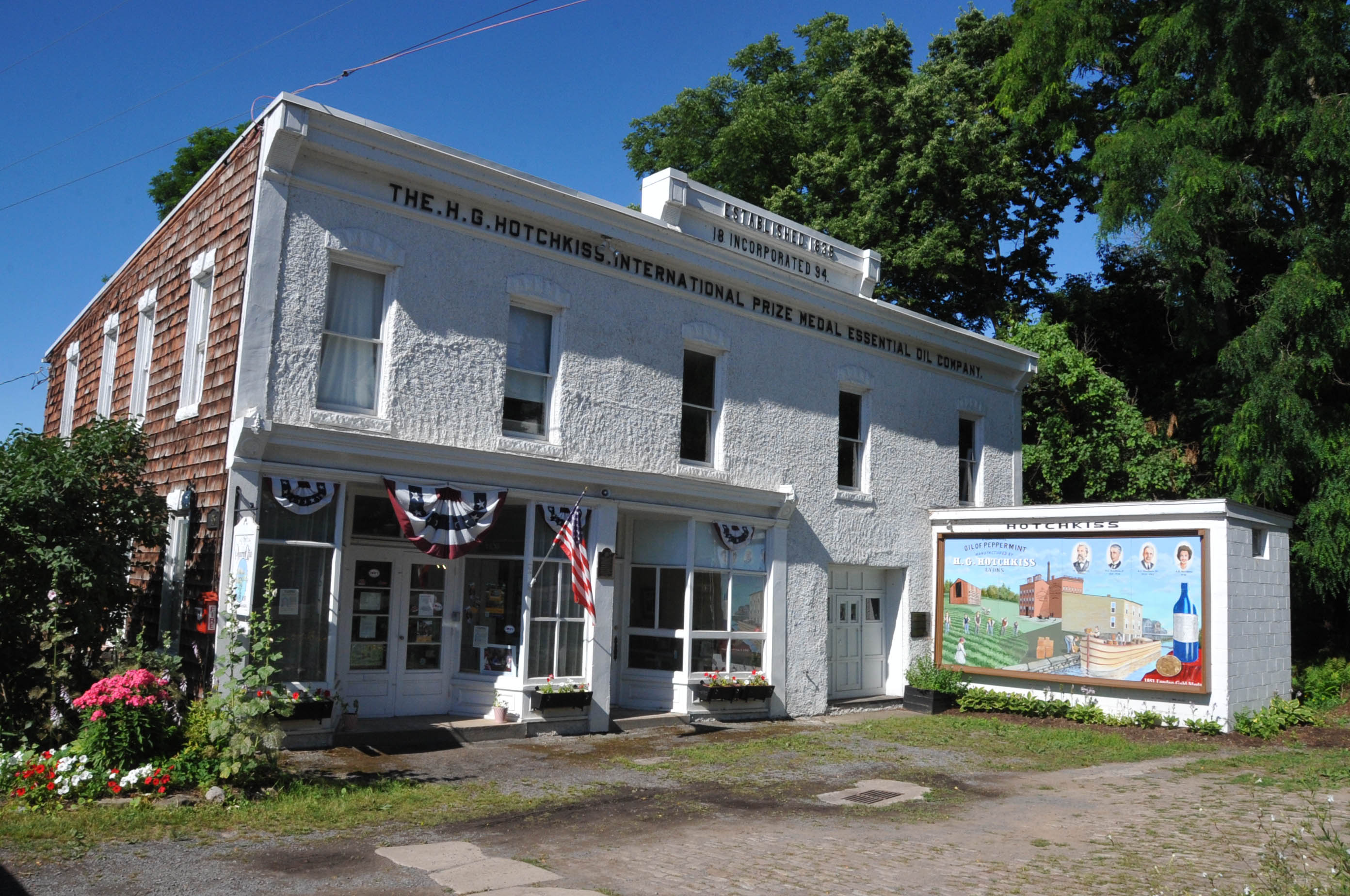

- Location within New York Location within the United States
- Location: 93-95 Water St., Lyons, New York
- Coordinates: 43°3′46″N 76°59′48″W
- Area: less than one acre
- Built: 1884
- NRHP reference No.: 87001897
- Added to NRHP: November 02, 1987

H. G. Hotchkiss Essential Oil Company Plant is a historic factory located at Lyons in Wayne County, New York. The remaining two story commercial building is an example of a small frame structure featuring a double storefront with modest ornamentation. It was built about 1884 on the foundations of an earlier structure and is located on the bank of the original Erie Canal. It was occupied by a major producer of essential oils, principally peppermint oil used in the manufacture of patent medicine.

It was listed on the National Register of Historic Places in 1987.
