= Towar–Ennis Farmhouse and Barn Complex =

- U.S. National Register of Historic Places
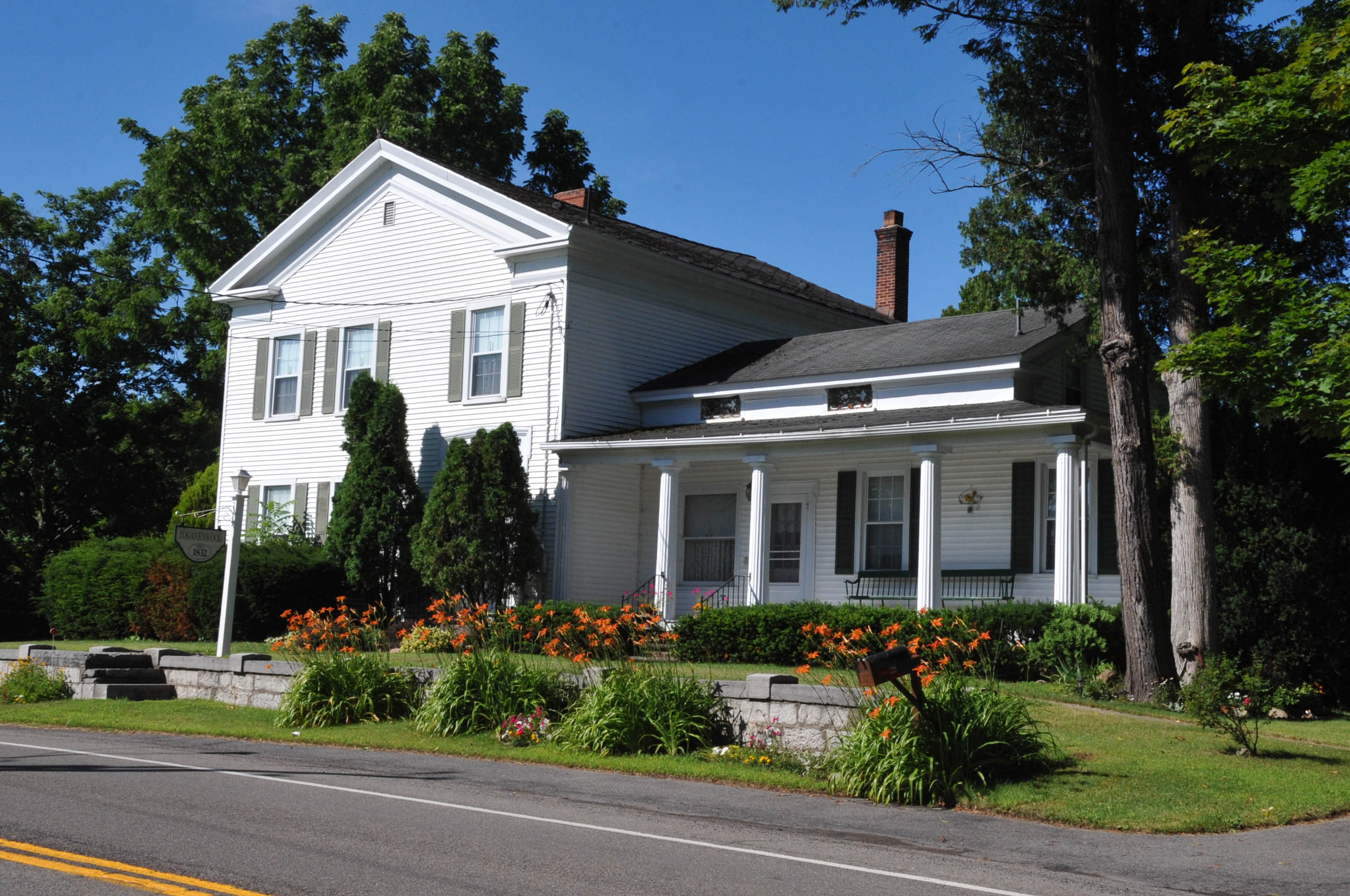
- the farmhouse

- Location within New York Location within the United States
- Location: 265 NY 14, Lyons, New York
- Coordinates: 43°1′11.72″N 76°59′12.13″W
- Area: 4 acres (1.6 ha)
- Built: 1832, 1852
- Architectural style: Greek Revival
- NRHP reference No.: 09000967
- Added to NRHP: October 16, 2009

Towar–Ennis Farmhouse and Barn Complex is a historic farm complex located at Lyons in Wayne County, New York. The contributing elements of the complex include a vernacular Greek Revival style farmhouse, two barns (one with silo), a carriage house, a corncrib, a smoke house, a stone retaining wall, and a hitching post. The farmhouse consists of a two-story, three-bay wide, sidehall plan main block built in 1832, with a 1 1/2 story side wing added in 1852. A rear kitchen wing was added in 1986. The main barn was built in 1852. The complex is representative of rural agrarian farmsteads of the 19th and early-20th centuries in the Finger Lakes Region.

It was listed on the National Register of Historic Places in 2009.
