= Marion, New York =

- Town
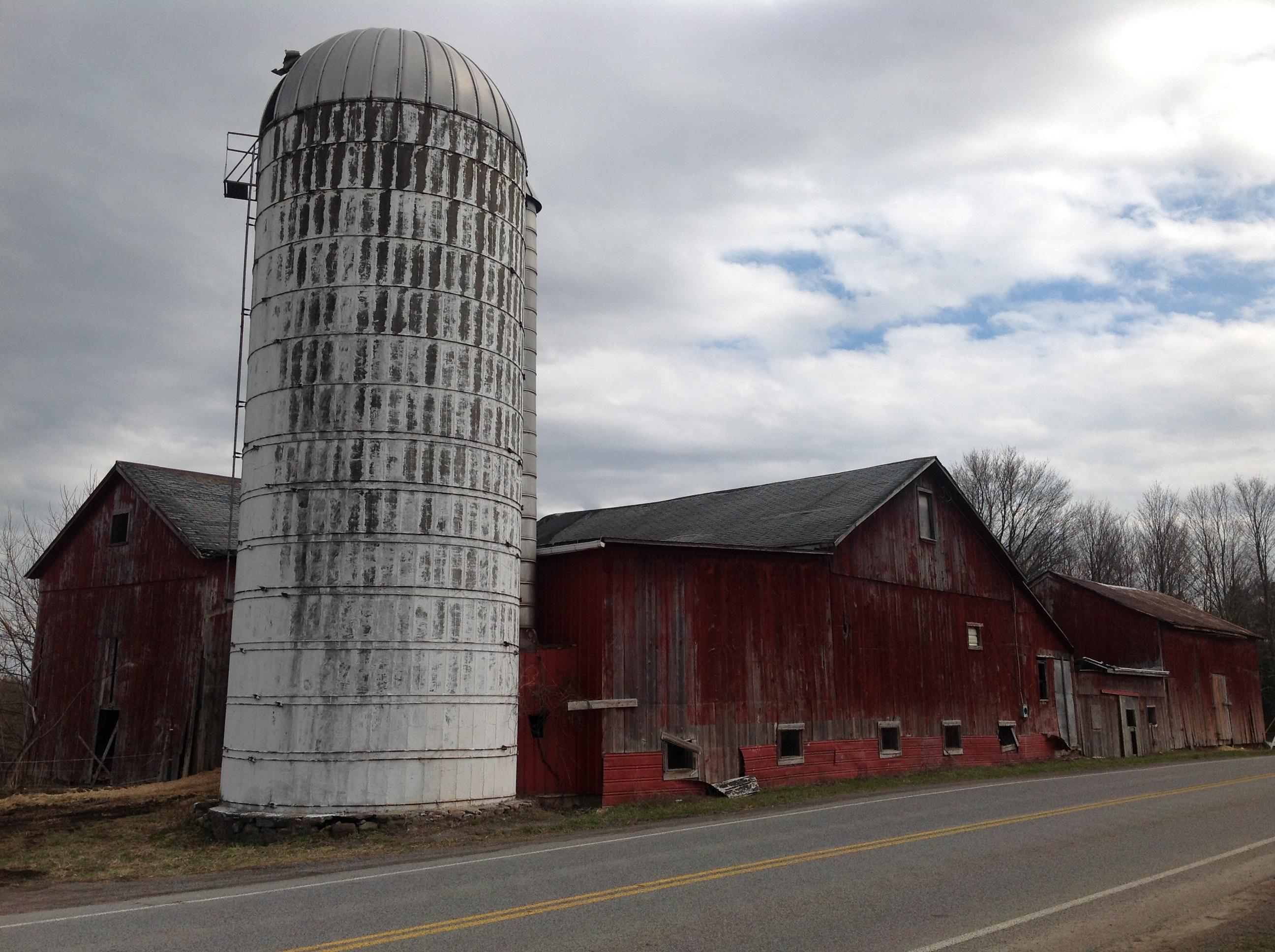
- The Ezra T. Phelps Farm Complex is a good example of Marion's long history with agriculture.

- Location in Wayne County and the state of New York.

- Location within the state of New York
- Coordinates: 43°9′17″N 77°11′6″W
- Country: United States
- State: New York
- County: Wayne
- Settled: 1795
- Established: April 18, 1825

Government
  - Type: Town Board
  - Supervisor: Jolene Bender
  - Clerk: Heidi Levan
  - Court: Justice Paul Bender; Justice Samuel J. Bonafede

Area
  - Total: 29.25 sq mi (75.76 km^{2})
  - Land: 29.15 sq mi (75.49 km^{2})
  - Water: 0.10 sq mi (0.27 km^{2})
- Elevation: 469 ft (143 m)

Population (2010)
  - Total: 4,746
  - Estimate (2016): 4,603
  - Density: 157.9/sq mi (60.98/km^{2})
- Time zone: UTC-5 (Eastern (EST))
  - Summer (DST): UTC-4 (EDT)
- ZIP code: 14505
- Area codes: 315 and 680
- FIPS code: 36-45645
- GNIS feature ID: 0979199
- Website: www.townofmarionny.com

Marion is a town in Wayne County, New York, United States. The population was 4,746 as of the 2010 census. It is named after Revolutionary War hero Francis Marion. It is an interior town near the center of the county, approximately 20 miles east of Rochester, New York and 50 miles west of Syracuse.

The town has a hamlet (and census-designated place), also called Marion. Government offices for the town are located there.

== History ==
Marion was part of the Phelps and Gorham Purchase. The area was first settled around 1795.

The Town of Marion was created from the Town of Williamson on April 18, 1825, as the "Town of Winchester." It was renamed in 1826 for Francis Marion, a brigadier general from South Carolina in the American Revolutionary War.

The Ezra T. Phelps Farm Complex was listed on the National Register of Historic Places in 2009.

== Geography ==
According to the United States Census Bureau, the town has a total area of 29.3 square miles (76 km^{2}), of which 29.2 square miles (76 km^{2}) is land and 0.1 square miles (0.26 km^{2}) (0.24%) is water. Marion is located in the 315/680 area code.

New York State Route 21 is a primary north-south highway in the town.

== Demographics ==
Historical population
| Census | Pop. | Note | %± |
|---|---|---|---|
| 1830 | 1,981 | | — |
| 1840 | 1,903 | | −3.9% |
| 1850 | 1,839 | | −3.4% |
| 1860 | 2,033 | | 10.5% |
| 1870 | 1,967 | | −3.2% |
| 1880 | 2,100 | | 6.8% |
| 1890 | 2,144 | | 2.1% |
| 1900 | 2,015 | | −6.0% |
| 1910 | 2,102 | | 4.3% |
| 1920 | 2,158 | | 2.7% |
| 1930 | 2,172 | | 0.6% |
| 1940 | 2,240 | | 3.1% |
| 1950 | 2,412 | | 7.7% |
| 1960 | 2,785 | | 15.5% |
| 1970 | 3,784 | | 35.9% |
| 1980 | 4,456 | | 17.8% |
| 1990 | 4,901 | | 10.0% |
| 2000 | 4,974 | | 1.5% |
| 2010 | 4,746 | | −4.6% |
| 2016 (est.) | 4,603 | ▼ | −3.0% |
U.S. Decennial Census

As of the census of 2010, there were 4,746 people, 1,814 households, and 1,333 families residing in the town. The population density was 162.0 inhabitants per square mile (62.5/km^{2}). The racial makeup of the town was 96.7% White, 0.8% Black or African American, 0.2% Native American, 0.2% Asian, 0.0% Pacific Islander, 0.8% from other races, and 1.2% from two or more races. Hispanic or Latino of any race were 2.6% of the population.

There were 1,814 households, out of which 31.0% had children under the age of 18 living with them, 58.3% were married couples living together, 10.4% had a female householder with no husband present, and 26.5% were non-families. 20.0% of all households were made up of individuals, and 8.1% had someone living alone who was 65 years of age or older. The average household size was 2.61 and the average family size was 2.99.

In the town, the population was spread out, with 26.8% under the age of 20, 5.0% from 20 to 24, 24.6% from 25 to 44, 30.8% from 45 to 64, and 12.6% who were 65 years of age or older. The median age was 41.1 years. For every 100 females, there were 95.1 males. For every 100 females age 18 and over, there were 95.1 males.

The median income for a household in the town was $59,440, and the median income for a family was $70,581. Males had a median income of $55,461 versus $41,513 for females. The per capita income for the town was $27,081. About 8.2% of families and 9.3% of the population were below the poverty line, including 13.6% of those under age 18 and 10.2% of those age 65 or over.

=== Housing ===
There were 1,908 housing units at an average density of 65.1 per square mile (25.1/km^{2}); a total of 4.9% of housing units were vacant.

There were 1,814 occupied housing units in the town, of which 1,520 were owner-occupied units (83.8%), while 294 were renter-occupied (16.2%). The homeowner vacancy rate was 0.8% of total units. The rental unit vacancy rate was 7.8%.

== Communities and locations in the Town of Marion ==
- Lower Corners – A historical location in the town.
- Marion – The hamlet and CDP of Marion is near the center of the town at the junction of County Roads 207 and 216.
- Owls Nest – A hamlet at the east town line on County Road 215.
- Red Creek – A stream flowing through the town.
- Upper Corners – A historical location in the town.

== Notable people ==
- William M. Runyan, Christian songwriter who composed Great Is Thy Faithfulness
- William Robert Brooks, astronomer
