= Lyons, New York =

- Town
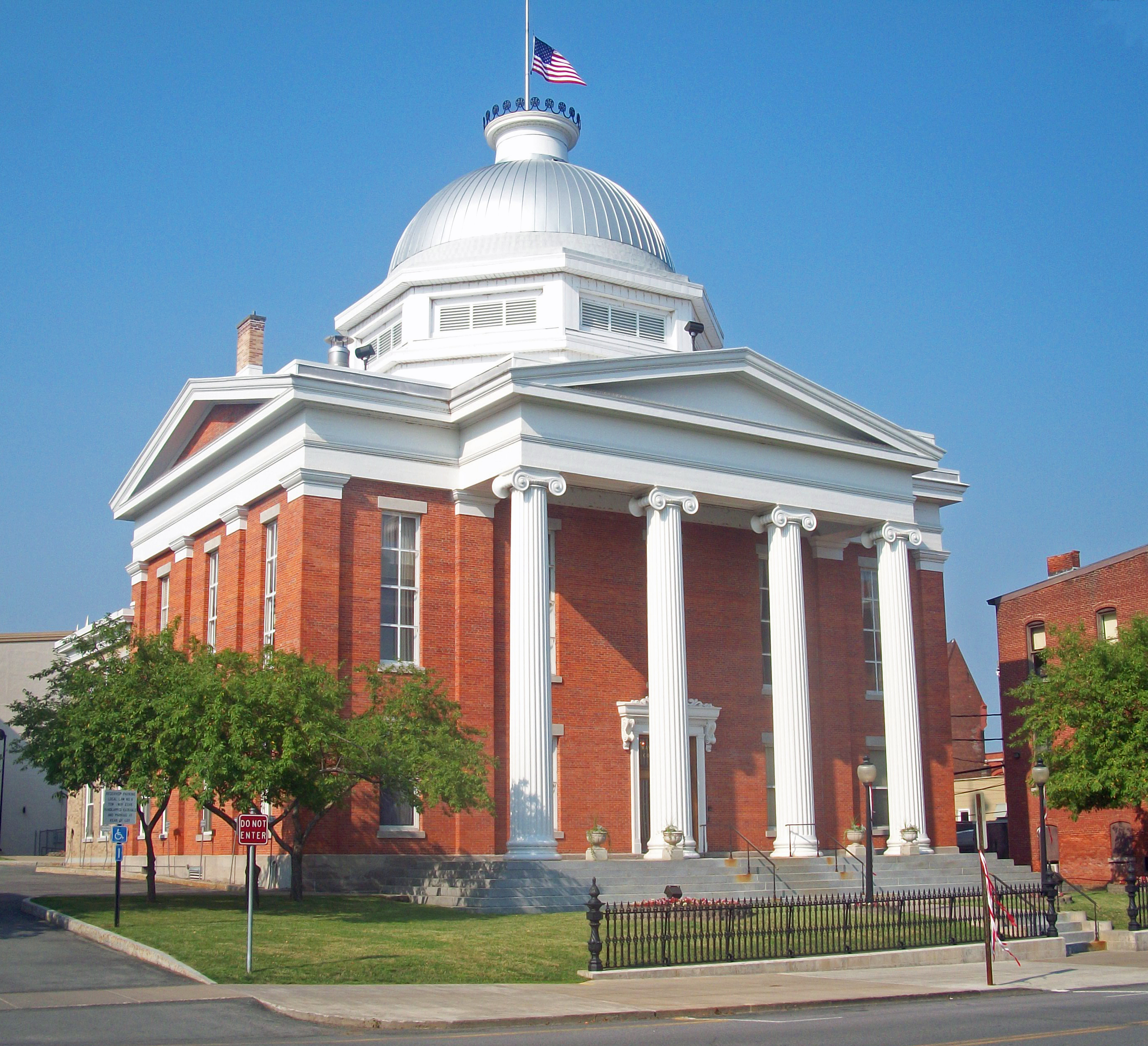
- Wayne County Courthouse
- Nickname: "Peppermint City"
- Location in Wayne County and the state of New York.
- Coordinates: 43°03′35″N 076°59′33″W
- Country: United States
- State: New York
- County: Wayne
- Settled: 1789
- Established: March 1, 1811

Government
  - Type: Town Board
  - Supervisor: Jim Brady
  - Clerk: Sal J. Colatarci
  - Court: Justice Richard Youngman; Justice Phil DeSain

Area
  - Total: 4.69 sq mi (12.15 km^{2})
  - Land: 4.61 sq mi (11.95 km^{2})
  - Water: 0.077 sq mi (0.20 km^{2})
- Elevation: 449 ft (137 m)

Population (2020)
  - Total: 3,989
  - Density: 864.7/sq mi (333.88/km^{2})
- Time zone: UTC−5 (Eastern (EST))
  - Summer (DST): UTC−4 (EDT)
- ZIP Code: 14489
- Area codes: 315 and 680
- FIPS code: 36-43962
- GNIS feature ID: 0956197
- Website: https://www.lyonsny.gov/

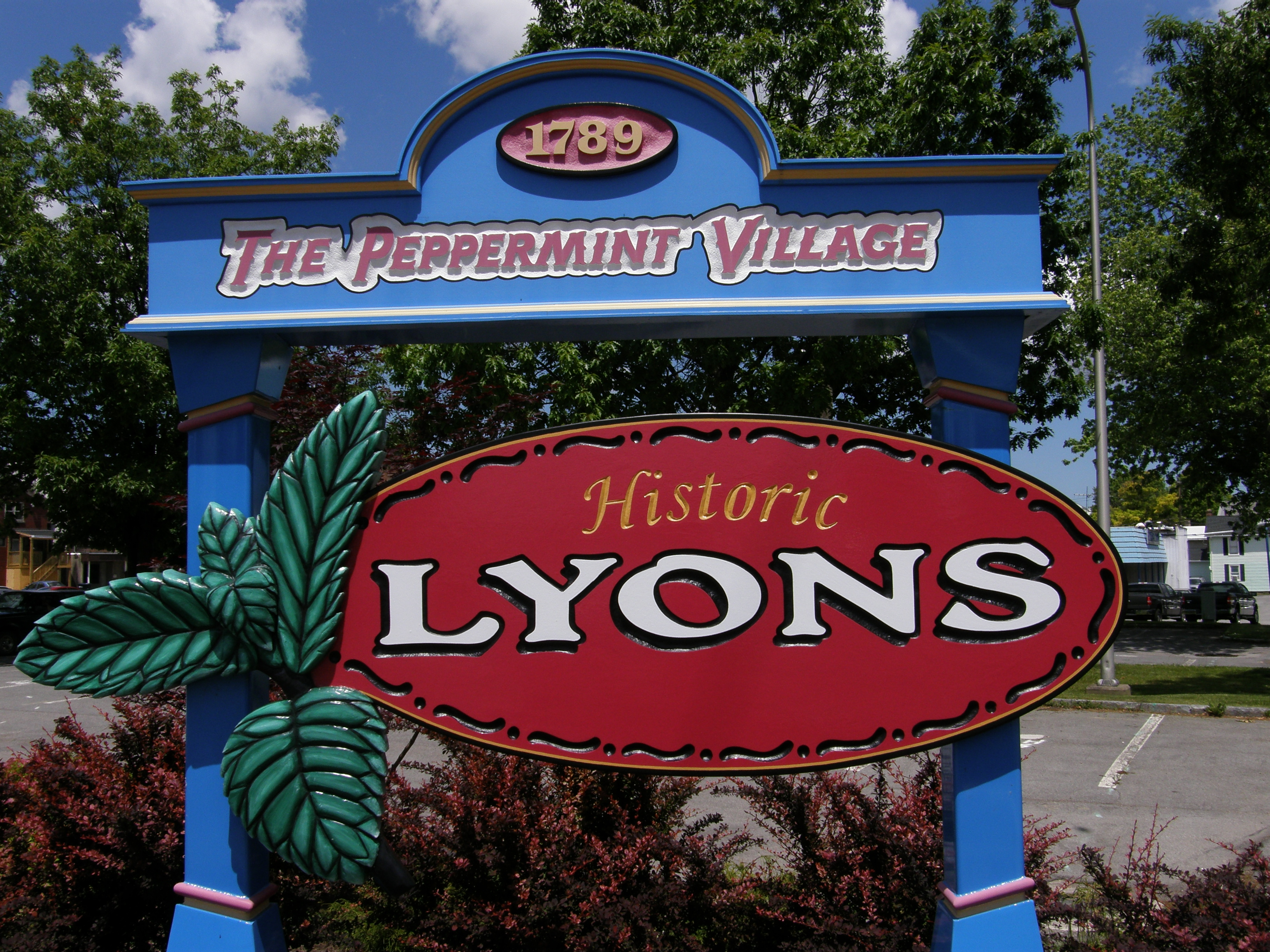
Village welcome sign

Lyons is a town in and the county seat of Wayne County, New York, United States. The population was 5,682 at the 2010 census. It is named after Lyon, France.

The Town of Lyons is in the south-central part of the county and contains a hamlet also named Lyons, formerly a village. It is located on the Erie Canal.

== History ==
The area was part of the Pulteney Estate. Settlement began circa 1789. The region was originally known as "The Forks." The Town of Lyons was formed from the Town of Sodus in 1811. The Erie Canal was completed as far as Lyons by 1821.

In 1825, the size of the town was reduced upon the formation of the Town of Arcadia.

== Geography ==
According to the United States Census Bureau, the town has a total area of 37.6 square miles (97.4 km^{2}), of which 37.5 square miles (97.1 km^{2}) is land and 0.1 square mile (0.3 km^{2}) (0.32%) is water.

New York State Route 14 and New York State Route 31 intersect in the hamlet of Lyons.

== Demographics ==
Historical population
Census	Pop.	Note	%±
1820	3,972		—
1830	3,603		−9.3%
1840	4,302		19.4%
1850	4,925		14.5%
1860	5,076		3.1%
1870	5,115		0.8%
1880	5,762		12.6%
1890	6,228		8.1%
1900	5,824		−6.5%
1910	5,913		1.5%
1920	5,559		−6.0%
1930	5,073		−8.7%
1940	5,076		0.1%
1950	5,379		6.0%
1960	6,147		14.3%
1970	6,015		−2.1%
1980	6,073		1.0%
1990	6,315		4.0%
2000	5,831		−7.7%
2010	5,682		−2.6%
2020	3,989		−29.8%
U.S. Decennial Census

As of the census of 2010, there were 5,682 people, 2,206 households, and 1,389 families residing in the town. The population density was 151.1 inhabitants per square mile (58.3/km^{2}). The racial makeup of the town was 87.1% White, 8.1% Black or African American, 0.4% Native American, 0.2% Asian, 0.0% Pacific Islander, 1.7% from other races, and 2.5% from two or more races. Hispanic or Latino of any race were 4.7% of the population.

There were 2,206 households, out of which 26.0% had children under the age of 18 living with them, 41.7% were married couples living together, 15.4% had a female householder with no husband present, and 37.0% were non-families. 29.9% of all households were made up of individuals, and 11.8% had someone living alone who was 65 years of age or older. The average household size was 2.41 and the average family size was 2.94.

In the town, the population was spread out, with 24.8% under the age of 20, 6.2% from 20 to 24, 23.5% from 25 to 44, 28.5% from 45 to 64, and 16.9% who were 65 years of age or older. The median age was 41.9 years. For every 100 females, there were 96.0 males. For every 100 females age 18 and over, there were 96.1 males.

The median income for a household in the town was $39,198, and the median income for a family was $53,430. Males had a median income of $40,883 versus $30,914 for females. The per capita income for the town was $21,016. About 14.9% of families and 21.3% of the population were below the poverty line, including 36.2% of those under age 18 and 10.3% of those age 65 or over.

=== Housing ===
There were 2,458 housing units at an average density of 65.4 per square mile (25.3/km^{2}); a total of 10.3% of housing units were vacant.

There were 2,206 occupied housing units in the town, of which 1,443 were owner-occupied units (65.4%), while 763 were renter-occupied (34.6%). The homeowner vacancy rate was 1.8% of total units. The rental unit vacancy rate was 12.0%.

== Economy ==
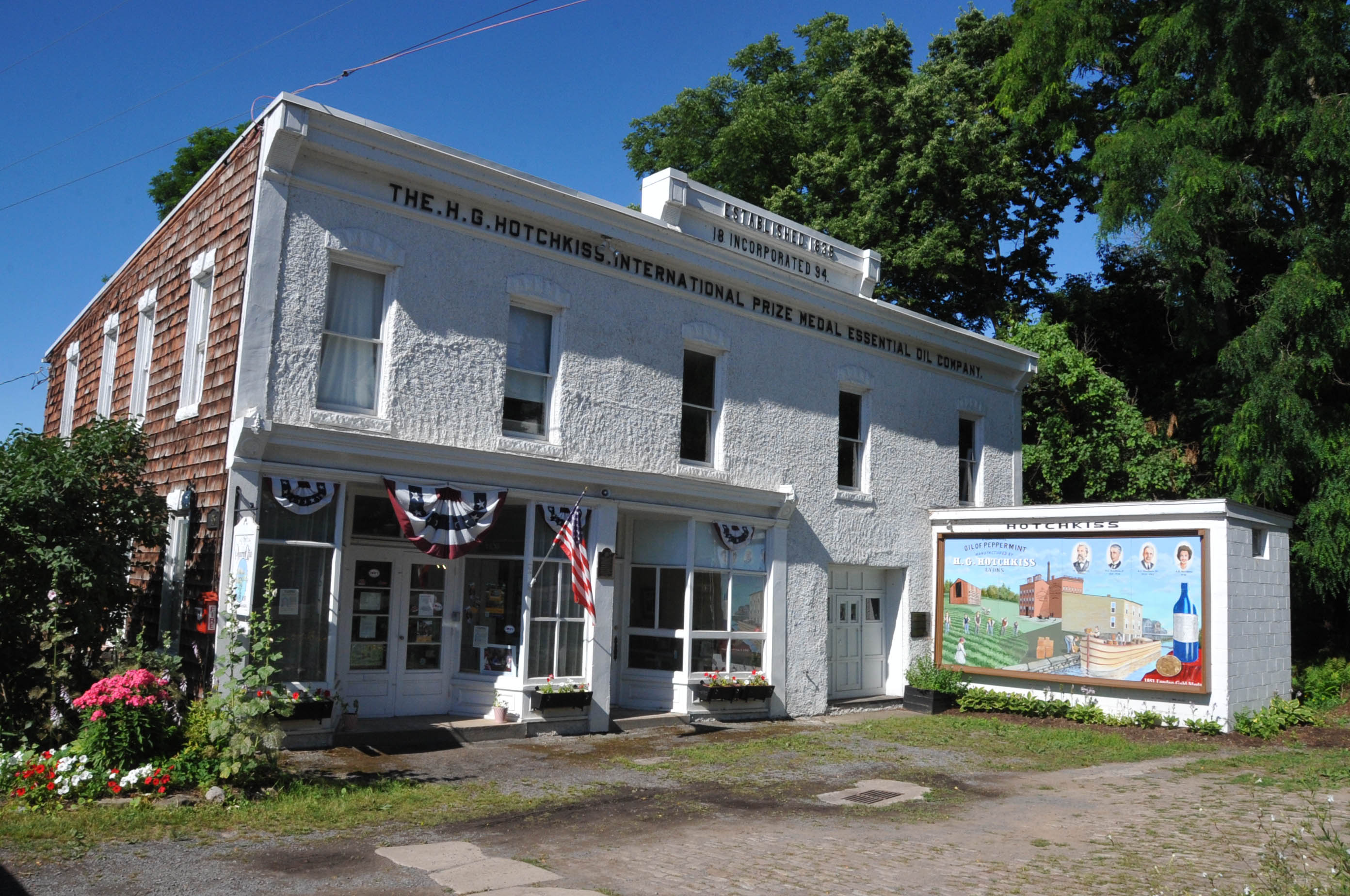
The H. G. Hotchkiss Essential Oil Company plant

H.G. Hotchkiss moved his Hotchkiss Essential Oil Company to Lyons in 1841, where it became an important business in the local economy.

== Arts and culture ==
The Dipper Dredge No. 3 and Towar–Ennis Farmhouse and Barn Complex are listed on the National Register of Historic Places.

Remnants of the former Enlarged Erie Canal Lock 56 (also called the Poorhouse Lock) are located along Dry Dock Road near the current Lock 28A and dry docks complex west of Lyons, just off N.Y. Route 31. It was a double-chamber lock built in 1842, and had a lift of 10.12 feet (3.08 m) to the west. The lock was abandoned around 1911.

Lyons is part of the Erie Canalway National Heritage Corridor. Erie Canal Lock 28A is located just west of the bridge on Dry Dock Road, off N.Y. Route 31. It was built around 1913, and has a lift of 19.5 feet (5.85 m) to the west. The dry docks complex is adjacent to the lock, operated by the New York State Canal Corporation.

As of 2025, advocates are pushing for a park to be built adjacent to the railroad crossing on Leach Road for railfans to enjoy.

== Notable people ==
- Michael Bastian, fashion designer
- Jim Boeheim, Syracuse University basketball coach
- Willard H. Brownson Rear Admiral, Superintendent of the US Naval Academy from 1902-1905
- John H. Camp, former US Congressman
- Ann Collins, equine artist
- William Dorsheimer, Lieutenant Governor of New York and U.S. Congressman
- Birgitta Moran Farmer, miniaturist
- Cordelia A. Greene, physician
- Mel Hall, Major League Baseball player imprisoned for sexual assault against minors
- Bob Hartman, guitarist and founding member of the Christian rock band Petra
- John M. Holley, former US Congressman
- Vashti McCollum, advocate of removal of religious education from public schools, was born in Lyons.
- William Patterson, former US Congressman
- Myron Charles Taylor, U.S. Special Envoy to the Vatican under Presidents Roosevelt and Truman. CEO of United States Steel Corporation.
- Mildred F. Taylor, NYS Assemblywoman.
- Martha Van Marter (1839-1931), editor and writer

== Communities and locations in the Town of Lyons ==
- Alloway — A hamlet in the south part of the town on NY-14.
- Lyons — The hamlet of Lyons at the intersection of NY-31 and NY-14 along the Erie Canal, formerly an incorporated village.
- Pilgrimport — A hamlet by the east town line on County Road 244 at the old route of the Erie Canal.
- Slaterville — A railroad district community located south of NY-31 which is now part of the hamlet of Lyons.
- Zurich — A hamlet at the town line in the northwest part of the town on County Road 237.
