= Lyons (hamlet), New York =

Lyons, New York
- Hamlet and CDP
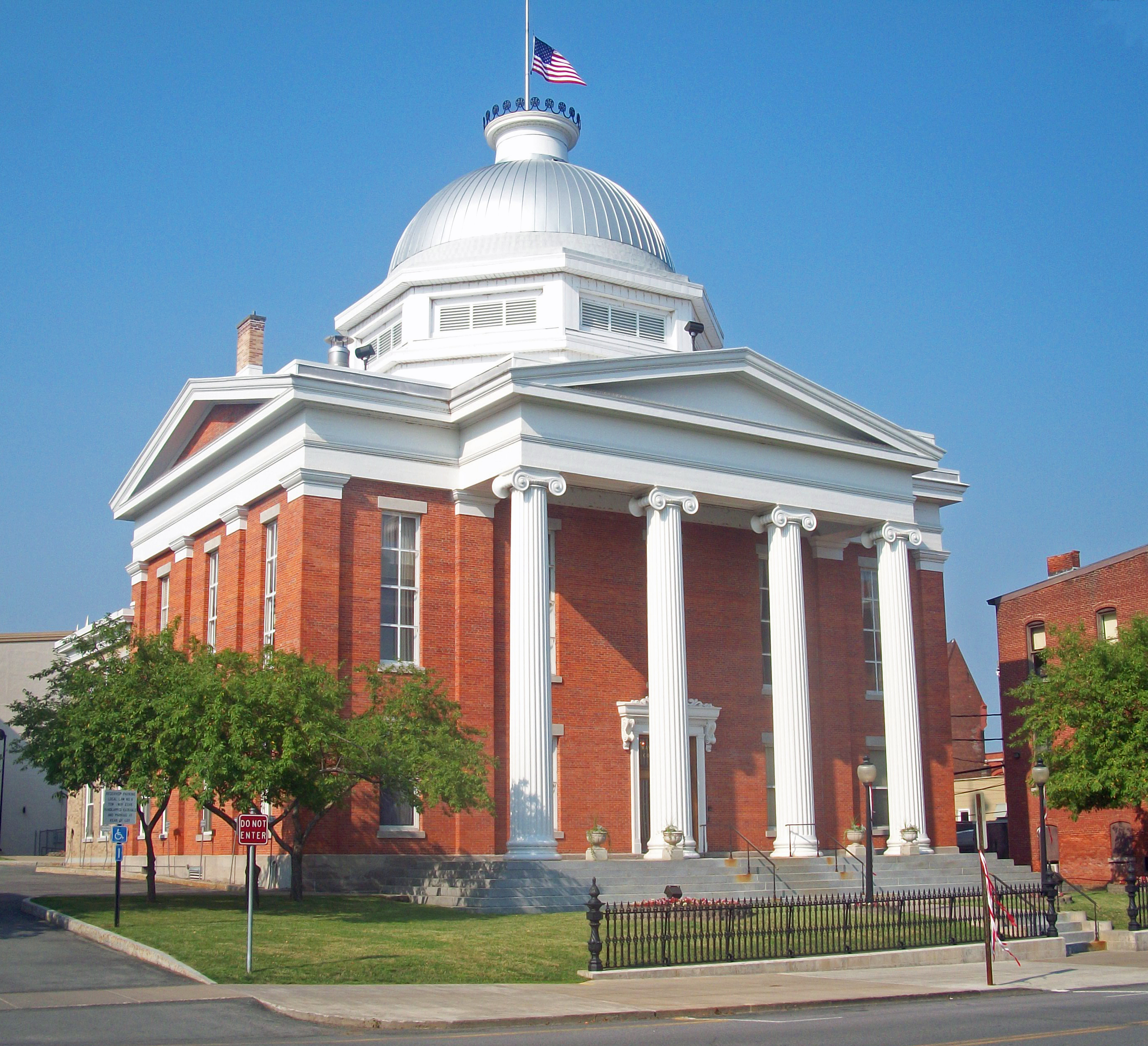
- Wayne County Courthouse

- Location in Wayne County and the state of New York.

- Location within the state of New York
- Coordinates: 43°03′48″N 76°59′27″W
- Country: United States
- State: New York
- County: Wayne
- Town: Lyons
- Settled: May 1789
- Incorporated: April 18, 1854
- Dissolved: December 31, 2015
- Named for: Lyon, France

Area
  - Total: 4.1 sq mi (10.7 km^{2})
  - Land: 4.1 sq mi (10.5 km^{2})
  - Water: 0.077 sq mi (0.2 km^{2})
- Elevation: 410 ft (125 m)

Population (2010)
  - Total: 3,619
  - Density: 893/sq mi (344.7/km^{2})
- Time zone: UTC−5 (EST)
  - Summer (DST): UTC−4 (EDT)
- ZIP Code(s): 14489
- Area codes: 315 and 680
- FIPS code: 36-43962
- GNIS feature ID: 0956197

Lyons is a hamlet (and census-designated place) in Wayne County, New York, United States. The population was 3,989 at the 2020 census. It is located in the southern half of the town of Lyons. The hamlet and the town are named after Lyon (sometimes spelled Lyons), France. Originally named "The Forks", Lyons was renamed by land agent George Williamson.

Lyons is the county seat of Wayne County. It was an incorporated village from 1854 through 2015. The hamlet is east of the city of Rochester.

Government offices for the Town of Lyons are located in the hamlet.

== History ==
The community was settled circa 1789 and incorporated as a village in 1854. The Erie Canal, which once went through the center of the village, was rerouted to the south when it was enlarged in the 1850s. Later, the canal conformed roughly to the bed of the Clyde River. On November 6, 2012, Lyons village residents passed a proposal to dissolve the village into the surrounding town by a 569–524 margin.

The H. G. Hotchkiss Essential Oil Company Plant, Grace Episcopal Church Complex, Broad Street–Water Street Historic District, and U.S. Post Office are listed on the National Register of Historic Places. In 1986, parts of two films were shot in Lyons. The Spanish film Slugs filmed in Lyons for its quaint American look and Lady in White, to take advantage of the historic, preserved atmosphere.

Lyons is part of the Erie Canalway National Heritage Corridor. Erie Canal Lock 27 is located below the bridge on Leach Road, just off N.Y. Route 31. It was built in approximately 1913, and has a lift of 12.5 feet (3.81 m) to the west.

Lyons celebrates Peppermint Days in mid-July to memorialize the region's past fame in producing this crop.

=== Dissolution ===
In 2012, a coalition of bipartisan taxpayers formed OneLyons, a group seeking to dissolve the village. They circulated a petition to force a dissolution vote after the village did not follow up on a 2010 Center for Governmental Research Study showing that significant tax savings were possible and further efficiencies could be achieved. In November 2012, the village voted to dissolve, beginning a process under the 2009 NYS Government Reorganization and Citizen Empowerment Act pushed by Governor Cuomo and Championed by Senators Nozzolio and Robach as well as local Assemblyman Bob Oaks of North Rose.

In 2013, the Village of Lyons formed a dissolution committee and chose a consultant. Per NYS Law, the Village of Lyons had until June 25, 2013, to prepare and approve a dissolution plan, and until July 2 to present it to the village residents.

On June 28, 2013, the OneLyons group filed a petition in New York State Supreme Court requesting the court declare the village in violation of GML 17-A. Acting Supreme Court Judge Nesbitt held two hearings, and ordered the Village of Lyons to complete a dissolution plan by October 20, 2013.

OneLyons appealed Judge Nesbitt's decision granting additional time to the village citing the New York State Law and asserting that the judge did not have a legal basis to grant time extensions, and that the judge exceeded the discretion he was allowed by law. The Village of Lyons responded to the appeal by asking the NYS Supreme Court Appellate Division, 4th Judicial Department out of Rochester NY to dismiss the Appeal as Moot. On December 6, 2013, five judges of the Appellate Division decided the case had enough grounds and merit to move forward, ordered the Village of Lyons to reply, but reserved the right to still dismiss the case as moot. In 2014, the Appellate Court 4th Department in Rochester dismissed the lawsuit noting that since the Village of Lyons had ultimately complied, then further challenge was not allowed regardless of the evidence.

'Save the Village of Lyons', an anti-dissolution group, organized and led by Police Chief Richard Bogan and Police Clerk Helen Weimer to force a second referendum on dissolution, succeeded with enough votes. However, the OneLyons pro-dissolution group initiated a second lawsuit under Article 78 proceedings challenging the validity of the Village Certification process and claiming gross irregularities, fraud, intimidation, and multiple conflicts of interest. The OneLyons group was presented extensive evidence in support of its positions that can be reviewed on their website at www.onelyons.com. Ultimately, Judge Nesbitt deferred his discretion to the Clerk of the Village who had personally signed and been involved in the anti-dissolution movement, ruling that since she used the proper criteria then there was no further reason to doubt the validity of her decisions. Further, Judge Nesbitt ruled that since none of the citizens appeared before the court willing to testify regarding fraud, intimidation, and conflicts of interest, then there was insufficient reason for the court to intervene.

A second vote on dissolution occurred in March 2014 resulted in a YES vote of 519–353.

The Village of Lyons officially dissolved on December 31, 2015. All government activities previously managed by the village are now handled by the Town of Lyons.

== Geography ==
According to the United States Census Bureau, the hamlet has a total area of 4.2 square miles (10.7 km^{2}), of which 4.1 square miles (10.5 km^{2}) is land and 0.1 square mile (0.2 km^{2}) (2.17%) is water.

The hamlet is located on the Erie Canal and served by New York State Route 14 (NY 14), a north–south highway which intersects east–west NY 31 south of the hamlet center.

== Demographics ==
Historical population
Census	Pop.	Note	%±
1870	3,350		—
1880	3,820		14.0%
1890	4,475		17.1%
1900	4,300		−3.9%
1910	4,460		3.7%
1920	4,253		−4.6%
1930	3,956		−7.0%
1940	3,863		−2.4%
1950	4,217		9.2%
1960	4,673		10.8%
1970	4,496		−3.8%
1980	4,160		−7.5%
1990	4,280		2.9%
2000	3,695		−13.7%
2010	3,619		−2.1%
2018 (est.)	3,494		−3.5%
U.S. Decennial Census

As of the census of 2010, there were 3,619 people, 1,521 households, and 902 families residing in what was then a village. The population density was 882.7 inhabitants per square mile (340.8/km^{2}). The racial makeup of the village was 83.8% White, 10.6% Black or African American, 0.3% Native American, 0.3% Asian, 0.0% Pacific Islander, 2.0% from other races, and 3.0% from two or more races. Hispanic or Latino of any race were 5.0% of the population.

There were 1,521 households, out of which 26.7% had children under the age of 18 living with them, 36.3% were married couples living together, 17.0% had a female householder with no husband present, and 40.7% were non-families. 33.3% of all households were made up of individuals, and 12.3% had someone living alone who was 65 years of age or older. The average household size was 2.36 and the average family size was 2.95.

In the village, the population was spread out, with 27.3% under the age of 20, 6.2% from 20 to 24, 24.5% from 25 to 44, 27.8% from 45 to 64, and 14.3% who were 65 years of age or older. The median age was 39.3 years. For every 100 females, there were 92.4 males. For every 100 females age 18 and over, there were 93.1 males.

The median income for a household in the village was $30,813, and the median income for a family was $49,306. Males had a median income of $39,318 versus $31,673 for females. The per capita income for the village was $19,669. About 17.3% of families and 22.2% of the population were below the poverty line, including 33.3% of those under age 18 and 12.9% of those age 65 or over.

=== Housing ===
There were 1,716 housing units at an average density of 418.5 per square mile (161.6/km^{2}); a total of 11.4% of housing units were vacant.

There were 1,521 occupied housing units in the village. 875 were owner-occupied units (57.5%), while 646 were renter-occupied (42.5%). The homeowner vacancy rate was 2.3% of total units. The rental unit vacancy rate was 13.0%.
