= St. Timothy's Episcopal Church, Roxborough =

Episcopal church in Roxborough, Pennsylvania, United States

St. Timothy's Church
- St. Timothy's Episcopal Church
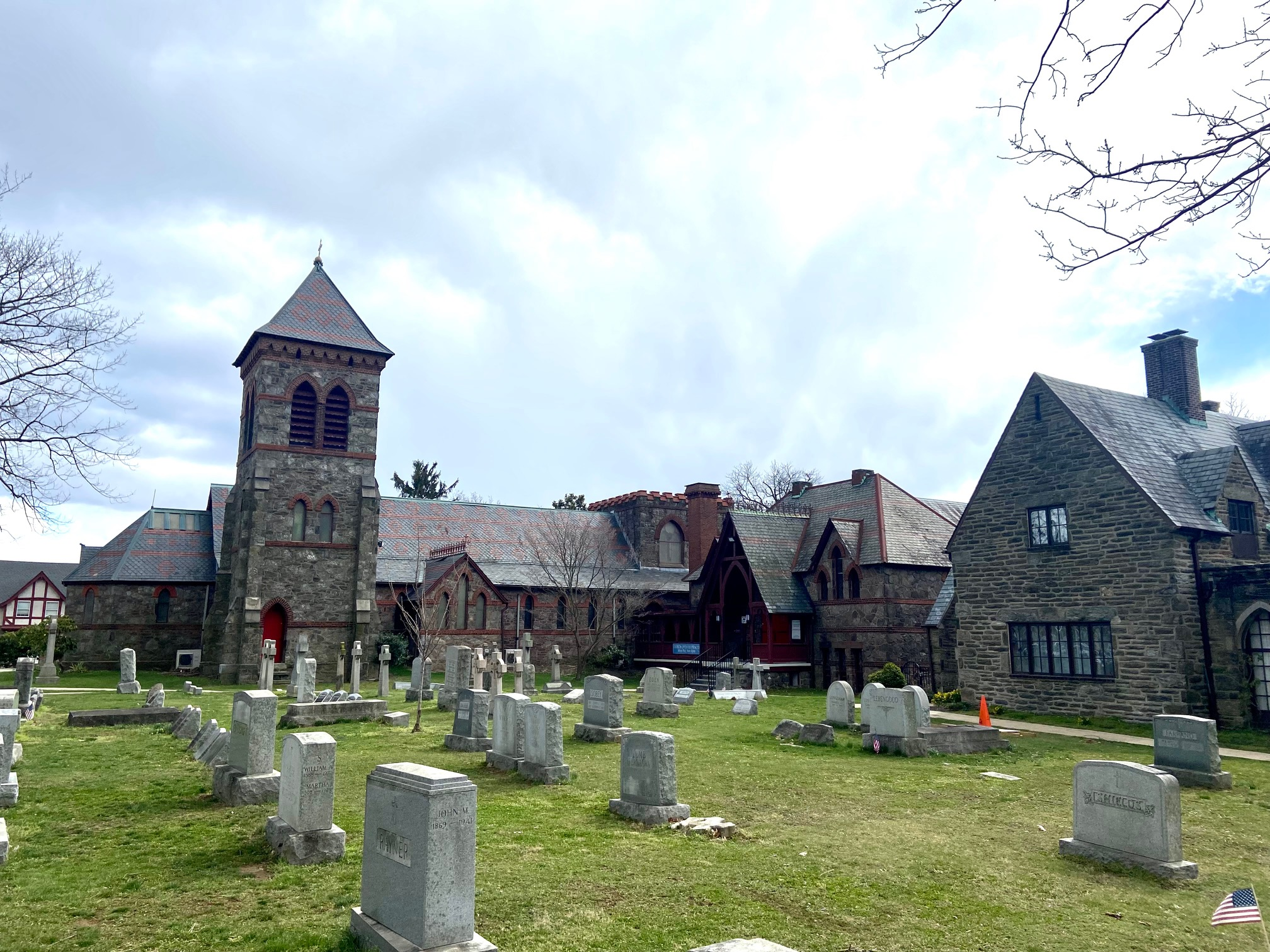
- St Timothy's Episcopal Church, Roxborough, April 24, 2022

- Location within Pennsylvania Location within the United States
- 40.027742939204245°N 75.2097539391737°W
- Location: 5720 Ridge Ave. Philadelphia, Pennsylvania
- Country: United States
- Denomination: Episcopal
- Website: www.sttimsrox.com

History
- Founded: 1859
- Dedication: Saint Timothy
- Consecrated: February 14, 1863

Architecture
- Architect: Emlen T. Littelll
- Years built: 1862-1863

St. Timothy's Church, Roxborough is a parish of the Episcopal Diocese of Pennsylvania in the Roxborough neighborhood of Philadelphia, Pennsylvania, United States. It is part of the Wissahickon Deanery of the Diocese of Pennsylvania. In 1962, St. Timothy's reported membership of 1,144 and weekly attendance of 849. In 2024, the parish reported average Sunday attendance (ASA) of 40, plate and pledge financial support of $54,667, and a 2023 membership statistic of 90 persons.

It was founded in 1859 by lay members of St. Mark's Church, Locust Street with a Tractarian High Church ethos including free pew sittings. The first services were conducted by a priest from St. David's Episcopal Church in Manayunk. Financial difficulties required the adoption of a pew-rental system in 1863. The parish had a historically Anglo-Catholic character, adopting an early weekly celebration of the Holy Communion in 1869, with the main Sunday service becoming Holy Communion in 1909. In 1893 the Anglo-Catholic Sisterhood of the Holy Nativity, affiliated with the Cowley Fathers (Society of St. John the Evangelist) began work in the parish and at the adjacent St. Timothy's Hospital.

The cornerstone for the church building was laid on July 18, 1862 by Bishop Alonzo Potter. The church was consecrated by Bishop William Bacon Stevens on February 14, 1863, as one of his early official episcopal acts. Its architect was Emlen T. Littell, who also built New York's Church of the Incarnation, Zion Episcopal Church, Palmyra, New York, St. Paul's Episcopal Church, Poughkeepsie and many other buildings with a parish Gothic style. A vandal attempted to blow up the church in 1899 using its municipal gas-light supply.

The studios of Victorian Anglo-Catholic stained glass artist Charles Eamer Kempe (1837-1907) designed the majority of the church's windows as memorials to members of the local Merrick and Cope families. The stations of the cross are the work of Thorsten Sigstedt (1884-1963), a Swedish American woodcarver with studios in Bryn Athyn, Pennsylvania. The first burials in the adjacent cemetery, which is active in 2022, began in 1863. A two-manual organ by Frank Roosevelt (Opus 367) was installed in 1887; in 2006 a 1967 Wicks/1997 Buzard organ with three manuals, 32 stops, 36 ranks from First Baptist Church in Decatur, Illinois was installed.

== Rectors ==
1. John Leighton McKim 1860-1862
2. Samuel Hall 1863-1867
3. William Augustus White 1867-1877
4. Robert Evans Dennison 1878-1907
5. James Biddle Halsey 1908-1919
6. Sidney Atmore Caine 1919-1930
7. George Herbert Dennison 1930-1934
8. Edmund Bacon Wood 1934-1952
9. John Robert Rockett 1952-1958
10. Theron Adair Vallee 1958-1960
11. Eugene Francis Lefebvre 1960-1992 (died 2018)
12. Charles J. Blauvelt
13. Kirk T. Berlenbach 2003-2017
14. Bonnie McCrickard 2018—2023
15. Meghan Mazur 2025—

== See also ==
- St. David's Church, Manayunk
- Church of St. Alban, Roxborough
- St. Peter's Episcopal Church of Germantown
- St. Alban's Church, Olney
