= Church of St. Alban, Roxborough =

Church in Roxborough, Pennsylvania, United States

Church of St. Alban the Martyr
- St. Alban's Episcopal Church
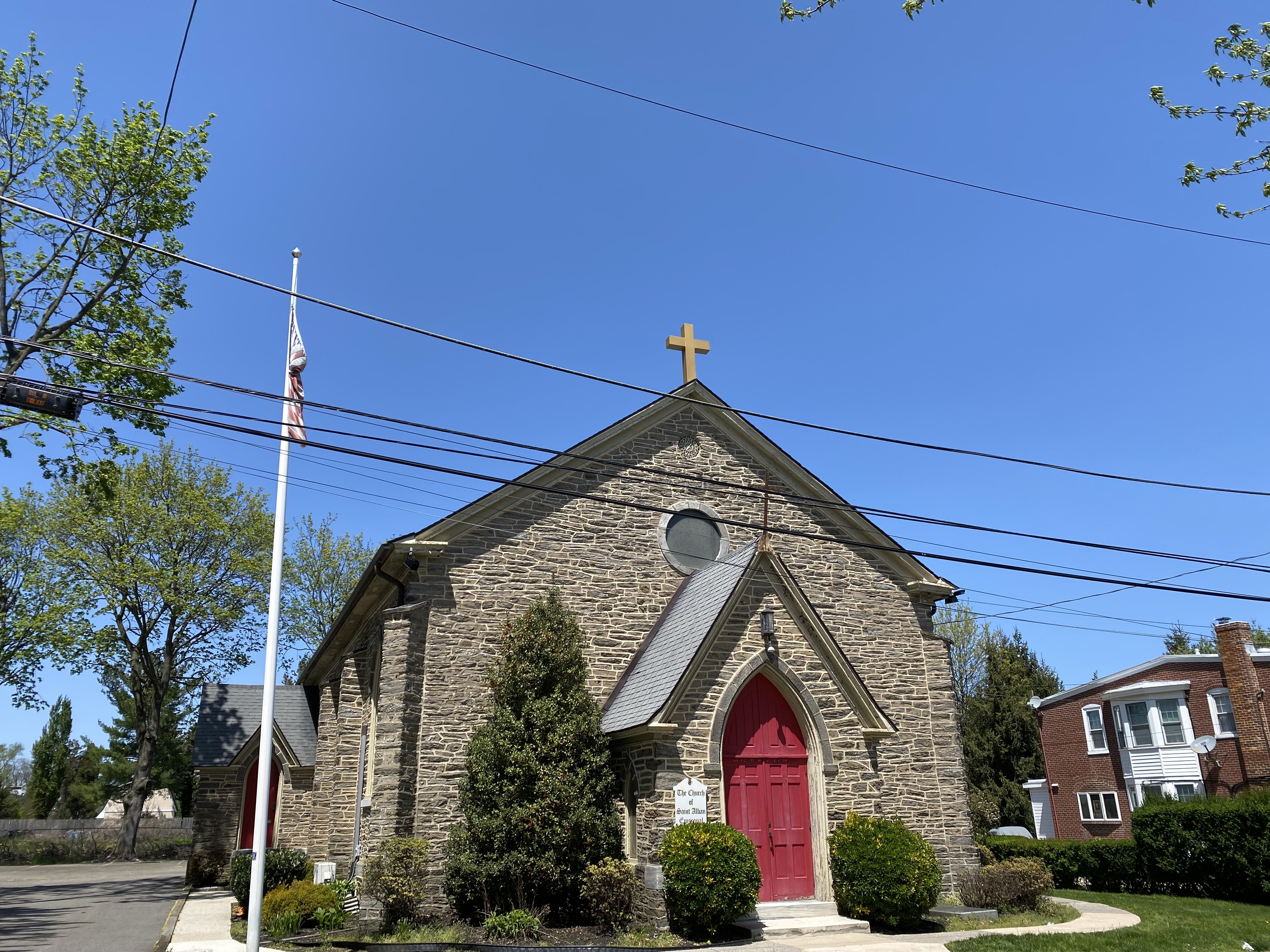

- Location within Pennsylvania Location within the United States
- 40.043381741369295°N 75.22175877977642°W
- Location: 532 Fairthorne Ave. Philadelphia, Pennsylvania
- Country: United States
- Denomination: Episcopal
- Website: www.churchofstalban.com

History
- Founded: 1859
- Dedication: St. Alban the Protomartyr of England
- Earlier dedication: St. Peter
- Consecrated: January 14, 1862

Architecture
- Architect: Alfred Byles
- Years built: 1860-1861
- Groundbreaking: September 15, 1860
- Completed: October 13, 1861

The Church of St. Alban, Roxborough is a parish of the Episcopal Diocese of Pennsylvania in the Roxborough neighborhood of Philadelphia, Pennsylvania. It was founded in 1859 as a chapel of ease of St. David's Episcopal Church in Manayunk, initially with a dedication to St. Peter. The cornerstone for the church building was laid on September 15, 1860, and the church was consecrated by Bishop William Bacon Stevens on January 14, 1862, as his first official episcopal act, having himself been consecrated to the episcopate six days earlier. Its architect was Alfred Byles, who also designed the Fifth Baptist Church at the corner of Eighteenth and Spring Garden in Philadelphia.

During the twentieth century, St. Alban's was nicknamed "Roxborough's Little Church Around the Corner," a reference to the Church of the Transfiguration in New York City as a small and uncharacteristically open parish.

The tracker action organ at St. Alban's is Hook & Hastings Opus 1750 from 1897. Several of the church's stained glass windows are by Paula Himmelsbach Balano (1877-1967), a German-American church artist working in a medium uncommon for women at the time of her installations. The sanctuary is designed to accommodate ad orientem celebration.

During the COVID-19 pandemic, St. Alban's began and maintained a regimen of daily Morning Prayer from the Book of Common Prayer broadcast on Facebook. The parish is a supporter of the St. James School at the former Church of St. James the Less in East Falls. It is part of the Wissahickon Deanery of the Diocese of Pennsylvania.

The church reported 176 members in 2021 and 151 members in 2023. St. Alban's did not file a 2024 parochial report. Plate and pledge income reported for the congregation in 2023 was $30,972, down from $78,604 in 2022. Average Sunday attendance (ASA) in 2023 was 20 persons, down from a reported 48 in 2020.

The parish is served by supply clergy.

== Notable parishioners and clergy ==
- First Lieutenant Joshua Simster Garsed (1839-1863), Union Army casualty at the Battle of Gettysburg
- Charles R. Hale (1837-1900), liturgist, theologian, ecumenist, and coadjutor bishop of the Episcopal Diocese of Springfield from 1892 to 1900.

== See also ==
- St. David's Episcopal Church, Manayunk
- St. Timothy's Episcopal Church, Roxborough
- St. Peter's Episcopal Church of Germantown
- St. Alban's Episcopal Church, Newtown Square
- St. Alban's Church, Olney
