= House of Prayer Episcopal Church, Philadelphia =

Church in Philadelphia, Pennsylvania, United States

House of Prayer
- House of Prayer Episcopal Church
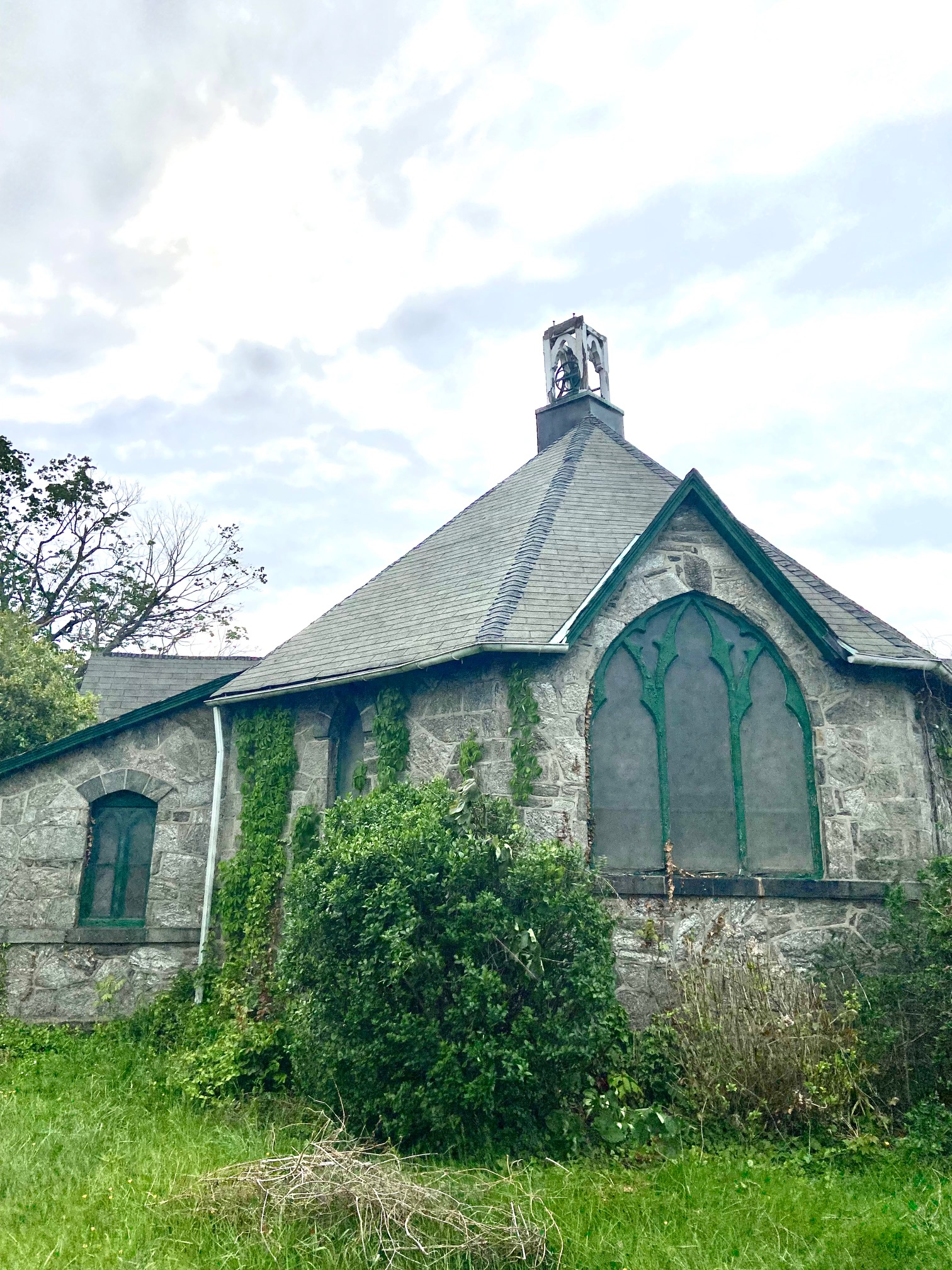

- Location within Pennsylvania Location within the United States
- 40.013530360308316°N 75.27290930670404°W
- Location: 1747 Church Ln. Philadelphia, Pennsylvania 19141
- Country: United States
- Denomination: Episcopal
- Website: houseofprayerepiscopal.weebly.com

History
- Founded: 1860
- Dedication: House of Prayer
- Consecrated: July 14, 1863

Architecture
- Architect: Emlen T. Littell
- Years built: 1862-1863
- Groundbreaking: September 3, 1862 (cornerstone laid)

House of Prayer Episcopal Church in Branchtown/Ogontz neighborhood of Philadelphia is an historically African American church in the Episcopal Diocese of Pennsylvania near La Salle University. It was founded as a mission of St. Luke's, Germantown in 1860. It has a small adjacent cemetery for members of the Barclay family. Its name is taken from Isaiah 56:7, Matthew 21:13, Mark 11:17, and Luke 19:46: "Mine house shall be called a house of prayer for all people."

The church building was designed by noted New York City architect Emlen T. Littell (1838-1891), whose brother was its first rector. The completed church was consecrated on July 14, 1863, by Bishop William Bacon Stevens. The rectory was built in 1908, and a large parish house was added in 1925. In 1941, a "catacombs chapel" was installed in the basement by rector the Rev. Dr. Howard M. Stuckert.

A 1964 diocesan report described the Branchtown neighborhood as "formerly Jewish, now predominantly Negro." In 1964, the parish had 287 members. In 2023, the parish reported 25 members; in 2024 it reported 13 average Sunday attendance (ASA), with $12,767 in plate and pledge financial support.

The church has had a number of internal organizations, including Scouting groups for boys and girls, Episcopal Church Women, the Brotherhood of St. Andrew for men, the Girls' Friendly Society, and the Confraternity of the Blessed Sacrament.

== See also ==
- House of Prayer Episcopal Church and Rectory, Newark, New Jersey
- Episcopal House of Prayer, Diocese of Minnesota retreat center, Collegeville, Minnesota
- St. James House of Prayer Episcopal Church, Tampa, Florida
