= St. John's Episcopal Church, Canandaigua =

Episcopal Church In Western New York

Coordinates: 42°53′37.48″N 77°17′5.46″W

St. John's Episcopal Church

Religion
- Affiliation: The Episcopal Church

Location
- Location: Canandaigua (city), New York
- Interactive map of St. John's Episcopal Church

Architecture
- Architect: Emlen T. Littell
- Type: Church
- Style: Gothic Revival
- Completed: 1872

Specifications
- Direction of façade: West
- Materials: Limestone, Stained glass, slate roof

Website
- https://www.stjohnscanandaigua.org/

St. John's Episcopal Church is an episcopal church in Canandaigua, New York. It was built in 1872.

== History ==
The Episcopal presence in Canandaigua, New York began, formally, in February, 1799 with the formation of St. Matthew's Episcopal Mission. In 1814, St. John's Episcopal Church was organized and first met in the Ontario County, New York Court House in Canandaigua. St. John's erected a wooden church building in 1816. Bishop John Henry Hobart consecrated it that year.

Steady congregational growth necessitated more space. This led to the razing of the first church and the constructing of the current larger stone Gothic building done in the parish church style popular in the 19th century. Emlen T. Littell of New York City designed the building. This church was constructed in 1872 at a cost of $47,000 and consecrated in 1886. It contains several windows from the earlier wooden church, elaborate new stained glass windows imported from Europe, and one—The Parables Window—was designed by Daniel Cottier, who was considered an important influence on Louis Comfort Tiffany.

In 1908, new hardwood floors, choir stalls, and an organ were installed. The parish house and a chapel were added at the same time. In 1964-1965, an addition to parish house included classrooms, a new chapel, and a dining/ meeting room added to celebrate the church's 150th anniversary. Recent additions include a columbarium with a capacity of 136 niches and a memorial garden, outside the church. A capital campaign begun in 2017 allowed the parish to upgrade and improve five areas identified by parishioners as essential priorities.

== Historical timeline ==
=== Old Church ===
Original wooden St. John's Church, Canandaigua

1796 — Missionary services begun in Canandaigua by Robert G. Wetmore

1799 — February 4, first Episcopal congregation in Canandaigua, St. Matthew's, organized by The Right Rev. Philander Chase, Bishop.

1814 — September 27, St. John's Church organized. Met in courthouse.

1816 — December 12, first church building consecrated by Bishop John Henry Hobart; a wooden gothic structure on site of present church, costing $14,000.

1815 — The Rev. Alanson Welton, Rector.

1815 - 1819 — The Rev. Dr. Henry Ustick Onderdonk, Rector.

1820 — The Rev. William Barlow, Rector.

1834 — First Rectory on Gibson Street. House given by Mr. Grieg moved from N. Main Street to lot given by Mr. Gibson.

1836 - 1842 — The Rev. Augustus Palmer Prevost, Rector.

1844 — The Rev. Joseph Wayland, Rector

1850 — Trinity Church, Wall Street (NYC) gifts St John's $1,500.

1851 — Present Rectory build at cost of $4,000.

1867 — Church enlarged with 26 additional pews, repaired, painted, stoves removed and furnace added. Cost over $16,000.

1869 - 1875 — The Rev. C. M. Nickerson, Rector.

=== New Church ===
1872 — Original church torn down. New church erected, of stone with spire atop tower. Cost of $47,000 left parish with large debt. The present church was designed by Emlyn T. Littell of New York City. St. John's is built of various kinds of stone and its intricate and colorful display of stained glass windows is one of the most impressive in this area.

1880 — Bell installed as memorial to Moses Atwater, first Warden, by descendants

1886 — May 6, church consecrated after payment of debt.

1892 - 1905 — The Rev. Charles J. Clausen, Rector.

1895 — Permanent endowment fund established with legacy of $1,000, "interest only to be applied to current expense of the church."

1907 — The Rev. Herbert Gaylord became Rector, serving for 32 years.

1908 — Hardwood floors, choir stalls, and organ installed in church. New Parish house and chapel built.

St. John's Church, Canandaigua, about 1910.

1923 — Rectory repaired and improved at cost of $15,000.

1928 — Spire removed from church building after being found unsafe.

1939 - 1944 — The Rev. Eugene Marsden Chapman, Rector

1940 — Chapel established in south transept of church in memory of Frances Paul.

1944 - 1959 — The Rev. Robert C. Dunn, Rector

1959 - 1970 — The Rev. Harold D. Avery, Rector

St. John's Church, Main Window above altar.

1951 — Church building completely redecorated.

1965 — Addition to parish house providing 5 classrooms, chapel, and dining/meeting room. Organ rebuilt.

1970 - 1986 — The Rev. Robert W. Withington, Rector. Rectory named for him.

1986 - 1990 — The Rev. James A. Hubbard, Rector.

1992 - 1993 — Restoration of stained glass windows

1993 - 2008 — The Rev. Albert J. Keeney, Rector

2000 — Major restoration of Nave

2008 - 2013 — The Rev. Richard D. Krapf, Deacon

2010 — May. Columbarium and chapel dedicated and blessed by the Right Reverend Prince Grenville Singh, Ph.D., Bishop of Rochester.

2010 — 2024. The Rev David Hefling, AOJN+, Rector

2011 — Complete redesign/restructuring of the parish hall to expand space and use as a reception area. Garden is designed and developed in backyard for Gleaners Community Kitchen use. Gardening program is launched as is "Red Wagon Food Pantry" - both to benefit Gleaners Kitchen.

2012 — Chapel is named, by Vestry vote, "All Saints Chapel."

2013 - 2014 — St. John's Bicentennial (1814 - 2014).

2018 — The Rev Patti Blaine, Deacon, is assigned to the parish by Bishop Singh.

2020 - The Rev Keisha Stokes joins the staff as Pastoral Associate.

2025 - The Rev Dr Richard Laribee, Interim rector
