= Ogontz, Philadelphia =

Ogontz
- Neighborhood of Philadelphia
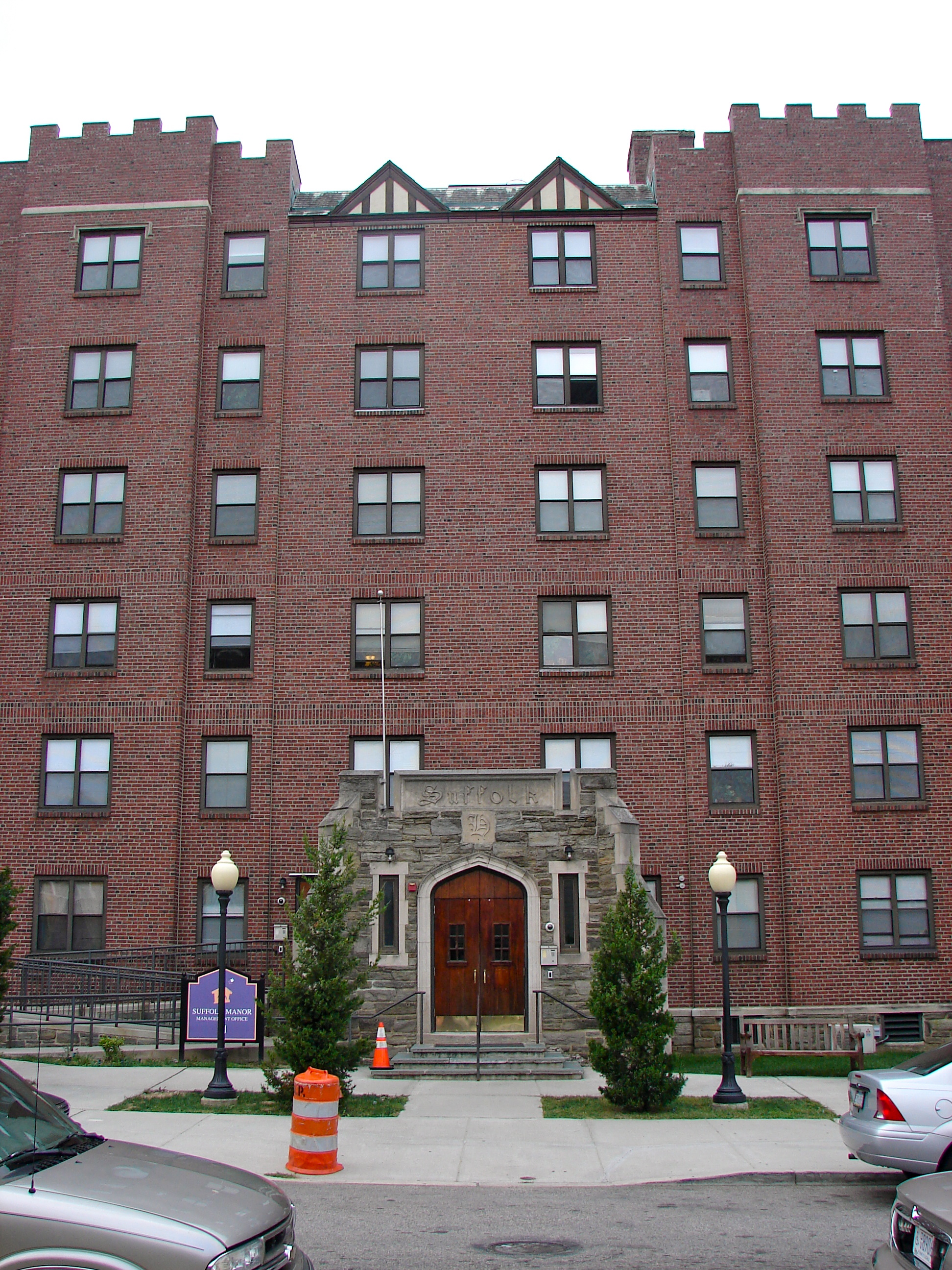
- Suffolk Manor Apartments in Ogontz, September 2010

- Location within Philadelphia
- Country: United States
- State: Pennsylvania
- County: Philadelphia
- City: Philadelphia
- Area codes: 215, 267, and 445

Ogontz/Belfield is a neighborhood in Upper Northern Philadelphia that is located adjacent to West Oak Lane, East Germantown, Logan, and Fern Rock, Philadelphia, Pennsylvania, United States.

== History ==
Ogontz comes from the name of a Native American chieftain from Seneca who was a companion to banker Jay Cooke, who named the neighborhood he settled in in his honor.

According to Philadelphia Department of Records, Belfield is located in the "vicinity of Chelten and Olney Avenues, Wister Street and Ogontz Avenue. Named for the Belfield Mansion". Ogontz is "from Ogontz Avenue to Broad Street above Olney Avenue". Ogontz gets its name from Ogontz Avenue, a thoroughfare which runs diagonally through the uniform grid of streets in the city. Many of the commercial and residential properties on Ogontz Ave. began to decline in the early 1970s, but revitalization efforts have largely restored it to being an important destination for the surrounding community. Ogontz Avenue joins Pennsylvania Route 309 (old US 309), a limited access expressway, after it crosses into the suburbs.

The Ogontz theatre, built in 1926-1927, was located at 6033 Ogontz Avenue; it was closed in 1988 and then torn down.

The Central High School, Special Troops Armory, and Suffolk Manor Apartments are listed on the National Register of Historic Places.

== Boundaries ==
•Bounded by Broad Street (beyond lay Fern Rock, Philadelphia)

•Bounded by Olney Avenue (beyond lay Logan, Philadelphia)

•Bounded by Stenton Avenue (beyond lay West Oak Lane, Philadelphia)

•Bounded by Wister Street (beyond lay East Germantown, Philadelphia)

== Education ==
Central High School, Philadelphia, Widener Memorial School, and Philadelphia School for Girls are located just south of the neighborhood. Since La Salle University is located on both sides of Olney Avenue, it is partially in Ogontz/Belfield. Imhotep Charter High School, Joseph Pennell Elementary, Ogontz Academy, and Prince Hall Elementary are all located within the neighborhood.

== Public libraries ==
Free Library of Philadelphia operates the David Cohen Ogontz Branch at 6017 Ogontz Avenue at Church Lane.

== Recreation ==
Belfield Recreation Center, Belfield Park, and Kemble Park are located in the neighborhood.

== See also ==
- House of Prayer Episcopal Church, Philadelphia
