= Church of the Incarnation, Episcopal (Manhattan) =

Church in Manhattan, New York

- Church of the Incarnation (Episcopal) and Parish House
- U.S. National Register of Historic Places
- U.S. Historic district – Contributing property
- New York State Register of Historic Places
- New York City Landmark
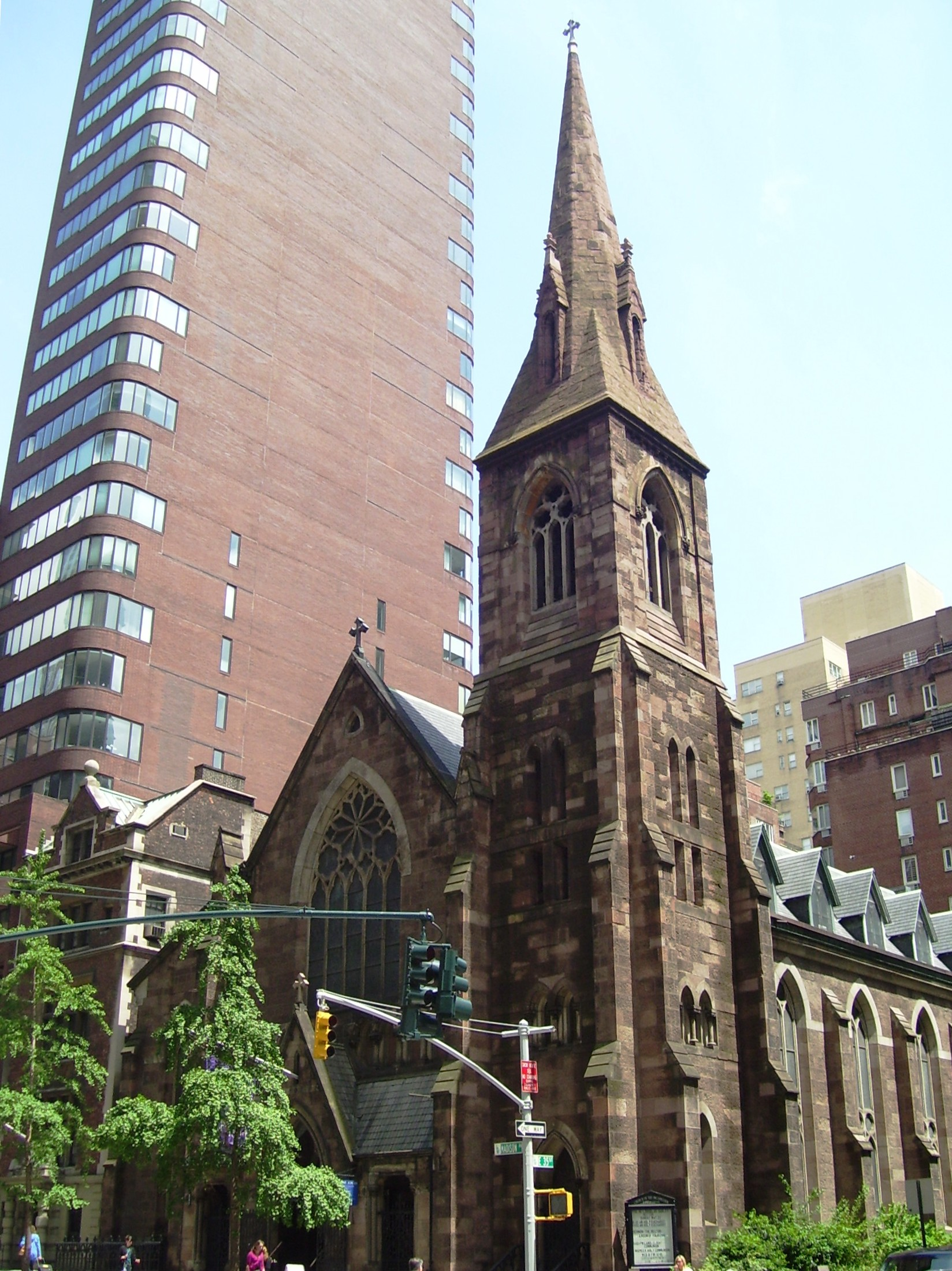
- (2011)

- Location within New York City Location within New York Location within the United States
- Location: 205–209 Madison Ave. Manhattan, New York
- Coordinates: 40°44′55″N 73°58′56″W
- Built: 1864–1865
- Architect: church (1865): Emlen T. Littell rectory (1868): Robert Mook re-building (1882): David Jardine spire (1896): Heins & LaFarge (consulting architects) rectory (1905–1906): Edward P. Casey
- Architectural style: church: Late Gothic Revival rectory: Neo-Jacobean
- Part of: Murray Hill Historic District (ID03000997)
- NRHP reference No.: 82003371
- NYSRHP No.: 06101.001683
- NYCL No.: 1046

Significant dates
- Added to NRHP: July 8, 1982
- Designated CP: February 27, 2013
- Designated NYSRHP: May 28, 1982
- Designated NYCL: September 11, 1979

The Church of the Incarnation is a historic Episcopal church at 205–209 Madison Avenue at the northeast corner of 35th Street in the Murray Hill neighborhood of Manhattan, New York City. The church was founded in 1850 as a chapel of Grace Church located at 28th Street and Madison. In 1852, it became an independent parish, and in 1864–1865 the parish built its own sanctuary at its current location.

In 2020, it reported 505 members, average attendance of 109, and $241,642 in plate and pledge income. In 2024, the church reported average Sunday attendance (ASA) of 68 with plate and pledge financial support of $314,276. The most recent membership statistics showed 231 members.

== Notable parishioners ==
Notable among the parishioners of the church were Admiral David Farragut and Eleanor Roosevelt, who was confirmed in the church. The funeral for Sara Roosevelt, the mother of Franklin Delano Roosevelt, was held at the church, and a ramp was built so that FDR could attend. Several prominent families had pews and have memorials in the church, including the Delanos, Langdons, Sedgwicks, Seaburys, Brooks, and Rikers families.

== Buildings ==
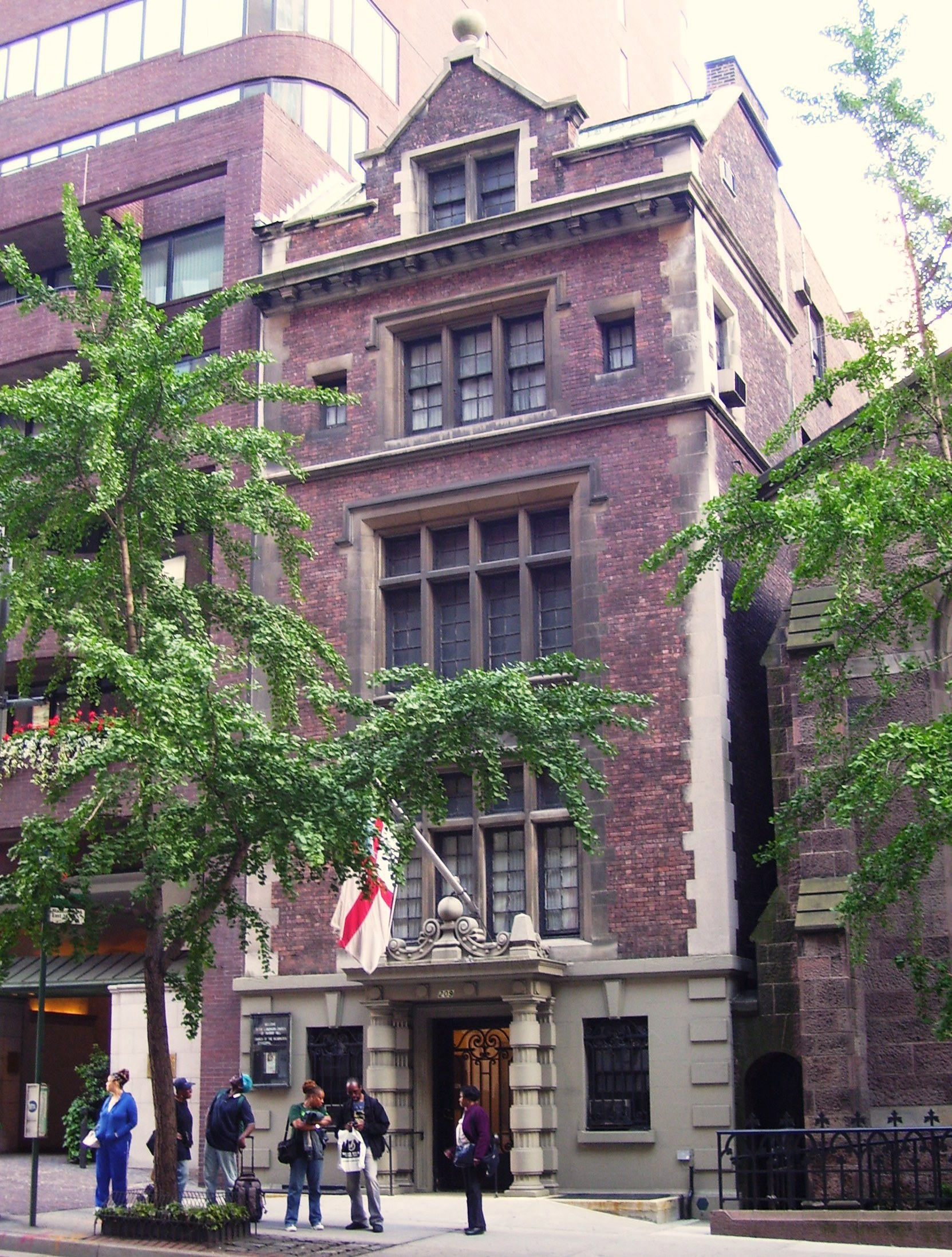
The parish house

The sanctuary was built in 1864–1865, and was designed by Emlen T. Littell. It was "distinguished for both its architecture and refined interior decoration and artwork." The cornerstone was laid on March 8, 1864, by Bishop Horatio Potter of the Episcopal Diocese of New York, the first services were held on December 11, and the church was consecrated on April 20, 1865. The church rectory was constructed in 1868–1869, designed by Robert Mook.

Except for its tower and walls, the building was destroyed by a fire which began on March 24, 1882. It was rebuilt and enlarged by David Jardine, with a spire added in 1896 by Heins & LaFarge following Jardine's designs. In 1905–1906, the church rectory was rebuilt and received a new facade in Neo-Jacobean style designed by Edward P. Casey. It is now the H. Percy Silver Parish House.

The building was designated a New York City landmark in 1979, and was added to the National Register of Historic Places in 1982. In 1991, a renovation of the building was supervised by Jan Hird Pokorny.

== Artworks ==
The church contains artwork by noted Victorian artists including Louis Comfort Tiffany, John Lafarge, Augustus Saint-Gaudens, Edward Burne-Jones, William Morris, Daniel Chester French and Henry Hobson Richardson.

=== Stained glass windows ===
A list of stained glass windows by various artists of the Victorian Era.

South Wall

1. "Christ's Resurrection and Ascension" by Henry Holiday Company
2. "Moses and the Law" by Heaton, Butler & Bayne
3. "St. Paul on Mars Hill" by Clayton & Bell
4. "Christ Calling Peter and Paul" by John LaFarge
5. "Christian Nurturing" by Henry Holiday Company
6. "God as a Good Vintner" by John LaFarge
7. "Infant Children" by William Morris of Morris & Company
8. "The Pilgrim" by Louis Comfort Tiffany
9. "Apostles" by Heaton, Butler & Bayne

North Wall

1. "Faith & Charity" by Edward Burne-Jones, Henry Holiday of London
2. "Feeding the multitudes" by Cottin & Company
3. "Love of Christ", designer unknown
4. "Victory over Death" by Tiffany Studios
5. "23rd Psalm" by Tiffany Studios
6. "Samuel"by Guthrie and Davis

West Wall

1. "Dignity of Labor" by Tiffany Studios
2. "Great West Window" by Charles Eamer Kempe

== See also ==
- National Register of Historic Places listings in Manhattan from 14th to 59th Streets
- List of New York City Designated Landmarks in Manhattan from 14th to 59th Streets
