= Special Troops Armory =

- U.S. National Register of Historic Places
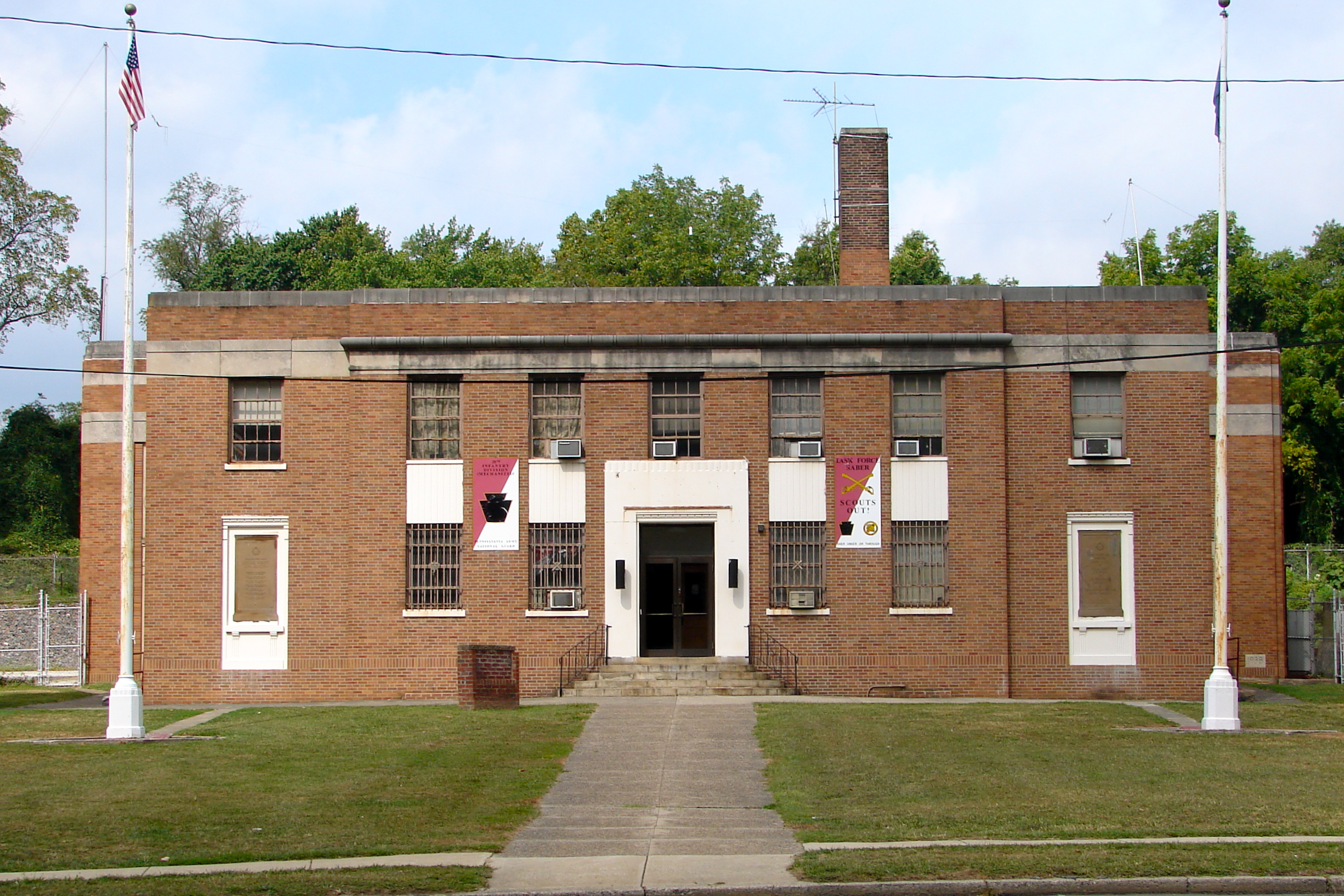
- Special Troops Armory, September 2010

- Location within Philadelphia Location within Pennsylvania Location within the United States
- Location: 5350 Ogontz Ave., Philadelphia, Pennsylvania
- Coordinates: 40.035°N 75.151°W
- Area: 2.8 acres (1.1 ha)
- Built: 1938
- Architectural style: Moderne
- MPS: Pennsylvania National Guard Armories MPS
- NRHP reference No.: 91001702
- Added to NRHP: November 14, 1991

The Special Troops Armory, also known as the Philadelphia Armory, was an historic National Guard armory building that is located in the Ogontz neighborhood of Philadelphia, Pennsylvania, United States.

It was added to the National Register of Historic Places in 1991.

== History and architectural features ==
Built in 1938, this historic structure is an "I"-plan, brick building that was designed in the Moderne style. It consists of a two-story front section, two-story drill hall, and a one-story rear section. The front section is seven bays wide, with the center five bays slightly projecting. During World War II, it was used to house German prisoners of war.

=== Present day ===
As of 2014, this building was owned by La Salle University. The building was sold in 2021 and demolished in 2022 to make way for a self-storage facility.
