= Emlen T. Littell =

American architect (1838–1891)

Emien T. Littell
- Born: Emien Trenchard Littell; February 12, 1838; Philadelphia, Pennsylvania, U.S.
- Died: March 4, 1891 (aged 53); New York City, New York, U.S.
- Education: University of Pennsylvania
- Occupation: Architect
- Buildings: Church of the Incarnation

Emlen Trenchard Littell (February 12, 1838 – March 4, 1891) was an American architect known for designing Gothic Revival style churches.

== Early life and education ==
Littell was born in Philadelphia, Pennsylvania. He was the son of Mary Graff Emien and Dr. Squire L. Littelll.

He attended the University of Pennsylvania, graduating with a B.A. in 1846 and an M.A. in 1859. While there, he was a member of the Fraternity of Delta Psi (aka St. Anthony Hall).

== Career ==
Littell moved to New York City where he established an architectural practice of Congdon and Littell with Columbia University graduate Henry Martyn. Congdon in 1859. They advertised that they were successors to John W. Priest, a founding member of the American Institute of Architects who died in 1859; Congdon had previously served as Priest's assistant. Their office was located at 335 Broadway. They offered designs and working drawings for churches, church furniture, cottages, parsonages, monuments, schools, stained glass, and country and farm houses. Although both architects became noted for designing churches, their partnership only lasted through 1860, with Littell establishing an independent practice in 1861.

After the Civil War, Charles Coolidge Haight worked with Littell to receive training and experience, before leaving to start his successful practice in 1867. In 1867, he formed a practice with Henry Hobson Richardson in the Trinity Building at 111 Broadway in Manhattan. However, Richardson left after a few months to form another partnership. Littell remained in the same office.

By 1884, his office was at 48 Exchange Place in New York City. There, he had a partnership, Littell & Smith, with Douglas Smyth from around 1884 to 1886.

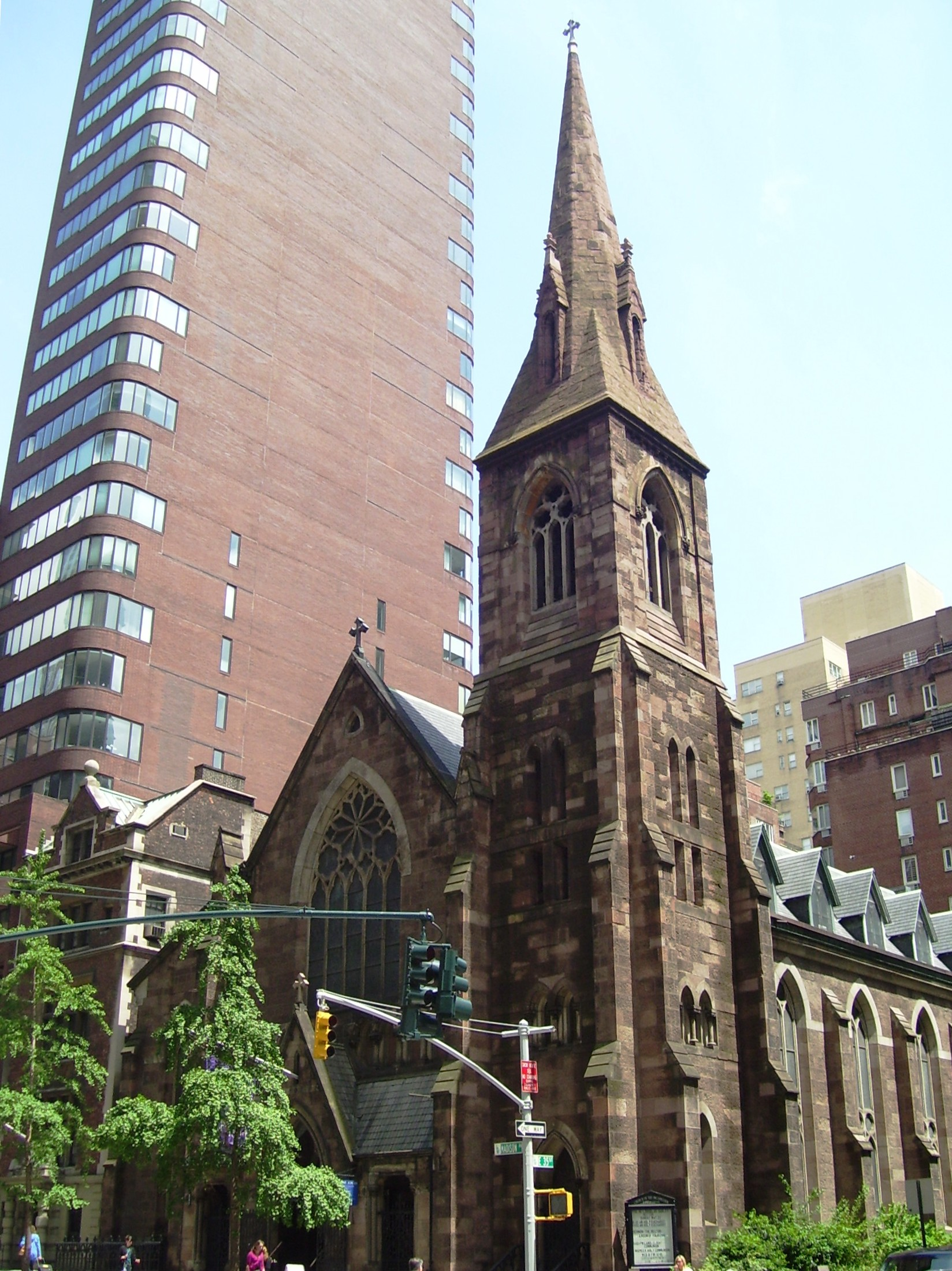
Church of the Incarnation, Manhattan, New York

=== Churches ===
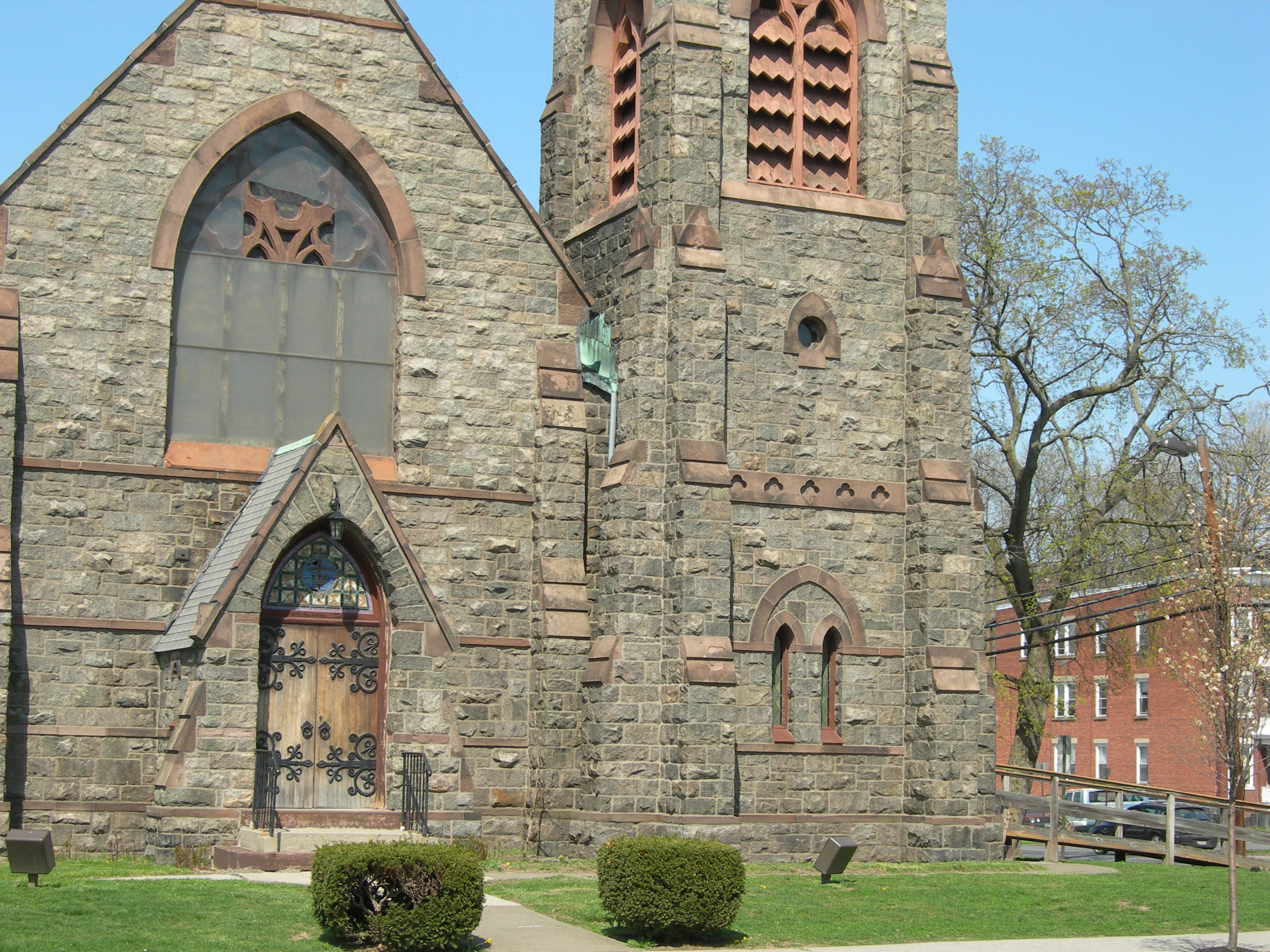
St. Paul's Episcopal Church, Poughkeepsie, New York

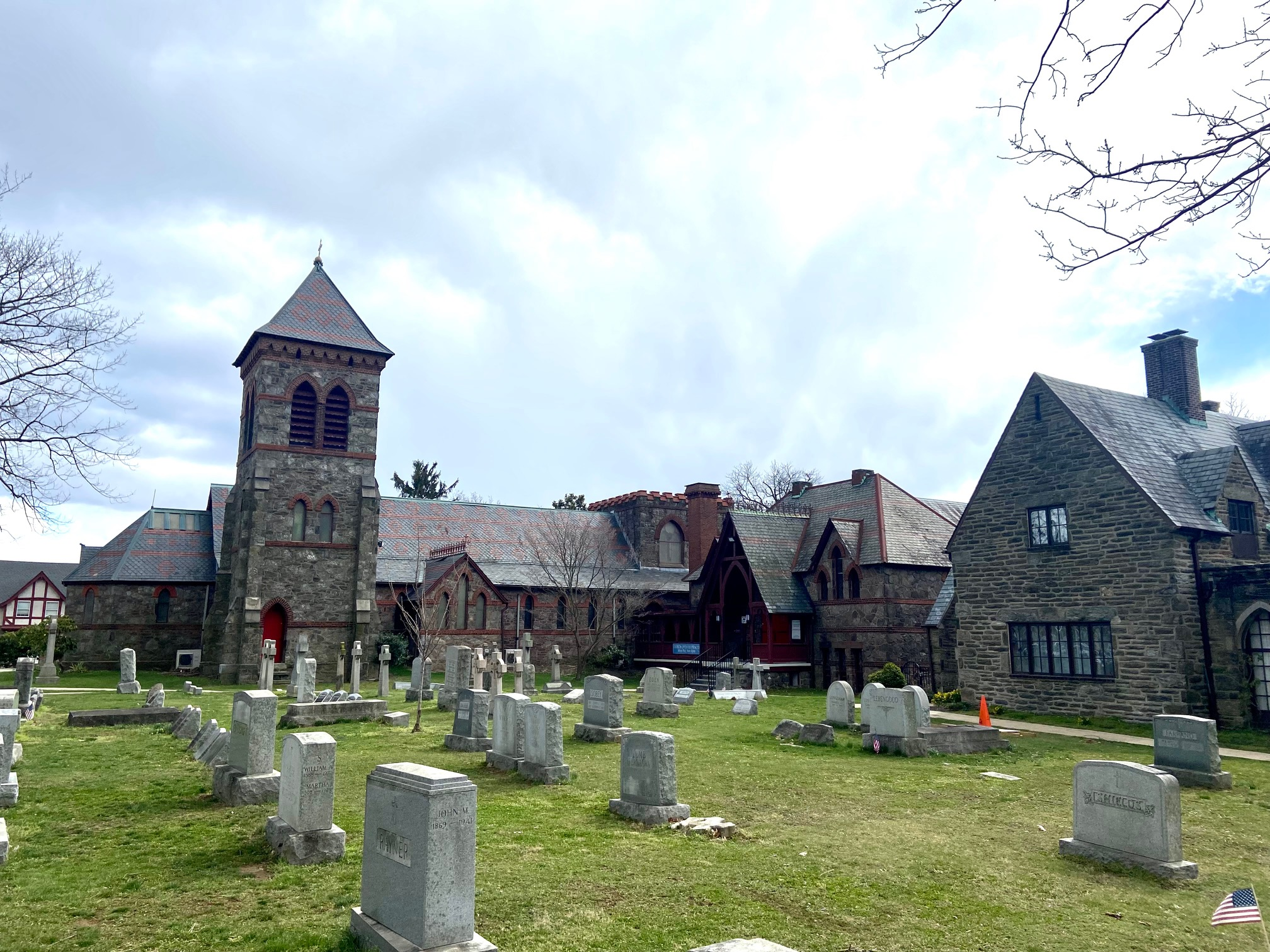
St Timothy's Church, Roxborough, Pennsylvania

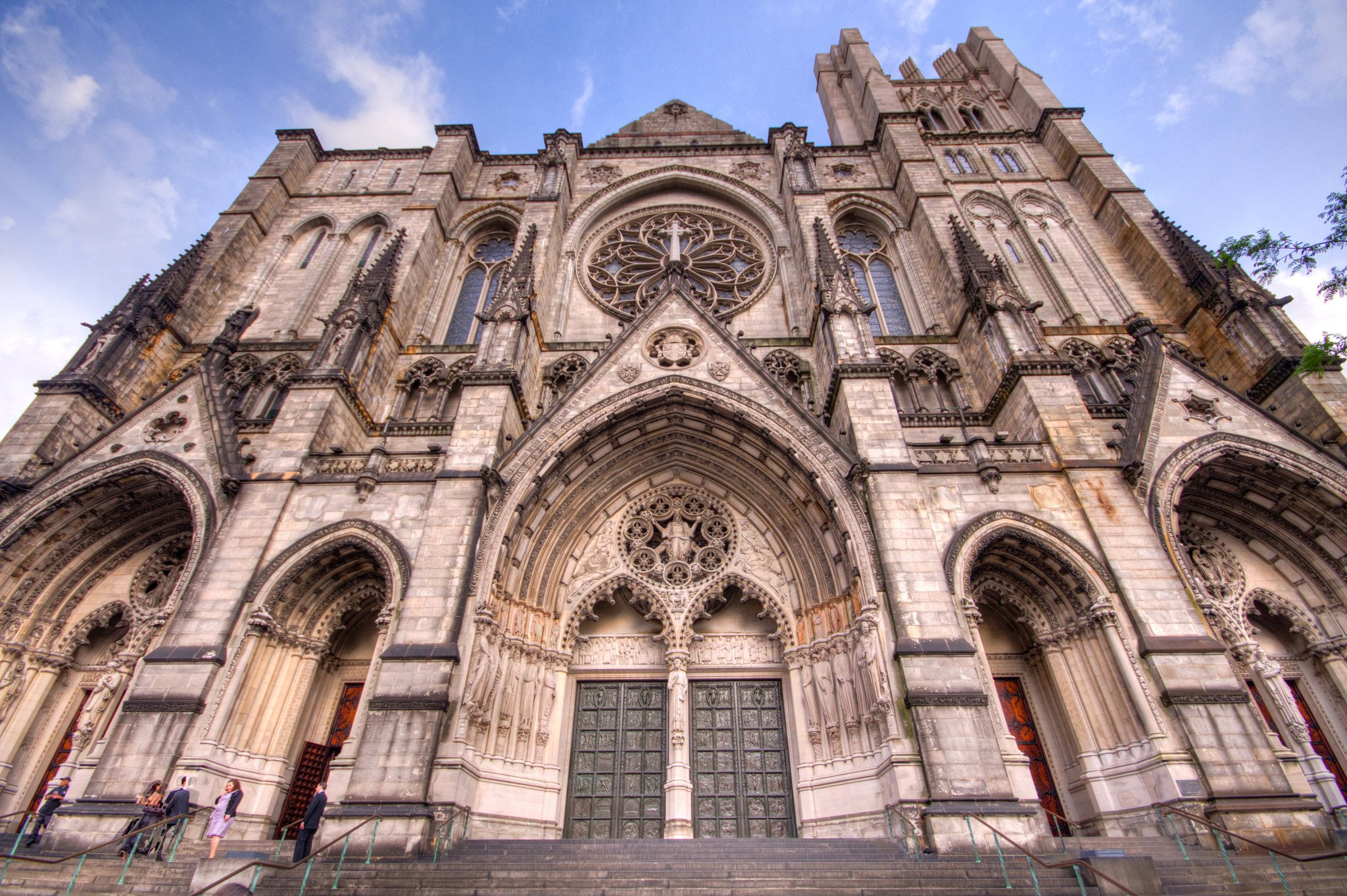
Cathedral Church of St. John in Wilmington, Delaware

Littell specialized in church designs in a style characterized as parish Gothic: nave plan, chancel, pointed windows, and other Gothic elements. He was so enamored with this style that he said, "It is hardly to be presumed that in the selection of the true style to form a basis for our church architecture many will seriously maintain that we have a choice other than English Gothic."

At the Fourth Church Conference in New York City on October 30, 1877, he presented a paper "The Church Architecture that We Need." During his presentation, he noted, "The building should declare its nature at first sight, not only showing that it is intended for a place of worship, it should distinctly impress upon the minds of beholders that it is a church, belonging to the lineage of the Anglican Church, and could by no possibility have been designed for any other use. …And it should be a landmark, so set and built that even in the midst of a crowded city it cannot be passed by unwittingly. In the city or undulating country, the lofty spires should mark its location, breaking the skyline with their sharp, cross-surmounted peaks."

He also noted that church architecture must be symbolic and truthful with no imitation or cheap materials. Comfort was also important for both physical and practical reasons; he said, "The uneasiness of the body necessarily distracts the mind from worship, and every ancient or modern appliance which provides fresh air, full light, gentle heat, et cetera, should be faithfully used to the end that the congregation shall not undergo unwilling penance. Then, as a natural sequence of true comfort, our churches will be healthful, and hereafter darkness, dampness, and foul air will not depress the vital powers and sow the seeds of disease."

In New York City, his work includes the Church of the Incarnation in Manhattan, the St. John the Baptist House on 17th Street, and the rectory of the Zion Church on Madison Avenue. The Church of the Incarnation is "a significant example of Gothic Revival architecture". It was featured in the 42nd annual exhibition of the Pennsylvania Academy of the Fine Arts in 1865. The Zion Church rectory was also a Gothic Revival structure that feature blocks of bluestone that were eighteen by twenty inches, bay windows decorated with brown stone, and porch shafts of Nova Scotia stone.

In New York state, he designed St. Paul's Episcopal Church in Poughkeepsie, St. John's Episcopal Church in Canandaigua, and Zion Episcopal Church in Palmyra. In 1870, he also designed St. John's Protestant Episcopal Church in Ogdensburg, New York. Planned as a Gothic style cathedral for a northern diocese, St. John's featured local dark-blue sandstone with trim of light-buff Ohio freestone, Tiffany stained glass windows, and a roof of red, purple, and green Vermont slate. The 150 by 75 feet (46 by 23 m) church had a canopied entrance, chancel, nave, organ chamber, sacristy, and 110 feet (34 m) tall tower connected to an open stone parapet. It also had eight bays, separated by lancet windows and buttresses. At the time, it was "the finest and costliest in the northern part of the State."

In Philadelphia, he designed the Church of St. James and its school building, the House of Prayer Episcopal Church, St. Stephen's Episcopal Church Manayunk, and St. Timothy's Episcopal Church, Roxborough. The latter project was in association with Philadelphia architect Charles Marquedent Burns who served as the decorator. Littell designed St. Timothy's to look like "a handsome country parish church within a walled churchyard." In 1863, Littell designed St. James' Memorial Church in Titusville in Crawford County, Pennsylvania. He donated his work as a contribution to the memorial fund.

He also designed the parish house and Sunday school building for the Cathedral Church of St. John in Wilmington, Delaware. His 1875 Christ Episcopal Church in Blacksburg, Virginia was the first church in the United States "to reject the simple nave plan in favor of a side entry, chancel, and pointed windows." In 1880, he designed a memorial tower and spire to add to St. John's Episcopal Church in Hagerstown, Maryland.

=== Residential ===
In April 1880, Littell designed an apartment building and four houses for 54th Street, between 6th and 7th Avenue in New York City. This $60,000 project incorporated brick, stone, and terra cotta. In February 1884, he renovated numerous residences for John S. Davidson at 16, 18, and 20 Stone Street and 33 and 35 Bridge Street in New York City, adding two-story and four-story brick extensions with gravel roofs for a cost of $30,000.

=== Commercial ===
In May 1881, he designed a three-story brick stable at 41st Street in New York for Francis H. Weeks. The $35,000 stable project also included a tennis court. His other commercial projects include the Jefferson Market in New York City. In 1887, he designed a frame building for South Mexican Telegraph Company in Guatemala.

=== Government ===
Littell designed the Battle of Monmouth Monument for Freehold, New Jersey, with New Yorkers Douglas Smythe and sculptor James E. Kelly. Construction of this ninety-foot tall monument started at the 100 anniversary of the battle on June 28, 1878, but construction would continue for six years, with its dedication on November 13, 1884. The monument cost $40,000—provided by the United States government and the State of New Jersey. The granite and bronze monument is topped by a statue called both "Columbia Triumphant" and "Liberty Triumphant", along with five bas-relief sculptures depicting scenes from the battle along the base.

== Professional affiliations ==
In 1859, he was elected as a member of the Academy of Natural Sciences of Philadelphia.

May 1, 1860, Littell was elected a Fellow of the American Institute of Architects (AIA). He served as secretary of AIA in 1862 and 1863, served on the committee on education, and was also an ex officio vice president of AIA following his service as chapter president. In 1876, he presented the paper, "Club Chambers and Apartment Houses" at the eight annual convention of AIA. His presentation was on "The Use and Abuse of Brick in Decoration" at the twelfth annual AIA convention on November 13, 1878.

He was also a founding member of the New York Chapter of AIA in 1867 and served as the group's president for three terms, from 1879 to 1884 and from 1890 to his death in 1891. He donated books to the group's library, including a complete set of Canina. In 1889, he served on a chapter committee to select and purchase plaster reproductions of architectural details and works for the Metropolitan Museum, such as a model of the Parthenon.

The American Association of Architects appointed Littell to serve on the Willard Architectural Commission, helping to select architectural items for the collection at the Metropolitan Museum of Art. Other members of the commission were Napoleon Le Brun and Alfred J. Bloor. New Yorker Levi Hale Willard left a bequest of $100,000 to the museum in 1893 to purchase "a collection of models, casts, photographs, engravings, and other objects illustrative of the art and science of architecture."

== Personal life ==
Littell married but did not have any children. In 1891. Although he lived in New York City, he spent summers in Narragansett, Rhode Island. He was a member of the University Club of New York.

Littell died at his home at 40 East 44th Street in New York City at the age of 53. His funeral service was held at the Church of the Annunciation in New York. He was buried at the Church of St. James the Less in Philadelphia.

== Select projects ==
Date	Building	Location	Status	Ref
1884	Battle of Monmouth Monument	Freehold, New Jersey		
1885	Cathedral Church of St. John parish house	10 Concord Avenue, Wilmington, Delaware	church closed in 2012	
1886	Cathedral Church of St. John Sunday school building	10 Concord Avenue, Wilmington, Delaware	church closed in 2012	
1874	Christ Episcopal Church	120 Church Street N.E., Blacksburg, Virginia		
	Church of St. James	Philadelphia, Pennsylvania		
	Church of St. James school building	Philadelphia, Pennsylvania		
1864	Church of the Incarnation	205 & 209 Madison Avenue, Manhattan, New York	NYC Individual Landmark, National Register Historic Places	
1875	Christ Episcopal Church	Blacksburg, Virginia		
1863	House of Prayer Episcopal Church	Philadelphia, Pennsylvania		
	Jefferson Market and Court House	New York City, New York		
	Lawn-Tennis Building	New York City, New York		
1871	St. James Church and School	Philadelphia, Pennsylvania	demolished	
1863	St. James Memorial Church	Titusville, Pennsylvania		
1877	St. John the Baptist House and Novitiate	231-233 East 17th Street, Manhattan, New York	now condominiums	
1872	St. John's Episcopal Church	Canandaigua, New York		
1880	St. John's Episcopal Church memorial tower and spire	Hagerstown, Maryland		
1870	St. John's Protestant Episcopal Church	Ogdensburg, New York		
1871	St. John's Protestant Episcopal ChurchSchool	Ogdensburg, New York		
	St. Paul's Church	Englewood, New Jersey		
1873	St. Paul's Episcopal Church	Poughkeepsie, New York	National Register of Historic Places	
1881	St. Stephen's Episcopal Church	Terrace Street, Manayunk, Philadelphia, Pennsylvania		
1863	St. Timothy's Episcopal Church	5720 Ridge Avenue, Roxborough, Philadelphia, Pennsylvania		
1876	St. Timothy's Episcopal Church parish building and naive expanded, clerestory tower	5720 Ridge Avenue, Roxborough, Philadelphia, Pennsylvania		
1876	Zion Church Rectory	Madison Avenue		
1872	Zion Episcopal Church	Palmyra, New York	Palmyra Village Historic District, National Register of Historic Places	
