= St. David's Church, Manayunk =

Episcopal church in Manayunk, Pennsylvania, United States

St. David's Church
- St. David's Episcopal Church
- Location within Pennsylvania Location within the United States
- 40.02906126494426°N 75.22667666018597°W
- Location: 150 Dupont Street; Philadelphia, Pennsylvania 19127
- Country: United States
- Denomination: Episcopal
- Website: www.stdavidsmanayunk.org

History
- Founded: December 8, 1831
- Dedication: Saint David of Wales
- Consecrated: December 26, 1881

Architecture
- Architect: James Stafford
- Years built: 1880-1881

St. David's Episcopal Church is a parish of the Episcopal Diocese of Pennsylvania in the Manayunk neighborhood of Philadelphia, Pennsylvania. It is part of the Wissahickon Deanery of the Diocese of Pennsylvania. English-born mill-workers were heavily represented in its early population, while mill owners were successive wardens, vestrymen, and treasurers.

In 1960, the parish reported 621 members; it reported 16 members in 2025. In 2025, the parish reported average Sunday attendance (ASA) of 13 and plate and pledge financial income of $16,033.

The first church building designed by architect John Notman was completed in 1835 and destroyed by fire on December 23, 1879. The first rector was the Rev. Frederick Freeman, who served from 1835 to 1839. The current brownstone building was consecrated on December 26, 1881 by Bishop William Bacon Stevens after the laying of its cornerstone by the same bishop on May 15, 1880. It was inscribed on the Philadelphia Register of Historic Places on March 8, 2019.

The sanctuary is designed for ad orientem liturgical celebration, which has been practiced occasionally since the 1970s. The high altar was designed by the studio of English Gothic revival architect George Frederick Bodley and completed by the firm of Cram and Ferguson Architects. It was dedicated and blessed on October 31, 1919 by Bishop Philip M. Rhinelander in memory of Orlando Crease, warden of the parish for 56 years and Sunday school superintendent from 1853 to 1913.

In 1886, the church installed a four-face tower clock by the E. Howard Watch and Clock Company with six-foot diameter faces striking on an E-flat bell and weighing 2,500 pounds. The clock-face is a popular Manayunk landmark and was the object of a 2007 restoration campaign.

The parish had a separate chapel on Terrace Street in Manayunk until 1886. By 1889, St. David's had a surpliced male choir, indicating a somewhat High Church worship orientation. In 1919, the church abandoned pew-rents.

St. David's was instrumental in the founding of at least three local daughter parishes through its Sunday schools: Church of St. Alban, Roxborough, St. Timothy's Episcopal Church, Roxborough, and the former St. Stephen's, Wissahickon (demolished 1975).

== Notable people ==
- Benjamin Wistar Morris, second Bishop of the Episcopal Diocese of Oregon, rector 1850-1856
- Walter C. Righter (1923-2011), baptized and raised at St. David's. Bishop of the Episcopal Diocese of Iowa (1972-1988), assistant bishop for the Episcopal Diocese of Newark from 1989 to 1991. Righter was formally charged with heresy in 1995 for ordaining a non-celibate gay man to the diaconate, and acquitted on May 15, 1996 after an ecclesiastical trial.

== See also ==
- Church of St. Alban, Roxborough
- St. Timothy's Episcopal Church, Roxborough
- St. Peter's Episcopal Church of Germantown
