= Suffolk Manor Apartments =

- U.S. National Register of Historic Places
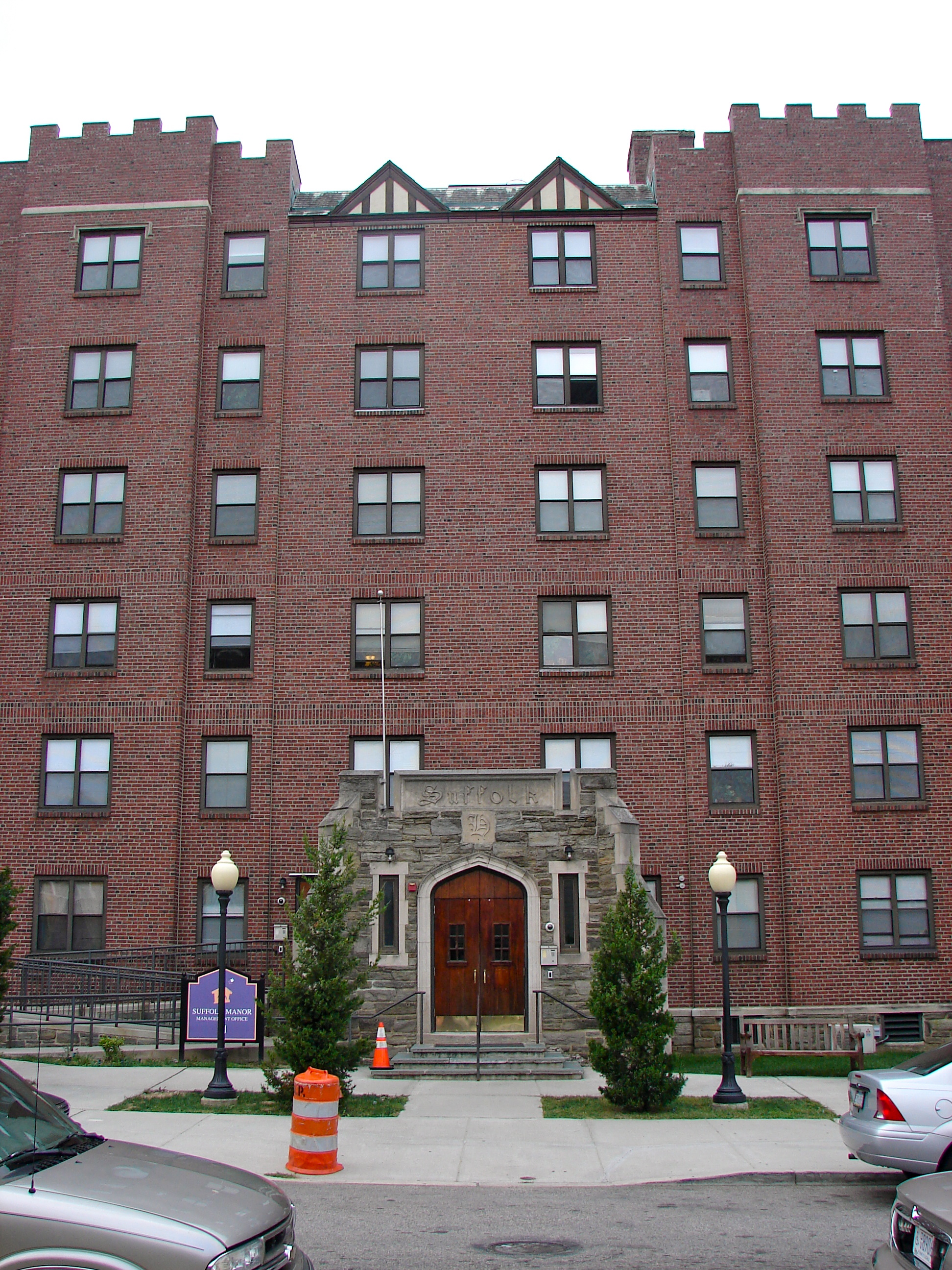
- Suffolk Manor Apartments, September 2010

- Location within Philadelphia Location within Pennsylvania Location within the United States
- Location: 1414-1450 Clearview St., Philadelphia, Pennsylvania
- Coordinates: 40°2′24″N 75°8′43″W
- Area: less than one acre
- Built: 1930
- Architectural style: Tudor Revival
- NRHP reference No.: 02001567
- Added to NRHP: December 20, 2002

The Suffolk Manor Apartments is an historic apartment building in the Ogontz neighborhood of Philadelphia, Pennsylvania, United States.

It was added to the National Register of Historic Places in 2002.

== History and architectural features ==
This historic structure is a six-story, 138-unit, steel frame and brick building that sits on a stone foundation. Built in 1930 in the Tudor Revival style, it was created in an "H"-plan form with five sections, 84 feet, 6 inches, deep, and 328, 8 inches, wide. It features a crenelated parapet, half timbering with stucco infill, stone buttressing, and a main entrance with heavy oak double doors in an Elizabethan arch.
