= Heaton, Butler and Bayne =

English firm that produced stained-glass windows

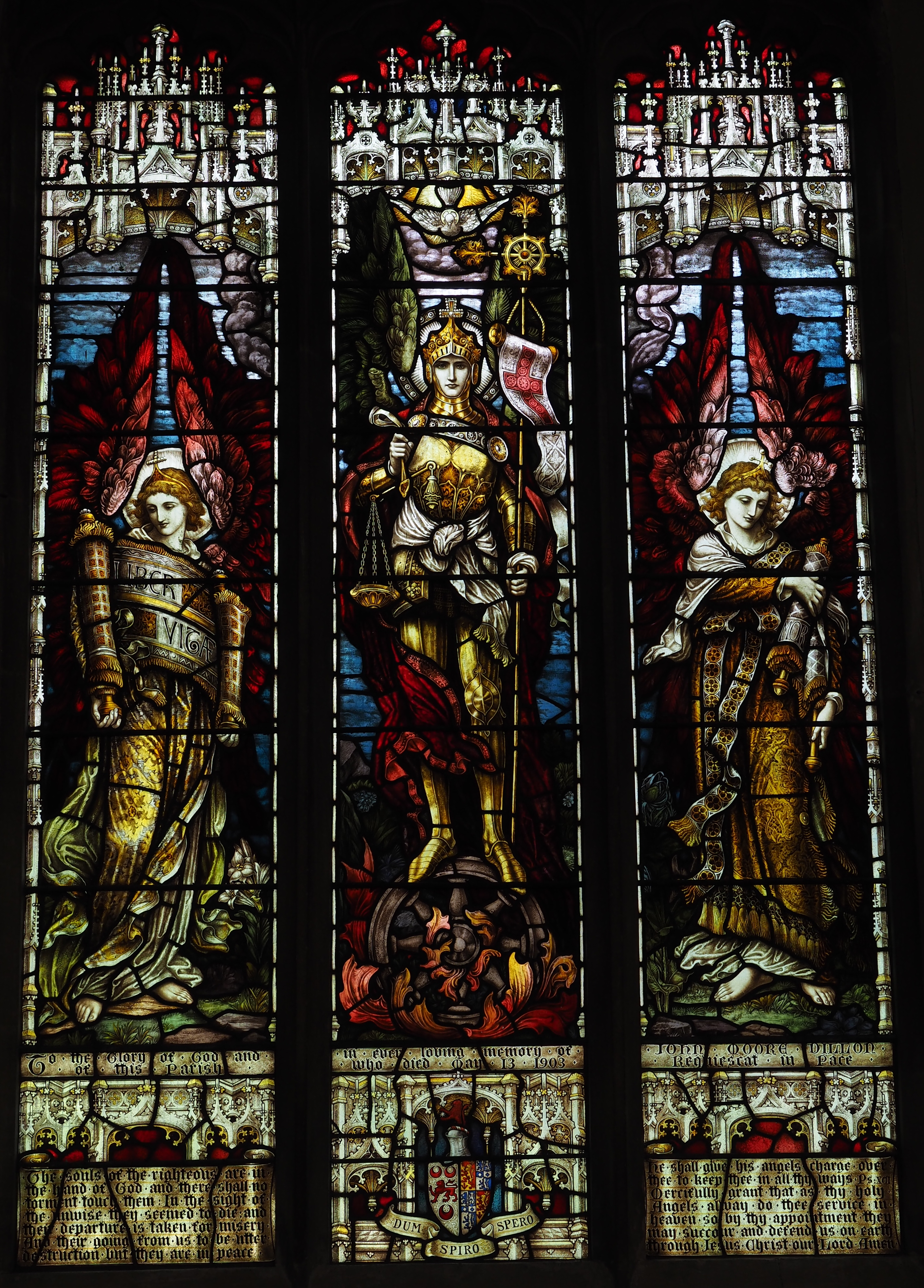
Church of St Mary the Virgin, Widdington, Essex

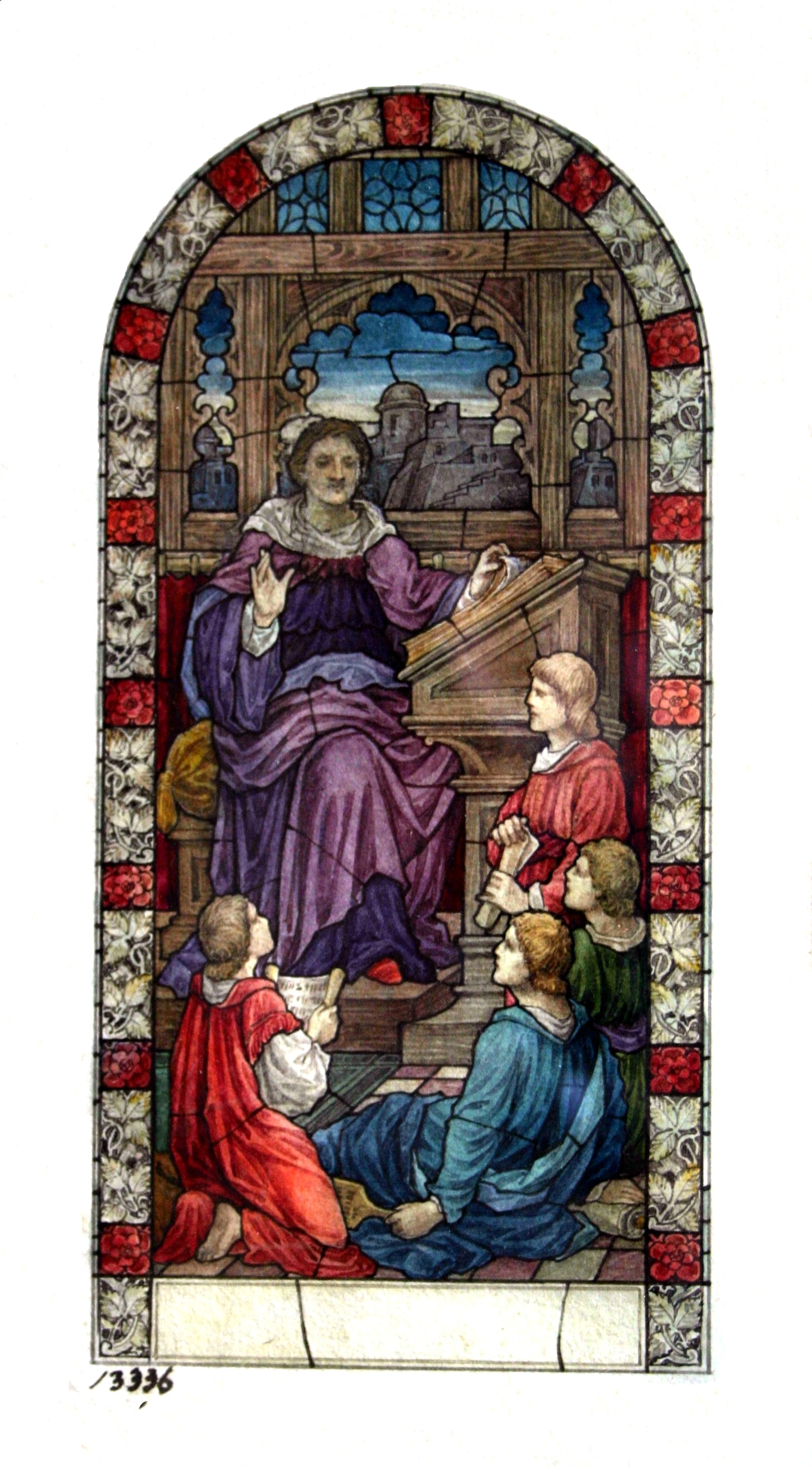
A maquette by Heaton, Butler and Bayne.

Heaton, Butler and Bayne was a British firm that produced stained-glass windows from 1862 to 1953.

== History ==
Clement Heaton (1824–1882) founded his own stained glass firm in 1852, joined by James Butler (1830–1913) in 1855. Between 1859 and 1861 they worked alongside Clayton and Bell and were joined by Robert Turnill Bayne (1837–1915), who became their sole designer and a full partner in the firm in 1862. The firm was known as Heaton, Butler and Bayne from 1862.

His windows show strong design and colour, and are often recognisable by the inclusion of at least one figure with Bayne's features and long beard. They established their studio in Covent Garden, London, and went on to become one of the leading firms of Gothic Revival stained glass manufacturers, whose work was commissioned by the principal Victorian architects. A change in direction came with their production of windows to the designs of Henry Holiday in 1868, which show a more classical influence at work. During a long career, the firm produced stained glass for numerous churches throughout the Britain and the Empire, as well as the United States.

Westminster Abbey includes a Heaton, Butler and Bayne window, installed in 1868, an early example of the work of Henry Holiday. Also the stained glass in the east window of the Parish Church of St Mary Magdalene, Gillingham. Other windows by this firm are in Wimborne Minster 1857, Peterborough Cathedral 1864 and St Mary's Parish Church, Hampton c1888. A documentary film, Stained Glass Masters: Heaton, Butler and Bayne, was produced in 2000 by the film maker Karl Krogstad. The documentary was narrated by Edgar Award winning author Burl Barer.

== Selected works ==
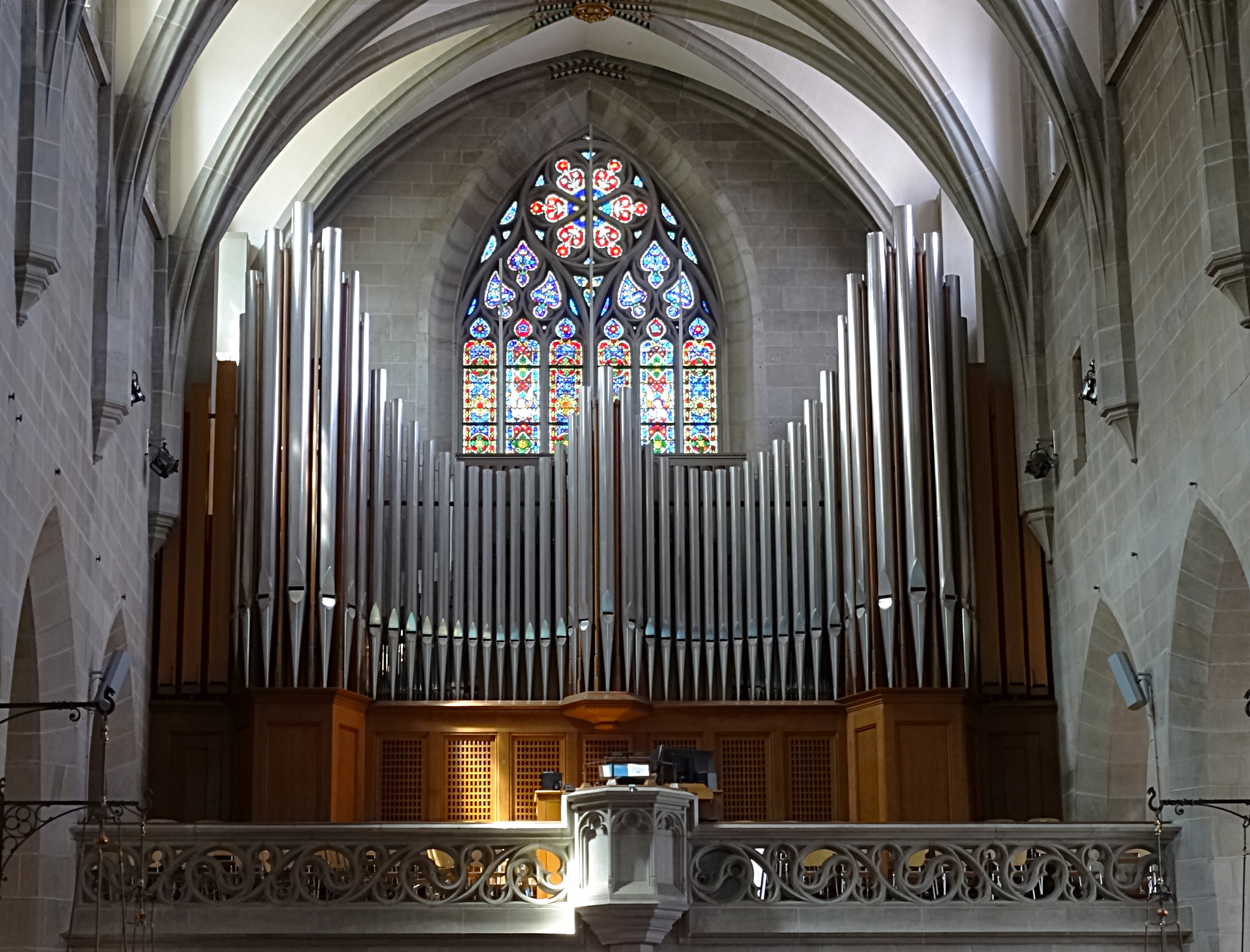
Heaton-window at Fraumünster Zürich

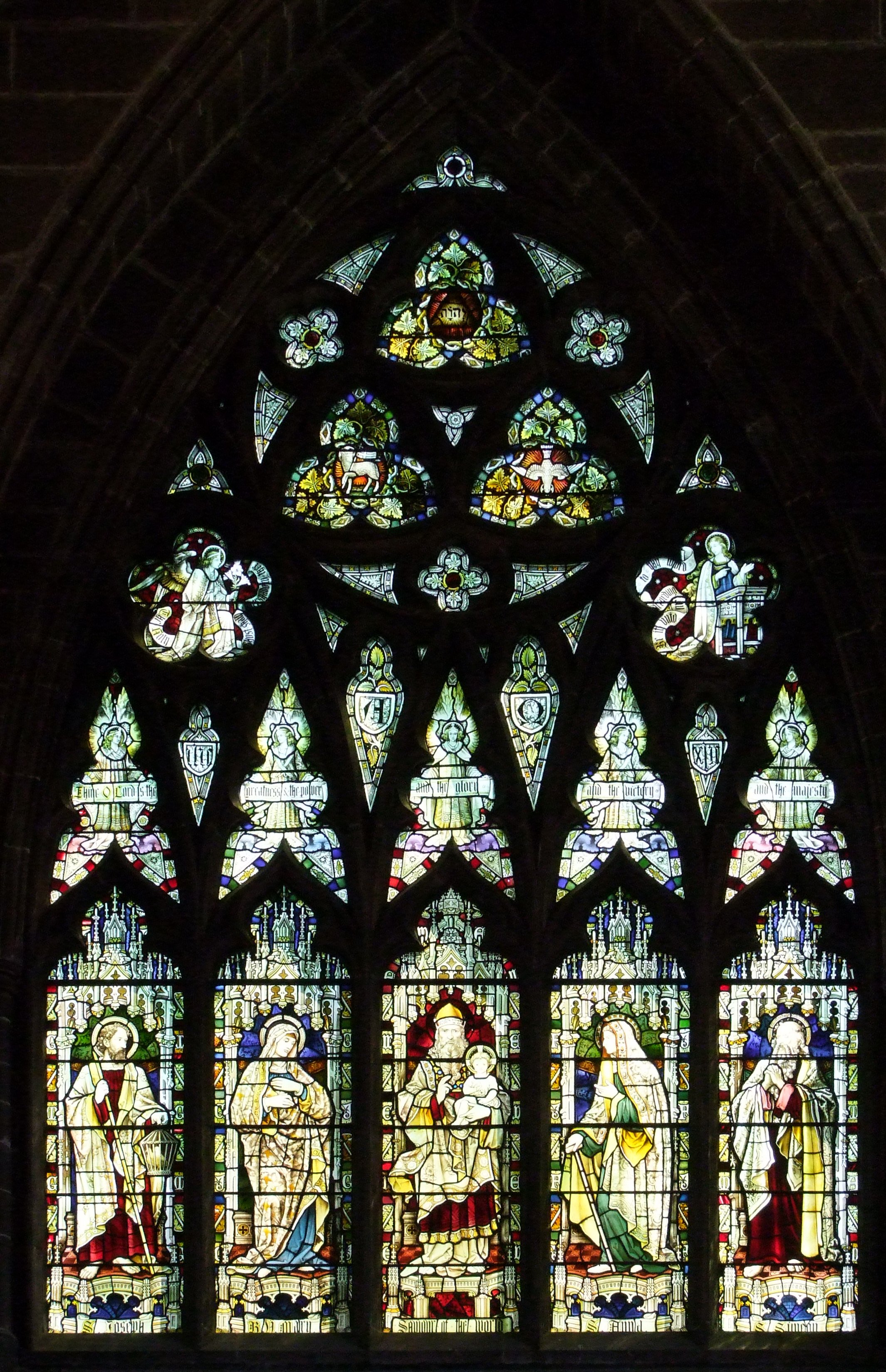
The east window of Chester Cathedral

England

- St Mary's Church, Banbury
- Tewkesbury Abbey, Tewkesbury, Gloucestershire (Adoration of the Magi, 1869)
- St. Lawrence's Church, St Lawrence, Isle of Wight (Parable of the Sower)
- Church of St. Mary the Virgin, Staverton, Northamptonshire (Faith, Hope, and Charity, 1896)
- All Saints' Church, Brandon Parva, Norfolk
- St. Peter's Church, Dunton, Norfolk
- St. Mary's Church, East Carleton, Norfolk (Saint Mary and Jesus Christ)
- St. Michael's Church, Ingoldisthorpe, Norfolk (works of mercy)
- All Saints' Church, Intwood, Norfolk
- St. James' Church, Hebden Bridge, West Yorkshire
- St Mary's Church, Osterley
- St Denys Church, Southampton

Wales

- Drybridge House, Monmouth, Monmouthshire (Memorial Window to C. H. Crompton-Roberts, 1894)
- Church of St. Nicholas, Trellech, Monmouthshire

Scotland

- Govan Old Parish Church, Govan, Glasgow

Northern Ireland

- St. Eugene's Church, Newtownstewart, County Tyrone (Memorial to Rev. James McIvor, 1909)

Canada

- Cathedral of the Holy Trinity, Quebec City, Quebec

France

- Royal Memorial Church of St George, Cannes, Alpes-Maritimes

Russia

- Church of the Savior on Blood, Saint Petersburg

Switzerland

- Fraumunster, Zurich, Canton of Zurich

United States

- St. Saviour's Church, Bar Harbor, Maine
- Calvary Episcopal Church, Pittsburgh, Pennsylvania
- St. Alban's Church, Philadelphia, Pennsylvania
- St. Mark's Episcopal Church, Evanston, Illinois
- St. Matthew's Cathedral, Laramie, Wyoming

== See also ==
- Stained glass - British glass, 1811-1918
