= St. Alban's Church, Olney =

Church in Olney, Pennsylvania, United States

Church of St. Alban the Martyr
- St. Alban's Church
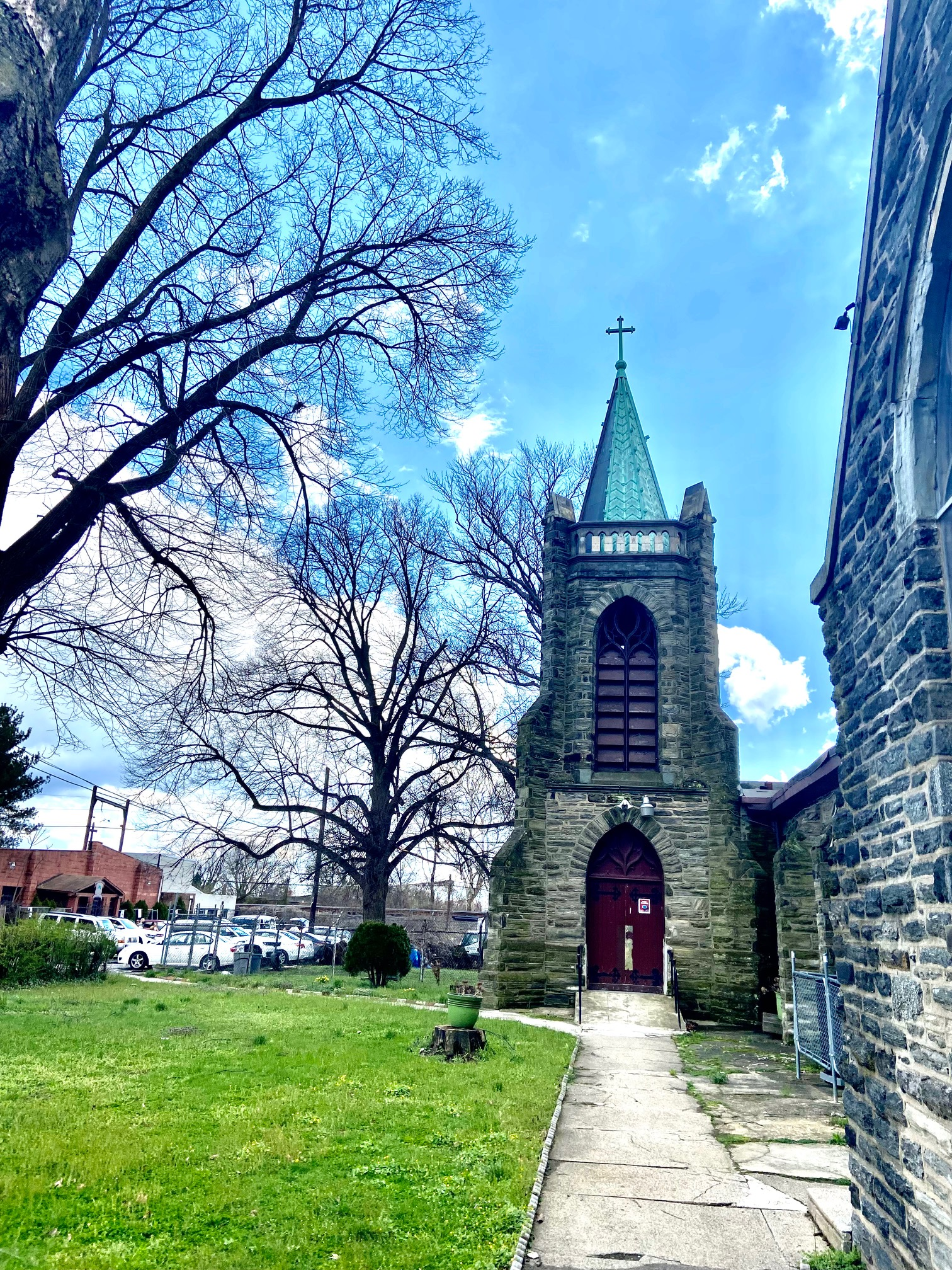

- Location within Pennsylvania Location within the United States
- 40.0329302852004°N 75.12638290556005°W
- Location: 200 West Tabor Road; Philadelphia, Pennsylvania 19120
- Country: United States
- Denomination: Episcopal Church

History
- Founded: 1891
- Dedication: St. Alban the Protomartyr of England
- Consecrated: June 20, 1915

Architecture
- Architect: George T. Pearson (1849-1920)
- Years built: 1915-1921
- Groundbreaking: January 24, 1915
- Completed: 1921

St. Alban's Church, Olney was a church of the Episcopal Diocese of Pennsylvania in the Olney section of North Philadelphia. Through the ministry and influence of its most significant rector, Archibald Campbell Knowles (1865-1961), St. Alban's was considered a major Anglo-Catholic parish of the American Protestant Episcopal Church. The building is inscribed as landmark No. 56 of the Philadelphia Historical Commission. The cornerstone for the congregation's second building was laid on January 24, 1915, and it was consecrated on June 20, 1915 by Bishop Reginald Heber Weller of the Episcopal Diocese of Fond du Lac. Its architect was George T. Pearson in the Philadelphia firm of Sloan & Hutton; his other work includes St. Luke's, Germantown, Market Square Presbyterian Church in Germantown (dissolved 1995), buildings at the Philadelphia Cricket Club, college buildings throughout the United States, and several railroad stations and hotels in Virginia.

St. Alban's was founded in 1891 as a mission of St. Luke's Church, Germantown under the Rev. Samuel Upjohn, rector. Its vicar from 1898 and rector from 1907 to 1951 was A.C. Knowles. The parish organized formally on April 27, 1906 and petitioned to be received in union with the diocesan convention. A substantial group of mission congregants protested Knowles' election as rector in 1906 "because we are informed and so believe that the sole purpose thereof is to [...] fasten upon said church his absolute rule in spiritual and temporal matters and his extreme ritualistic mode of worship."

In 1910, 1916, 1921, 1924, and 1951 it approved bylaws binding it to the following principles, and dissolving its ability to receive Knowles family trust funds if any particulars were altered:

- the Doctrine, Discipline and Worship of the One Holy, Catholic and Apostolic Church, of which the Anglican Communion is a true part, especially teaching the Divine Institution of the Church, the Sacred Character of the Ministry, the Solemn Obligation of the Creed, the Holy Inspiration of the Scriptures, the Grace and Efficacy of the Sacraments, the Real Presence of Christ in the Sacrament of the Altar and the Practices of Fasting Communion, Sacramental Confession or Penance, and Eucharistic Worship with the accompaniment of Ancient and Catholic Ceremonial, including the use of Crosses, Crucifixes, Lights, Eucharistic Vestments and Incense.

Knowles did not attend seminary, but was ordained to the priesthood in 1899 by Bishop Isaac Lea Nicholson of the Episcopal Diocese of Milwaukee. He was the author of the extremely popular volume The Practice of Religion, in print continuously since its first publication in 1911. Knowles was appointed rector emeritus on his retirement in 1951, and did not receive a stipend during the 64 years of his work for the congregation. Most of the windows, altars, and furnishings of the church (itself constructed as a memorial to Knowles' parents) were in the names of his family members, or in thanksgiving for anniversaries in his ordained ministry.

St. Alban's reported 245 baptized members in 1940, 159 members in 1964, and under six members for its final nine years. The parish was formally closed by Bishop Charles E. Bennison in 2005. Its internal organization included a Sunday School, a Confraternity of Saint Alban, a Guild of Saint Mary the Virgin, an Altar Society, and wards of the Guild of All Souls and the Confraternity of the Blessed Sacrament.

The Diocese of Pennsylvania sold the building and land on September 20, 2007 for $180,000 to God's Church by the Faith of Philadelphia (Église de Dieu par la foi de Philadelphia), a Francophone Christian congregation which previously worshiped across the street.

The stained glass windows of the church are by the English firm of Heaton, Butler and Bayne, active from 1862 to 1953. The church has a bell first hung in 1898 and replaced in 1916 in memory of Joseph Alfred Jones (1840-1891).

St. Alban's, Olney is sometimes confused with other local churches, the Church of St. Alban, Roxborough and St. Alban's Church, Newtown Square. The Episcopal Diocese of Springfield, Illinois also had a parish called St. Alban's, Olney until 2012 when it was deconsecrated.

== Clergy ==
- Archibald Campell Knowles 1897-1951, emeritus 1951-1961
- James Claypoole Dorsey 1960-2005

== See also ==
- St. Alban's Episcopal Church, Newtown Square
- Church of St. Alban, Roxborough
