= St. Paul's Episcopal Church (Poughkeepsie, New York) =

Historic church in New York, United States

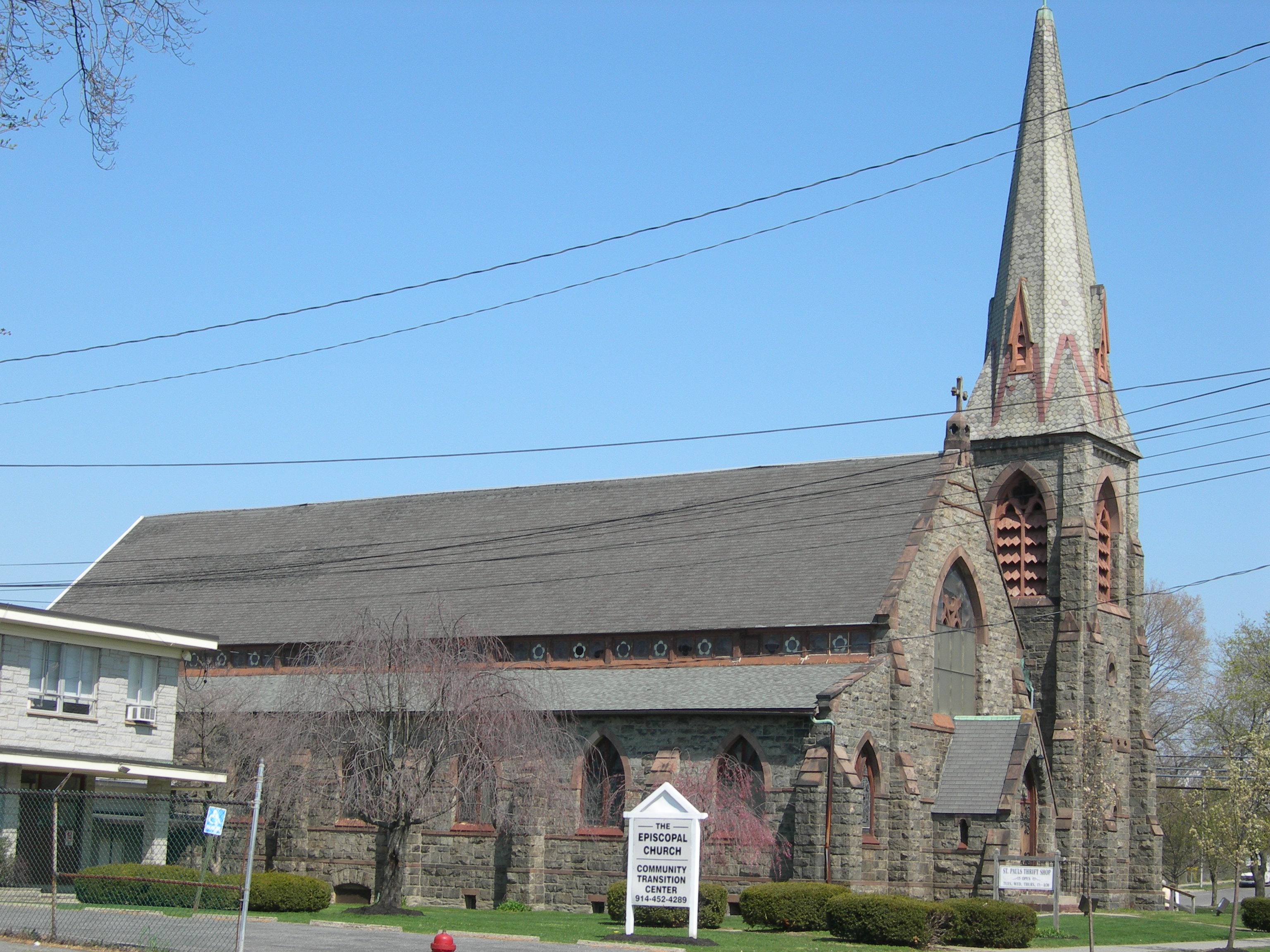
- West profile and south elevation, 2008

Religion
- Affiliation: Episcopal Church in the United States of America
- Leadership: The Rev. Tyler Jones
- Year consecrated: 1873

Location
- Location: Poughkeepsie
- Interactive map of St. Paul's Episcopal Church
- Coordinates: 41°42′24″N 73°55′20″W

Architecture
- Architect: Emlen T. Littell
- Type: church
- Style: Norman-Gothic Revival
- General contractor: William T. Harlow
- Groundbreaking: 1870-1873

Specifications
- Direction of façade: South
- Capacity: 350
- Materials: Stone

U.S. National Register of Historic Places
- Added to NRHP: 1982
- NRHP Reference no.: 82001163

Website
- St. Paul's Episcopal Church

St. Paul's Episcopal Church is located at North Hamilton and Mansion streets on the west side of Mansion Square in Poughkeepsie, New York, United States. It is a stone church in the Norman-Gothic Revival styles built in the late 19th century.

The church reported 199 members in 2019 and 169 members in 2023; no membership statistics were reported in 2024 parochial reports. Plate and pledge income reported for the congregation in 2024 was $65,292 with average Sunday attendance (ASA) of 29 persons.

Designed by New York City architect Emlen T. Littell, it has had additions and renovations by other well-known architects, such as Frederick Clarke Withers and Richard Upjohn. The interior treatment was done by Tiffany & Co. in the early 20th century. In 1982 it was added to the National Register of Historic Places.

== Building ==
The church building is a one-and-a-half-story structure, three bays wide on the south (front) facade, faced in rough-cut stone. A three-and-a-half-story high tower topped with a broach spire rises from the southeast corner. The side elevations have stained glass clerestory windows.

Heavy wooden doors hang on strap hinges inside a small projecting portico at the main entrance. Much of the original interior remains inside, including woodwork, furniture, doors and hardware.

== History ==
St. Paul's was organized by a group of local businessmen who first met in September 1835 and elected wardens and vestry. Two years later, they built a Greek Revival church, partially funded by Manhattan's Trinity Church on the site of the present one.

The Panic of 1837 and the ensuing lean economic times strained the church's finances, so it seriously considered closing in 1842. It did not, and in 1846, hired Dr. Albert Traver, a rector who pioneered in diversity and multiculturalism by accepting the job only if he could continue his work ministering to German immigrants in the Town of Clinton nearby, in rural northern Dutchess County, one Sunday a month.

By 1870 the congregation's growth had been such that they decided a bigger building was needed, and hired New York City architect Emlen Littell to design a new building. He obliged with a Norman-Gothic Revival structure to be built of native stone. William Harlow, a former mayor of the city who would later build Harlow Row downtown, was hired as the builder. It was completed and consecrated three years later. At that time it was a smaller building, lacking the current south transept, narthex and bell tower.

In 1882, Frederick Clarke Withers was hired to design a Tudor Revival church school building on adjacent property. The adjacent Parish House property was added the same year. Ten years later the south transept and gallery were added, based on designs by Richard Upjohn, who had died 14 years earlier.

During the first decade of the new century, the congregation turned its attention to the interior. In 1906 it accepted a $1,850 ($66,300 in contemporary dollars) bid from Tiffany & Co. to refurbish the sanctuary. Five years later, in 1911, this was completed, with a new lectern, pulpit, credence table and church doors added, as well as electric lighting.

The church's growth continued through the 20th century, and in 1956 a building committee considered what to do about the increasing need for more church school space. A new education building was constructed, and Withers' 1882 building was demolished in the early 1960s. Community programs, including a soup kitchen, use the new building today.

In the 1960s, the church began to lose members as congregants moved from the city out to the suburbs. A new rector, The Rev. Robert Leather, reached out to the communities that remained in the city's poorer northern neighborhoods by allowing programs like Alcoholics and Narcotics Anonymous to use the church's space, and continuing the soup kitchen, now known as the Lunch Box. A congregant established a thrift shop in the church's undercroft in 1979 to pay for maintenance of the parking lot. It continues to operate today under the name Small Blessings.

A 2003 fire slightly damaged the church. It has since been repaired.
