= Frederick Winthrop =

Union general during the American Civil War (1839–1865)

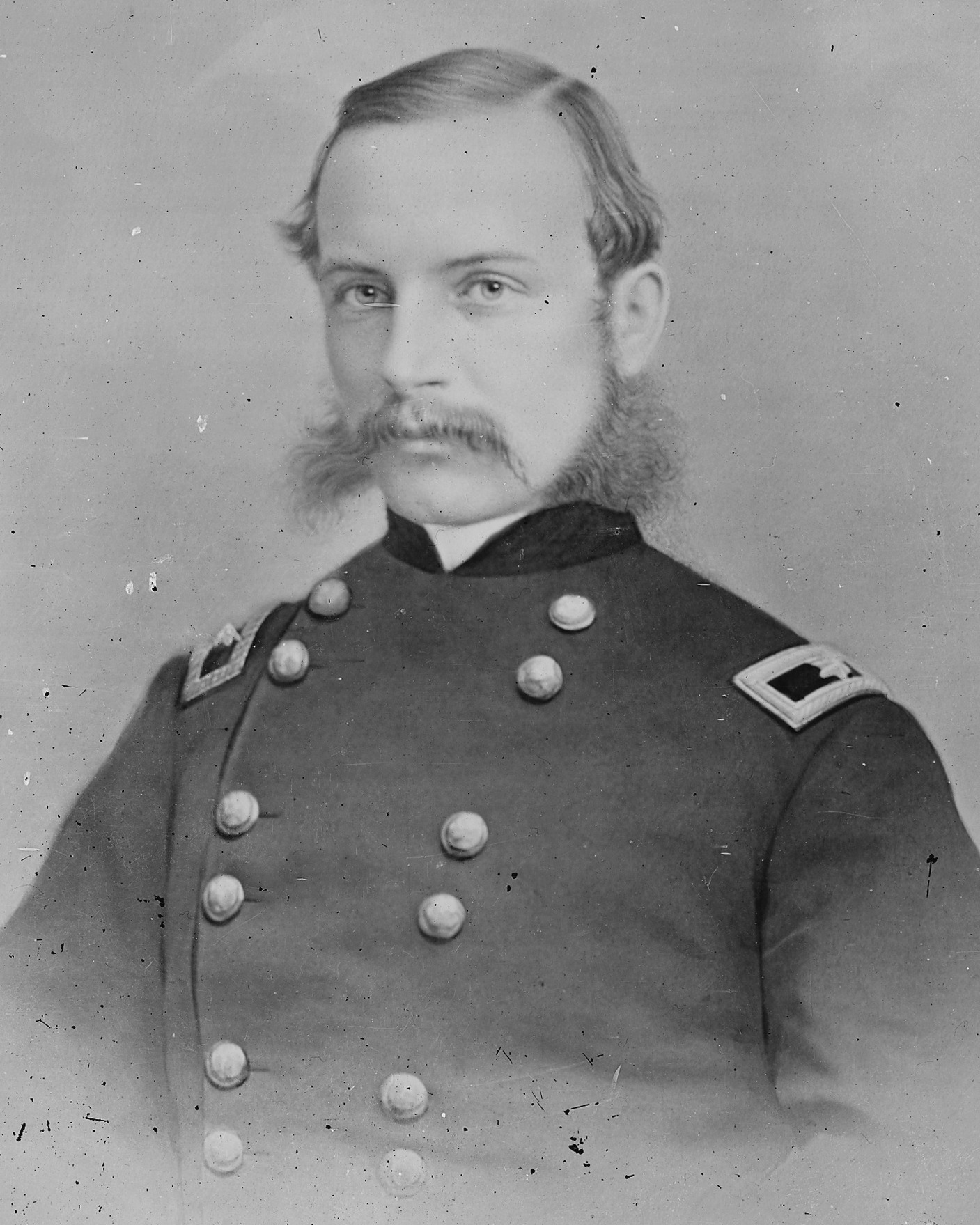
- Born: August 3, 1839; New York City, U.S.
- Died: April 1, 1865 (aged 25); Dinwiddie County, Virginia, C.S.
- Burial place: Green-Wood Cemetery
- Relatives: Robert Winthrop (brother); Beekman Winthrop (nephew)
- Military career
- Allegiance: United States
- Branch: United States Army
- Service years: 1862–1865
- Rank: Brevet brigadier general
- Conflicts: American Civil War; Battle of Five Forks †

Frederick Winthrop (August 3, 1839 – April 1, 1865) was an American Union general during the period of the American Civil War.

== Early life ==
Winthrop was born on August 3, 1839, in New York City.

He was a brother of New York City banker Robert Winthrop. His nephew Beekman Winthrop served as Governor of Puerto Rico, Assistant Secretary of the Treasury, and Assistant Secretary of the Navy.

== Military career ==
General Winthrop, an officer in the Union Army, joined the Army of the Potomac on April 11, 1862, participating in most of its famous battles. Winthrop had been a brevet brigadier general at the time of his death. Winthrop received his appointment as brevet major general dated to April 1, 1865.

== Death ==
He was killed at the Battle of Five Forks on April 1, 1865, about one week before General Robert E. Lee surrendered his army following the Battle of Appomattox Court House. He is buried in Green-Wood Cemetery in Brooklyn, New York.

== See also ==
- List of American Civil War brevet generals (Union)
