= The Peacock Skirt =

1893 illustration by Aubrey Beardsley

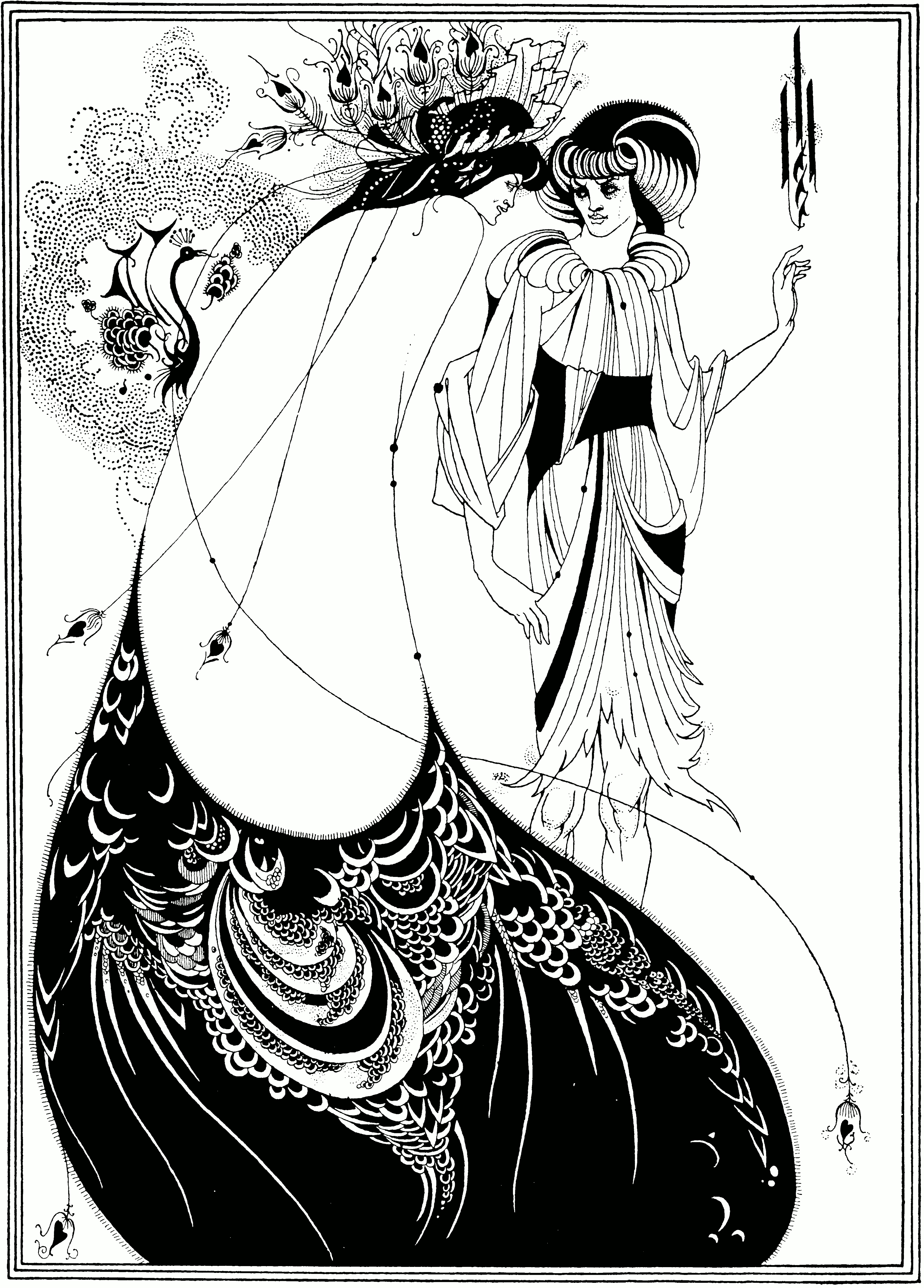
Aubrey Beardsley, The Peacock Skirt, 1893

The Peacock Skirt is an 1893 illustration by Aubrey Beardsley. His original pen and ink drawing was first reproduced as a wood engraving in the first English edition of Oscar Wilde's one-act play Salome in 1894. In later editions it was photo-mechanically reproduced as a lineblock for printing. The original drawing was bequeathed by Grenville Lindall Winthrop to the Fogg Art Museum at Harvard University in 1943.

== Background ==
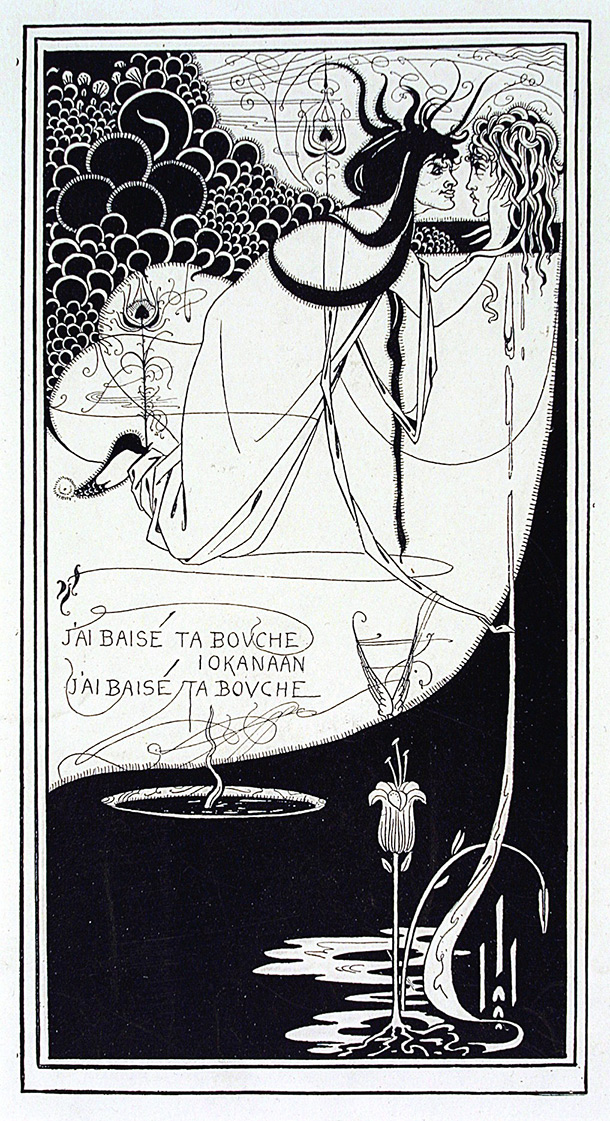
Aubrey Beardsley, J'ai baisé ta bouche, Iokanaan, illustration, The Studio, April 1893.

Wilde's one-act play Salome was originally written in French in 1891, while he was living in Paris. Performance of the play was prohibited in England, ostensibly on account of it depicting biblical characters.

The play inspired Beardsley to make an illustration, J'ai baisé ta bouche, Iokanaan ("I have kissed your mouth, Jokanaan"), which was printed with eight other drawings in an article, "A New Illustrator: Aubrey Beardsley", by Joseph Pennell in the first issue of the artistic journal The Studio in April 1893.

Wilde wrote to Beardsley, recognising him as a "kindred spirit" and enclosing a copy of Salome, and commissioned him to illustrate the first edition of the play, which was published in English in 1894.

== Description of The Peacock Skirt ==
The Peacock Skirt was the second of ten illustrative plates published with the English version of Wilde's play. It shows a rear quarter view of a woman, Salome, wearing a long robe decorated with stylised peacock feather pattern. Her headdress is also decorated with peacock feathers, and more long peacock feathers drape down over her back. The head of a peacock is visible over her left shoulder. Salome is turned to the right, to converse with a second figure, probably the "Young Syrian" mentioned in the text of the play, with an androgynous face but masculine hairy knees, elaborate hairstyle and pleated tunic.

The drawing was influenced by James McNeill Whistler's decorations in his 1876–77 Peacock Room, designed for Frederick Leyland's house at 49 Prince's Gate, but now in the Freer Gallery of Art. The refined curving lines of Beardsley's drawing were also influenced by Japanese woodblock prints, and anticipate the forms of the Art Nouveau aesthetic.

The print measures 178 by 127 millimetres (7.0 in × 5.0 in).

== Other illustrations ==
The Studio owned the copyright for the original drawing of Iokanaan, so Beardsley drew an adapted version, The Climax, which was published as an illustration for the play. Beardsley added nine other drawings, including The Peacock Skirt, to make ten plates:

- Plate 1, The Woman in the Moon
- Plate 2, The Peacock Skirt
- Plate 3, The Black Cape
- Plate 4, The Platonic Lament
- Plate 5, Enter Herodias
- Plate 6, The Eyes of Herod
- Plate 7, The Stomach Dance
- Plate 8, The Toilette of Salome
- Plate 9, The Dancer's Reward
- Plate 10, The Climax

Salome also wears a distinctive peacock headdress in plates 6 (The Eyes of Herod) and 7 (The Stomach Dance). Beardsley also drew a peacock feather design for the book's cover, and decorative borders for the title page and contents page.

== Print history ==
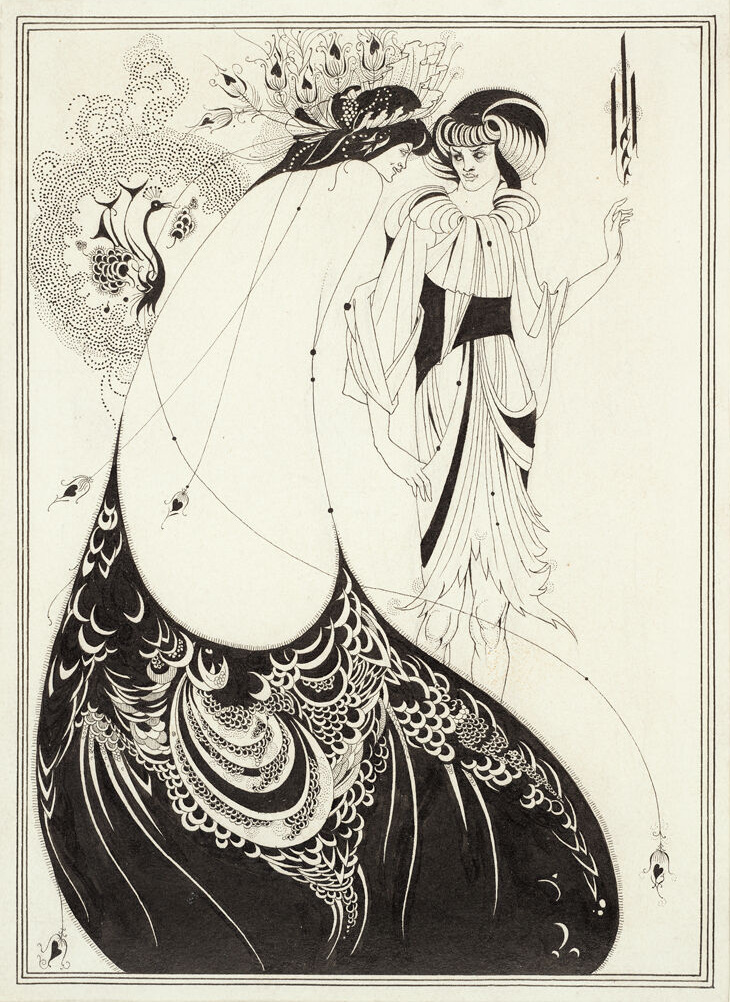
The original pen and ink drawing of The Peacock Skirt

Prints of Beardsley's drawings were included in the English edition of Salome, published in 1894 by Elkin Mathews and John Lane of The Bodley Head in London and by Copeland and Day in Boston, Massachusetts, reproduced using a set of wood engravings made by Carl Hentschel. Beardsley's stylised signature of parallel lines appears in the top right; versions printed from the woodcut also have Hentschel's initials in the bottom left.

The original pen and ink drawings were later reproduced using a photographic lineblock process, in which the original drawings were photographed and the negatives used to create printing blocks on light-sensitive plates. The plate measures 23 by 16.8 centimetres (9.1 in × 6.6 in).

John Lane published a second version of the play on Japanese vellum in 1904 with 16 plates, including the ten original drawings, with the decorative front cover, title page and list of illustrations from the original 1894 book; added to these thirteen prints were an image of John and Solome, a second version of The Toilette of Salome, and an endpiece. Another version was published in 1907 with several new images, including Salome on a Settle.

The face of the (wo)man in the moon with drooping eyes in the first plate appears to be a caricature of Wilde himself; faces with similar features also appearing in plates 4 (The Platonic Lament), 5 (Enter Herodias) and 6 (The Eyes of Herod).

The original pen and ink drawing of The Peacock Skirt was retained by the publisher John Lane and then his widow. It was sold at auction in 1926 to art dealers, and acquired by Grenville Lindall Winthrop in 1927. Winthrop bequeathed it to the Fogg Art Museum at Harvard University in 1943.

== Gallery ==
Images from the 1904 version

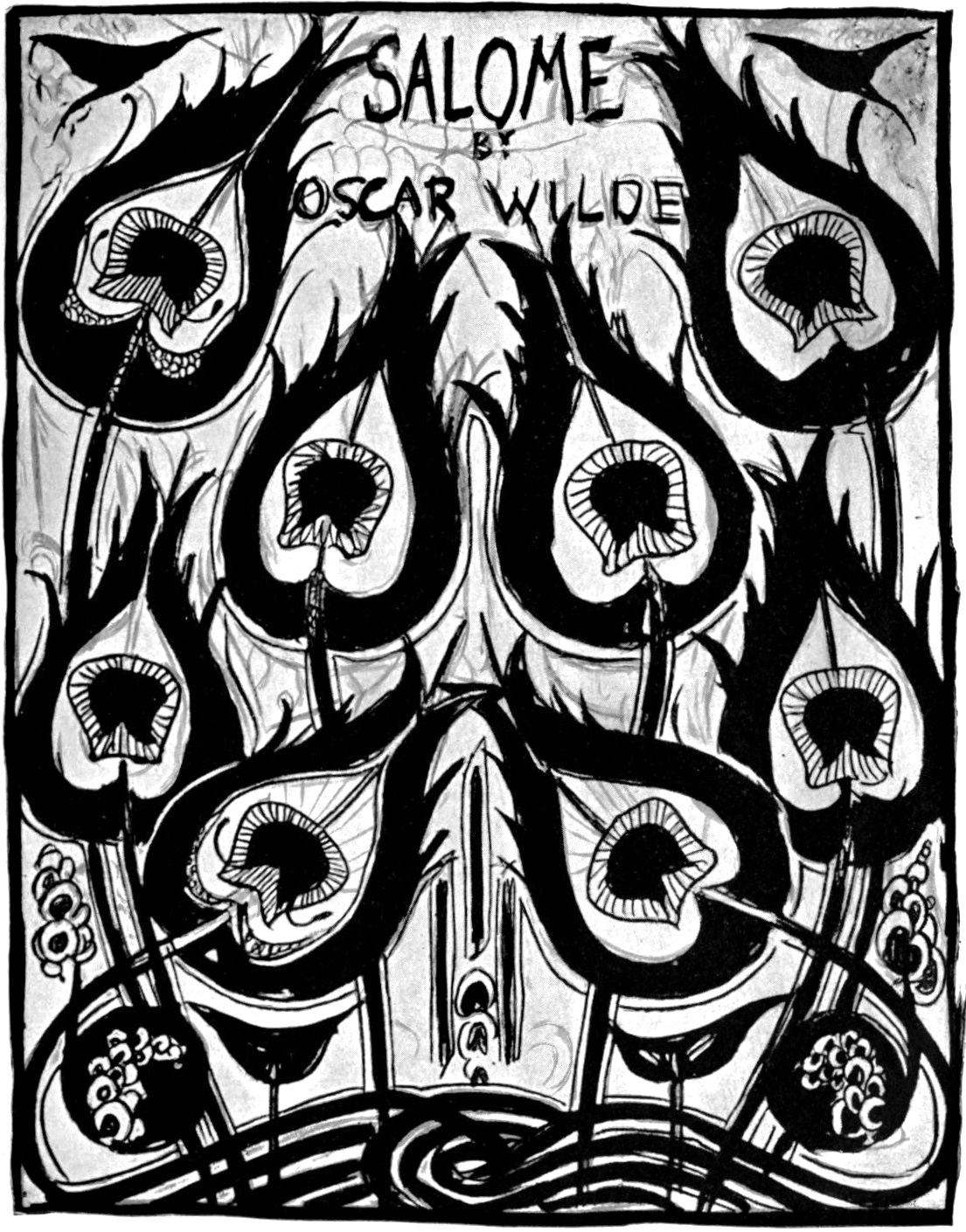
Cover design

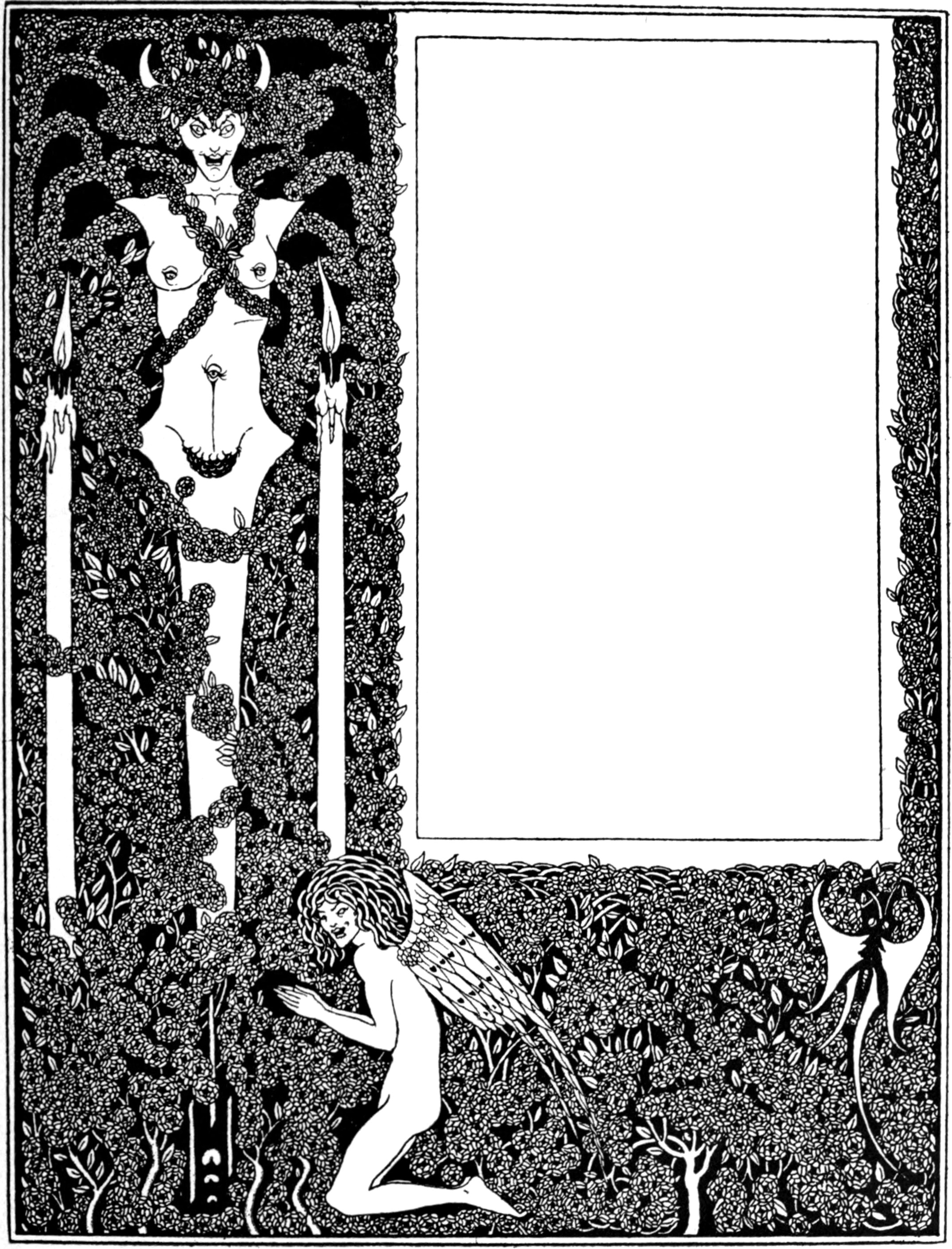
Title page

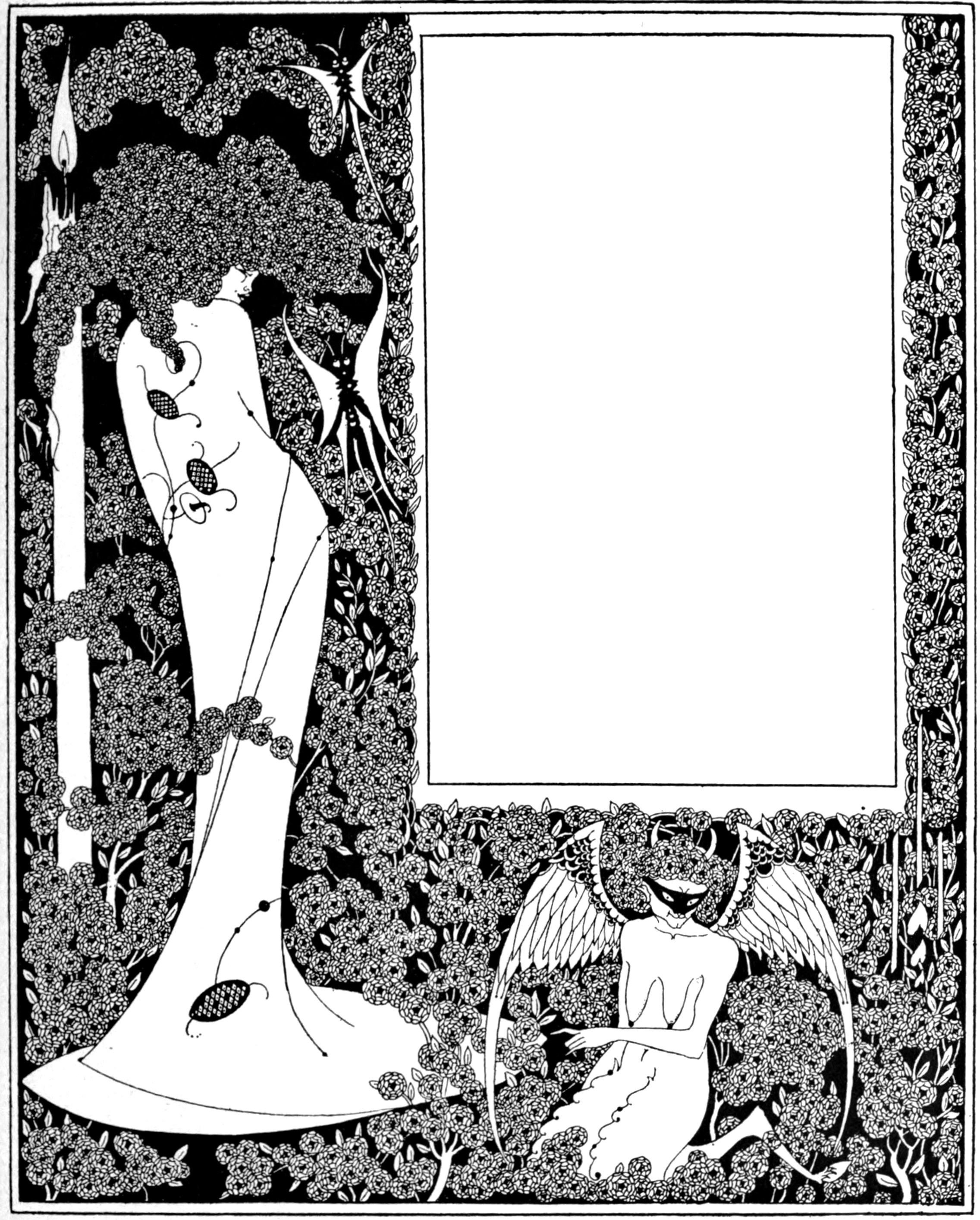
List of illustrations

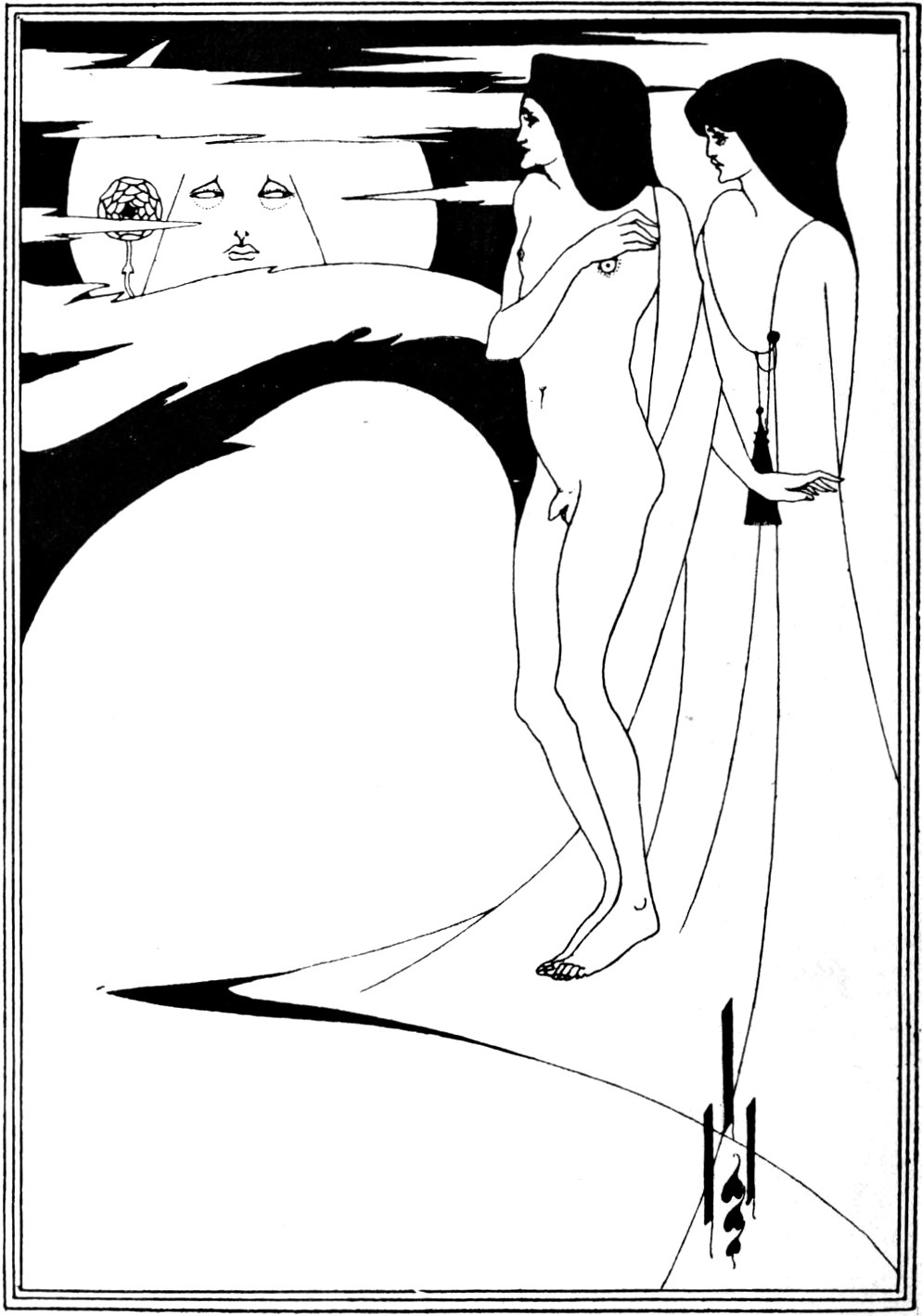
Plate 1 - The Woman in the Moon

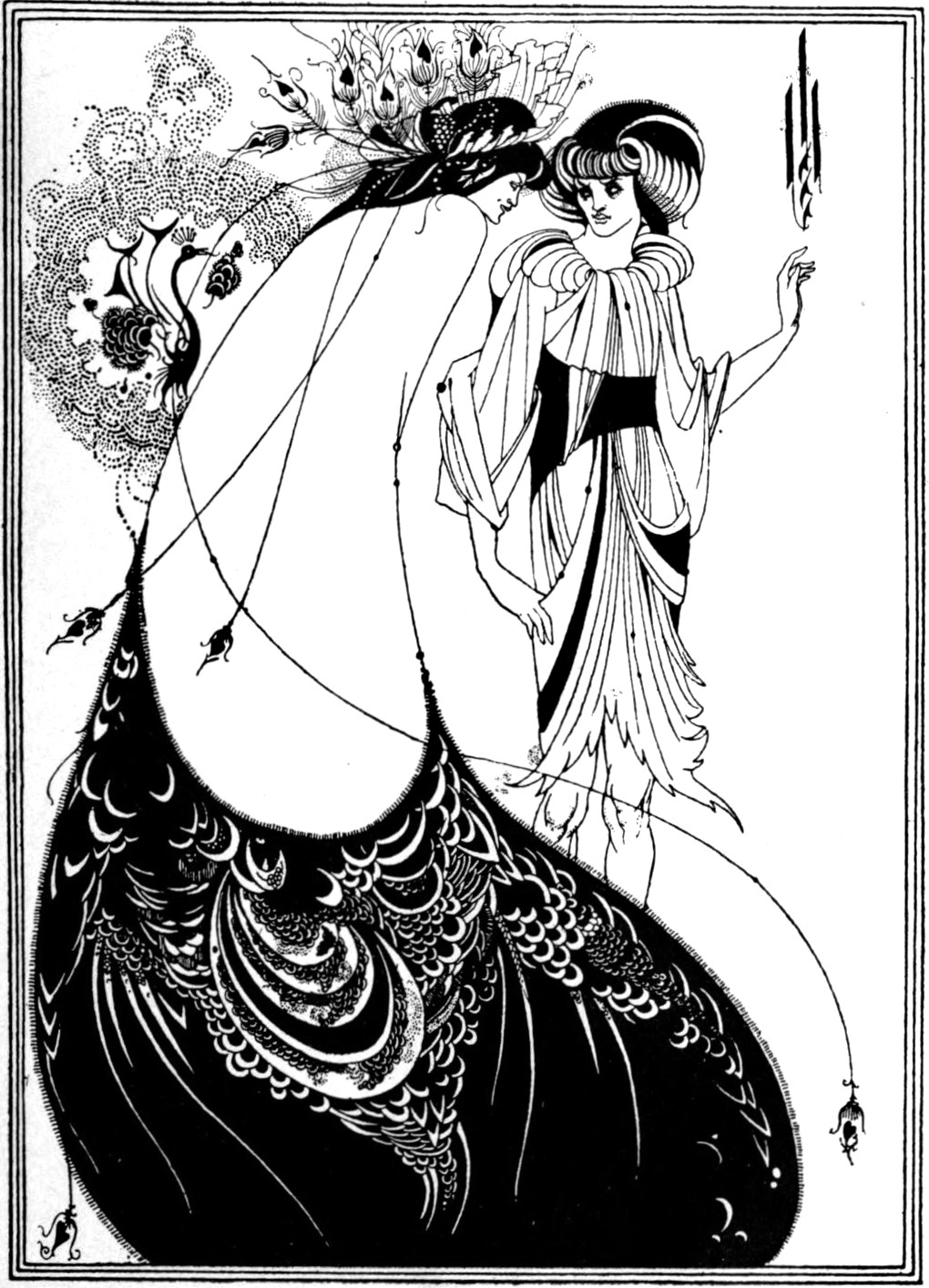
Plate 2 - The Peacock Skirt

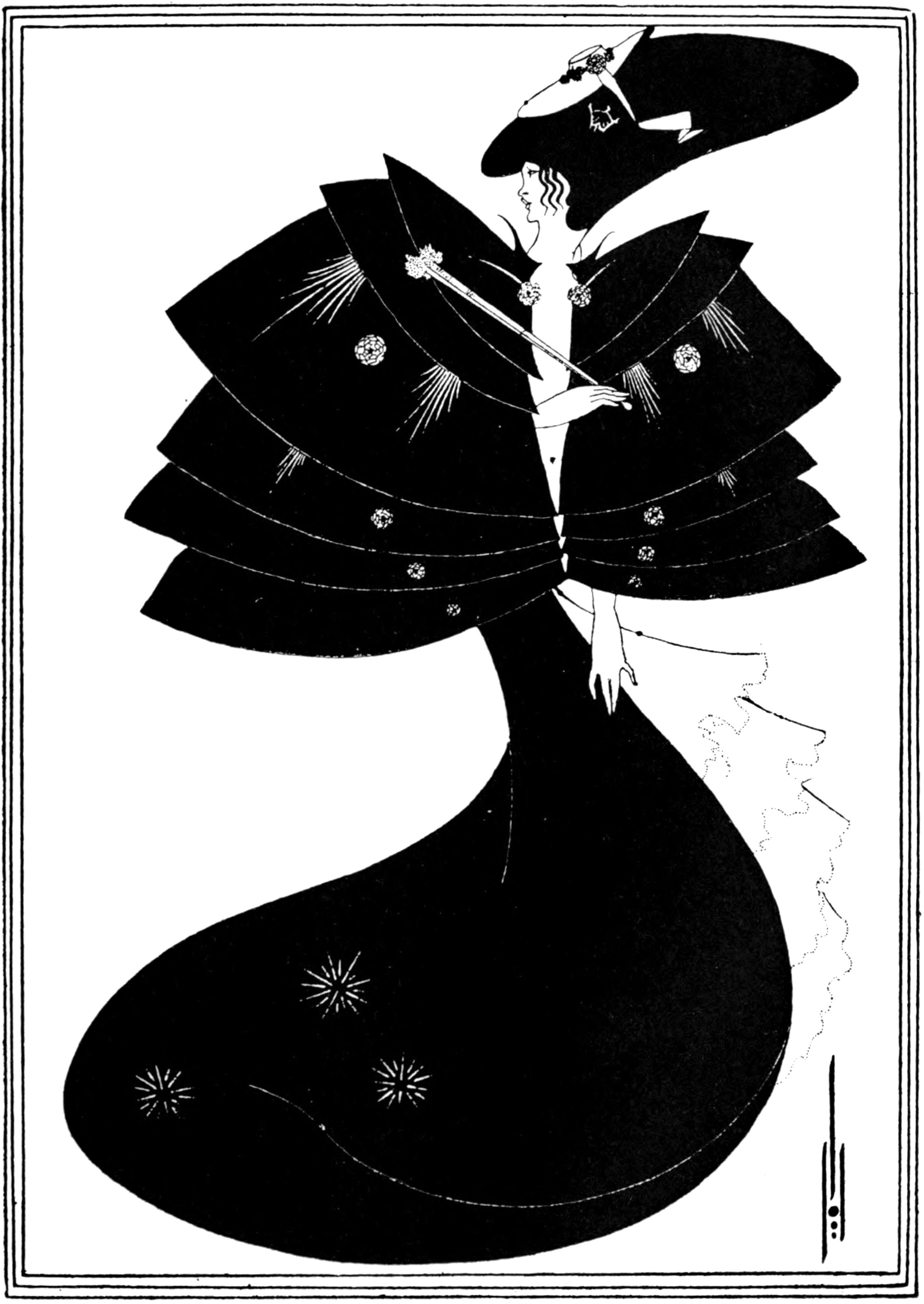
Plate 3 - The Black Cape

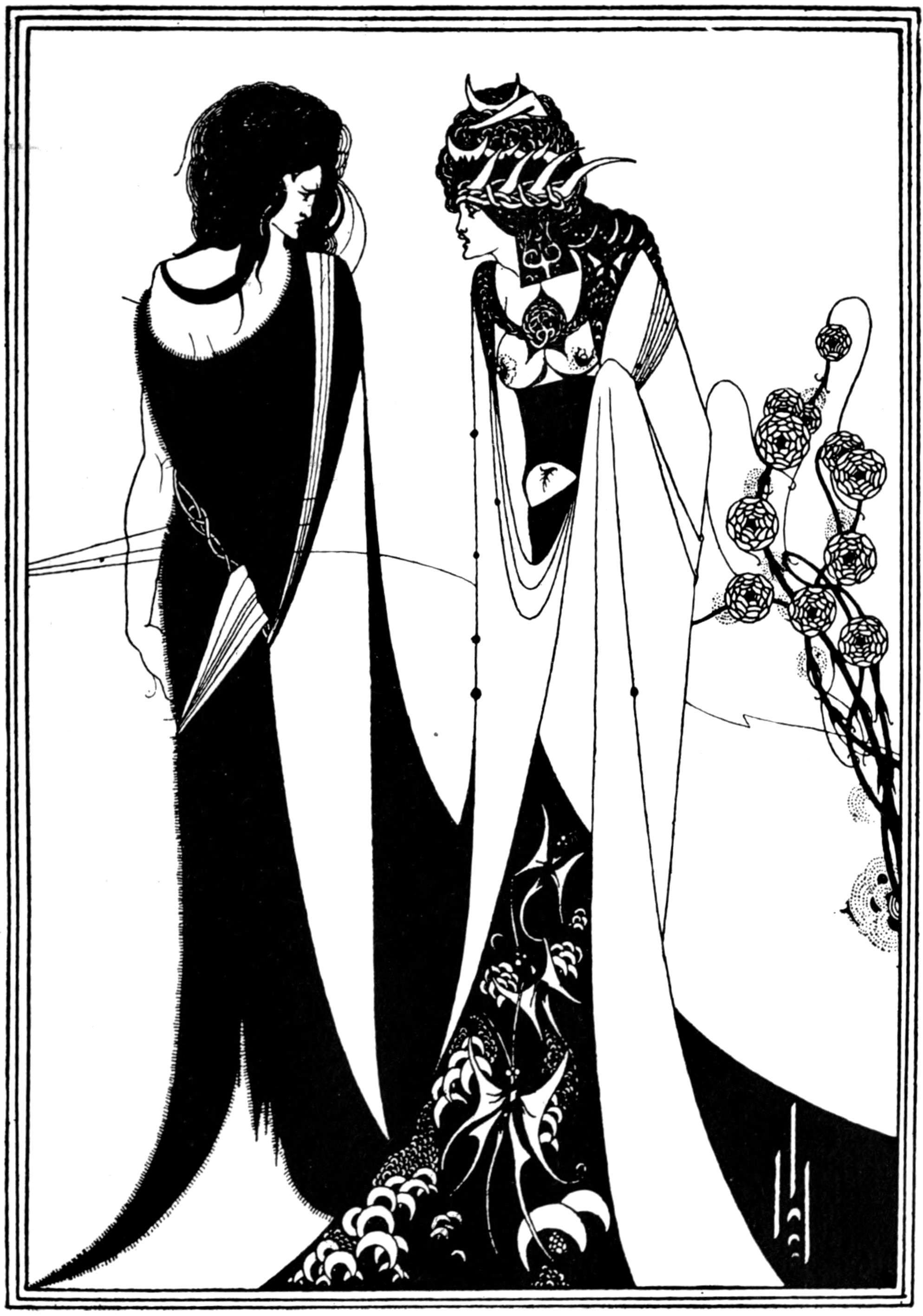
Added in 1904 - John and Salome

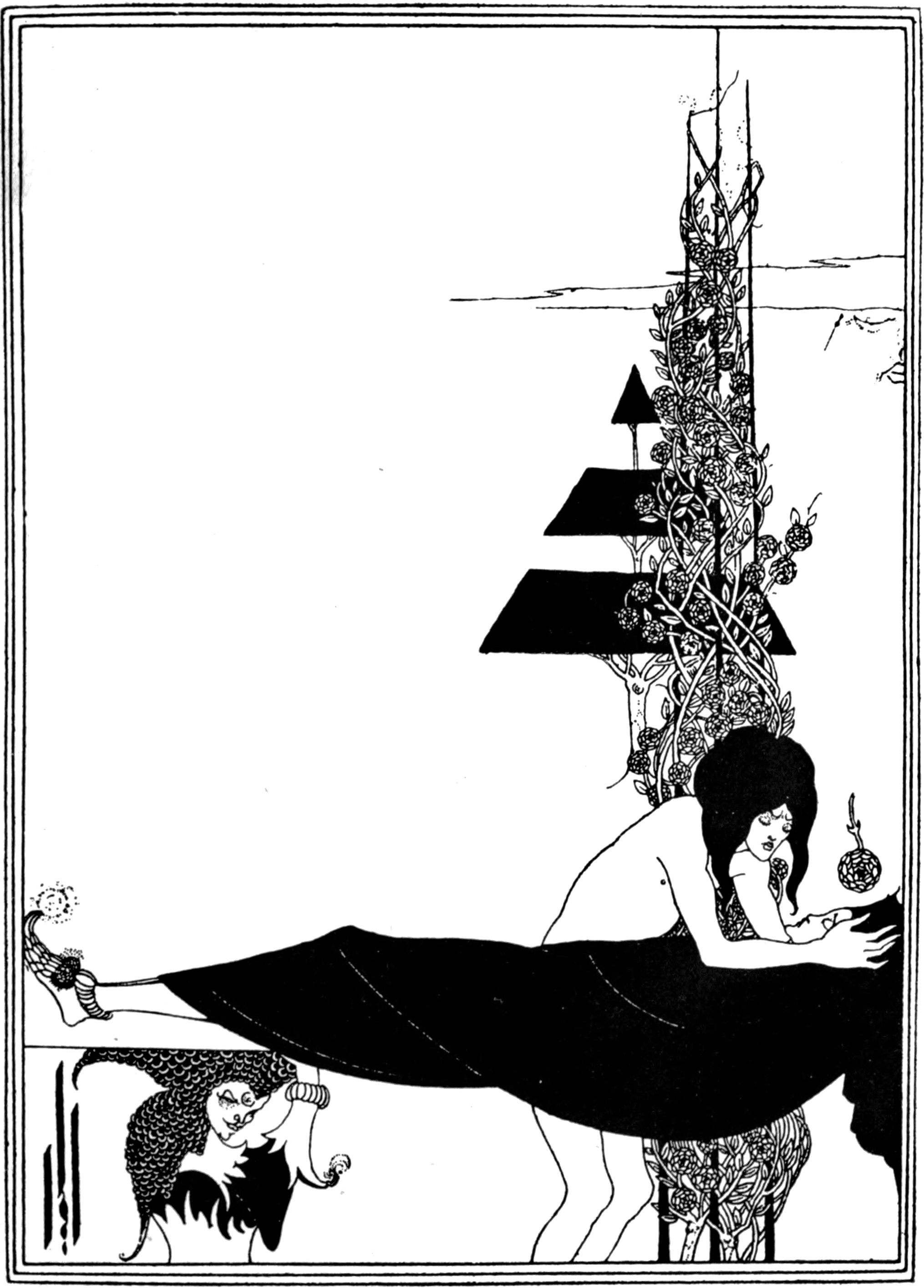
Plate 4 - The Platonic Lament

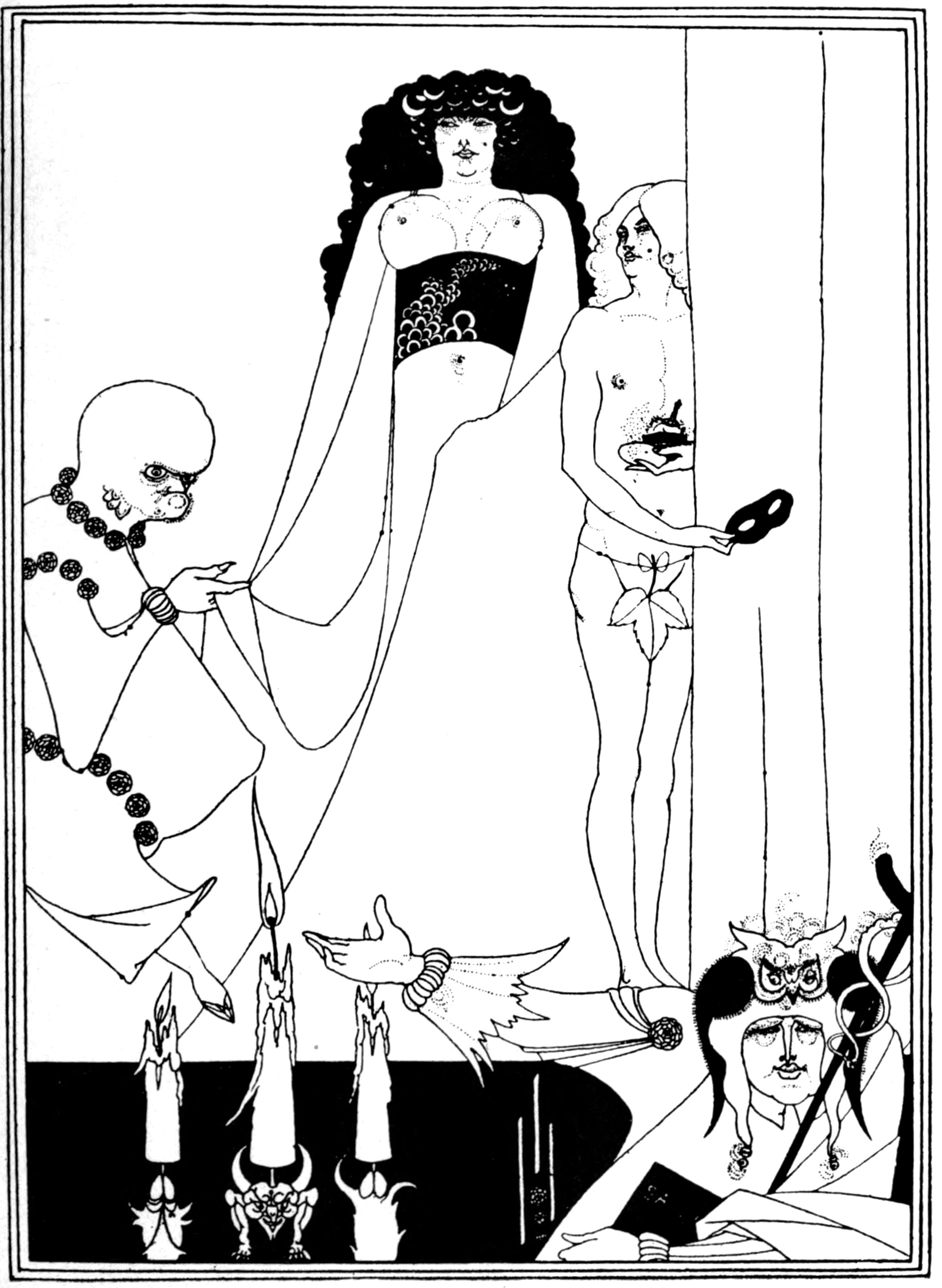
Plate 5 - Enter Herodias

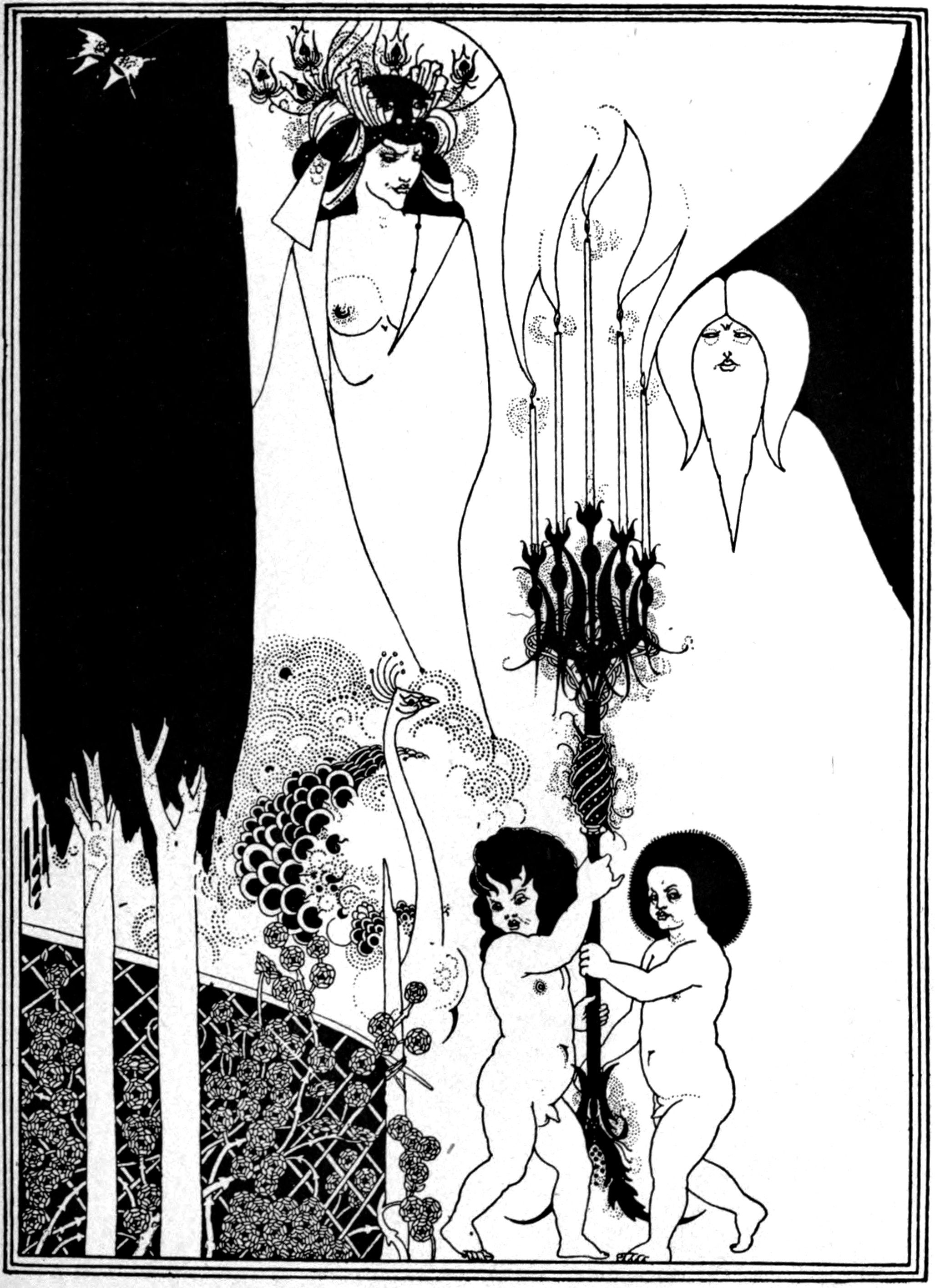
Plate 6 - The Eyes of Herod

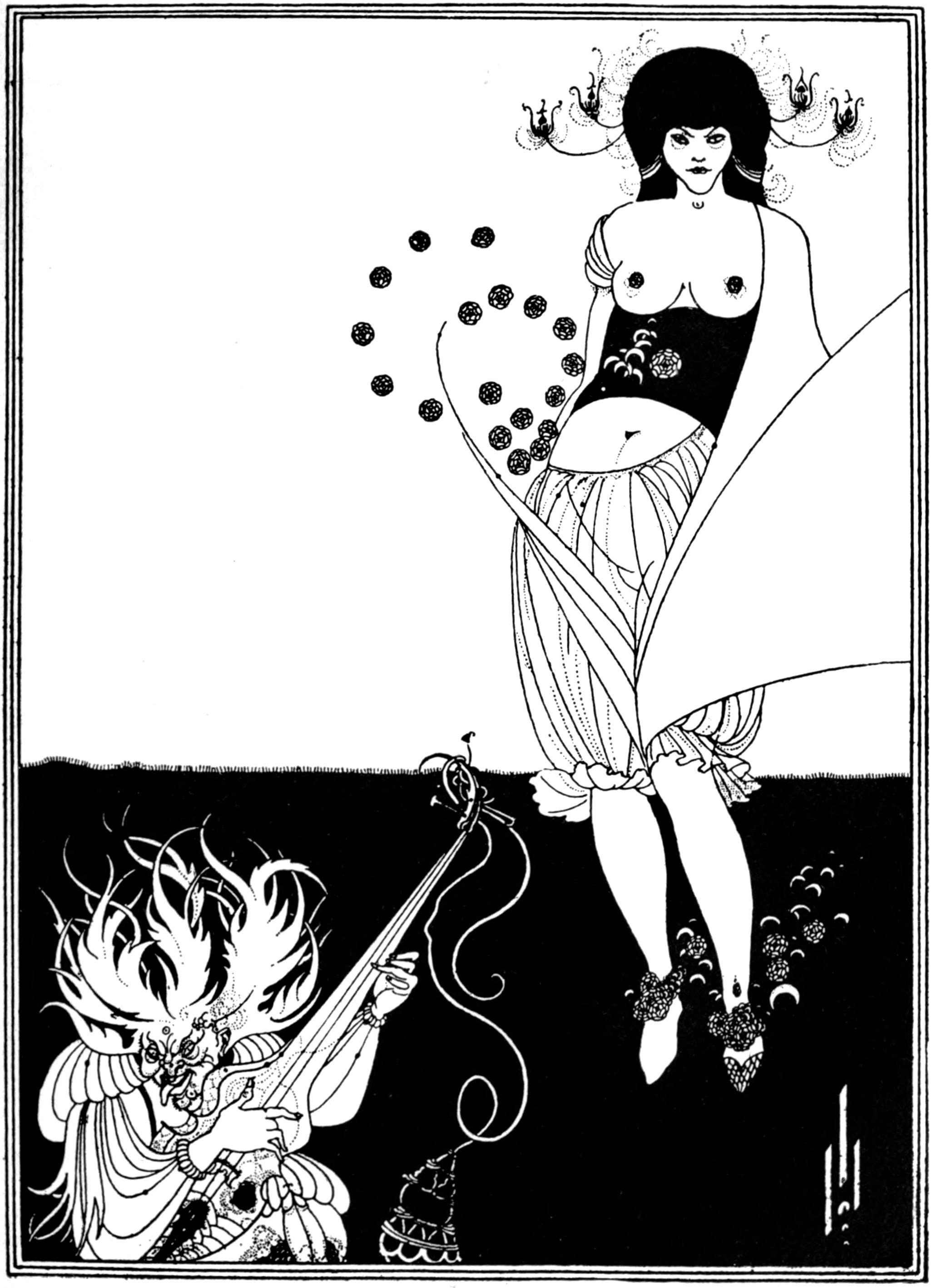
Plate 7 - The Stomach Dance

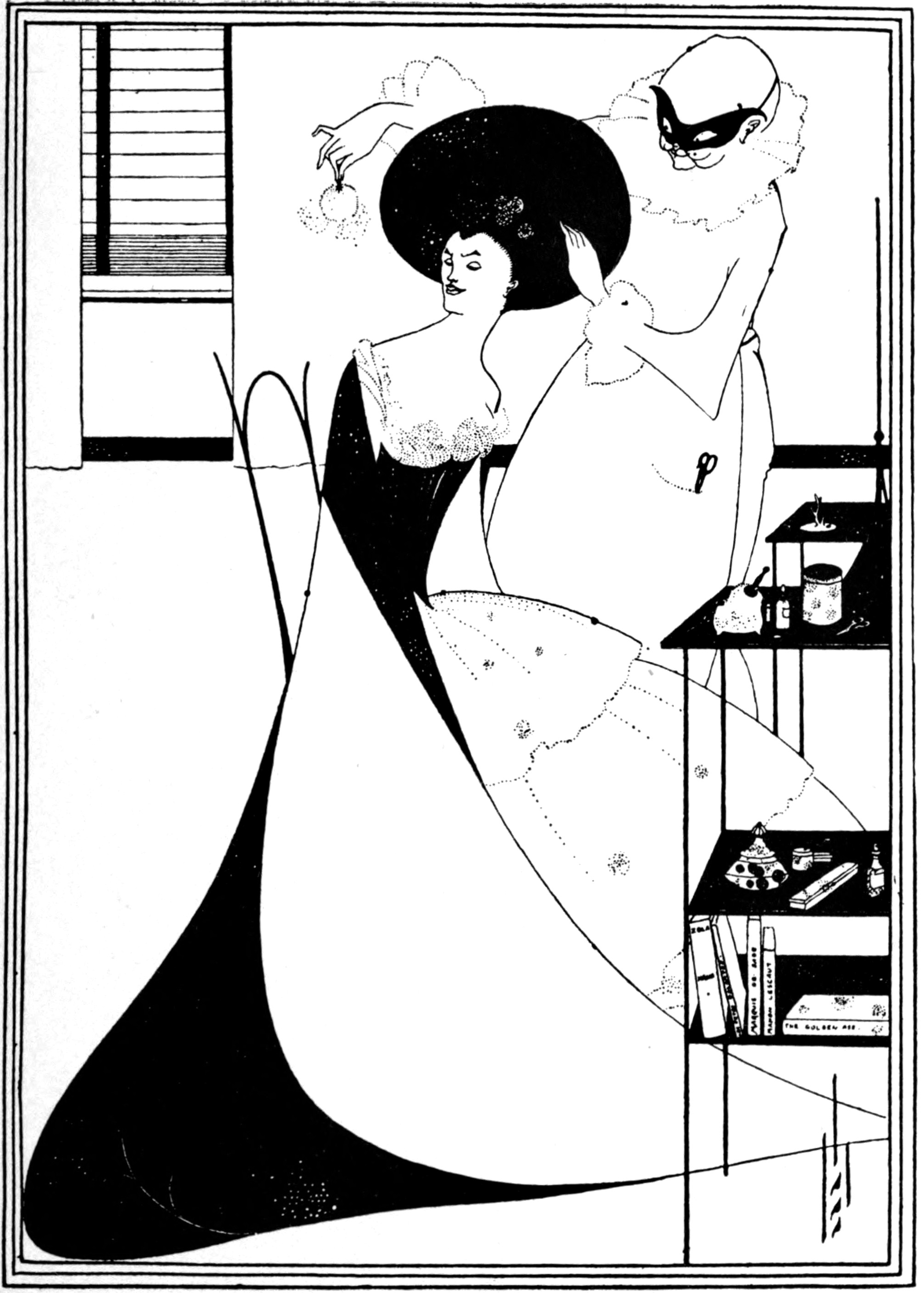
Plate 8 - The Toilette of Salome

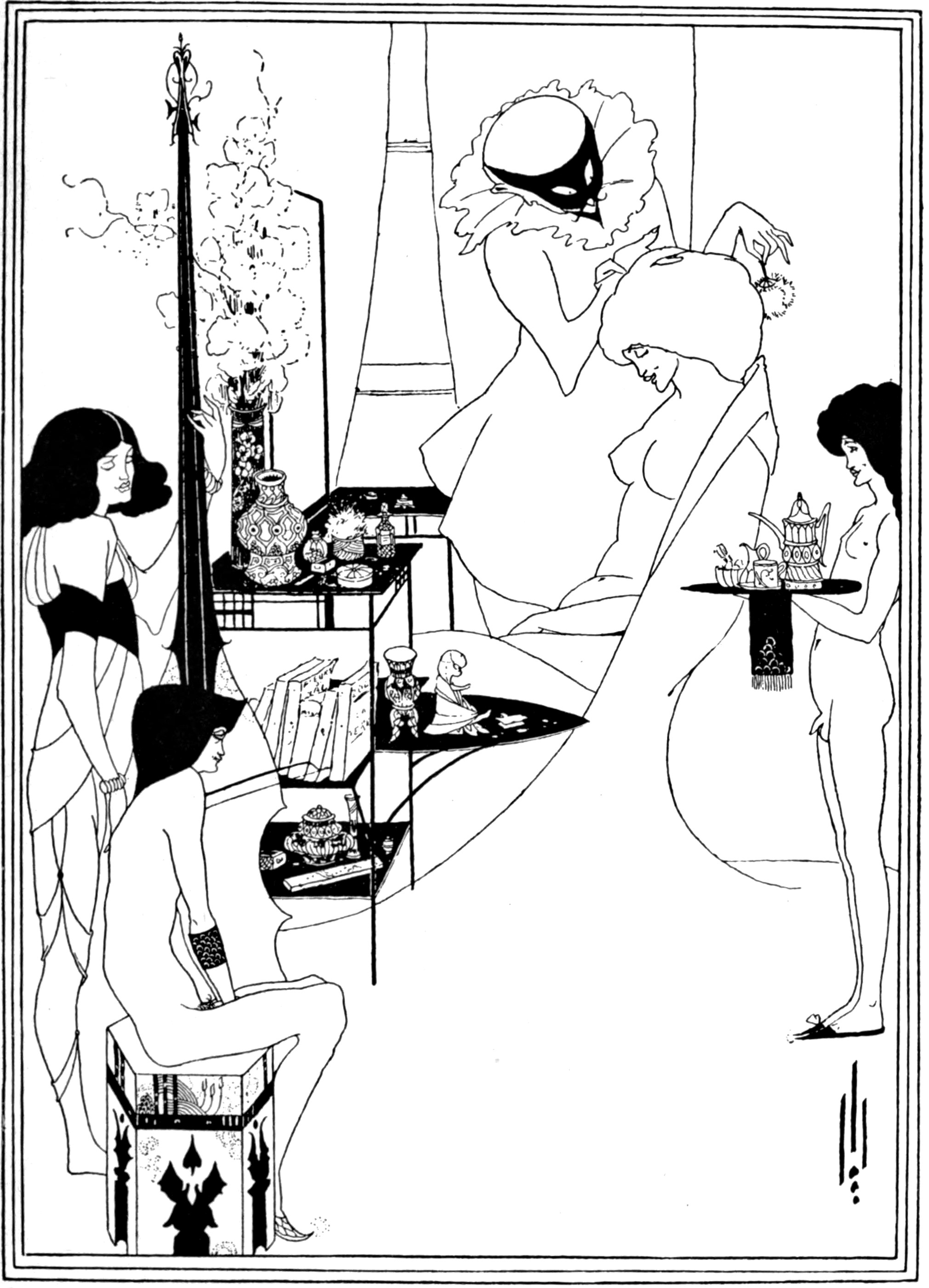
Added in 1904 - The Toilette of Salome (second version)

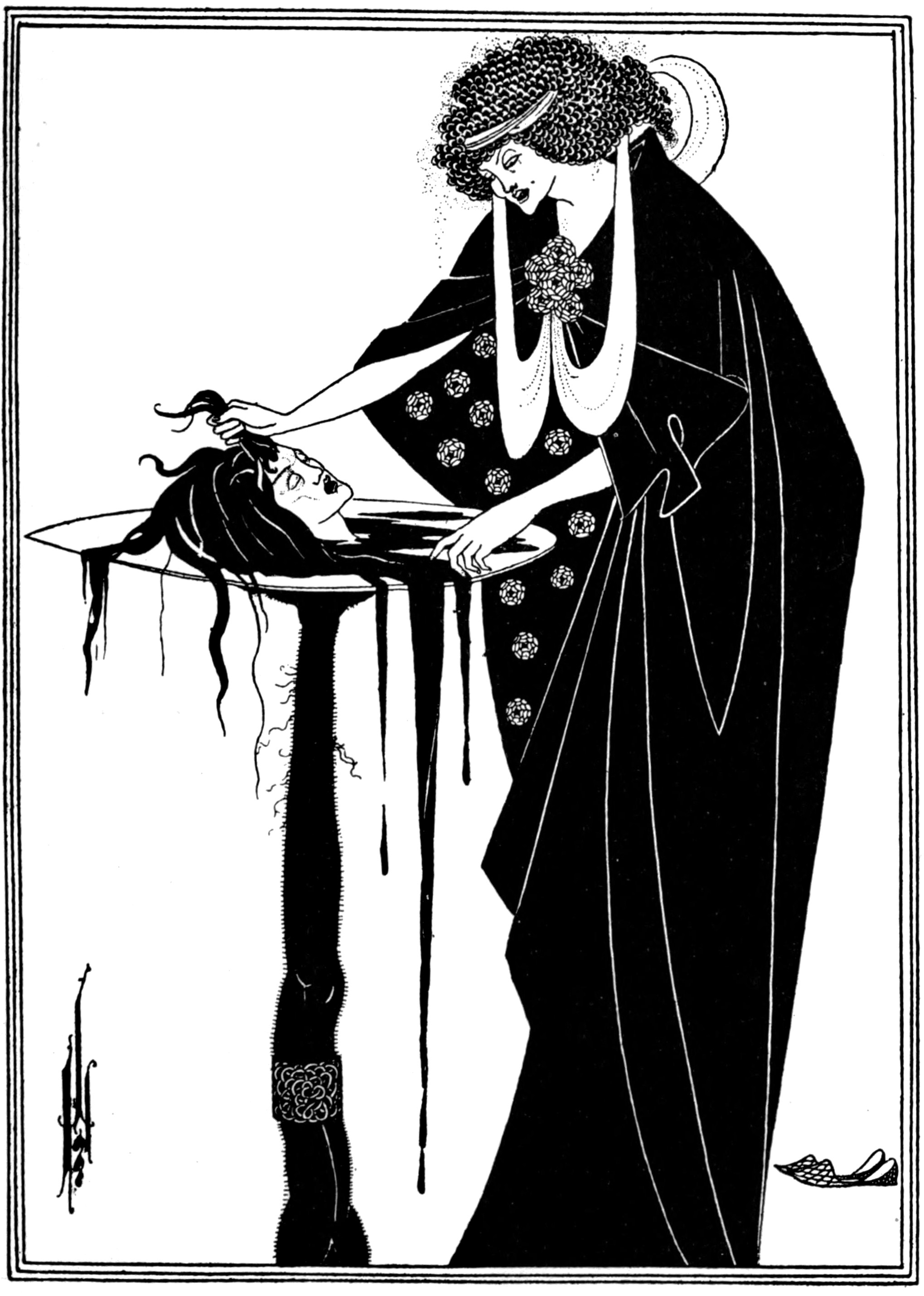
Plate 9 - The Dancer's Reward

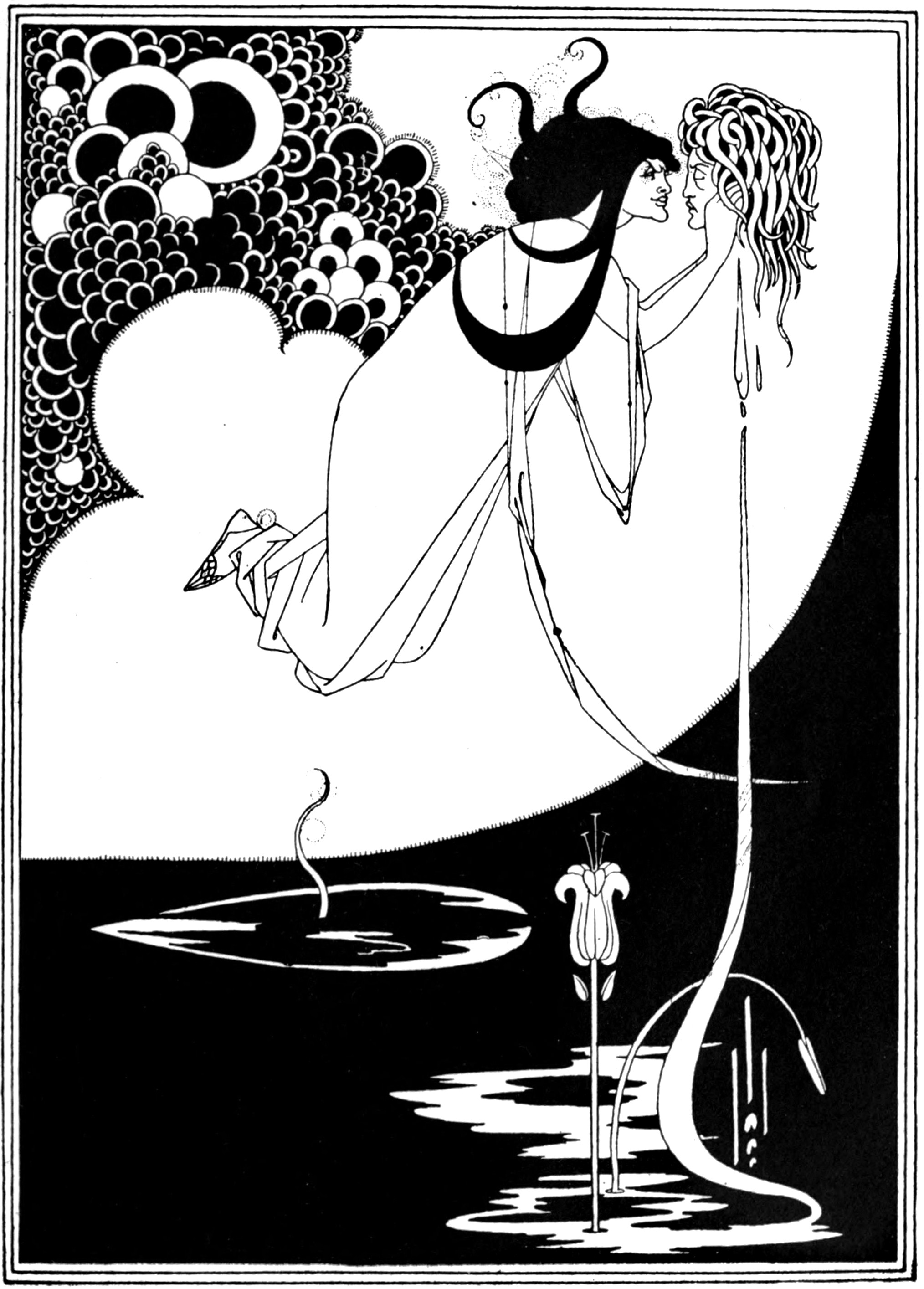
Plate 10 - The Climax

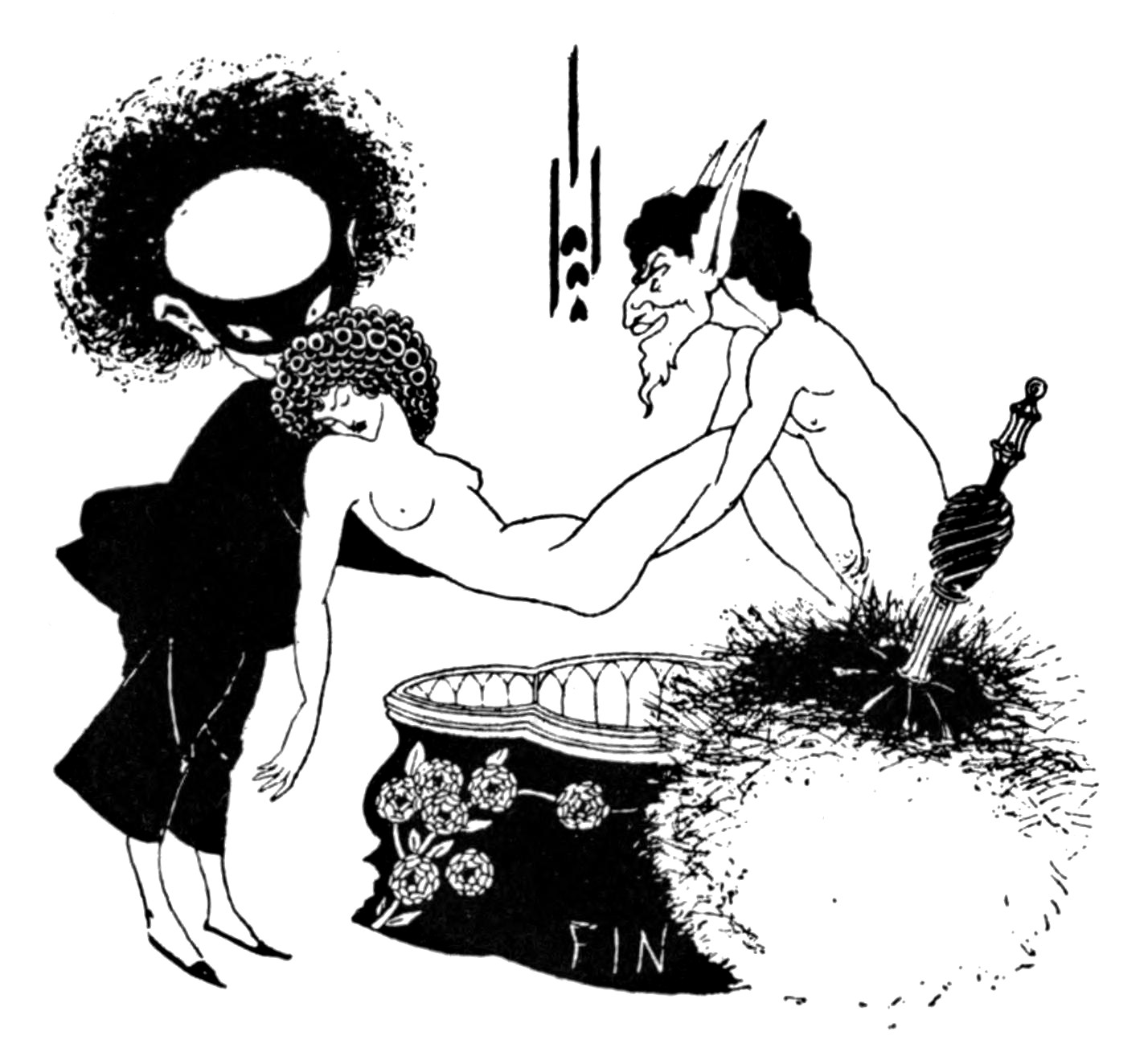
Tailpiece, added in 1904 - Cul de Lampe
