= Governor Beekman =

- Gerardus Beekman (1653–1723), Acting Governor of the Province of New York from 1710 to 1710
- Wilhelmus Beekman (1623–1707), Governor of the Colony of Swedes from 1658 to 1663

== See also ==
- Beekman Winthrop (1874–1940), Governor of Puerto Rico from 1904 to 1907
