= Grenville Lindall Winthrop =

American lawyer and art collector

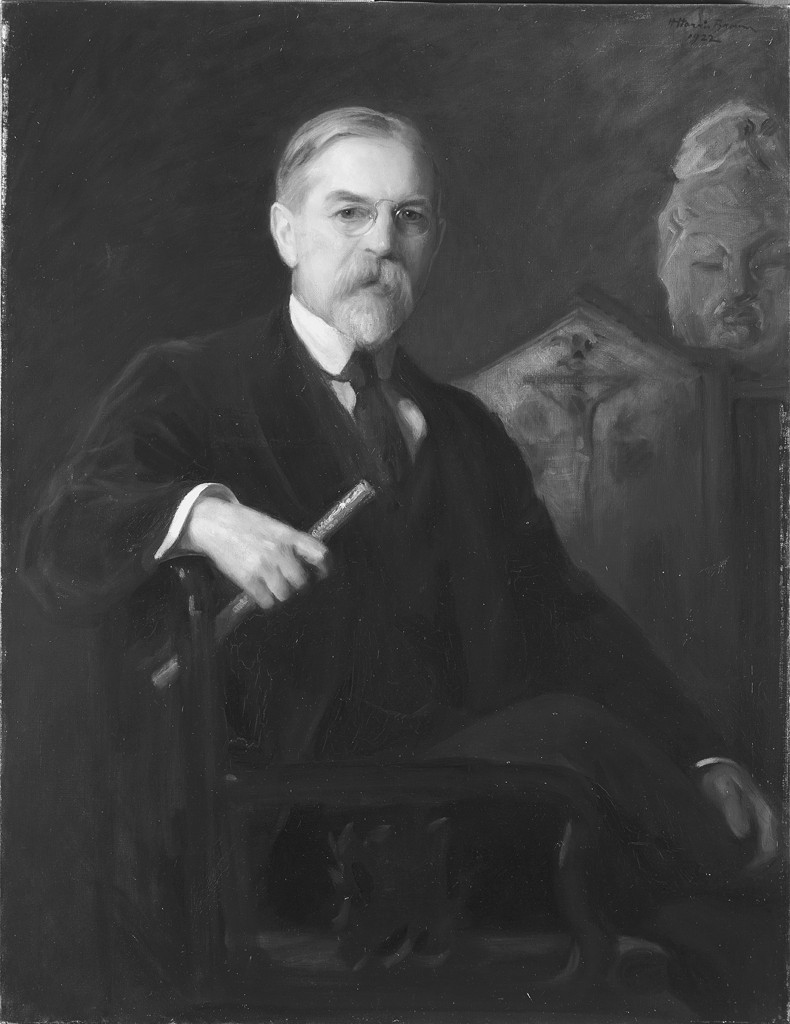
- Painting of Grenville Lindall Winthrop (1922)
- Born: February 11, 1864; New York City, U.S.
- Died: January 19, 1943 (aged 78); New York City, U.S.
- Education: Harvard University
- Occupations: Lawyer, art collector
- Spouse: Mary Tallmadge Trevor (m. 1892)
- Children: 2 daughters
- Father: Robert Winthrop
- Relatives: Moses Taylor (maternal grandfather); Beekman Winthrop (brother)

Grenville Lindall Winthrop (1864–1943) was an American lawyer and art collector from New York City. A direct descendant of John Winthrop, the first governor of the Massachusetts Bay Colony, he restored historic buildings in Lenox, Massachusetts, and assembled a large art collection in his Upper East Side townhouse. He bequeathed his entire art collection to the Fogg Art Museum of his alma mater, Harvard University.

== Early life ==
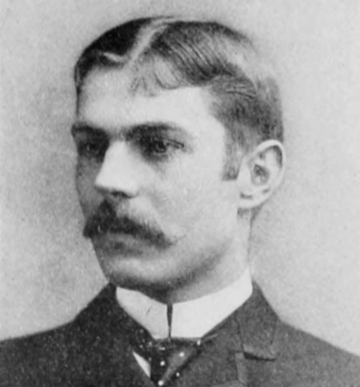
Winthrop at Harvard, c. 1886

Grenville Lindall Winthrop was born on February 11, 1864, in New York City. His father, Robert Winthrop, was a banker. His mother, Kate Wilson Taylor, was the daughter of banker Moses Taylor. He was a direct descendant of John Winthrop, the first governor of the Massachusetts Bay Colony. His brother, Beekman Winthrop, went on to serve as the governor of Puerto Rico from 1904 to 1907. He had another brother, Frederic Winthrop.

He graduated from Harvard University with a Bachelor of Arts degree in geology and art history in 1886 and an LL.B. in 1889. While he was studying at Harvard, he lived at Beck Hall, and he was a member of the Porcellian Club.

== Career ==
Winthrop co-founded a law firm in New York City with James B. Ludlow and Frederick Philips. He retired in 1896.

== Philanthropy ==
Winthrop restored a number of buildings in Lenox, Massachusetts, namely the Church on the Hill, a Congregational church; the Lenox Academy, later known as the Lenox Academy; and the Colonial Courthouse, which houses the Lenox Library as a result of his patronage. Subsequently, Winthrop served as the President of the Lenox Library.

Winthrop served as the President of the Women's Hospital in New York City from 1915 to 1941.

== Art collection ==
Winthrop was an "internationally known art collector." He was influenced from an early age by Charles Eliot Norton and his nephew, Francis Bullard, two prominent art collectors from Boston. He was assisted in assembling his collection by Martin Birnbaum, an art dealer from New York City. Winthrop never lent any of his artwork to museums. When he showed visitors around his collection, he pretended to be the butler.

Winthrop collected "early Wedgwood, Pre-Raphaelite paintings, Mesoamerican masks, gold-ground Italian paintings, French drawings, clocks, Korean Buddhas." Initially, Winthrop focused on collecting the bulk of a given artist's work. He owned the largest individual collection of paintings by Jean-Auguste-Dominique Ingres and William Blake. Additionally, he owned paintings by Edward Burne-Jones, Honoré Daumier, Jacques-Louis David, Vincent van Gogh, Winslow Homer, Pierre-Auguste Renoir, Auguste Rodin, John Singer Sargent, Henri de Toulouse-Lautrec, James Abbott McNeill Whistler, Gustave Moreau, Théodore Géricault, Eugène Delacroix, Théodore Chassériau, John Singleton Copley, Gilbert Stuart, and Aubrey Beardsley. The collection also included major collections of Chinese and Asian art including jades, bronzes, ceramics, sculpture, and wall paintings. Some of these sub-collections now rank with the finest of their kind in any art museum.

Winthrop's collection amounted to 4,000 objects by the time of his death.

Winthrop served on the Visiting Committee of the Fogg Art Museum at Harvard University for twelve years.

== Personal life ==
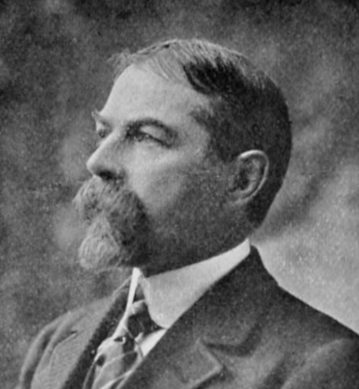
c. 1911

Winthrop married Mary Tallmadge Trevor in 1892. They had two daughters, Emily and Katherine. In New York City, they resided in a townhouse in Murray Hill, Manhattan, until they moved to 15 East 81st Street on the Upper East Side. They summered at Groton Place, a 150-acre estate spreading across the Baldhead Mountain in Lenox, Massachusetts, whose main house was designed by Carrère and Hastings and whose grounds included 500 peacocks and pheasants. His wife predeceased him in 1900. His daughters were educated by private tutors; despite his attentive parenting, they both eloped with the help: one with a chauffeur, the other one with an electrician.

Winthrop was described by art critic Richard Dorment as "a figure straight out of the pages of Henry James."

== Death and legacy ==
Winthrop died on January 19, 1943, in New York City. His funeral was held at the Grace Episcopal Church. He was buried at the Green-Wood Cemetery.

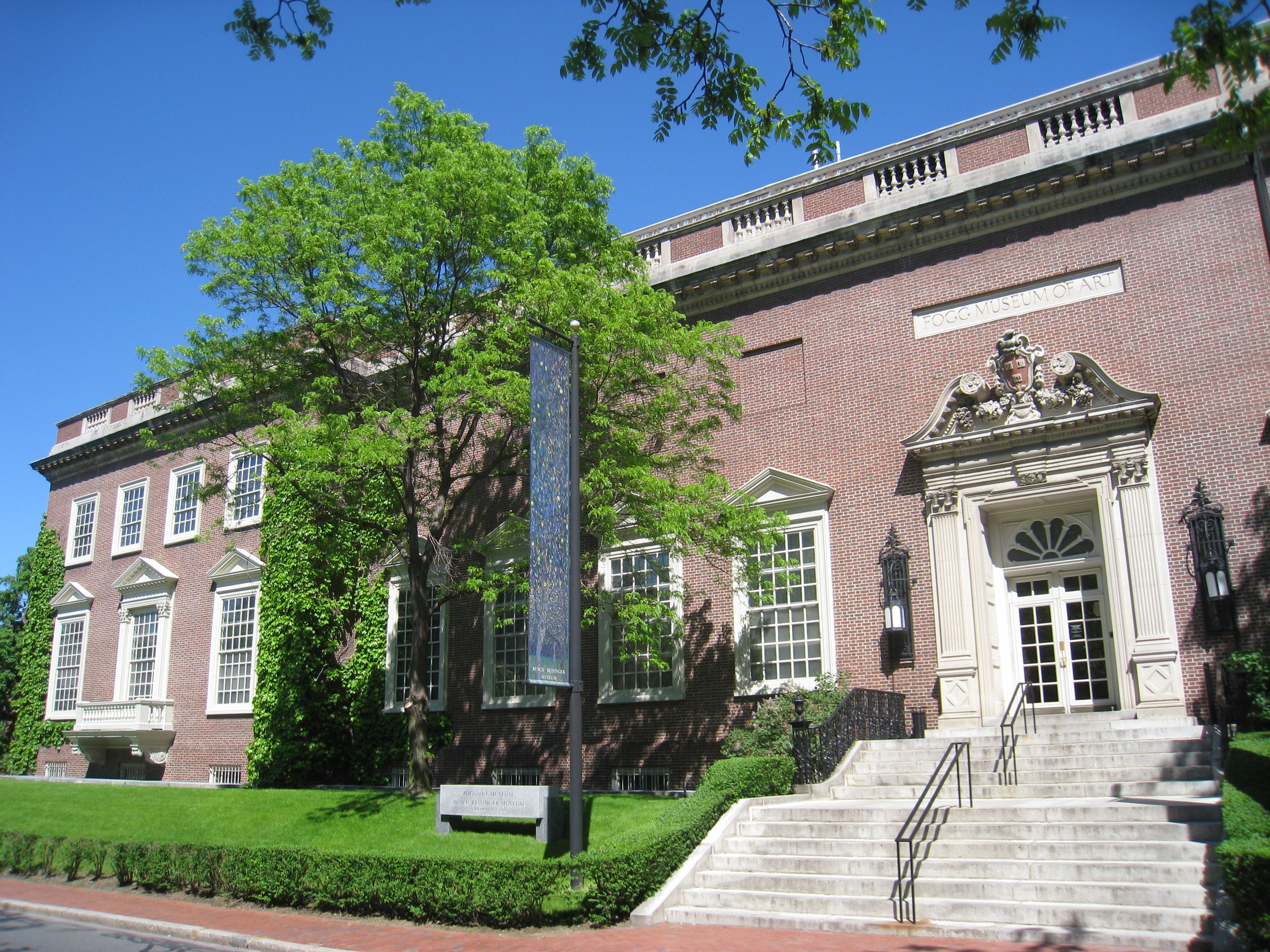
The Fogg Art Museum, home to the Grenville L. Winthrop Collection

Winthrop bequeathed his art collection to the Fogg Art Museum at his alma mater, Harvard University. His will had a clause whereby the museum could only lend his artwork to other museums if they donated US$100,000 to the Foundling Hospital in New York City. In the early 2000s, as inflation meant that the sum was less colossal than in 1937, the university decided to donated the sum to the hospital and plan a worldwide exhibition. By 2003–2004, his entire art collection was exhibited at the Musée des Beaux-Arts de Lyon in France, followed by the National Gallery in London, the Metropolitan Museum of Art in New York City, and the National Gallery of Art in Washington, D.C. The exhibit was called "A Private Passion: 19th-Century Paintings and Drawings from the Grenville L Winthrop Collection, Harvard University."

Winthrop's Lenox estate, Groton Place, was purchased by educator Max Bondy, who opened the Windsor Mountain School there shortly after Winthrop's death. It is now owned by Boston University.
