= William Dillingham =

William Dillingham may refer to:

- William Dillingham (academic) (c. 1617–1689), English academic and poet
- William H. Dillingham (1791–1854), American politician and lawyer from Pennsylvania
- William P. Dillingham (1843–1923), American attorney and politician
