= Sotterley (Hollywood, Maryland) =

Historic house in Maryland, United States

- Sotterley Plantation
- U.S. National Register of Historic Places
- U.S. National Historic Landmark
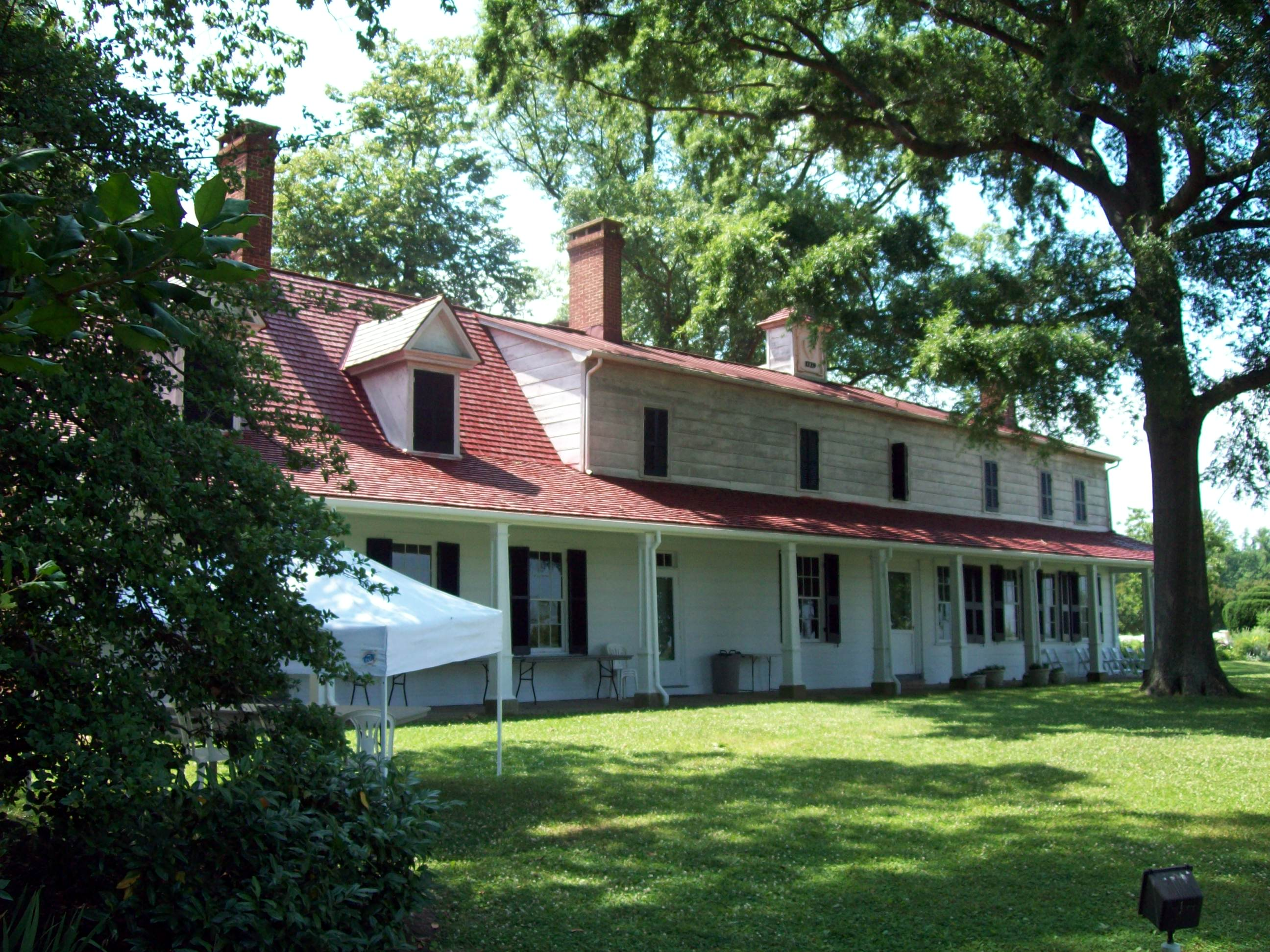
- Sotterly Plantation, July 2009

- Location within Maryland Location within the United States
- Location: 44300 Sotterley Lane, Hollywood, Maryland, 20636
- Coordinates: 38°22′47″N 76°32′20″W
- Area: 360.8 acres (146.0 ha)
- Built: 1703
- NRHP reference No.: 72001487
- Designated NHL: February 16, 2000

Sotterley Plantation is a historic landmark plantation house located at 44300 Sotterley Lane in Hollywood, St. Mary's County, Maryland, USA. It is a long 1 1/2-story, nine-bay frame building, covered with wide, beaded clapboard siding and wood shingle roof, overlooking the Patuxent River. Also on the property are a sawn-log slave quarters of c. 1830, an 18th-century brick warehouse, and an early-19th-century brick meat house. Farm buildings include an early-19th-century corn crib and an array of barns and work buildings from the early 20th century. Opened to the public in 1961, it was once the home of George Plater (1735–1792), the sixth Governor of Maryland, and Herbert L. Satterlee (1863–1947), a New York business lawyer and son-in-law of J.P. Morgan.

The house was listed on the National Register of Historic Places in 1972. Sotterley was declared a National Historic Landmark in 2000, its national significance due to the extremely rare surviving elements of the main house's oldest phase, a c. 1717 post in ground structure, and the other elements of its later historical architecture and landscape.

== Sotterley Plantation ==
Sotterley Plantation is the only Tidewater plantation in Maryland open to the public that offers visitor activities and educational programs. Visitors can tour the early 18th-century mansion, an original slave cabin, a customs warehouse, smokehouse, necessary and corn crib, as well as a formal Colonial Revival garden. The property comprises 95 acres (380,000 m^{2}) of rolling fields, gardens, and riverfront.

== History ==
Julius Clifton Callis was the dockmaster for Sotterly Wharf. He was born in 1882. Several of his brothers occasionally worked at the wharf and his brother Noah moved into the wharf house as caretaker after Julius died in 1938.

Laura Virginia Callis attended Sotterley School. This class picture was taken there about 1918. Laura Virginia Callis stands second from the left in the second row. She was the daughter of Julius Clifton Callis and Laura Callis. The school closed by 1922.

== Gallery ==
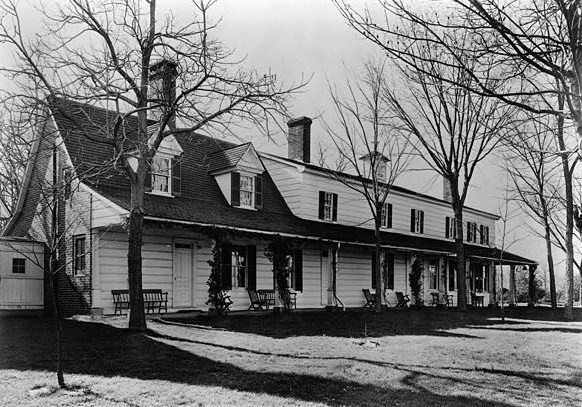
Sotterly Plantation, Historic Photograph

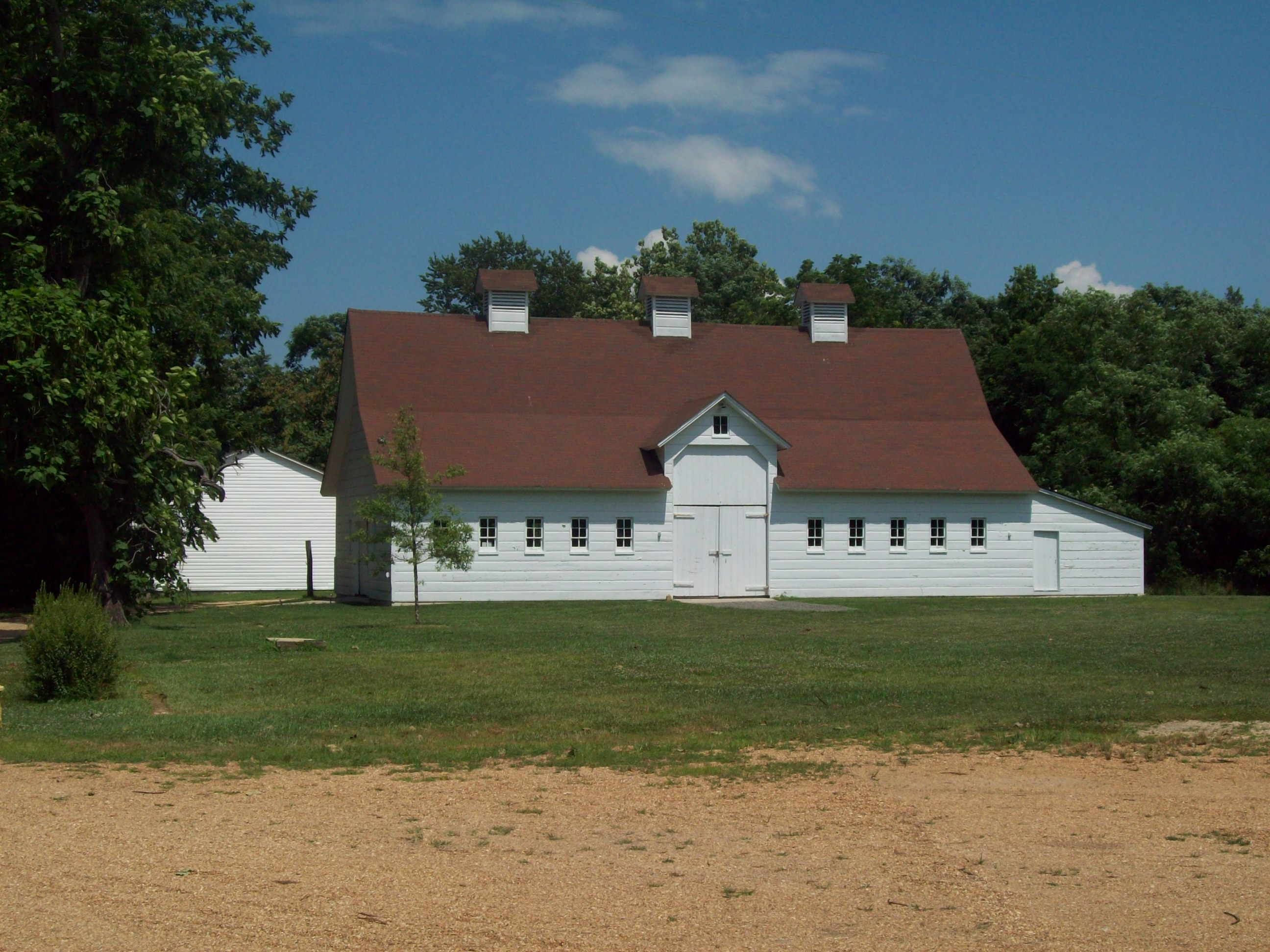
Sotterley Plantation, Barn, July 2009

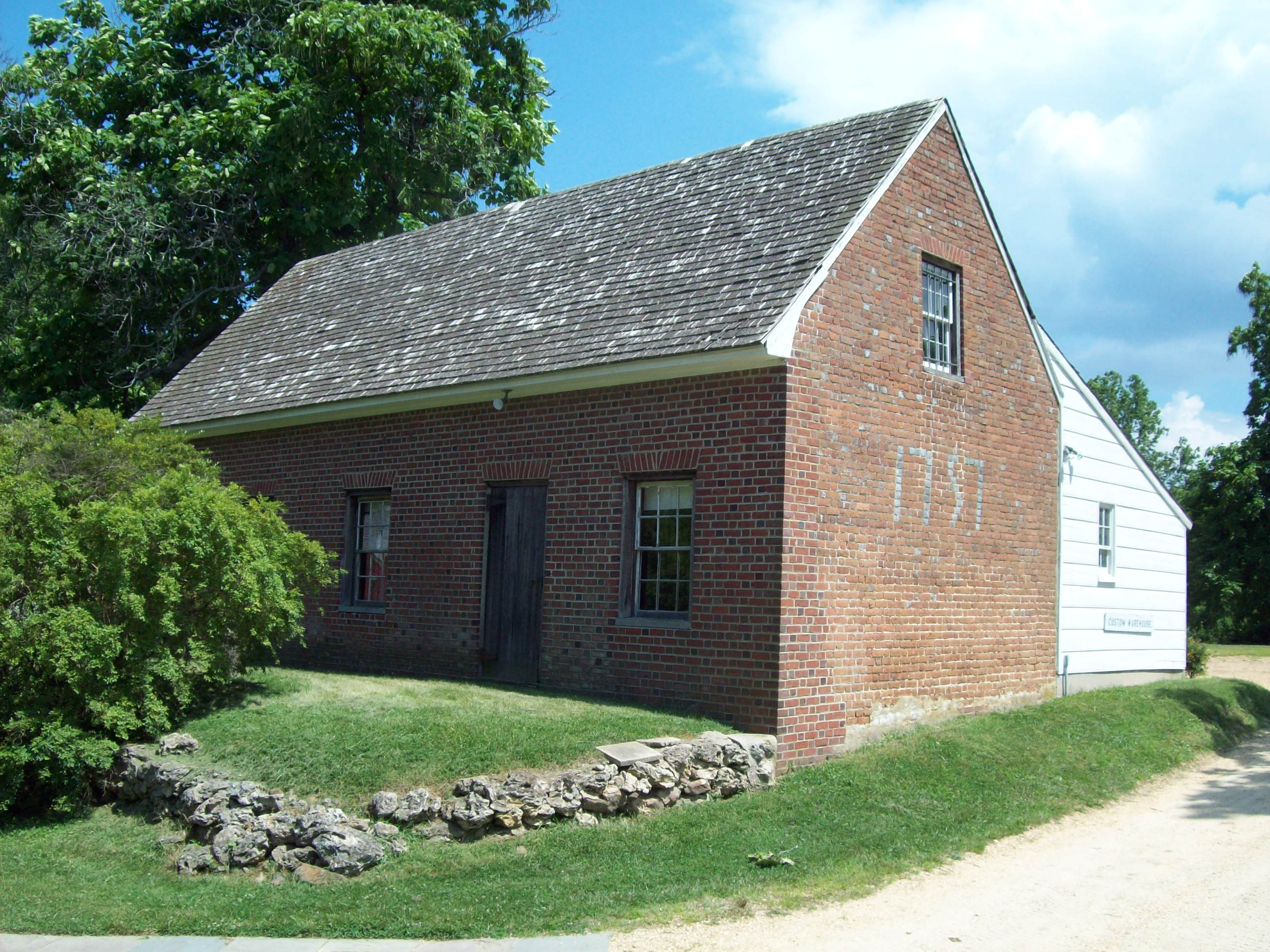
Sotterley Plantation, Customs Warehouse, July 2009
