= Herbert L. Satterlee =

American lawyer, writer and businessman

Herbert Livingston Satterlee
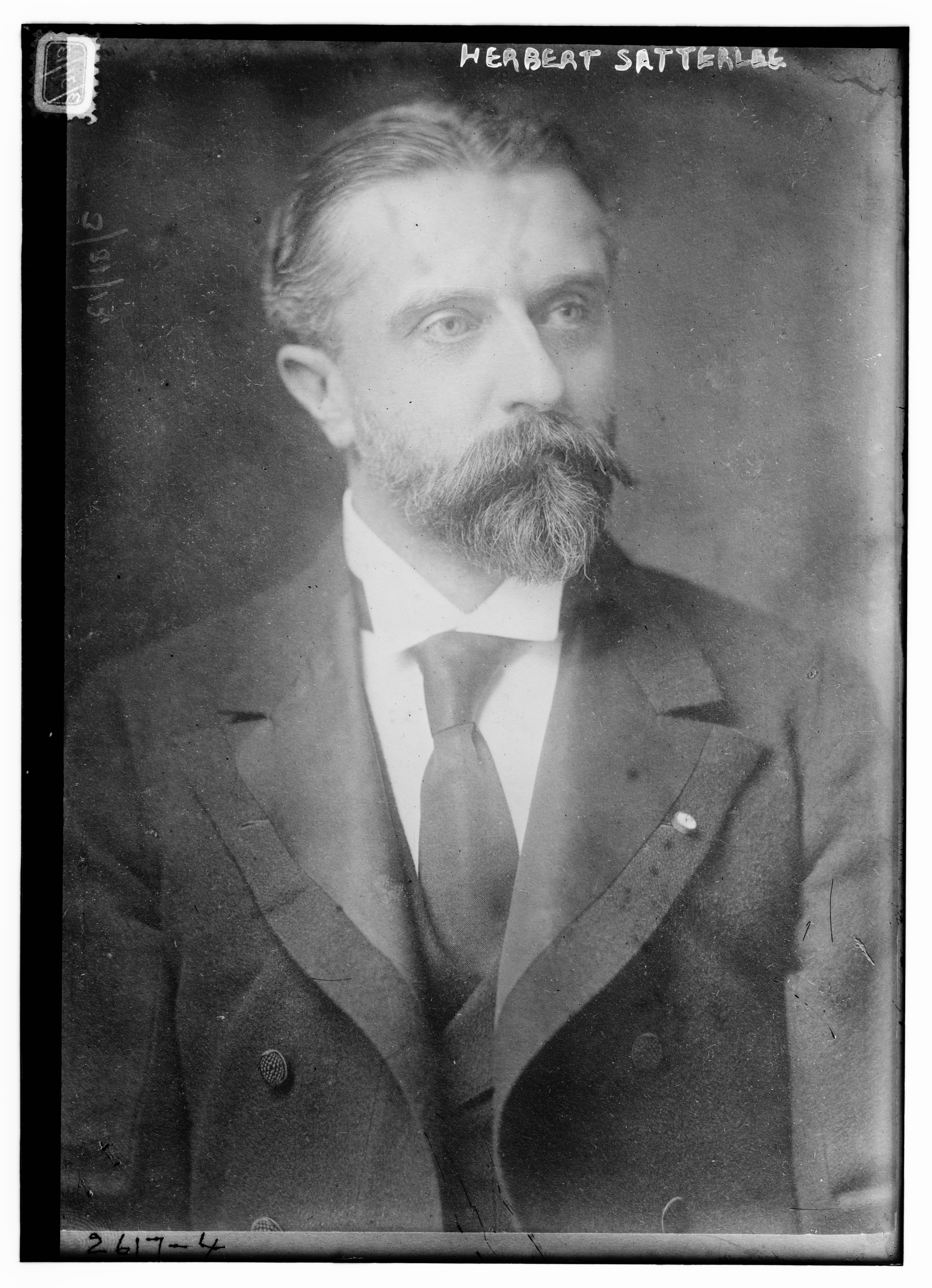
- Satterlee circa 1915

10th Assistant Secretary of the Navy
- In office December 3, 1908 – March 5, 1909
- Appointed by: Theodore Roosevelt
- Preceded by: Truman Handy Newberry
- Succeeded by: Beekman Winthrop

Personal details
- Born: October 31, 1863 New York City, New York, U.S.
- Died: July 14, 1947 (aged 83) New York City, New York, U.S.
- Spouse: Louisa Pierpont Morgan (m. 1900; died 1946)
- Children: 2
- Parent(s): George Bowen Satterlee; Sarah Wilcox
- Education: Columbia University; Columbia Law School

Herbert Livingston Satterlee (October 31, 1863 – July 14, 1947) was an American lawyer, writer, and businessman who served as the Assistant Secretary of the Navy from 1908 to 1909.

== Early life ==
Herbert Livingston Satterlee was born in New York City in 1863. He was the son of George Bowen Satterlee (1833–1903) and Sarah Brady Wilcox (b. 1836). His siblings included Marion Satterlee and Richard T. Satterlee.

Through his paternal grandmother, Mary LeRoy (née Livingston) Satterlee (1811–1886), he is a member of the Livingston family and a direct descendant of Robert Livingston, the 1st Lord of Livingston Manor. His second cousin was Henry Yates Satterlee (1843–1908), the first Episcopal Bishop of Washington, D.C.

Satterlee graduated with a B.S. from Columbia College in 1883, received his M.A. in 1884, and completed his studies at Columbia Law School with a Ph.D. and LL.B. law degree in 1885.

== Career ==
Satterlee was admitted to the bar in New York in 1885, entering the office of Evarts, Choate and Beeman. During the Spanish–American War, he volunteered for duty in the Navy, serving as a lieutenant in the Navy Department in Washington, D.C.

Before and after the war, Satterlee pursued a successful law practice, focused primarily on corporate law and commercial law. In 1894, he co-founded Ward, Hayden & Satterlee. Later, he partnered with George Folger Canfield and Harlan Fiske Stone, around the 1907 death of their partner, William Nivison Wilmer (the firm had been known as Wilmer, Canfield and Stone). Tracy Voorhees joined the firm in 1917; he went on to become U.S. Army Under Secretary after the Second World War. Satterlee, Canfield & Stone was a predecessor of the present-day firm Satterlee Stephens Burke & Burke LLP.

In 1908, President Theodore Roosevelt nominated Satterlee as Assistant Secretary of the Navy. Satterlee held this office from December 3, 1908, to March 5, 1909. He served as President of The Union League Club from 1938 - 1939.

Satterlee authored several books, including a 1939 biography of his father-in-law entitled J. Pierpont Morgan: An Intimate Portrait.

== Personal life ==
On November 15, 1900, he married Louisa Pierpont Morgan (1866–1946), the oldest daughter of J. Pierpont Morgan. In 1910, Satterlee and his wife purchased the Sotterley Plantation in Hollywood, Maryland. Together, they were the parents of two daughters:

- Mabel Morgan Satterlee (1901–1993), who married Francis Abbott Ingalls II (b. 1895), brother of Laura Ingalls, in 1925.
- Eleanor Morgan Satterlee (1905–1951), who married Milo Sargent Gibbs, the son of Milo Delavan Gibbs, in 1929. They divorced shortly after.

Louisa died at their summer home, Dover House, in the Round Hill district of Greenwich, Connecticut, on October 7, 1946. In failing health, Satterlee died by suicide with a pistol shot through his right temple at his apartment at 1 Beekman Place in Manhattan, New York City on July 14, 1947, at the age of 83.

Government offices
Preceded by Truman Handy Newberry	Assistant Secretary of the Navy; December 3, 1908 – March 5, 1909	Succeeded by Beekman Winthrop
