= Robert Winthrop (banker) =

American businessman (1833–1892)

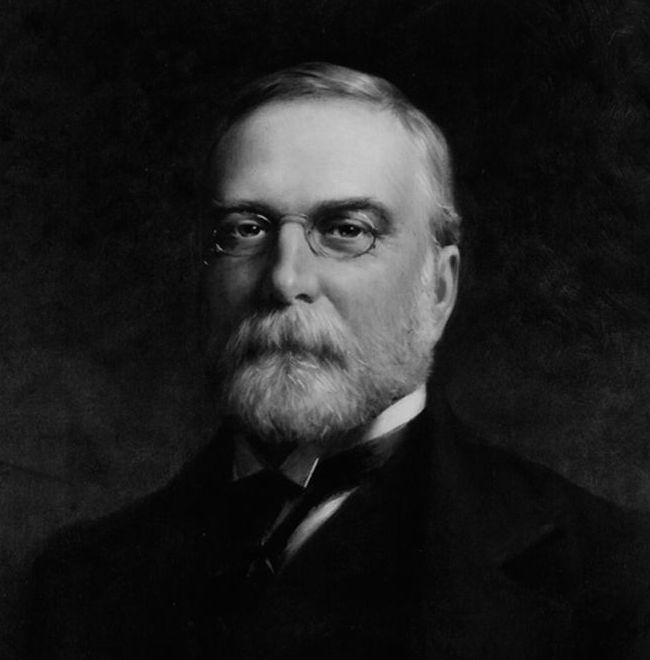
- Painting of Winthrop by Théobald Chartran, c. 1880
- Born: April 18, 1833
- Died: November 18, 1892 (aged 59); New York City
- Resting place: Green-Wood Cemetery
- Occupation: Banker
- Spouse: Katherine Wilson Taylor (m. 1859)
- Children: 6, including Grenville and Beekman
- Relatives: Frederick Winthrop (brother); Robert Kean (grandson); Herman van Roijen (grandson)

Robert Winthrop (April 18, 1833 – November 18, 1892) was a wealthy banker and capitalist in New York City.

== Early life ==
Winthrop was born on April 18, 1833, to Thomas Charles Winthrop (1797–1873) and Georgianna (Kane) Winthrop. His brother was Civil War General Frederick Winthrop. Their ancestors included colonial governors John Winthrop, John Winthrop Jr., and Fitz-John Winthrop.

== Career ==
Robert Winthrop commenced his business career in the cotton and sugar business with J.&A. Dennistoun Wood. In 1859, he turned to banking with the firm of Read, & Drexel. He was admitted to the New York Stock Exchange in 1862. In 1863, he became a one-third owner in the firm of Drexel, Winthrop & Company.

Drexel, Winthrop was a very successful firm during the 1860s. most of this time, this New York branch, combined with the Drexel’s Philadelphia branch, was profiting between $300,000 and $350,000 per year. The Drexel brothers had a desire to do more European investing, as Winthrop did not agree, Drexel, Winthrop was dissolved in 1871 and Robert Winthrop & Company was established.

Over the next twenty years, this company would grow into an important family banking enterprise; Robert Winthrop multiplied his family’s fortune many times over. The Company would remain in the Winthrop family’s hands for over one hundred years. In 1977, Wood, Struthers, & Winthrop, the successor firm of Robert Winthrop & Company, was sold to Donaldson, Lufkin & Jenrette for one-million shares of DLJ stock. DLJ went on to become part of Credit Suisse.

Robert Winthrop was considered a close associate of his father-in-law, Moses Taylor. By the late 1860s, Mr. and Mrs. Robert Winthrop were large holders of the Manhattan Gas Light Company with 240 shares. In 1873, they held 1,320 shares of the Delaware, Lackawanna and Western Railroad. In 1870, Winthrop was a director of The Manhattan Coal Company. The extent of the Robert Winthrop family wealth would be further revealed during the Pujo Committee investigations. In 1913, a report issued by the Taft Administration showed that Mrs. Robert Winthrop was the third largest shareholder of National City Bank of New York, while Robert Winthrop & Company was the sixth largest shareholder in the National Bank of Commerce of New York. These were the nation’s two largest banks at the time. His son, Beekman Winthrop, headed Robert Winthrop and Company from 1913 until 1939 and served as a director of National City Bank.

In 1883, Robert Winthrop was an original shareholder of the Real Estate Exchange and Auction Room in New York when he purchased $10,000 of the original $115,000 subscribed. Other original shareholders included John Jacob Astor III, William Astor, and Lloyd Aspinwall. Winthrop served as a trustee of the New York Life Insurance and Trust Company and the Orthopedic Hospital.

=== Society life ===
Socially, Robert Winthrop belonged to the Union, Knickerbocker, Riding, and Metropolitan Clubs. Winthrop was a friend, neighbor, and business associate of Theodore Roosevelt, Sr., father of United States President Theodore Roosevelt. The Winthrop and Roosevelt families would remain close through the next generation as Robert Winthrop’s son, Beekman Winthrop, would serve as Governor of Puerto Rico and Assistant Secretary of the Treasury during Roosevelt's Administration.

== Personal life ==
On June 23, 1859, Winthrop was married to Kate Wilson Taylor (1839–1925). She was the daughter of Moses Taylor, who was one of the greatest railroad, iron, and coal company financiers and was president of National City Bank for 27 years. They had six children who lived to adulthood:

- Robert Dudley Winthrop (1861–1912), a Harvard graduate and banker who did not marry.
- Grenville Lindall Winthrop (1864–1943), who accumulated one of the largest and most valuable private art collections in the United States, which he bequeathed to the Fogg Art Museum at Harvard University upon his death in 1943.
- Katharine Taylor Winthrop (1866–1943), who married U.S. Senator Hamilton Fish Kean, a son of Col. John Kean.
- Frederic Bayard Winthrop (1868–1932), who married Dorothy Amory (d. 1907) in 1903. After her death, he married Sarah Barroll Thayer (1885–1938), the daughter of Nathaniel Thayer III, in 1911.
- Albertina Taylor Winthrop (1871–1934), who married Dutch diplomat Jan Herman van Roijen.
- Beekman Winthrop (1874–1940), who served in the Taft Administration and from 1909 to 1913, was Assistant Secretary of the Navy. He married Melza Riggs Wood (1870-1928).

Winthrop died on November 18, 1892, at his home, 38 East 37th Street in New York City and his funeral was held at Grace Church in Manhattan.

=== Descendants ===
Through his daughter Katharine, Winthrop was the grandfather of U.S. Congressman Robert Winthrop Kean (1893–1980), grandfather of Governor of New Jersey and 9/11 Commission Chairman Thomas Howard Kean Sr. (b. 1935), and 2x great-grandfather of U.S. representative Thomas Kean Jr. (b. 1968). It was the Winthrop-Taylor fortune that kept the Kean family afloat in tough economic times. Winthrop-Taylor monies were lent to the Kean’s during the Panic of 1907, during the Great Depression to recapitalize Kean, Taylor and National State Bank of Elizabeth, and once again upon the death of Hamilton Fish Kean in 1941 to keep Kean, Taylor in existence.

Among Robert Winthrop’s descendants, Robert Winthrop (1904–1999), who headed Robert Winthrop & Company, and Wood, Struthers, & Winthrop from 1939 until 1969 and was the majority partner upon its sale in 1977. Frederic Winthrop (1906–1979) was a gentleman farmer who presided over his 600-acre (2.4 km^{2}) estate in Hamilton and Ipswich, Massachusetts. Frederic Winthrop was the father of five sons including Grant Forbes Winthrop who is a partner at Milbank, & Winthrop, a private investment firm in New York City. Through his marriage, Frederic Winthrop was the uncle of U.S. Senator John F. Kerry. The Winthrop cousins also jointly own a 23,000-acre (93 km^{2}) plantation in Allendale County, South Carolina, called Groton Plantation. The plantation is today the site of ongoing conservation efforts through game management, and the land remains a token of beautiful low country South Carolina.
