= William H. Dillingham =

American politician and lawyer (1791–1854)

Member of the Pennsylvania House of Representatives from the Chester County district
- In office 1838–1838

Personal details
- Born: August 3, 1791 Lee, Massachusetts, U.S.
- Died: December 11, 1854 (aged 63) Philadelphia, Pennsylvania, U.S.
- Spouse: Christina Brinton (m. 1823)
- Education: Williams College
- Occupation: Politician; lawyer; writer

William H. Dillingham (August 3, 1791 – December 11, 1854) was an American politician and lawyer from Pennsylvania. He was a member of the Pennsylvania House of Representatives, representing Chester County, in 1838.

== Early life ==
William H. Dillingham was born on August 3, 1791, in Lee, Massachusetts, to Rebecca (née Fessenden) and Nathan Dillingham. He attended Lenox Academy. At the age of 15, he entered Williams College as a sophomore, but did not graduate. In 1808, he read law with Charles Chauncey of Philadelphia and was admitted to the bar in 1811.

== Career ==
While in Philadelphia in 1814, Dillingham was a private soldier of the Washington Guards. He was honorably discharged and continued to practice law in Philadelphia. In 1817, Dillingham moved to West Chester, Pennsylvania, to work as a lawyer. In 1821, he was appointed prosecuting attorney. He remained in that role until 1823. He worked as solicitor of the Bank of Chester County for more than 15 years. He was one of the founders and principal manager of the Chester County Athenaeum. He was a trustee of West Chester Academy for 17 years.

Dillingham was a member of the Chester County Cabinet of Natural Science for almost 20 years. In July 1843, he was elected a member of the American Philosophical Society. He wrote essays to leading journals of the time and spoke in front of groups, including the Chester County Cabinet of Natural Science and the Chester County Horticultural Society.

In 1837, Dillingham was elected to the Pennsylvania House of Representatives, representing Chester County. In 1841, he moved to Philadelphia. From 1846 to 1852, he was counsel for the Bank of Pennsylvania.

== Personal life ==
In May 1823, Dillingham married Christina Brinton, daughter of Joseph H. Brinton.

Dillingham died on December 11, 1854, in Philadelphia.

== Awards ==
In 1815, he received an honorary degree of Master of Arts from Williams College.
