= Lenox Academy =

- U.S. National Register of Historic Places
- U.S. Historic district – Contributing property
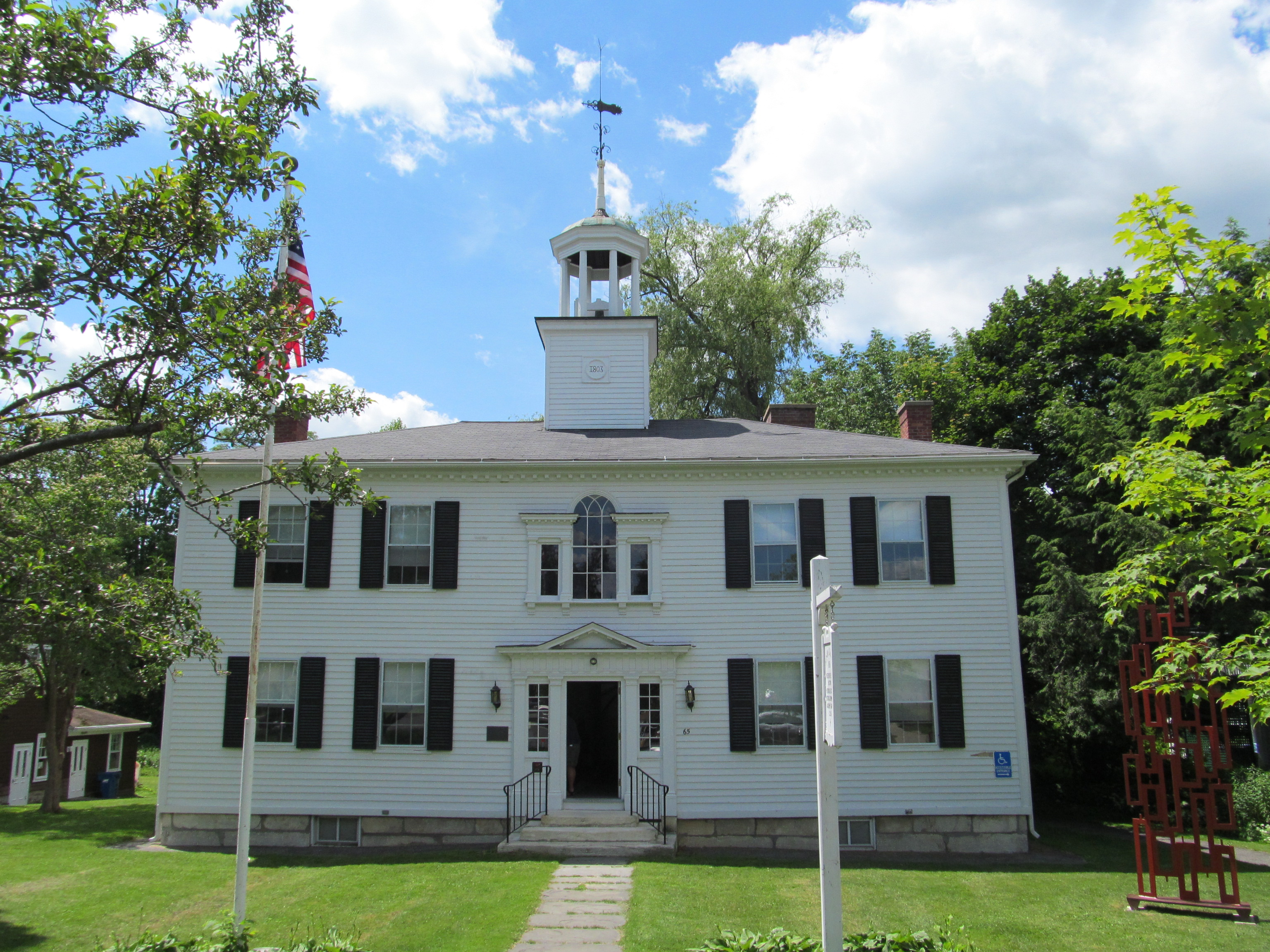

- Location within Massachusetts Location within the United States
- Location: 65 Main St., Lenox, Massachusetts
- Coordinates: 42°21′32″N 73°17′5″W
- Area: less than one acre
- Built: 1802-1803
- Architect: Lewis, Eldad
- Architectural style: Federal
- Part of: Lenox Village Historic District (ID100006987)
- NRHP reference No.: 82001895

Significant dates
- Added to NRHP: September 30, 1982
- Designated CP: June 27, 2022

Lenox Academy is a historic school building at 65 Main Street in Lenox, Massachusetts. Built in 1802-03 as a private academy, it was the first secondary school to open in Berkshire County. It was subsequently used as the town's high school, and now houses offices. It was listed on the National Register of Historic Places in 1982.

== Description and history ==
The former Lenox Academy building stands on the western edge of the commercial center of Lenox, on the west side of Main Street between Sunset and Cliffwood Streets. It is a two-story wood-frame structure, with a hip roof and clapboarded exterior. The hip roof is truncated and topped at the center by a two-stage belfry. The main facade is five bays wide, with sash windows in the outer bays. The center bay has the main entrance on the ground floor, flanked by wide sidelight windows, with pilasters between windows and door, and on the outside of the entry surround. The pilasters rise to an entablature and projecting cornice with a gable peak at the center. Above the entrance is a Palladian window, its side windows also articulated by pilasters and crowned by a corniced entablature.

The Federal style building was constructed in 1803 and the school incorporated the same year. The structure house a private academy until 1866. It served as the town's public high school from 1869 to 1879, at which time it was closed for repairs and renovations. In 1888 it again began to serve as the high school, a role it fulfilled until 1908. A private school, the Trinity School, used the property from 1911 until the 1920s, when that school failed.

The building then sat vacant and deteriorated, until the defunct academy, under threat of demolition, was turned over to the town for preservation. It now serves as an office building for local civic groups.

== Notable alumni ==
- William H. Dillingham, Pennsylvania state politician and lawyer

== See also ==
- National Register of Historic Places listings in Berkshire County, Massachusetts
