= Beekman Winthrop =

American lawyer, banker and government official (1874–1940)

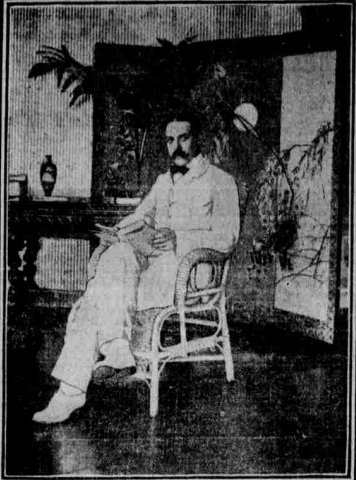
- Winthrop, c. 1904

11th Assistant Secretary of the Navy
- In office March 6, 1909 – March 16, 1913
- President: William Howard Taft Woodrow Wilson
- Preceded by: Herbert L. Satterlee
- Succeeded by: Franklin D. Roosevelt

Assistant Secretary of the Treasury
- In office 1907–1909
- President: Theodore Roosevelt
- Preceded by: Herbert Livingston Satterlee
- Succeeded by: Charles D. Hilles

Governor of Puerto Rico
- In office July 4, 1904 – April 17, 1907
- President: Theodore Roosevelt
- Preceded by: William Henry Hunt
- Succeeded by: Regis Henri Post

Personal details
- Born: September 18, 1874 Orange, New Jersey
- Died: November 10, 1940 (aged 66) New York City, New York, U.S.
- Party: Republican
- Spouse: Melza Riggs Wood (m. 1903; died 1928)
- Profession: Lawyer

Beekman Winthrop (September 18, 1874 – November 10, 1940) was an American lawyer, government official and banker. He served as the governor of Puerto Rico from 1904 to 1907, as assistant secretary of the Treasury in 1907–1909, and assistant secretary of the Navy in 1909–1913.

== Early life ==
The son of Robert Winthrop and Kate Wilson Taylor, Beekman "Beek" Winthrop came from a family of wealth and influence in New York. He was born in Orange, New Jersey, and attended Harvard University in Cambridge, Massachusetts, where he received a Bachelor of Arts (A.B.) degree in 1897 and a LL.B degree from Harvard Law School in 1900, graduating second in his class.

== Career ==
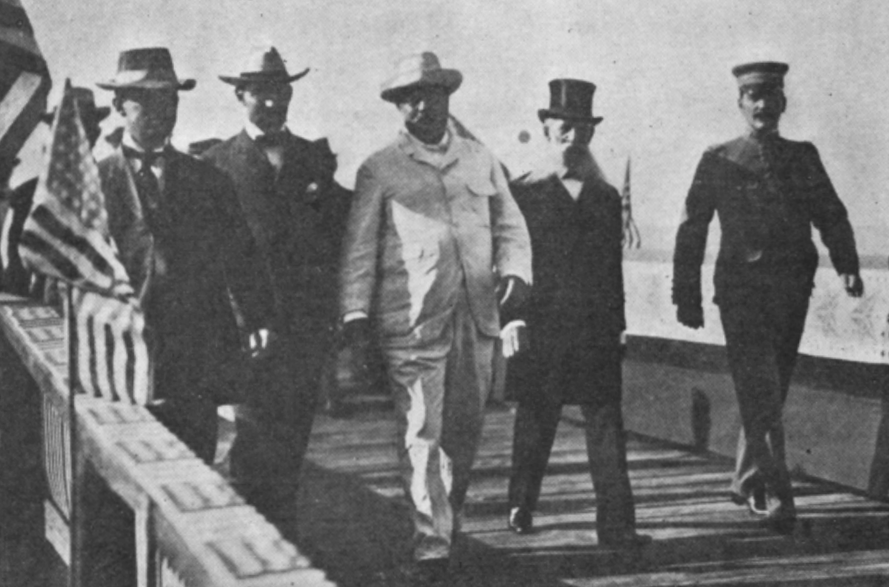
Theodore Roosevelt and Winthrop (fourth from right) in Ponce, Puerto Rico, November 21, 1906

A descendant of both John Winthrop, first Governor of Massachusetts, and John Winthrop, the Younger, first Governor of Connecticut, immediately after graduating he became a personal secretary to future president William Howard Taft while Taft was Governor-General of the Philippines. Winthrop was soon promoted to Assistant Executive Secretary of the Philippines (1901–1903) and was appointed as a Judge of the Court of First Instance, Philippine Islands (1903–1904). He was known to be a personal friend of Theodore Roosevelt and was appointed by him in 1904 as Governor and General Commander of Puerto Rico, at age 28. He was confirmed by the Congress. Melza Riggs Wood (1870–1928), four years his senior, whom he married in 1903, became the First Lady of Puerto Rico.

Winthrop took oath as governor of Puerto Rico on July 4, 1904, and served until April 17, 1907. On his inauguration, he promised improvements to the educational system of Puerto Rico. Winthrop was a proponent of bringing citizenship and locally elected officials to Puerto Rico system of governance. The press reported favorably on Winthrop's activities, and reporters were especially impressed with Mrs. Winthrop's fluency in Spanish, which made her popular among local population.

In 1907, Winthrop was appointed as Assistant Secretary of the Treasury. In 1909, he was made Assistant Secretary of the Navy, a post he retained, functioning in time of need as Acting Secretary, until 1913, when he was succeeded by a young New Yorker, Franklin D. Roosevelt.

== Later life ==
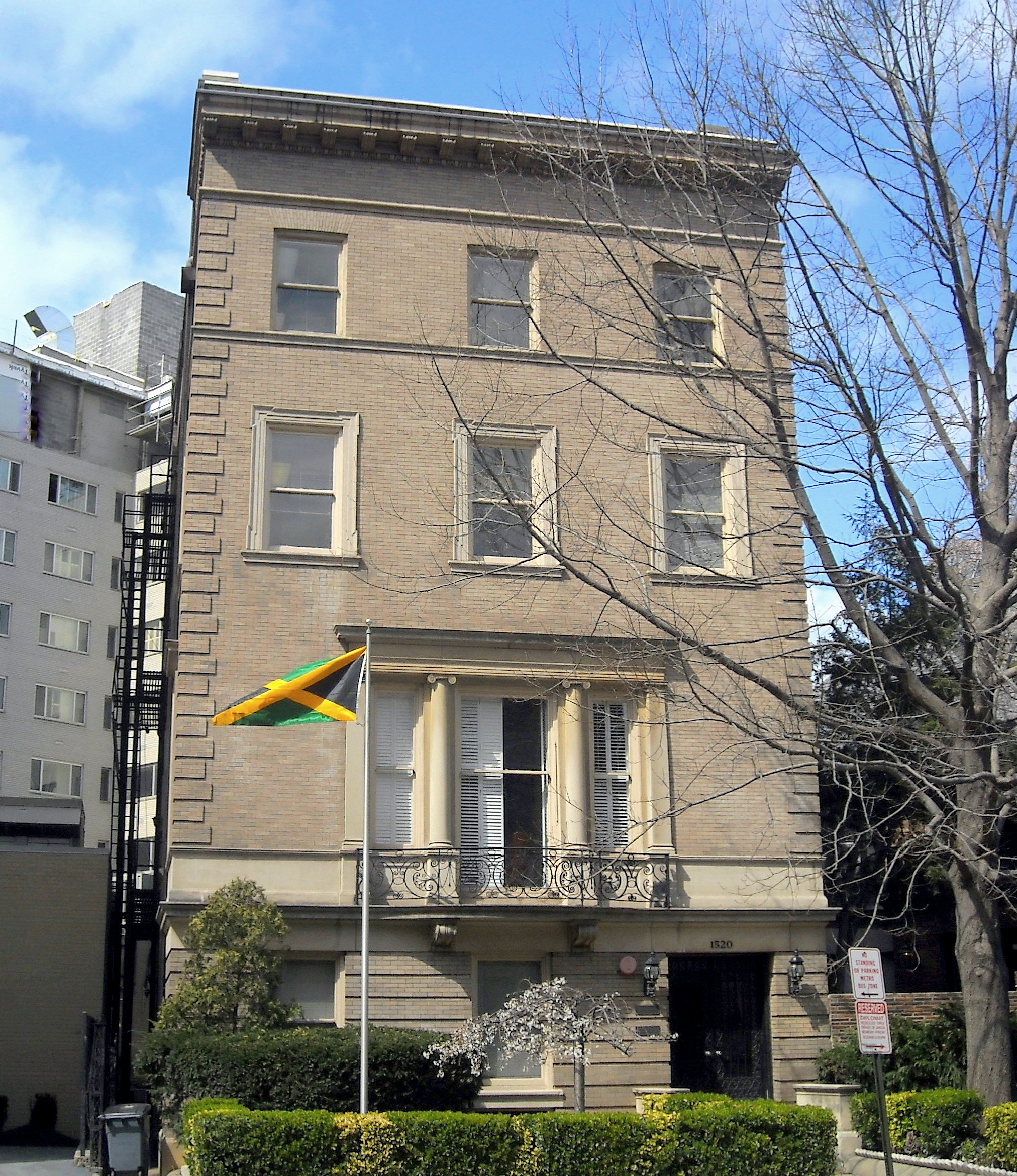
Former residence of Beekman Winthrop in Washington, D.C.

Following his retirement from public service in 1913, he was a director of National City Bank. He resigned from the bank in 1916. He subsequently became a senior partner of Robert Winthrop & Co. in New York, from which capacity he stepped down in 1939. At the end of his life he lived in New York on East 69th Street, where he died on November 10, 1940. He is buried at Green-Wood Cemetery.

The Winthrops did not have children, however, Nathaniel Thayer Winthrop, a son of Frederic Bayard Winthrop, named his son, Beekman Winthrop (1941–2014) to honor his uncle.

Government offices
Preceded by William Henry Hunt	Governor of Puerto Rico; July 4, 1904 – April 17, 1907	Succeeded by Regis Henri Post
Preceded by Herbert L. Satterlee	Assistant Secretary of the Navy; March 6, 1909 – March 16, 1913	Succeeded by Franklin D. Roosevelt
