= Aubrey Beardsley =

English illustrator and author (1872–1898)

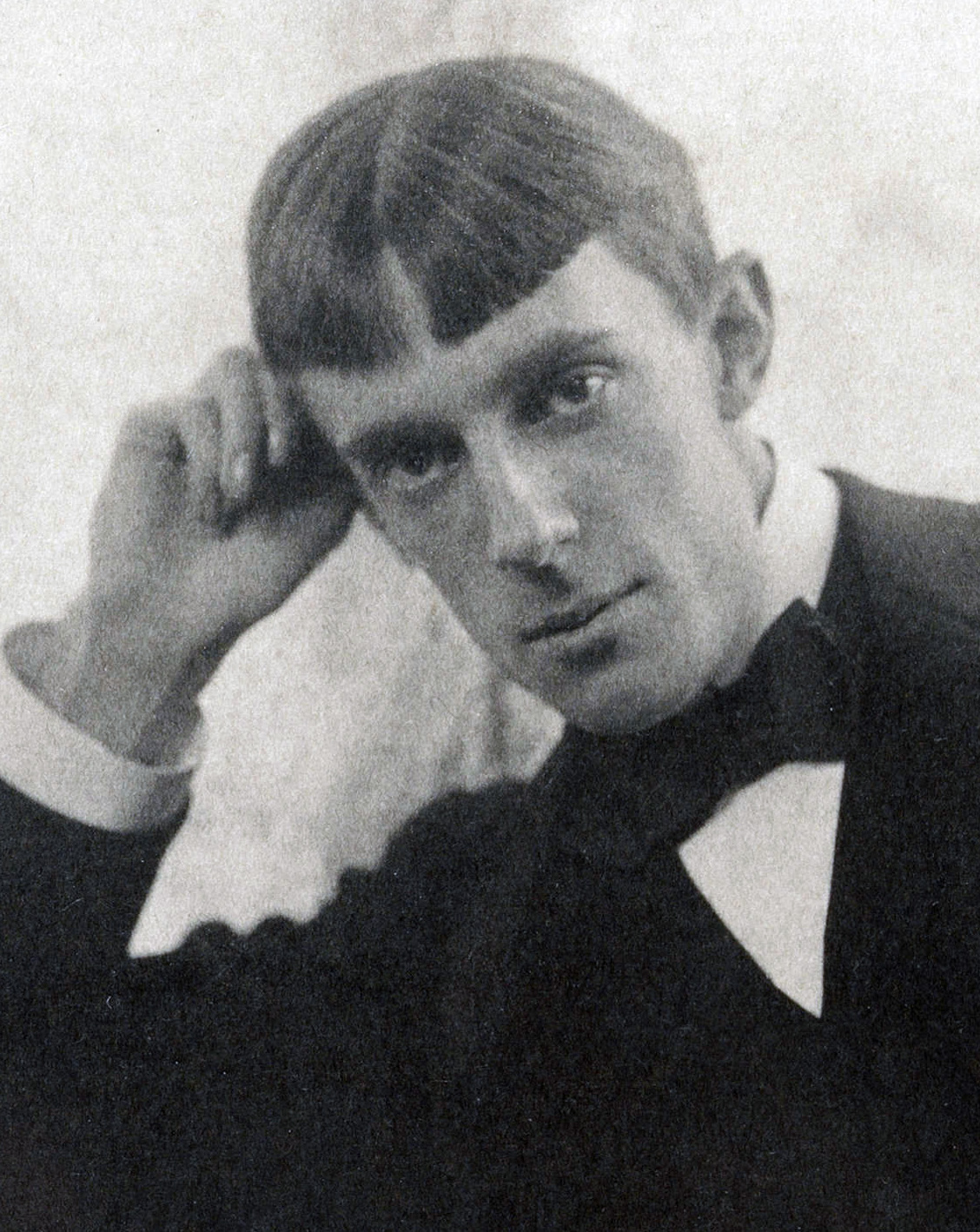
- Portrait by Frederick Hollyer, 1893
- Born: Aubrey Vincent Beardsley; 21 August 1872; Brighton, Sussex, England
- Died: 16 March 1898 (aged 25); Menton, France
- Resting place: Cimetière du Vieux-Château, Menton, France
- Education: Westminster School of Art
- Known for: Illustration, graphics/graphic arts
- Notable work: The Climax
- Movement: Art Nouveau, aestheticism

Aubrey Vincent Beardsley (/ˈbɪərdzli/ BEERDZ-lee; 21 August 1872 – 16 March 1898) was an English illustrator and author. His black ink drawings were influenced by Japanese woodcuts, and depicted the grotesque, the decadent, and the erotic. He was a leading figure in the aesthetic movement, which also included Oscar Wilde and James McNeill Whistler. Beardsley's contribution to the development of the Art Nouveau and poster styles was significant despite his early death from tuberculosis. He is one of the important Modern Style figures.

== Early life, education, and early career ==
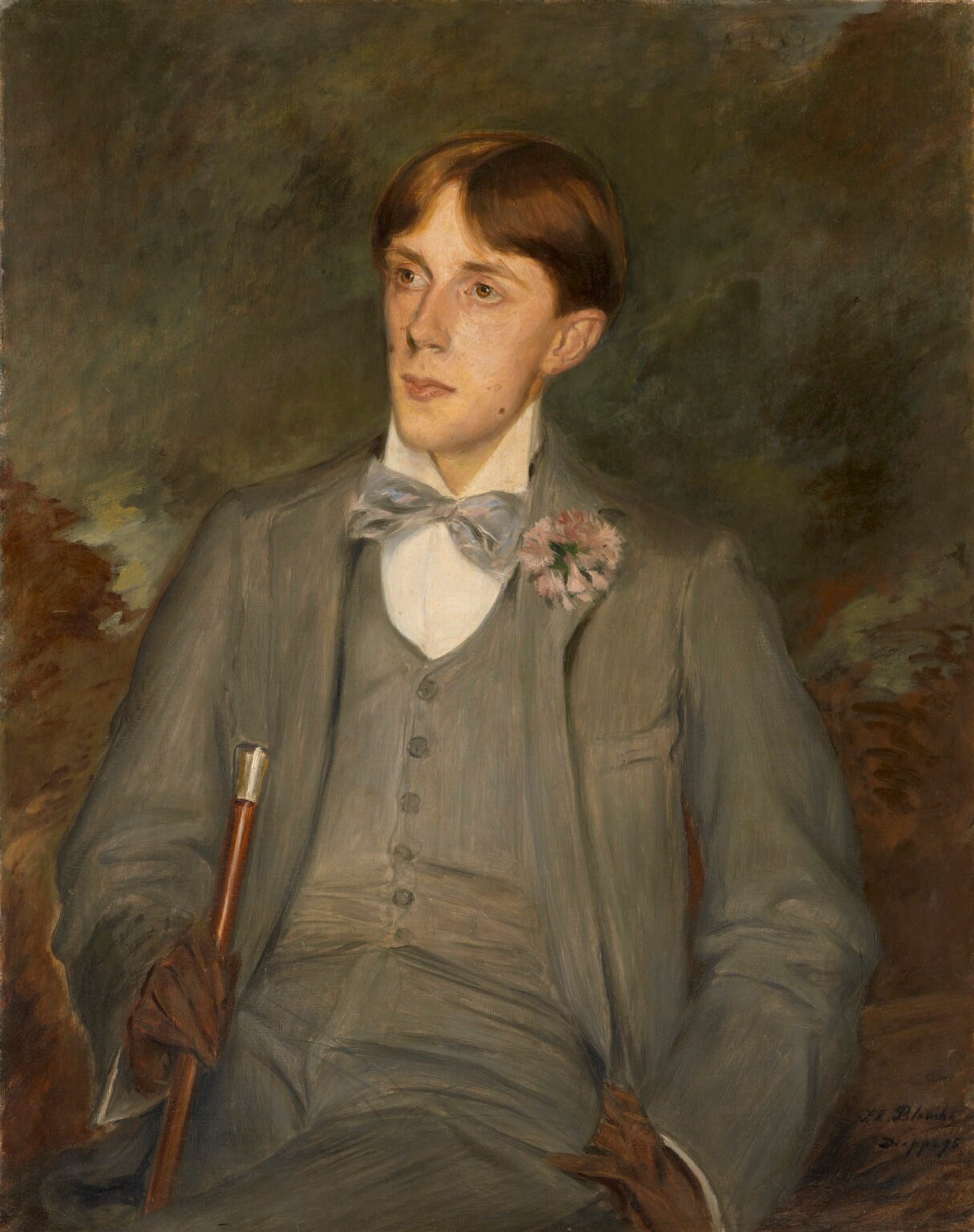
Aubrey Beardsley by Jacques-Émile Blanche, oil on canvas, 1895 (National Portrait Gallery, London)

Beardsley was born in Brighton, Sussex, England, on 21 August 1872 and christened on 24 October 1872. His father, Vincent Paul Beardsley (1839–1909), was the son of a Clerkenwell jeweller; Vincent had no trade himself (partly owing to tuberculosis, from which his own father had died aged only 40), and relied on a private income from an inheritance that he received from his maternal grandfather, a property developer, when he was 21. Vincent's wife, Ellen Agnus Pitt (1846–1932), was the daughter of Surgeon-Major William Pitt of the Indian Army. The Pitts were a well-established and respected family in Brighton, and Beardsley's mother married a man of lesser social status than might have been expected. Soon after their wedding, Vincent was obliged to sell some of his property in order to settle a claim for his breach of promise of marriage from another woman, the widow of a clergyman, who claimed that he had promised to marry her. At the time of his birth, Beardsley's family, which included his sister Mabel who was one year older, were living in Ellen's familial home at 12 Buckingham Road. At the age of seven, Beardsley contracted tuberculosis.

With the loss of Vincent Beardsley's fortune soon after his son's birth, the family settled in London in 1883, where Vincent would work first for the West India & Panama Telegraph Company, then irregularly as a clerk at breweries; they would spend the next 20 years in rented accommodation, battling poverty. Ellen took to presenting herself as the "victim of a mésalliance". In 1884, Aubrey appeared in public as an "infant musical phenomenon", playing at several concerts with his sister. In January 1885, he began to attend Brighton, Hove and Sussex Grammar School, where he spent the next four years. His first poems, drawings, and cartoons appeared in print in Past and Present, the school's magazine. In 1888, he obtained a post in an architect's office and afterwards one in the Guardian Life and Fire Insurance Company. In 1891, under the advice of Sir Edward Burne-Jones and Pierre Puvis de Chavannes, he took up art as a profession. In 1892, he attended the classes at the Westminster School of Art, then under Professor Fred Brown.

== Work ==
Beardsley travelled to Paris in 1892, where he discovered the poster art of Henri de Toulouse-Lautrec and the Parisian fashion for Japanese prints. His first commission was Le Morte d'Arthur by Thomas Malory (1893), illustrated for the publishing house J.M. Dent and Company. In 1894, a new translation of Lucian's True History, with illustrations by Beardsley, William Strang, and J. B. Clark, was privately printed in an edition of 251 copies.

Beardsley had six years of creative output, which can be divided into several periods, identified by the form of his signature. In the early period, his work is mostly unsigned. During 1891 and 1892, he progressed to using his initials A.V.B. In mid-1892, the period of Le Morte d'Arthur and The Bon Mots, he used a Japanese-influenced mark that became progressively more graceful, sometimes accompanied by A.B. in block capitals.

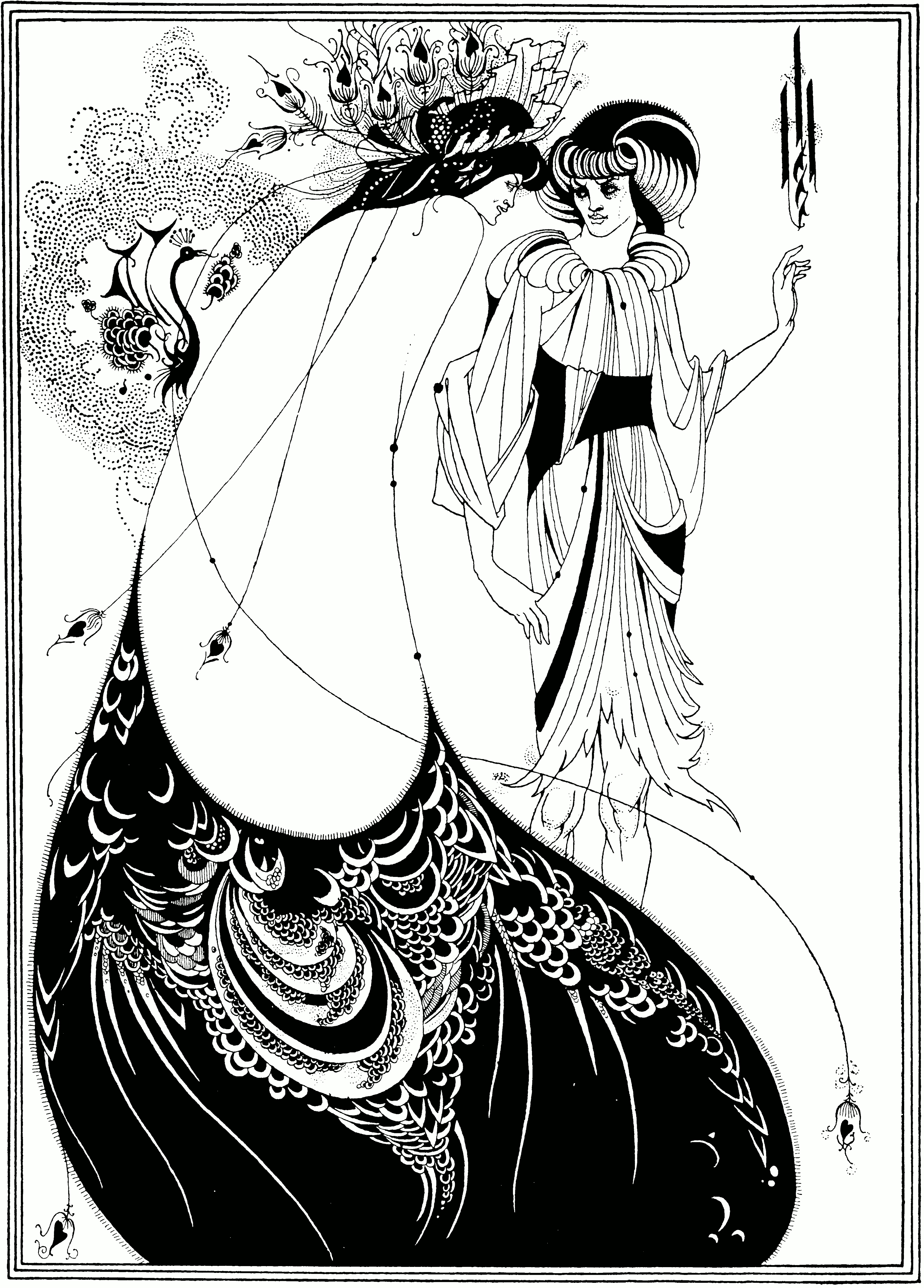
The Peacock Skirt, 1893

He co-founded The Yellow Book with American writer Henry Harland, and for the first four editions, he served as art editor and produced the cover designs and many illustrations for the magazine. He was aligned with Aestheticism, the British counterpart of Decadence and Symbolism. Most of his images are done in ink and feature large dark areas contrasted with large blank ones as well as areas of fine detail contrasted with areas with none at all.

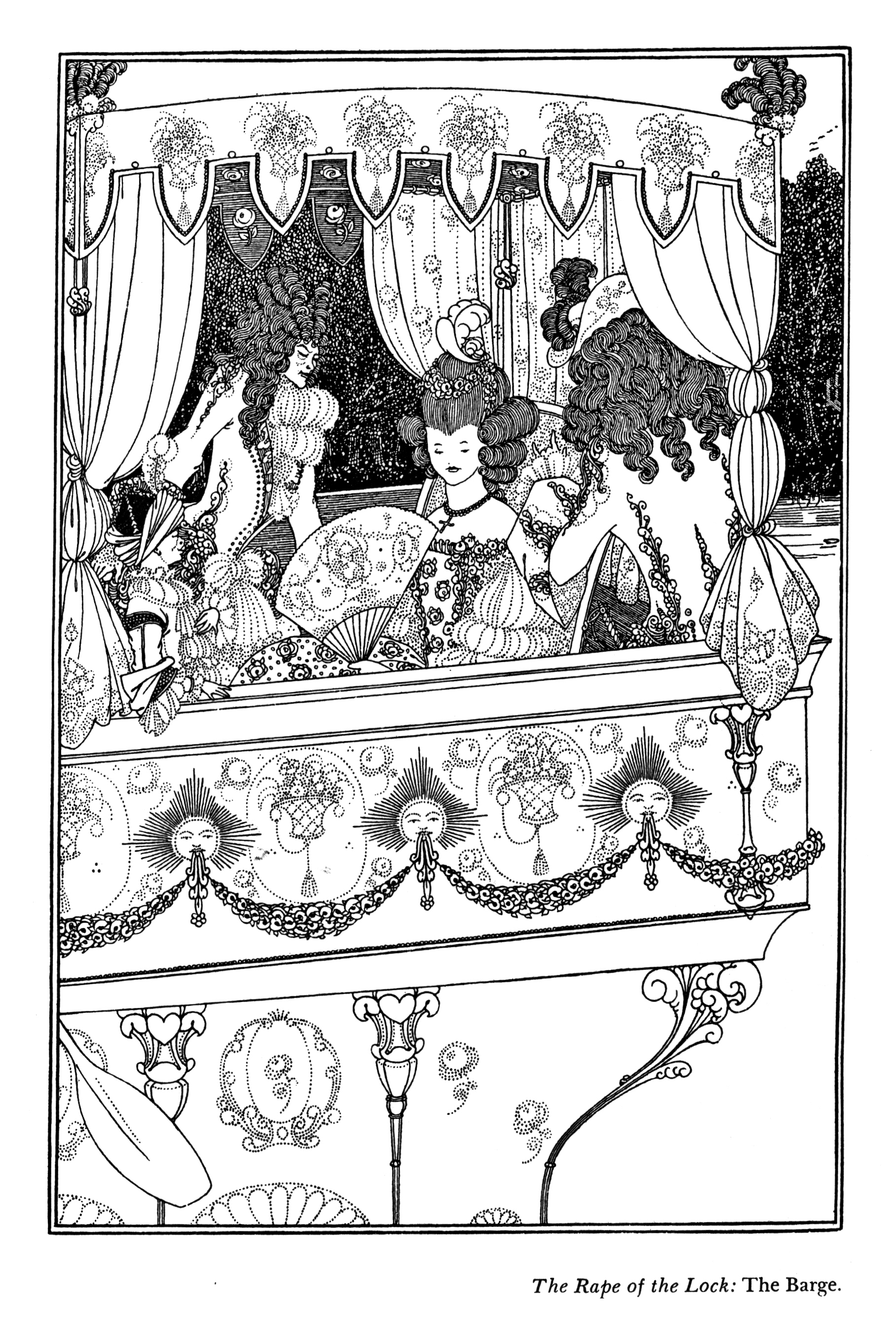
The Barge, illustration to The Rape of the Lock by Alexander Pope, 1896

Beardsley was the most controversial artist of the Art Nouveau era, renowned for his dark and perverse images and grotesque erotica, which were the main themes of his later work. He satirised Victorian values regarding sex, which at the time highly valued respectability, and men's fear of female superiority, as the women's movement made gains in economic rights and occupational and educational opportunities by the 1880s.

His illustrations were in black and white against a white background. Some of his drawings, inspired by Japanese shunga artwork, featured enormous genitalia. His most famous erotic illustrations concerned themes of history and mythology; these include his illustrations for a privately printed edition of Aristophanes' Lysistrata and his drawings for Oscar Wilde's play Salome, which eventually premiered in Paris in 1896. Other major illustration projects included an 1896 edition of The Rape of the Lock by Alexander Pope.

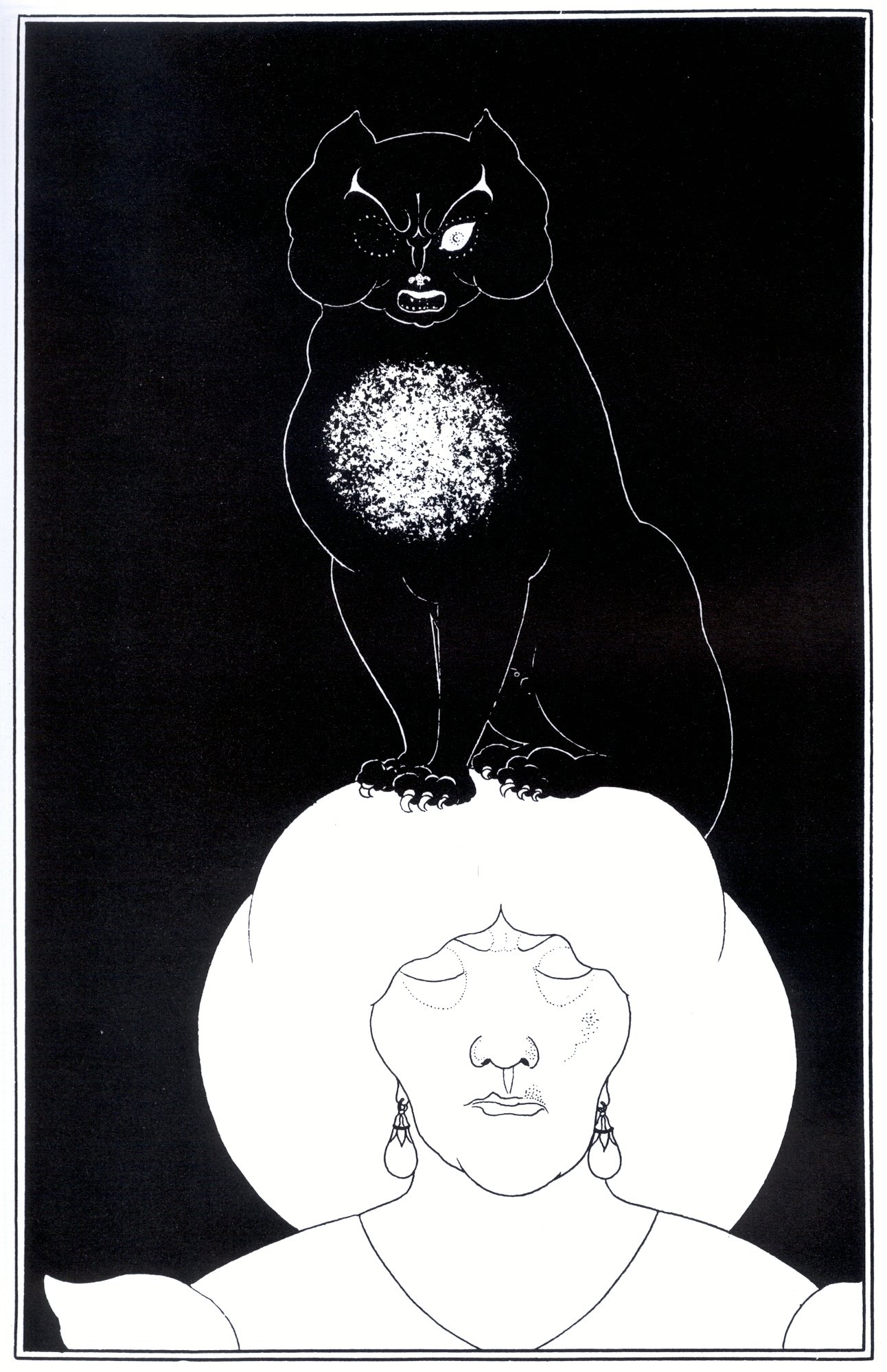
The Black Cat, 1894–5

He also produced extensive illustrations for books and magazines (e.g., for a deluxe edition of Sir Thomas Malory's Le Morte d'Arthur) and worked for magazines such as The Studio and The Savoy, of which he was a co-founder. As a co-founder of The Savoy, Beardsley was able to pursue his writing as well as illustration, and a number of his writings, including Under the Hill (a story based on the Tannhäuser legend) and "The Ballad of a Barber" appeared in the magazine.

Beardsley was a caricaturist and did some political cartoons, mirroring Wilde's irreverent wit in art. Beardsley's work reflected the decadence of his era and his influence was enormous, clearly visible in the work of the French Symbolists, the Poster Art Movement of the 1890s and the work of many later-period artists such as Frank C. Papé and Harry Clarke. In 1897 Leonard Smithers published some alleged works of Beardsley's in a book titled Fifty Drawings by Aubrey Beardsley, Selected from the Collection of Mr. H.S. Nicols. They were later discovered to be forgeries, distinguishable by their almost pornographic erotic elements rather than Beardsley's subtler use of sexuality.

Beardsley often hid obscene details in his work; publishers took to examining works with a magnifying glass before publication.

Beardsley's work continued to cause controversy in Britain long after his death. During an exhibition of Beardsley's prints held at the Victoria and Albert Museum in London in 1966, a private gallery in London was raided by the police for exhibiting copies of the same prints on display at the museum and the owner was charged under obscenity laws.

== Personal life ==
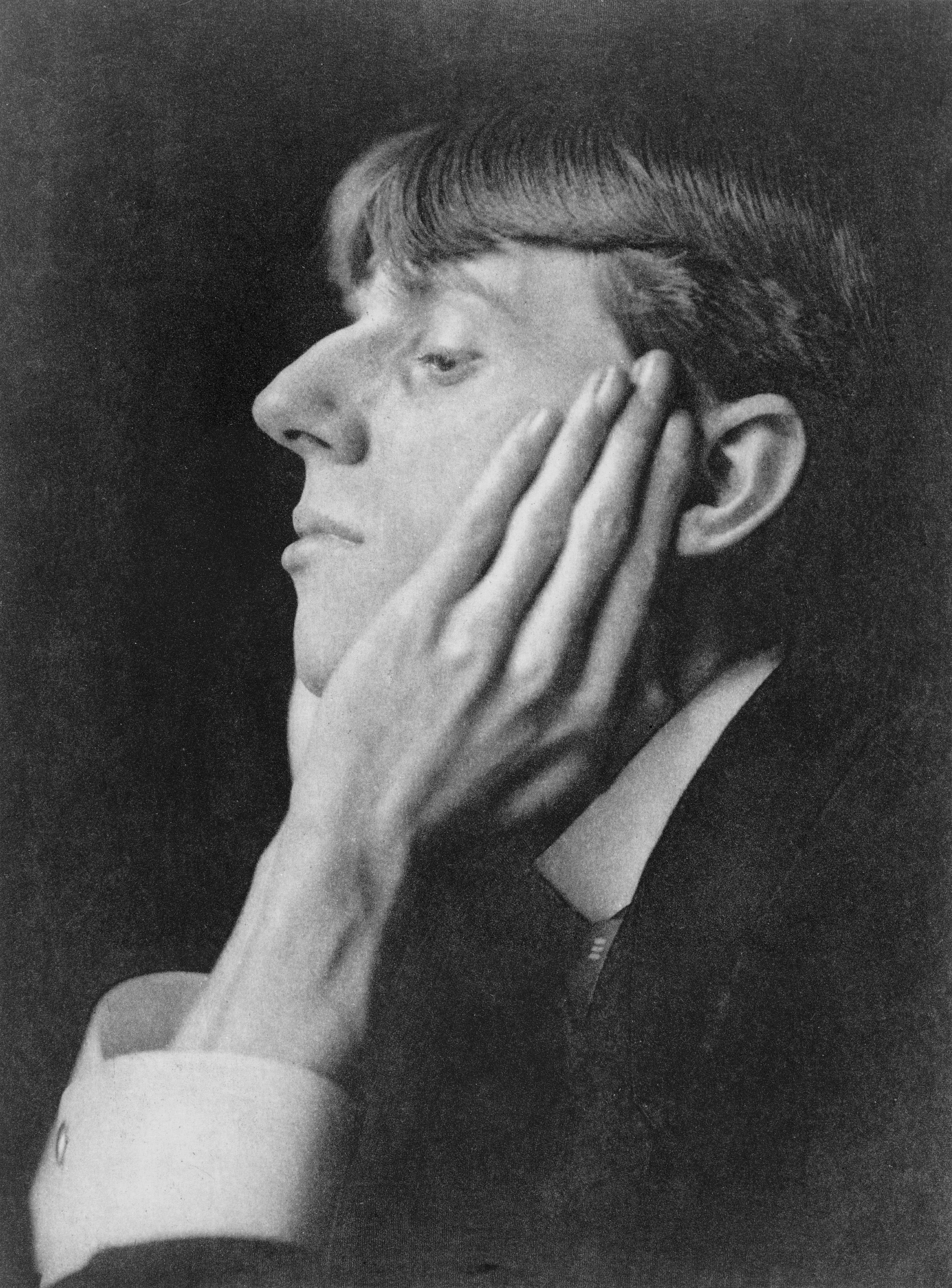
Aubrey Beardsley, photograph c. 1894–1895

Beardsley was a public as well as private eccentric. He said "I have one aim—the grotesque. If I am not grotesque, I am nothing." Wilde said Beardsley had "a face like a silver hatchet, and grass green hair". Beardsley was meticulous about his attire: dove-grey suits, hats, ties, and yellow gloves. He appeared at his publisher's in a morning coat and court shoes.

Although Beardsley was associated with the homosexual clique that included Oscar Wilde and other aesthetes, the details of his sexuality remain in question. In his Autobiographies, W. B. Yeats, who knew him well, says that he was not homosexual. Speculation about his sexuality includes rumours of an incestuous relationship with his elder sister, Mabel, who may have become pregnant by her brother and miscarried.

Contrary to the Victorian stereotype of Beardsley as purely morbid, decadent, or languid, Robbie Ross emphasised his underlying "briskness and virility" and his active and sharp engagement. He also specifically highlighted Beardsley's "delightful and engaging smile" which he offered freely to both strangers and friends, noting his fundamental courtesy and modesty that was almost the opposite of his public persona in Ross's "Beardsley" biography.

Ross recalled their first meeting on 14 February 1892: "He was shy, nervous, and self-conscious, without any of the intellectual assurance and ease so characteristic of him eighteen months later when his success was unquestioned." He then grew less shy after half an hour, becoming gayer and more talkative."

During his entire career, Beardsley had recurrent attacks of tuberculosis. He suffered frequent lung haemorrhages and often was unable to work or leave his home.

Beardsley converted to Catholicism in March 1897. The next year, the last letter before his death was to his publisher Leonard Smithers and close friend Herbert Charles Pollitt:

Postmark: March 7, 1898 | Jesus is our Lord and Judge | Dear Friend, I implore you to destroy all copies of Lysistrata and bad drawings … By all that is holy, all obscene drawings. | Aubrey Beardsley | In my death agony.

Both men ignored Beardsley's wishes, and Smithers actually continued to sell reproductions as well as forgeries of Beardsley's work.

== Death ==
In December 1896, Beardsley suffered a violent haemorrhage, leaving him in precarious health. By April 1897, a month after his conversion to Catholicism, his deteriorating health prompted a move to the French Riviera. He was primarily helped and cared by his mother, Ellen Beardsley, and his older sister, Mabel Beardsley, during his final illness in Menton, France. Financially, his greatest personal support came from the writer and patron Mac-André Raffalovich. He died of tuberculosis on 16 March 1898 at the Cosmopolitan Hotel (now the Résidence Mont Fleuri private apartments) in Menton, Alpes-Maritimes, attended by his mother and sister. He was 25 years old. Following a requiem Mass in Menton Cathedral the following day, his remains were interred in the Cimetière du Trabuquet.

== Media portrayals ==
In the 1982 Playhouse drama Aubrey, written by John Selwyn Gilbert, Beardsley was portrayed by actor John Dicks. The drama concerned Beardsley's life from the time of Oscar Wilde's arrest in April 1895, which caused Beardsley to lose his position at The Yellow Book, to his death from tuberculosis in 1898. The BBC documentary Beardsley and His Work was made in 1982. Beardsley is featured on the cover of The Beatles' Sgt. Pepper's Lonely Hearts Club Band. The 1977 horror film Death Bed: The Bed That Eats is narrated by the entombed spirit of an unnamed artist whose work and manner of death identify him as Beardsley.

In March 2020, BBC Four broadcast the hour-long documentary Scandal & Beauty: Mark Gatiss on Aubrey Beardsley, presented by Mark Gatiss. The programme coincided with the Beardsley exhibition at Tate Britain.

Beardsley's art is mentioned briefly in the 2011 version of the Car Seat Headrest song "Beach Life-in-Death".

== Legacy ==
In 2019 the National Leather Association International established an award named after Beardsley for creators of abstract erotic art.

== Gallery ==
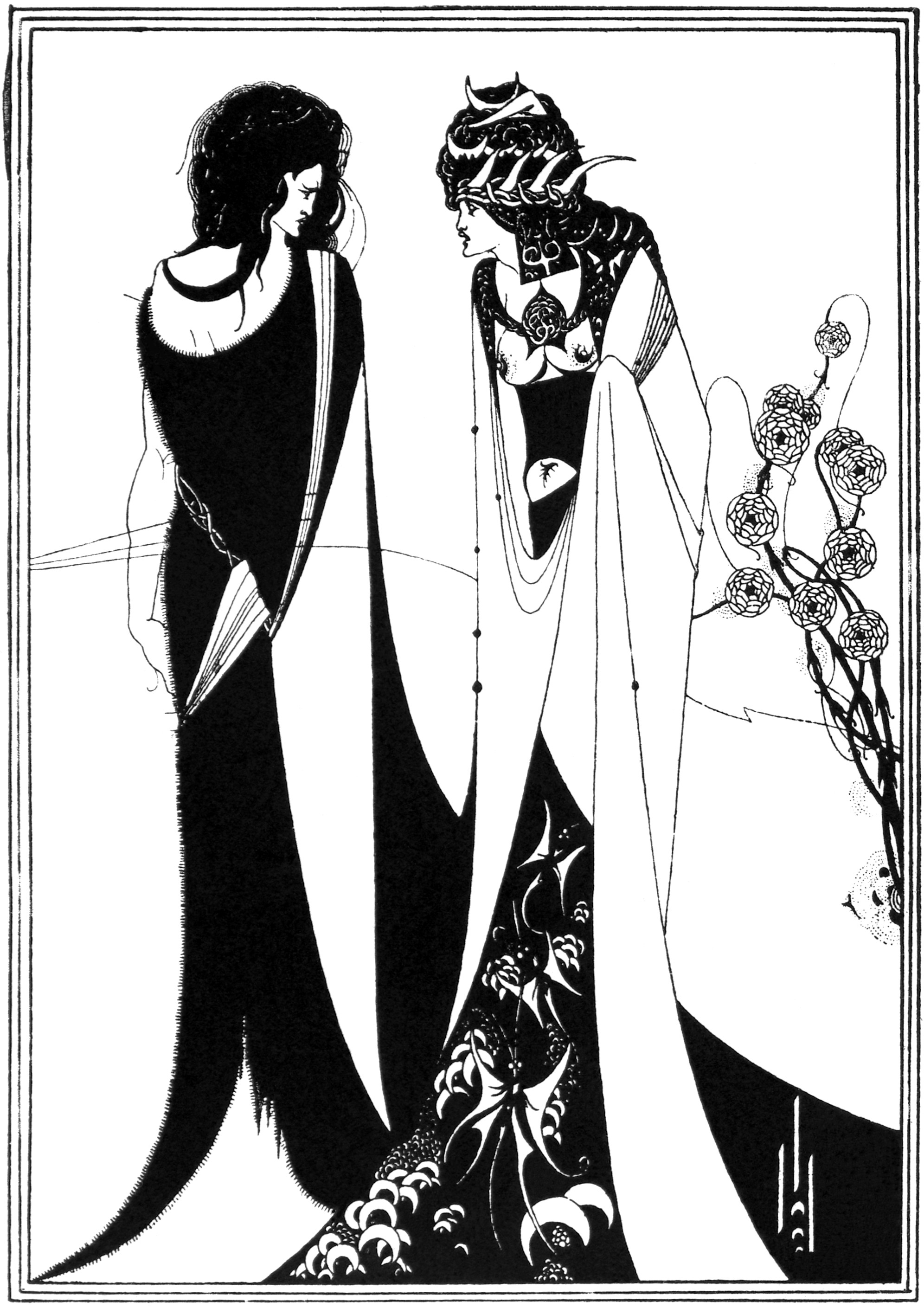
John the Baptist and Salome, 1893–4
(published 1907)

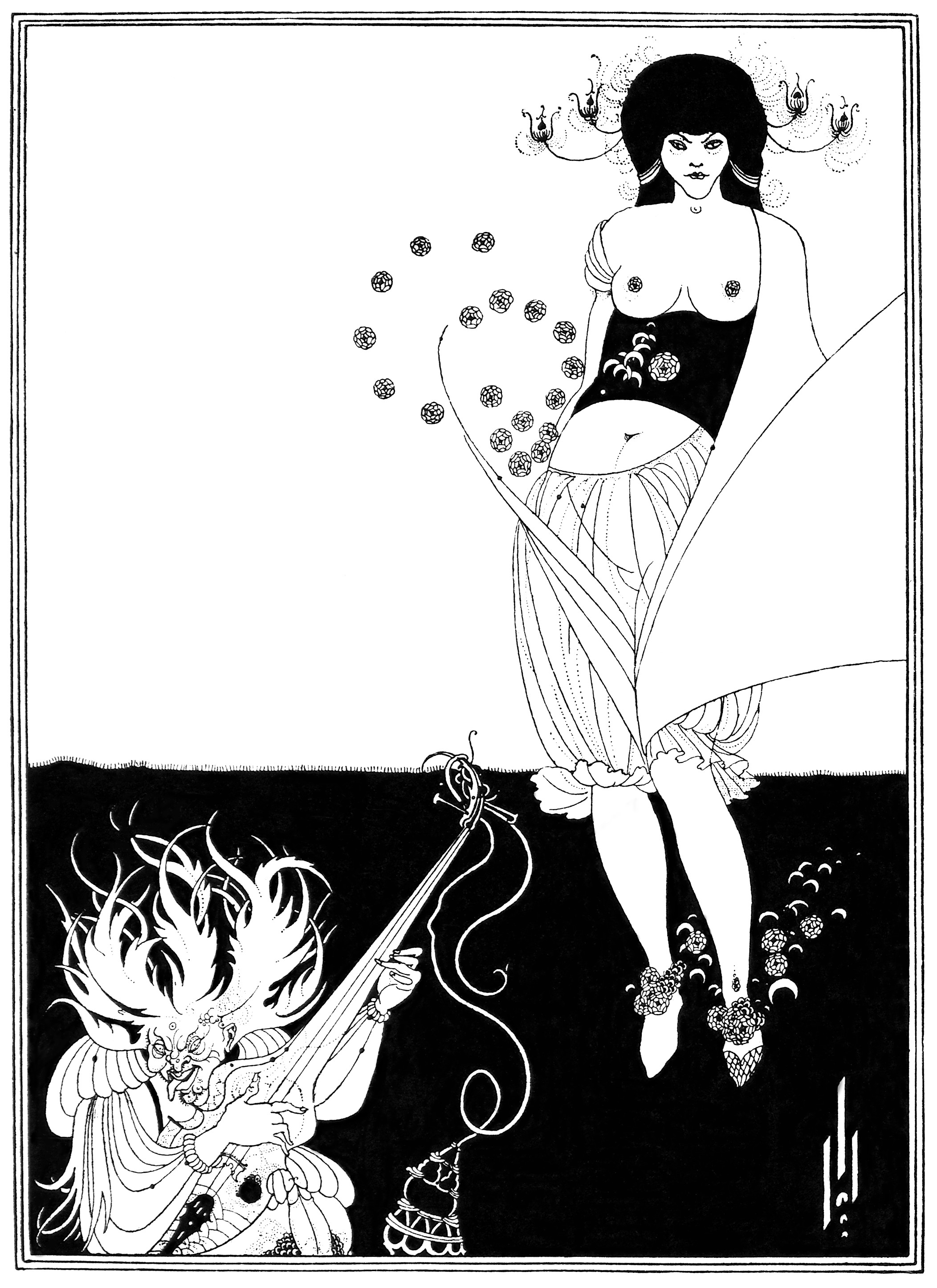
The Stomach Dance, 1893–4

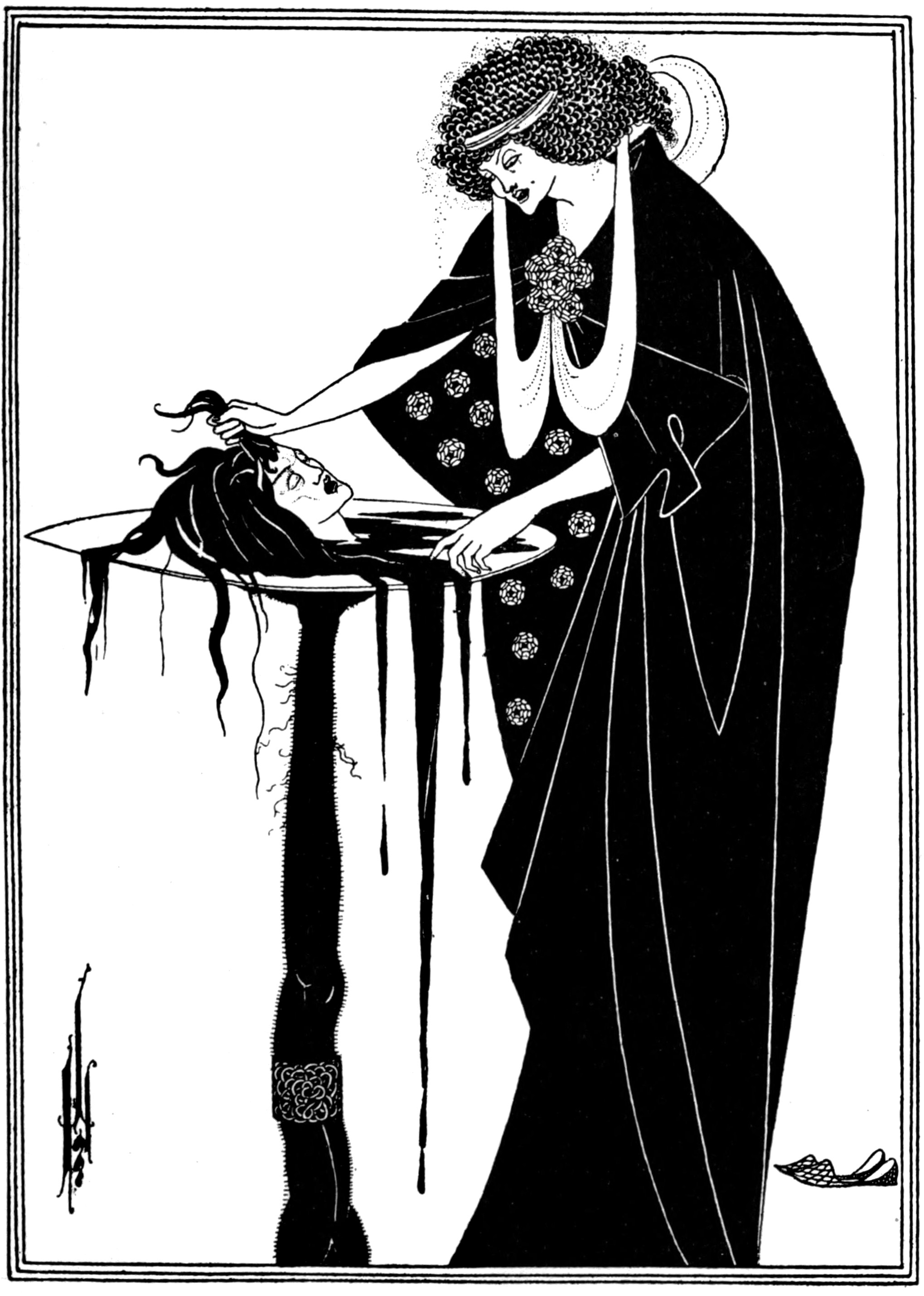
The Dancers Reward, from Salomé: a tragedy in one act (1904)

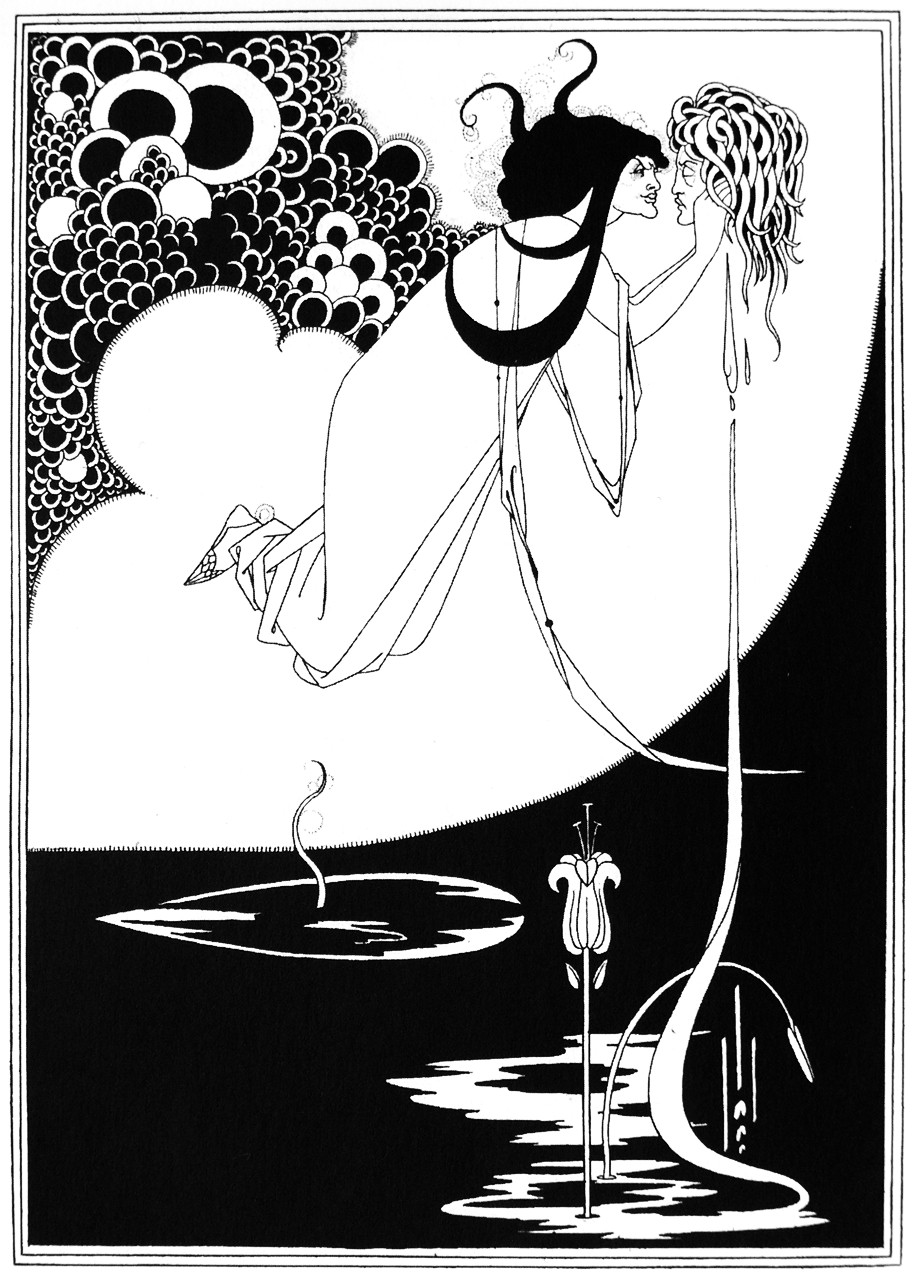
The Climax from the illustrations for Salomé, 1893–4

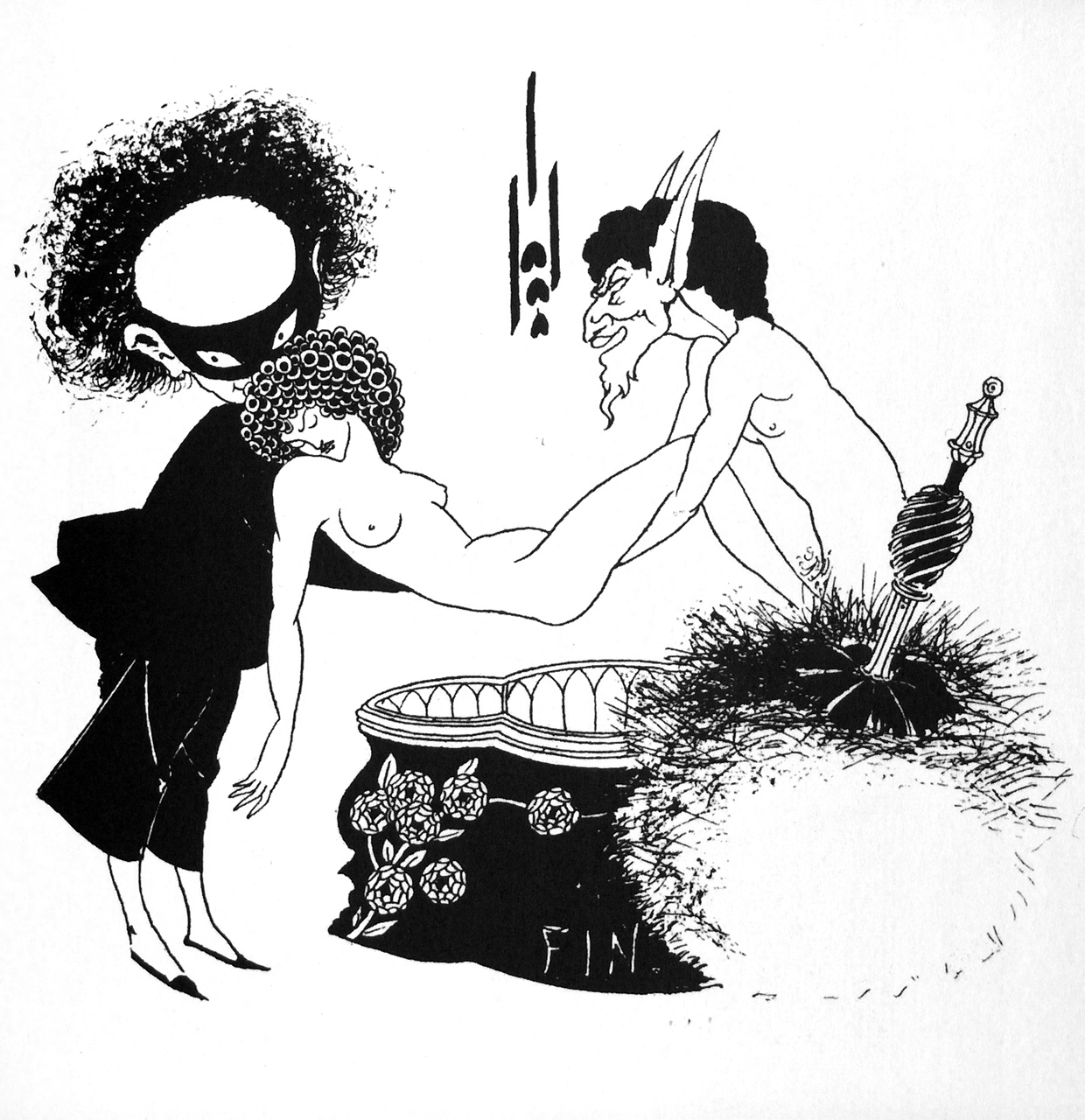
Tailpiece or Cul de Lampe, cover for Wilde's Salomé, 1893–4

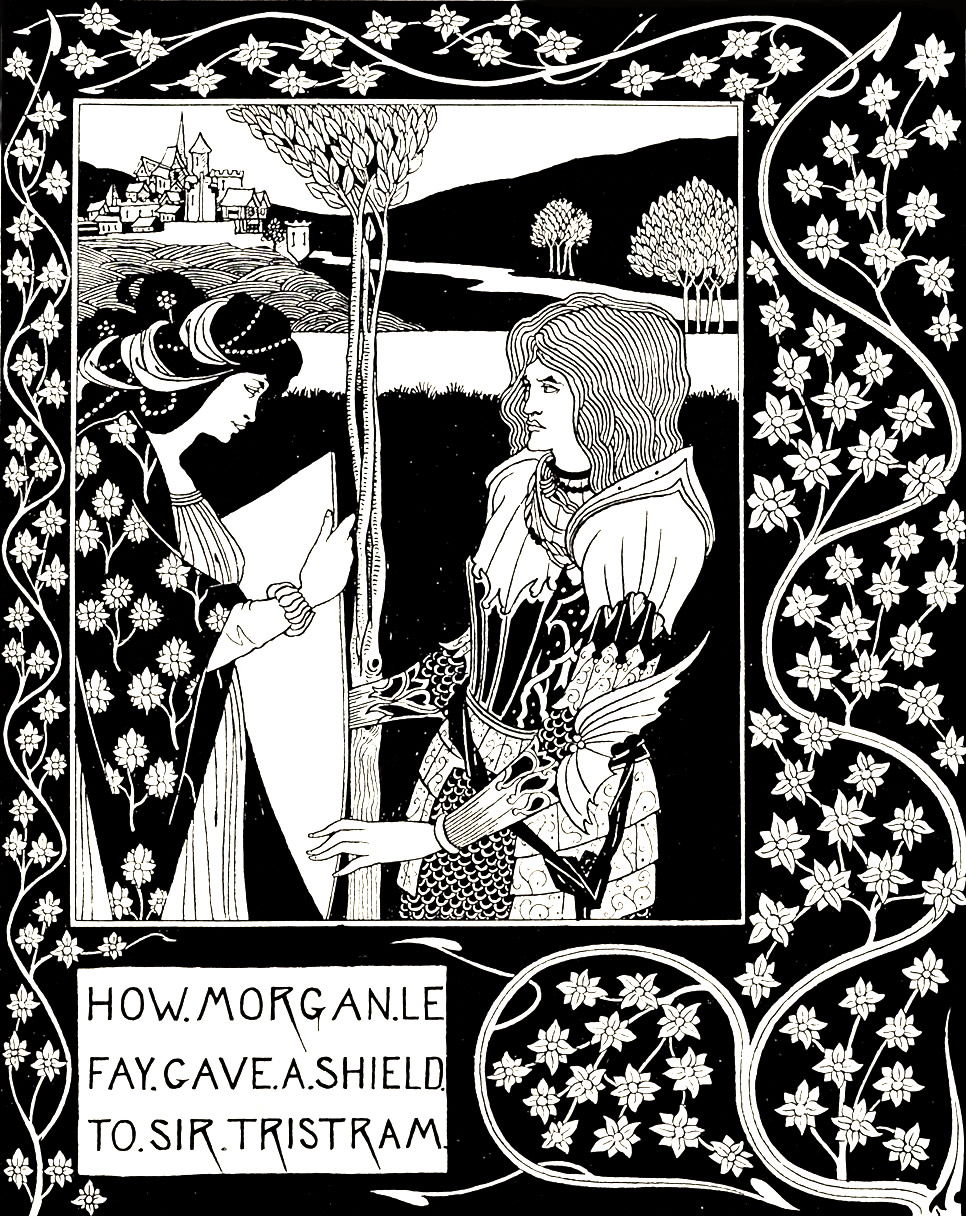
How Morgan le Fay gave a Shield to Sir Tristram, 1893

Self-portrait, 1892

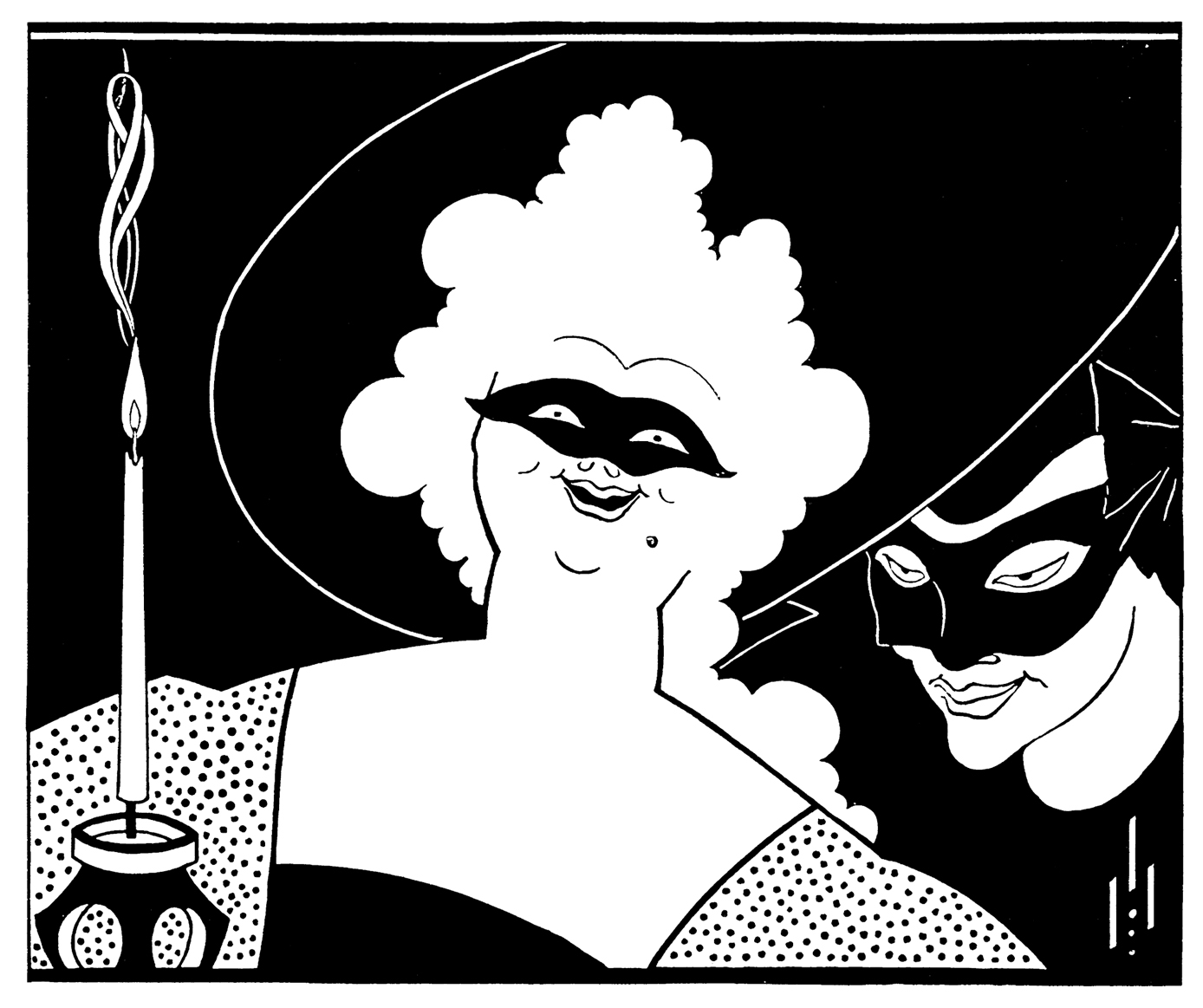
Masquerade, cover design for The Yellow Book, vol. 1, 1894

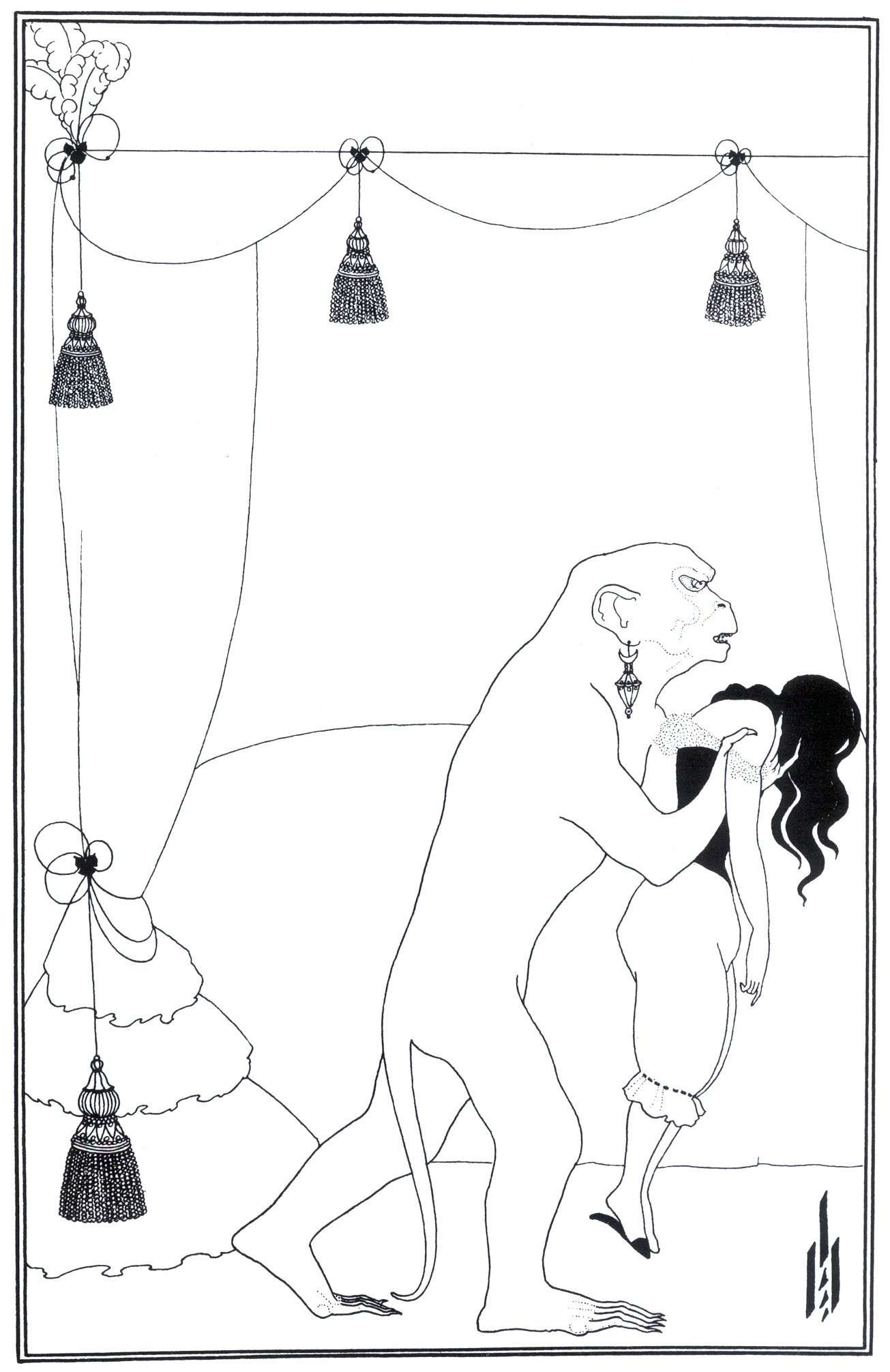
Illustration for Edgar Allan Poe's The Murders in the Rue Morgue, 1894–5

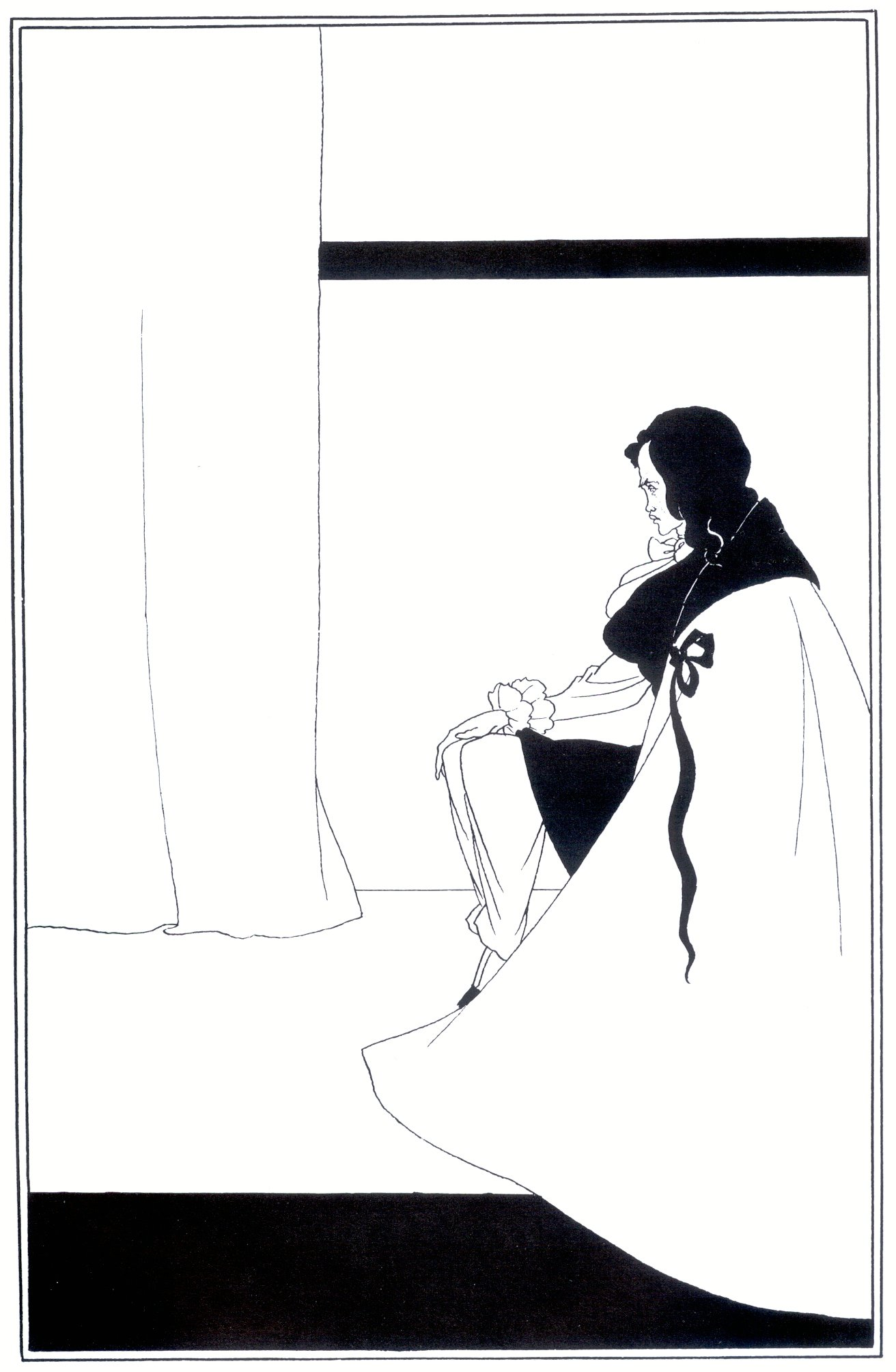
The Fall of the House of Usher, 1894–5

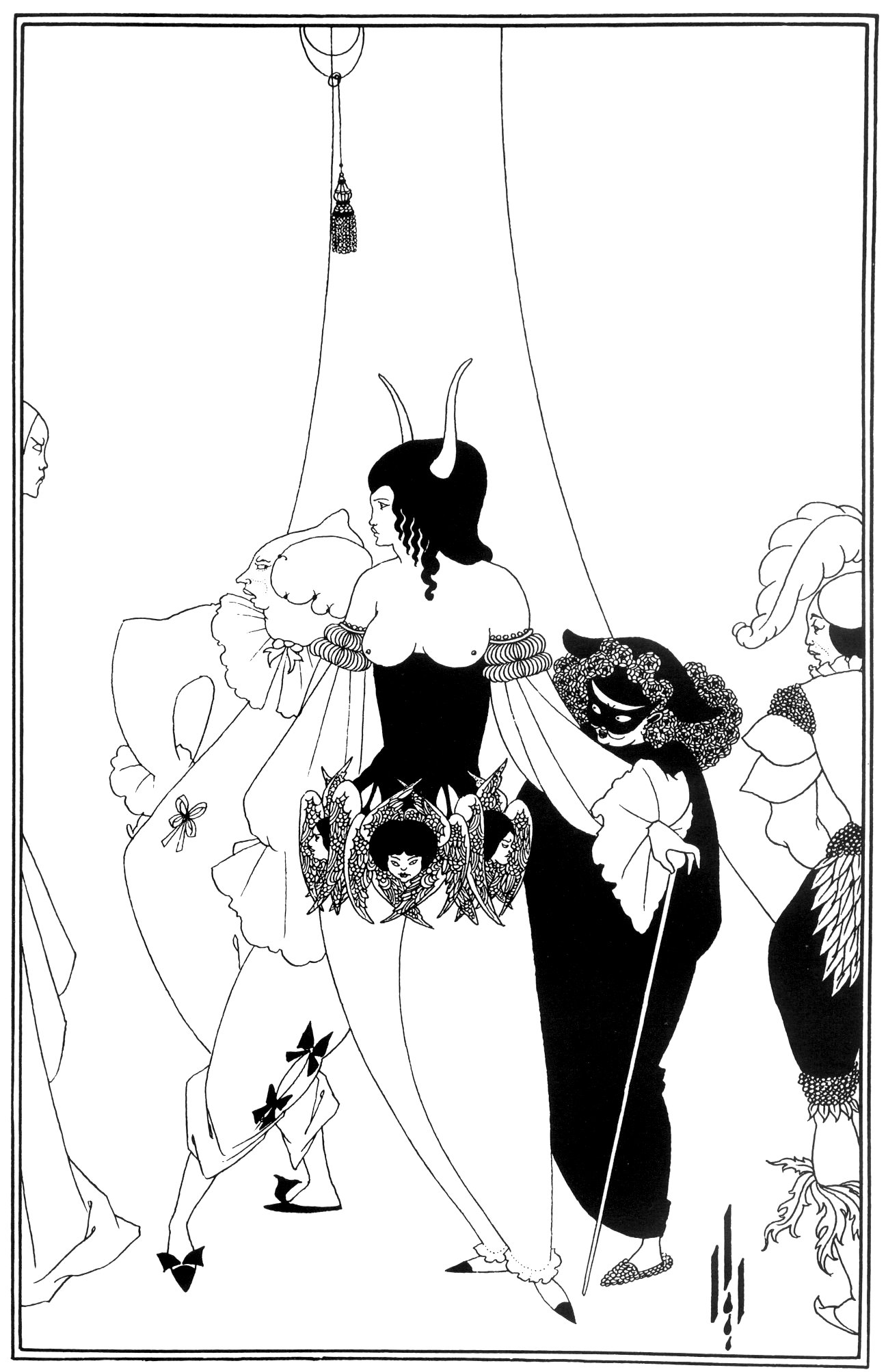
Illustration for The Masque of the Red Death, 1894–5

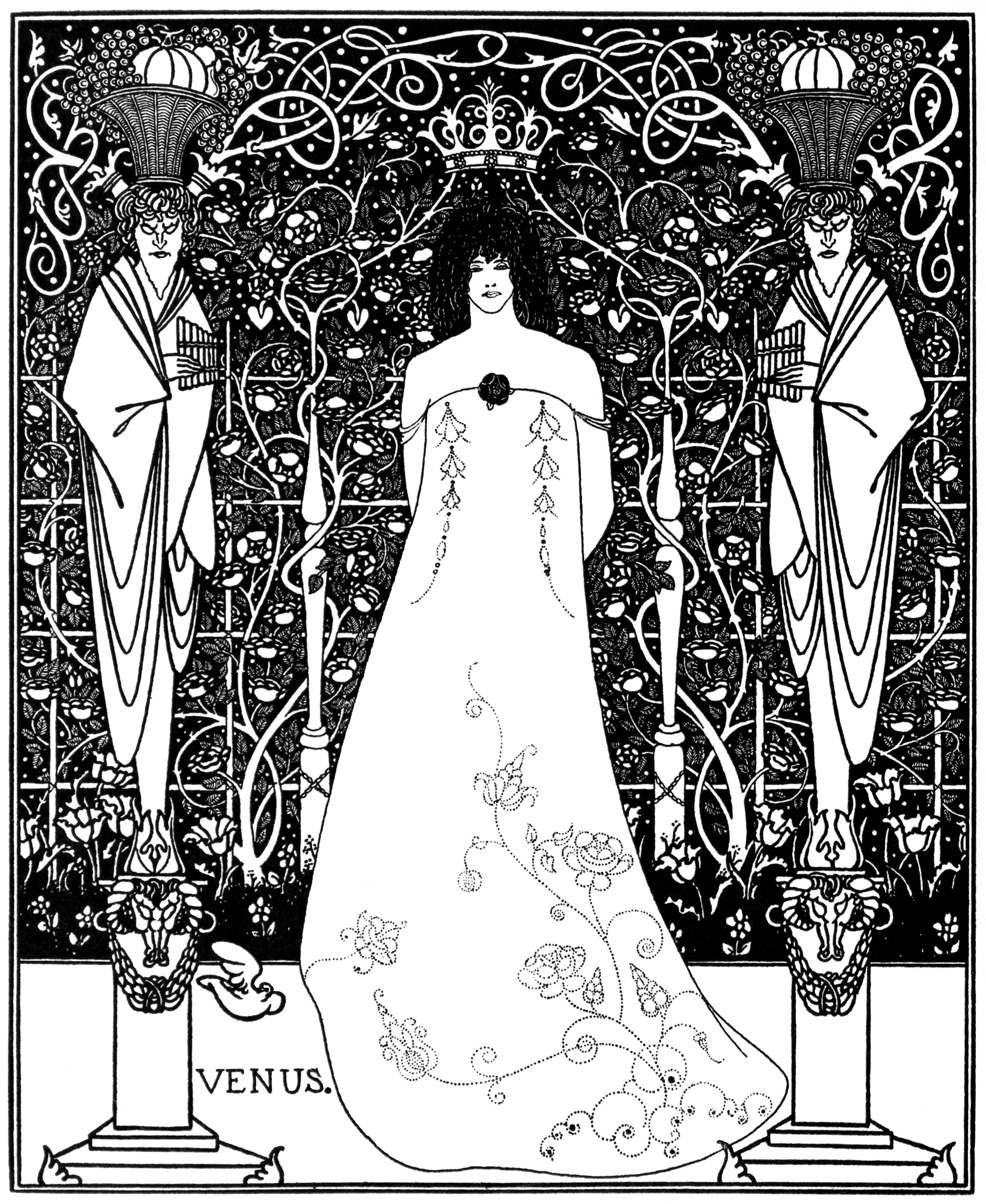
Venus between Terminal Gods, 1895

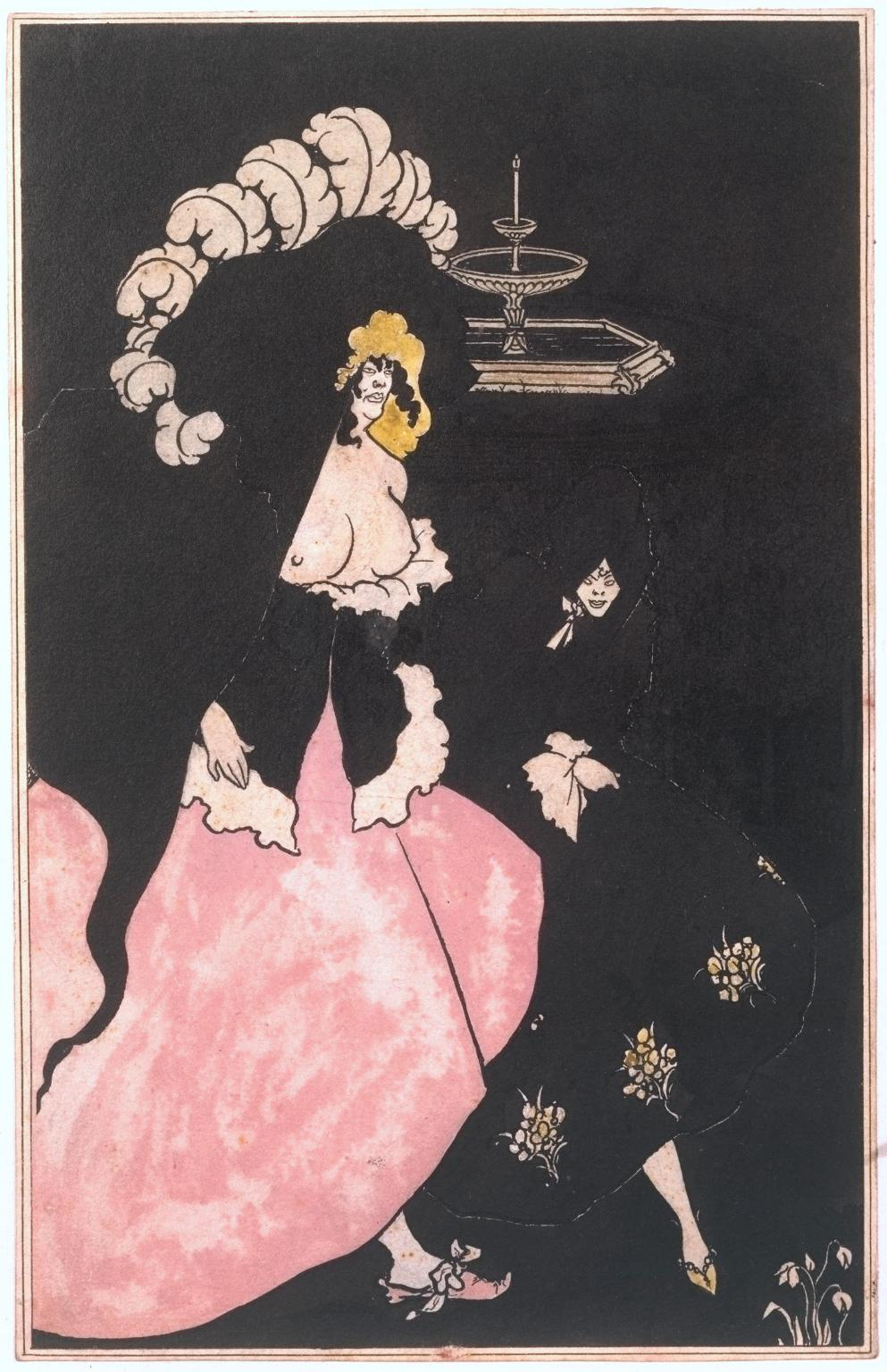
Messalina and her Companion, Tate Britain, 1895

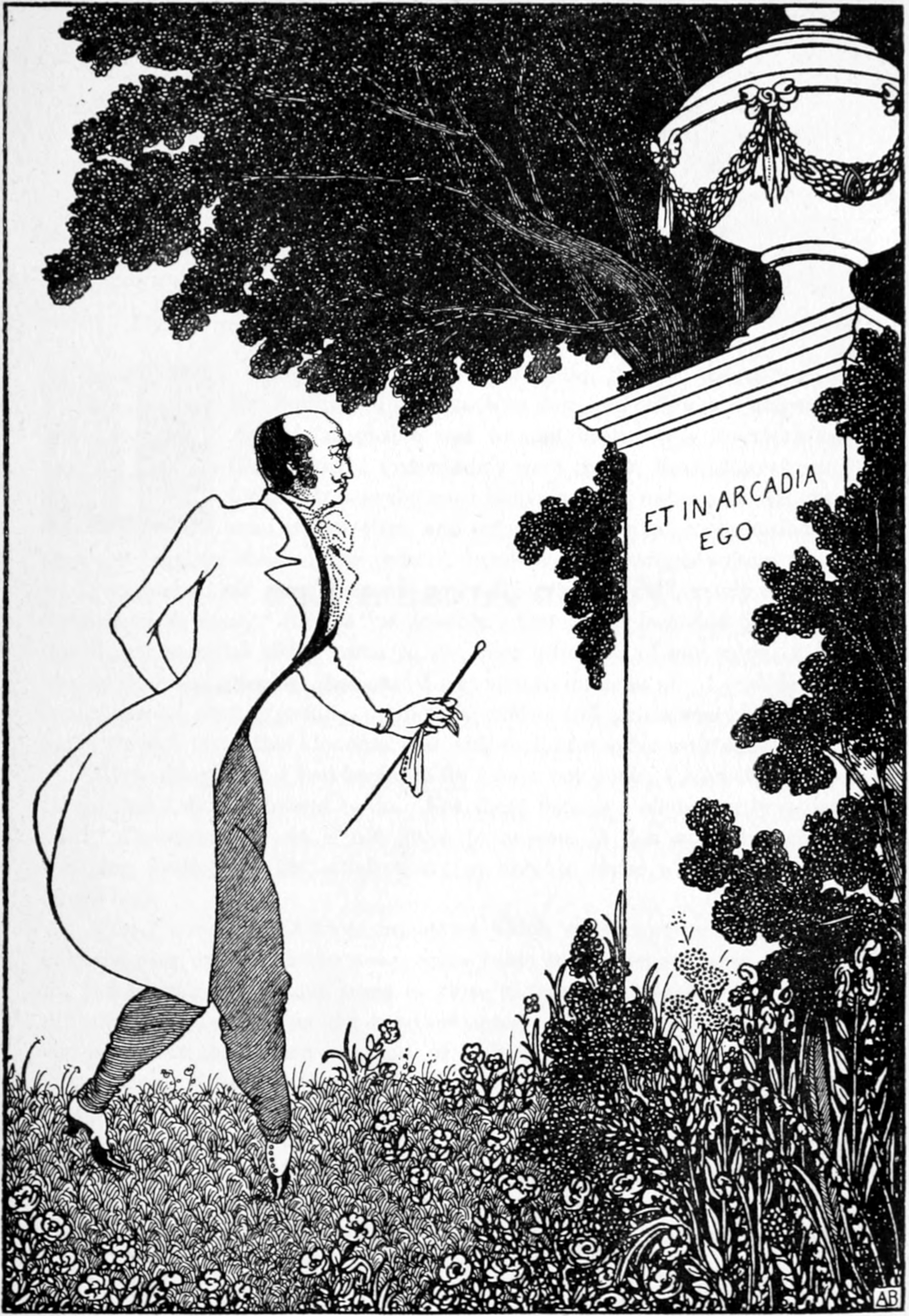
Et in Arcadia Ego, 1896

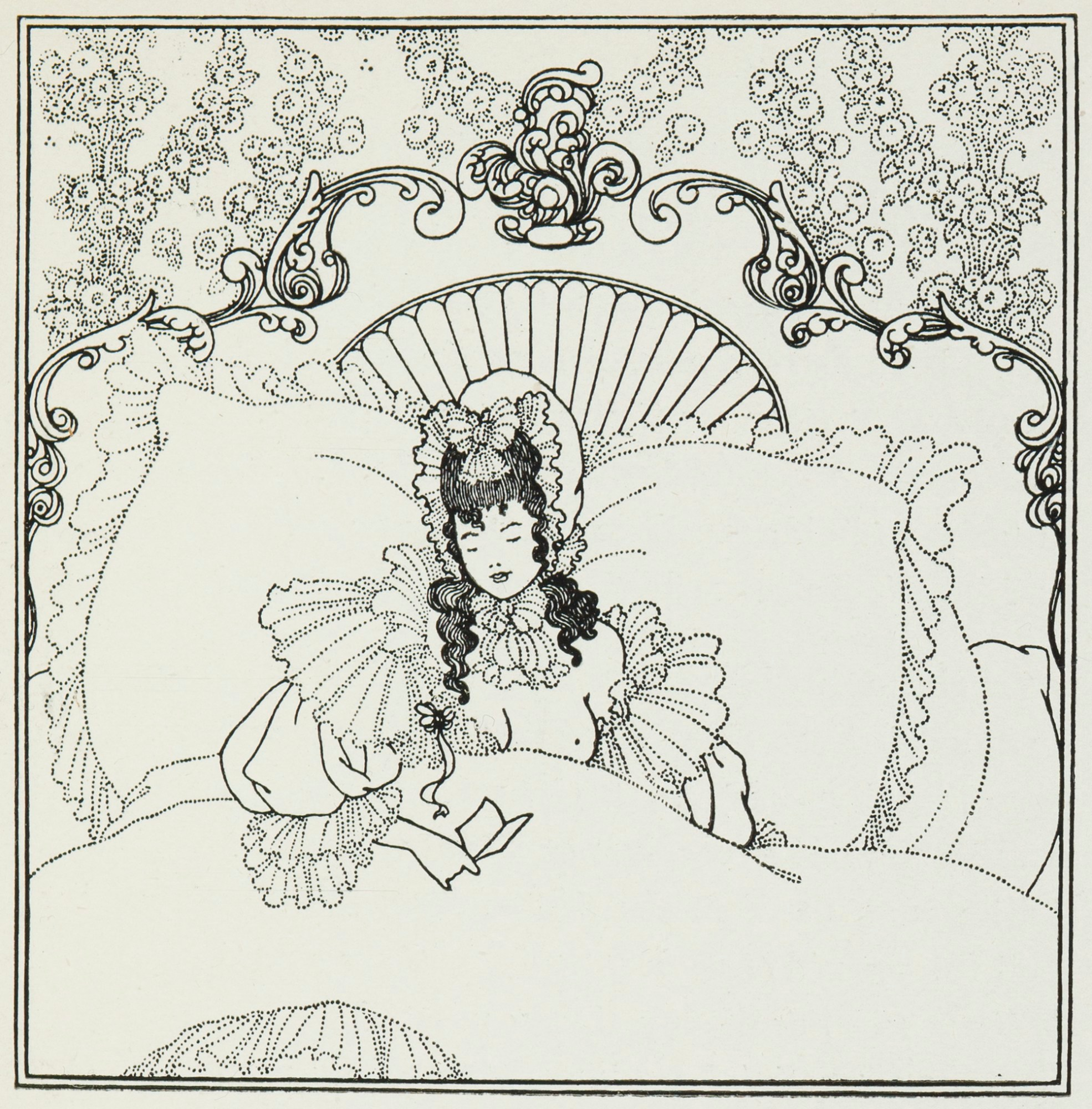
The Billet-doux, from The Rape of the Lock by Alexander Pope, 1896

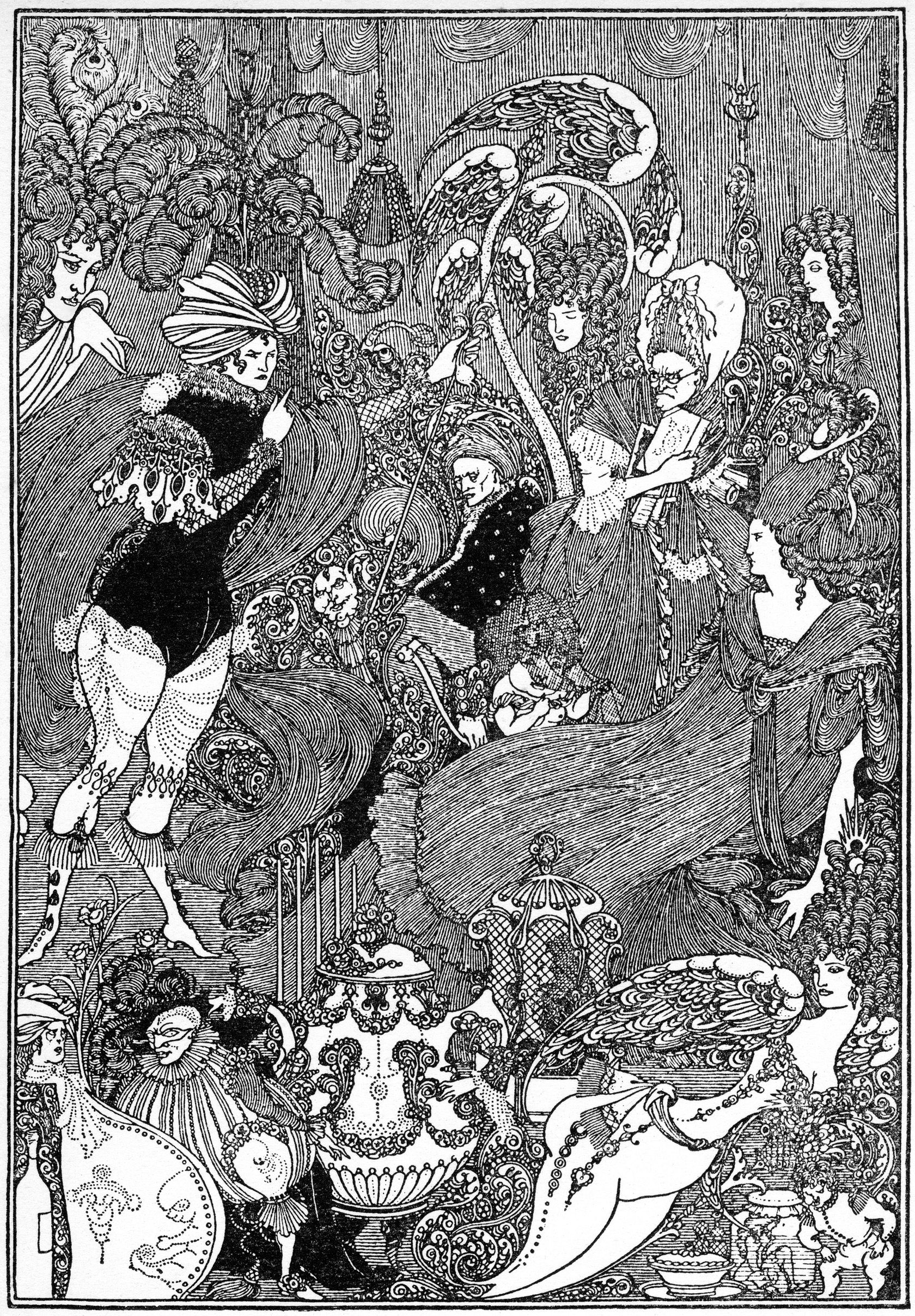
The Cave of Spleen, from The Rape of the Lock, 1896

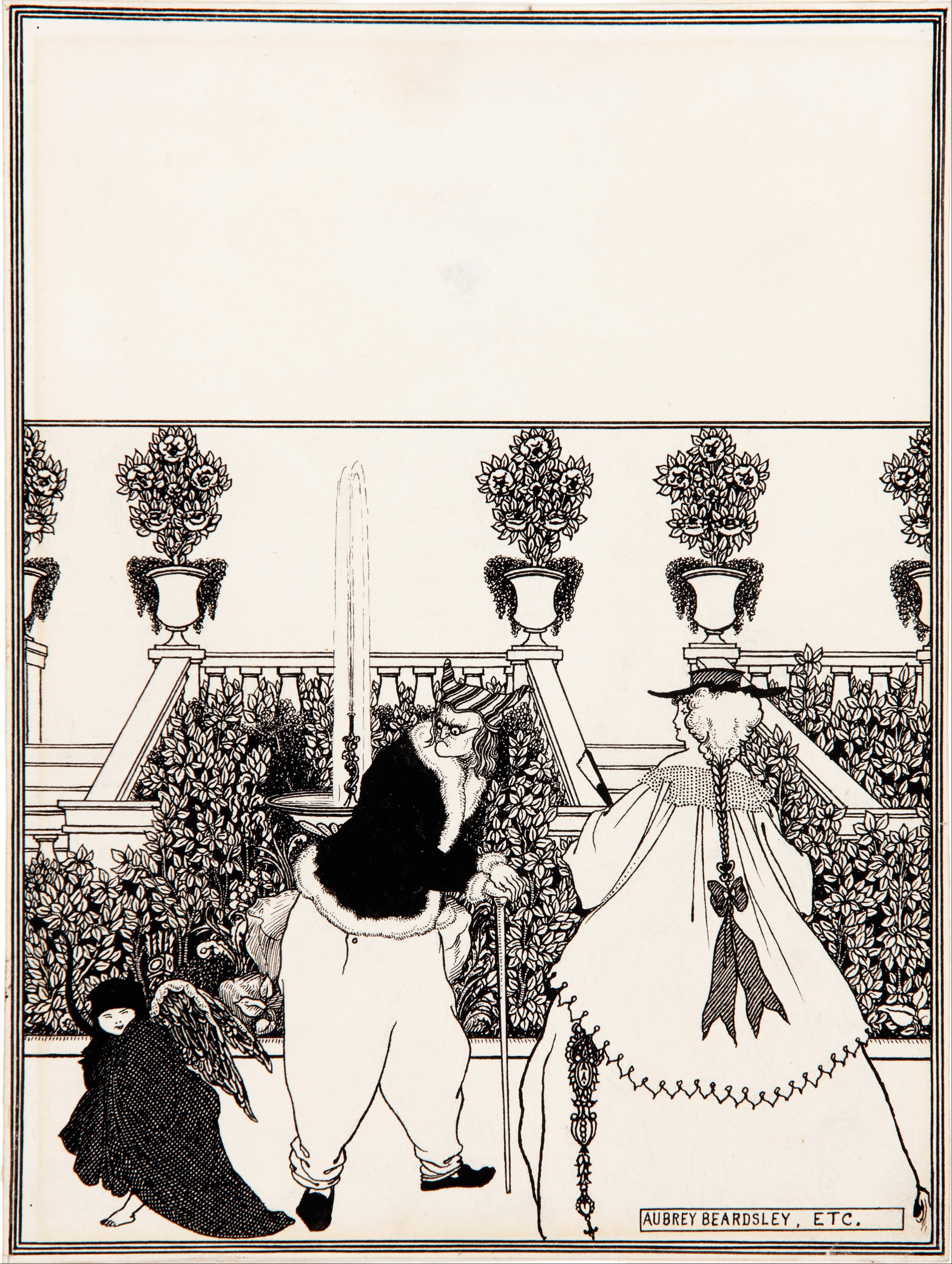
The driving of Cupid from the garden, preparatory drawing for the cover design of The Savoy (no. 3, July 1896)

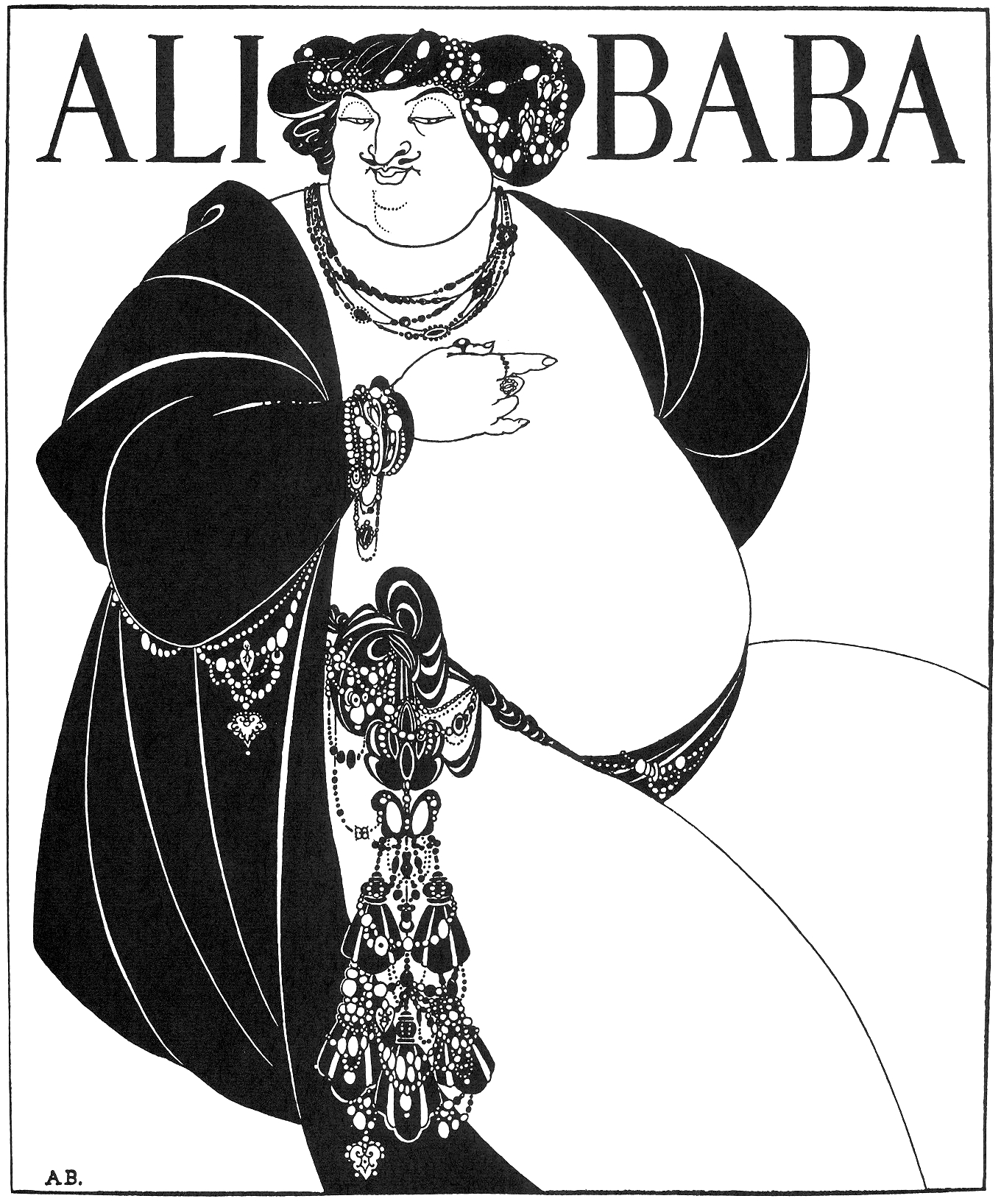
Cover of One Thousand and One Nights, 1897

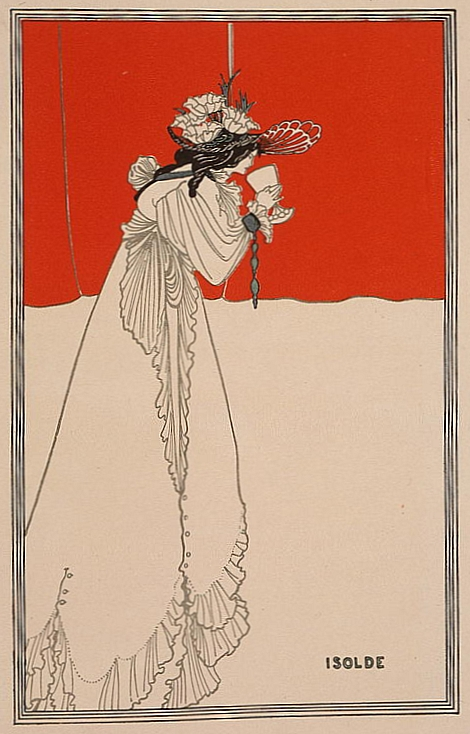
Isolde, illustration in Pan magazine, 1899

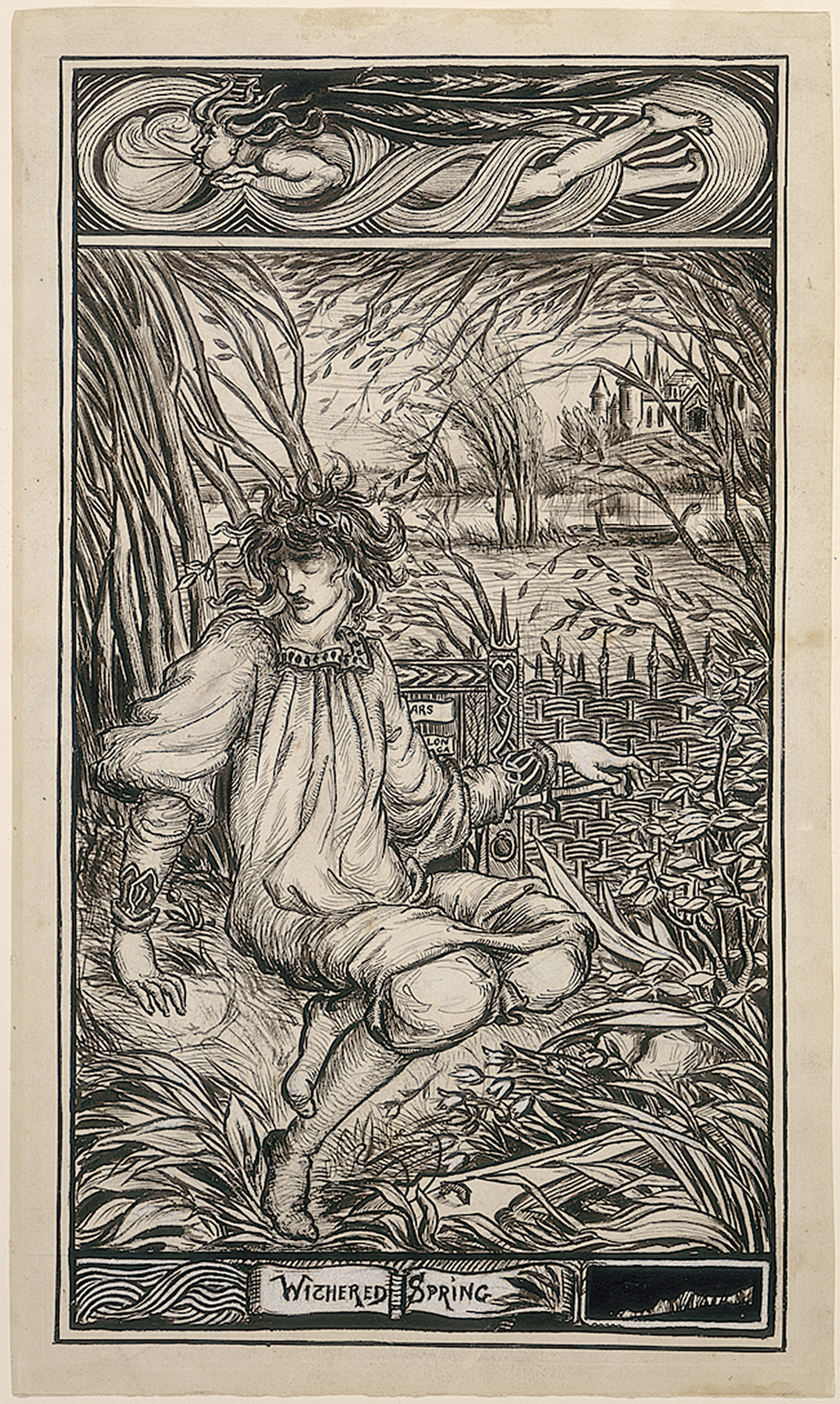
Withered Spring, unknown date, National Gallery of Art

== Works ==
- Beardsley, Aubrey, Simon Wilson, and Linda Gertner Zatlin. 1998. Aubrey Beardsley: a centenary tribute. Tokyo: Art Life Ltd. OCLC 42742305

== See also ==
- Art Nouveau
- Art Nouveau posters and graphic arts
- Harry Clarke

== General sources ==
- Armstrong, Walter (1901). "Beardsley, Aubrey Vincent" . In Lee, Sidney (ed.). Dictionary of National Biography (1st supplement). London: Smith, Elder & Co.
- Beardsley, Aubrey, Simon Wilson, and Linda Gertner Zatlin. 1998. Aubrey Beardsley: a centenary tribute. Tokyo: Art Life Ltd. OCLC 42742305
- Ross, Robert Baldwin. Aubrey Beardsley. Project Gutenberg, 2010.
- Beerbohm, Max. 1928. 'Aubrey Beardsley' in A Variety of Things. New York: Alfred A. Knopf.
- Benkovitz, Miriam J. 1980. Aubrey Beardsley, an Account of his Life. New York, N.Y.: Putnam. ISBN 0-399-12408-X.
- Brophy, Brigid (1968). Black and White: A Portrait of Aubrey Beardsley. New York, N.Y.: Stein and Day. OCLC 801979437.
- Calloway, Stephen. 1998. Aubrey Beardsley. New York, N.Y.: Harry N. Abrams. ISBN 0-8109-4009-4.
- Dovzhyk, Sasha. 2020. "Aubrey Beardsley in the Russian 'World of Art'". British Art Studies Issue 18. https://doi.org/10.17658/issn.2058-5462/issue-18/sdovzhyk
- Dowson, Ernest. 1897. The Pierrot of the Minute. Restored edition with Aubrey Beardsley's illustrations, CreateSpace, 2012. Bilingual illustrated edition with French translation by Philippe Baudry, CreateSpace, 2012
- Fletcher, Ian. 1987. Aubrey Beardsley. Boston, MA: Twayne Publishers. ISBN 0-8057-6958-7.
- Reade, Brian. 1967. Aubrey Beardsley. New York: Bonanza Books.
- Ross, Robert. 1909. Aubrey Beardsley London: John Lane.
- Snodgrass, Chris. 1995. Aubrey Beardsley: Dandy of the Grotesque. New York, N.Y.: Oxford University Press. ISBN 0-19-509062-4.
- Symons, Arthur. 1898. Aubrey Beardsley. London: At the Sign of the Unicorn.
- Sturgis, Matthew (1998). Aubrey Beardsley: A Biography. Harper Collins. ISBN 978-0-00-255789-4.
- Weintraub, Stanley. 1967. Beardsley: A Biography. New York, N.Y.: Braziller.
- Zatlin, Linda G. 1997. Beardsley, Japonisme, and the Perversion of the Victorian Ideal. Cambridge: Cambridge University Press. ISBN 0-521-58164-8.
- Zatlin, Linda G. 1990. Aubrey Beardsley and Victorian Sexual Politics. Oxford: Oxford University Press. ISBN 019817506X.
- Zatlin, Linda G. 2007. "Aubrey Beardsley and the Shaping of Art Nouveau." Bound for the 1890s: Essays on Writing and Publishing in Honor of James G. Nelson. Ed. Jonathan Allison. Buckinghamshire: Rivendale Press.
- Zatlin, Linda G. "Wilde, Beardsley, and the Making of Salome." Scholars Library, 2007; originally published in The Journal of Victorian Culture 5.2 (November 2000): 341–57.
- Zatlin, Linda G. 2006. "Aubrey Beardsley." Encyclopedia of Europe 1789–1914. Chicago: Gale Research.
