= The Climax (illustration) =

Illustration by Aubrey Beardsley

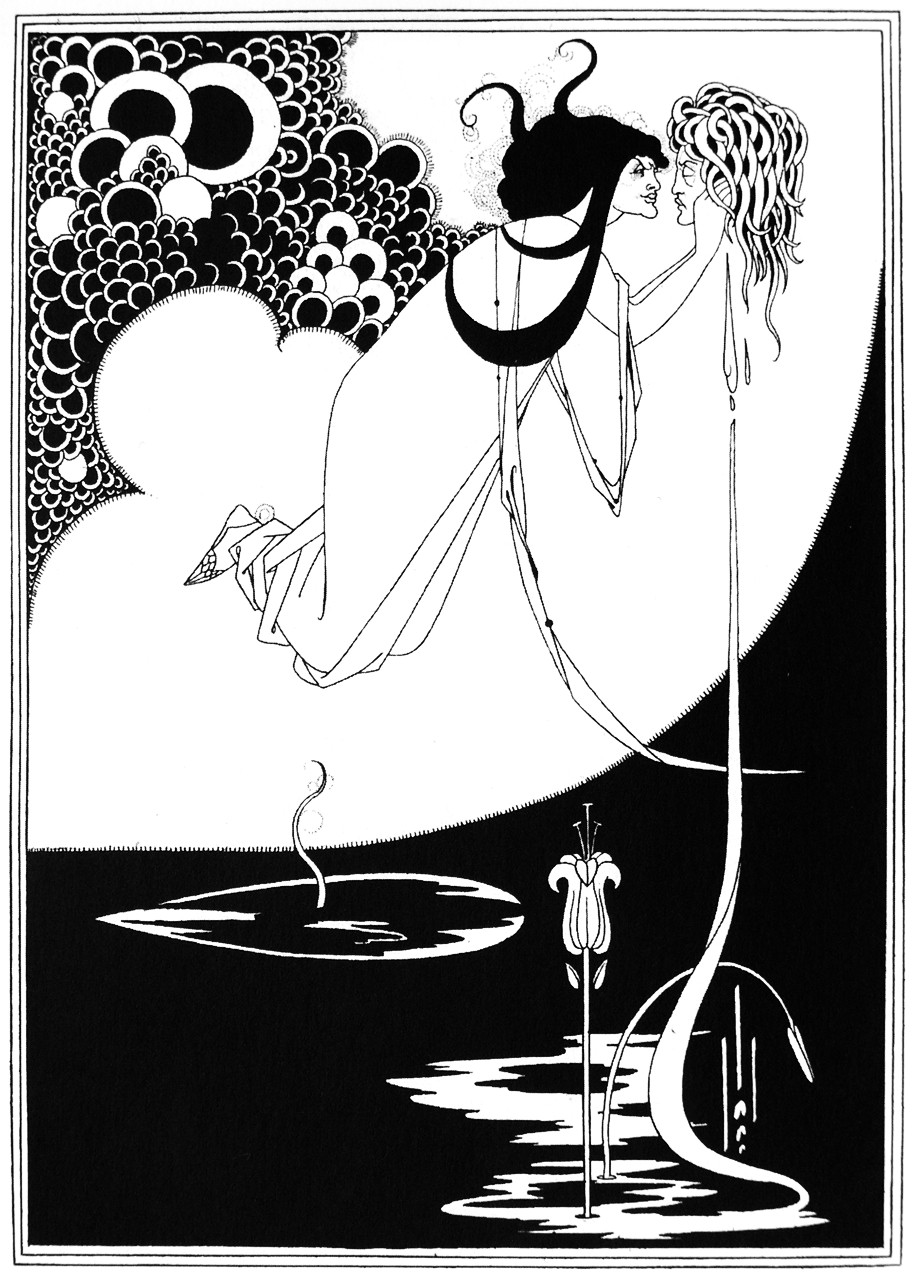
Aubrey Beardsley, The Climax, 1893. It was first published in 1894. Line block prints were produced by John Lane in 1907 on Japanese vellum

The Climax is an 1893 illustration by Aubrey Beardsley (1872–1898), a leading artist of the Decadent (1880-1900) and Aesthetic movements. It depicts a scene from Oscar Wilde's 1891 play Salome, in which the femme fatale Salome has just kissed the severed head of John the Baptist, which she grasps in her hands. Elements of eroticism, symbolism, and Orientalism are present in the piece. This illustration is one of sixteen Wilde commissioned Beardsley to create for the publication of the play. The series is considered to be Beardsley's most celebrated work, created at the age of 21.

== Background ==
Beardsley was born in Brighton, Sussex, England, in August 1872. His career was short-lived, as he died from tuberculosis at the age of 25. Nonetheless, he was one of the most influential artists of the Decadent movement (1880-1900), and a leader of the Aesthetic movement. These movements centered on the idea of "art for art's sake".

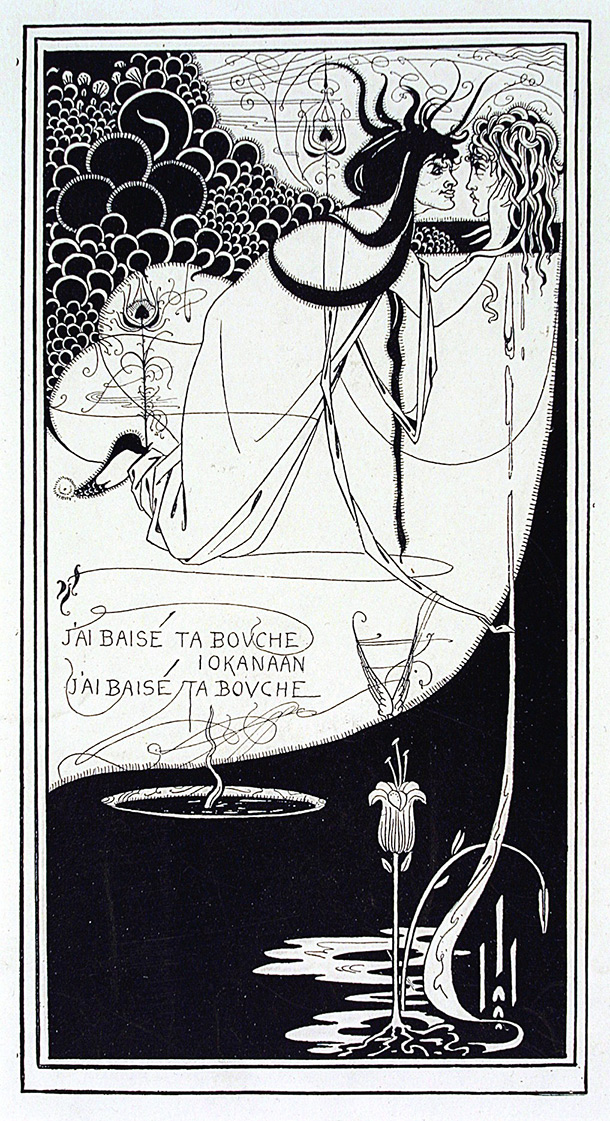
Aubrey Beardsley, J'ai baisé ta bouche Iokanaan, illustration, The Studio, April 1893.

Beardsley created his first version of The Climax, J'ai baisé ta bouche Iokanaan, as an illustration for the French version of Oscar Wilde's play, Salome. This illustration and eight others were printed in an article, "A New Illustrator: Aubrey Beardsley", by Joseph Pennell in the first issue of the artistic journal, The Studio in April 1893.

== Style and symbolism ==
Wilde, one of the most influential members of the "Decadence", commissioned Beardsley to illustrate the English version of his play, which resulted in The Climax, The Stomach Dance, and The Eyes of Herod, in which women are attributed with traditionally male vices of lust, desire to dominate, and materialism. The Climax was redrawn because The Studio owned the copyright for the original drawing. The femme fatale of the successor was less menacing. Stylistically, it was more advanced, and it was drawn with more conventional page proportions, as compared to the J'ai baisé ta bouche Iokanaan version made with an elongated upright format.

First published in 1894, The Climax consists of strong, precise lines, decorative motifs characteristic of the developing Art Nouveau style, and the use of only black ink. Beardsley's style was influenced by Japanese woodcuts also known as Ukiyo-e, which comes through in the flatness of imagery, compositional arrangement, and the stylistic motifs. Elements of eroticism are also apparent.

The main focus of this illustration, Salome, floats in midair and in her hands she holds the head of John the Baptist just after she kissed it, depicting the final words said by Salome in the play "J'ai baisé ta bouche Iokanaan, j'ai baisé ta bouche" ("I have kissed your mouth, Jokannan, I have kissed your mouth"). Her hair billows in snake-like tendrils above her as she stares at the closed eyes of John the Baptist. His severed head drips blood that nourishes the phallic lily. The flower also symbolizes purity. Composing the background behind these two figures is a white quarter section of the moon and a stylized depiction of peacock feathers, a signature motif in Beardsley's illustrations, made of concentric circles.

Beardsley satirized Victorian values regarding sex, that at the time highly valued respectability, and men's fear of female superiority, as the women's movement made gains in economic rights and occupational and educational opportunities by the 1880s. Salome's power over men can be seen in the way that Beardsley presents her as a monster-like figure, reminiscent of Medusa.

== Reaction ==
Beardsley said of his drawing that rather than using thicker lines for the foreground than those for the background, he felt that the lines should be the same width. Morgan Meis of The New Yorker states that "his influence on the look of Art Nouveau, and then on early modernism, is hard to overstate. His thick black lines fused the graphical ideas of the past with the techniques and subject matter of a new age just on the horizon." He was an inspiration to Japanese illustrators, graphic designers, and printmakers of the early 20th century Taishō period.

The Climax is described as among his finest works by Ian Fletcher and established him as one of the "Decadence". It was not appreciated, though, by mainstream art critics of the time, who found the Salome drawings repulsive and unintelligible. Art historian Kenneth Clark said that it "aroused more horror and indignation than any graphic work hitherto produced in England."

== Collection ==
The original pen and ink drawing was in a private collection until 1926, when thirteen of Beardsley's drawings were sold. Nine of the drawings became part of a collection at Fogg Art Museum at Harvard University, but The Climax and three other works of art were missing for 80 years. Then, Stuart Whitehurst, an appraiser, auctioneer and art nouveau devotee, found The Climax and A Platonic Lament, another Beardsley drawing, hanging in the bathroom of a Bostonian who said he had inherited them from his grandmother and did not know of their significance. The drawings were sold by Skinner Auctioneers to the same private collector. A Platonic Lament sold for $142,200 and The Climax for $213,300, which exceeded the previous record price of $159,600 for a Beardsley drawing.

== Bibliography ==
- Stephen Calloway, "Aubrey Beardsley and the 1890s Scene," in Aubrey Beardsley (London: V&A Publications, 1998), p. 10, ISBN 9781851772193
- Miriam Benkovitz, Aubrey Beardsley: an Account of His Life. (New York: G. P. Putnam's Sons, 1981), p. 57, ISBN 9780399124082
- Brigid Brophy, Beardsley and His World (New York: Harmony Books, 1976), p. 65, ISBN 9780500130575
