= Mabel Beardsley =

English actress (1871–1916)

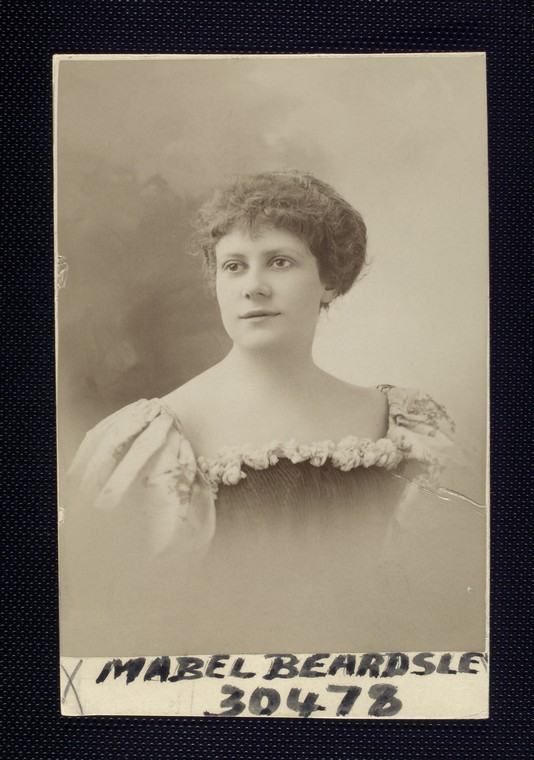
Mabel Beardsley

Mabel Beardsley (24 August 1871 – 8 May 1916) was an English Victorian actress and elder sister of the famous illustrator Aubrey Beardsley, who according to her brother's biographer, "achieved mild notoriety for her exotic and flamboyant appearance".

== Life ==
Mabel was born in Brighton on 24 August 1871. Her father, Vincent Paul Beardsley, was the son of a tradesman; Vincent had no trade himself, however, and instead relied on a private income from an inheritance that he received from his maternal grandfather when he was 21. Vincent's wife, Ellen Agnus Pitt, was the daughter of Surgeon-Major William Pitt of the Indian Army. The Pitts were a well-established and respected family in Brighton, and Beardsley's mother married a man of lesser social status than might have been expected. Soon after their wedding, Vincent was obliged to sell some of his property in order to settle a claim for his "breach of promise" from another woman who claimed that he had promised to marry her.

Mabel and her family were living in Ellen's familial home at 12 Buckingham Road at the time of her brother Aubrey Beardsley's birth. The number of the house in Buckingham Road was 12, but the numbers were changed, and it is now 31. In 1883, her family settled in London, and in the following year, she appeared in public playing at several concerts with her brother Aubrey. Speculation about Aubrey’s sexuality includes rumors of an incestuous relationship with Mabel, who may have become pregnant by her brother and miscarried.

In 1902, she married fellow actor George Bealby Wright, then about 25 years old, who acted under the name George Bealby.

She died on 8 May 1916.

== Friend of W. B. Yeats ==
Yeats' biographer David Pierce notes of Mabel that:

"According to Yeats, in reference to the Rhymers' Club, she was 'practically one of us'; later, she used to attend Yeats's Monday evenings at Woburn Buildings. From 1912, when she was diagnosed as suffering from cancer, until her death in 1916, Yeats was a frequent visitor to her bedside and composed a series of poems on her titled 'Upon a Dying Lady'".

W. B. Yeats' poem "Upon a Dying Lady" is about Mabel.

== Media portrayals ==
In 1982 Playhouse drama Aubrey, written by John Selwyn Gilbert, Mabel was portrayed by actress Rula Lenska.

== Appearances ==
- Four Little Girls by Walter Stokes Craven, opened at the Criterion Theatre, 17 July 1897.
- The Queen's Proctor, Royalty Theatre, June 1896
