= Somerset Center, Michigan =

- Unincorporated community
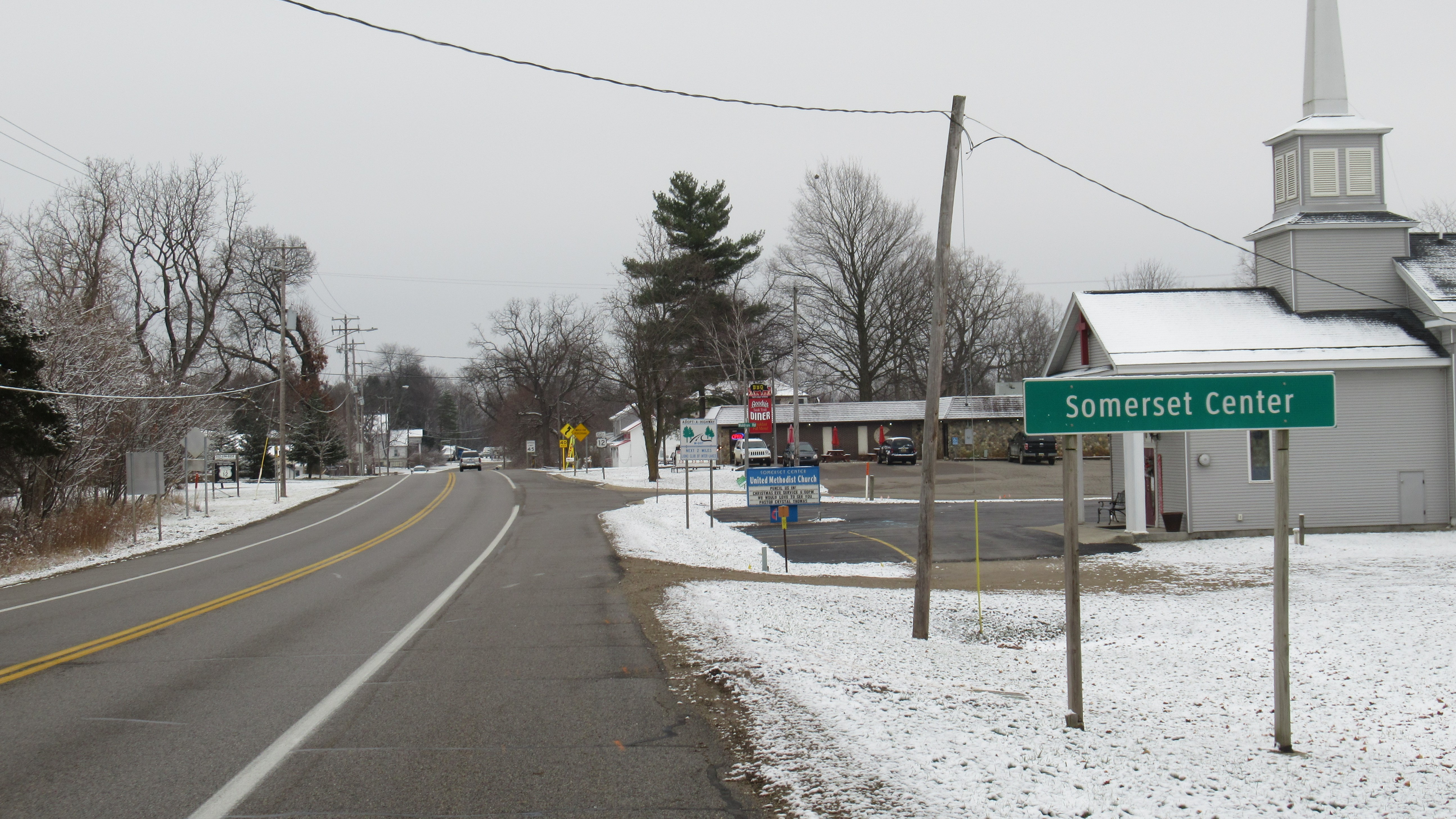
- Looking east along Chicago Road (US 12)

- Location within the state of Michigan Location within the United States
- Coordinates: 42°03′04″N 84°24′49″W
- Country: United States
- State: Michigan
- County: Hillsdale
- Township: Somerset
- Settled: 1833
- Elevation: 1,060 ft (320 m)
- Time zone: UTC-5 (Eastern (EST))
  - Summer (DST): UTC-4 (EDT)
- ZIP code(s): 49249 (Jerome); 49282
- Area code: 517
- GNIS feature ID: 638243

Somerset Center is an unincorporated community in Hillsdale County in the U.S. state of Michigan. The community is located along U.S. Highway 12 (US 12) within Somerset Township.

As an unincorporated community, Somerset Center has no legally defined boundaries or population statistics of its own but does have its own post office with the 49282 ZIP Code.

== Geography ==
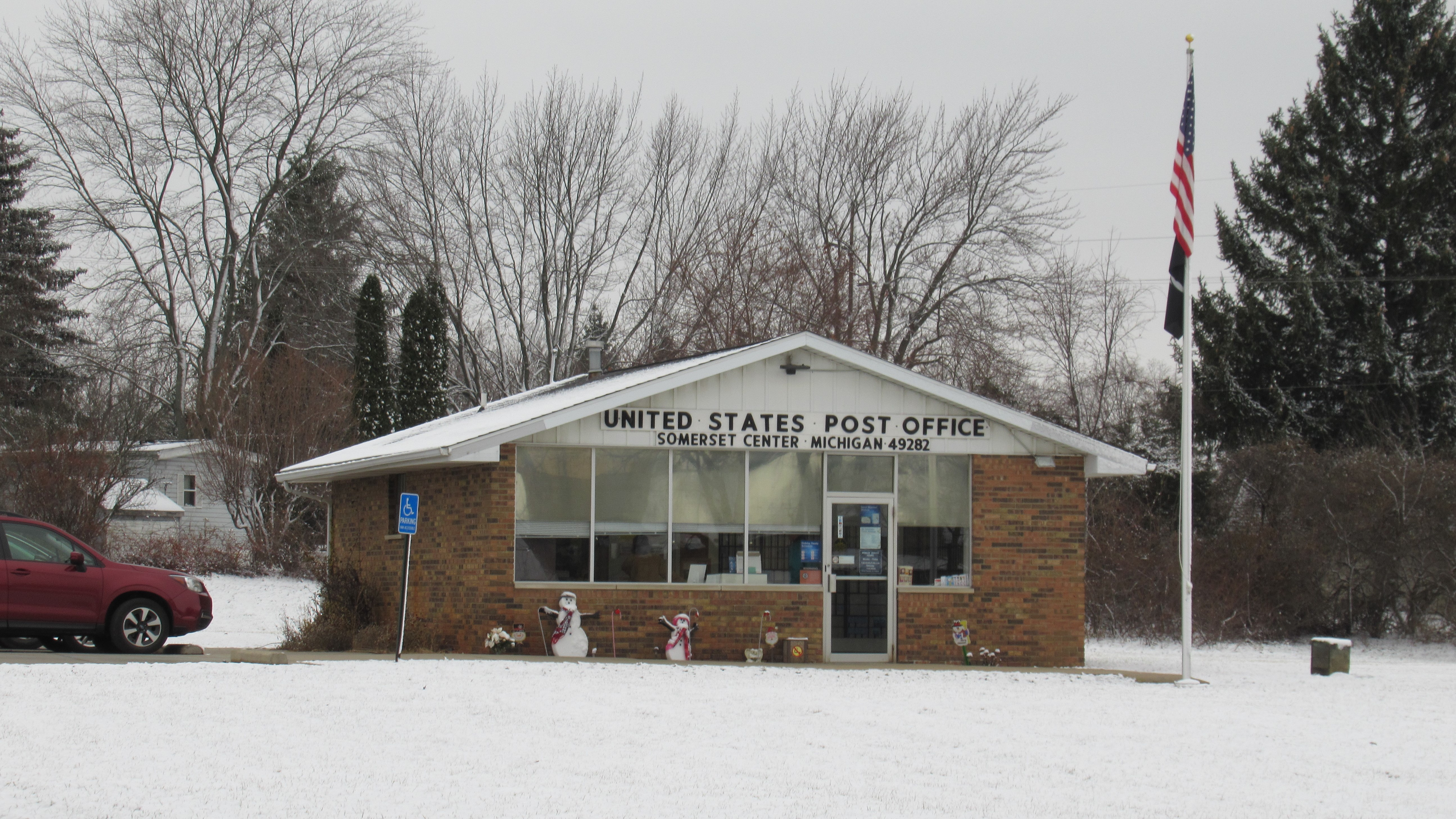
U.S. Post Office in Somerset Center

Somerset Center is located in southeast Michigan in the northeastern corner of Hillsdale County. Located within Somerset Township on the outer edge of the Irish Hills region, the community sits at an elevation of 1,060 feet (320 m), which is among the highest elevations in southeast Michigan.

The community is located about 1.5 miles (2.4 km) south of the county line with Jackson County. US 12, known locally as Chicago Road, is the main roadway through the community, and it has a junction with US 127 about 3.0 miles (4.8 km) to the east. Nearby incorporated villages include Cement City to the northeast and Addison further away to the southeast. Other nearby unincorporated communities include Somerset directly to the east, Jerome to the southwest, the census-designated place of Lake LeAnn directly to the northeast, and Liberty in Jackson County to the north.

The area contains numerous lakes near Somerset Center. The largest of these lakes is Lake LeAnn, and some of the other named lakes include Blood Lake, Crystal Lake, Lake Somerset, Lombard Lake, Mission Lake, and Moon Lake. Many of these lakes are connected by Goose Creek, which is part of the River Raisin watershed. Somerset State Game Area is a 748-acre (303 ha) state game area located within the township just south of Somerset Center. The source of Michigan's longest river, Grand River, is located just north of Somerset Center.

The Somerset Township Hall and Fire Department are located within Somerset Center in the same building at 12715 East Chicago Road. The Somerset Center post office is located at 12631 East Chicago Road. The Somerset Center 49282 ZIP Code serves only a small centralized area of Somerset Township, including the western portion of Somerset, which does not have its own physical post office and uses the Somerset Center post office for its own post office box services with the 49281 ZIP Code. The surrounding area may also be served by the Jerome 49249 ZIP Code, which serves a much larger area. The community is served by Addison Community Schools to the southwest in the village of Addison in Lenawee County.

== History ==
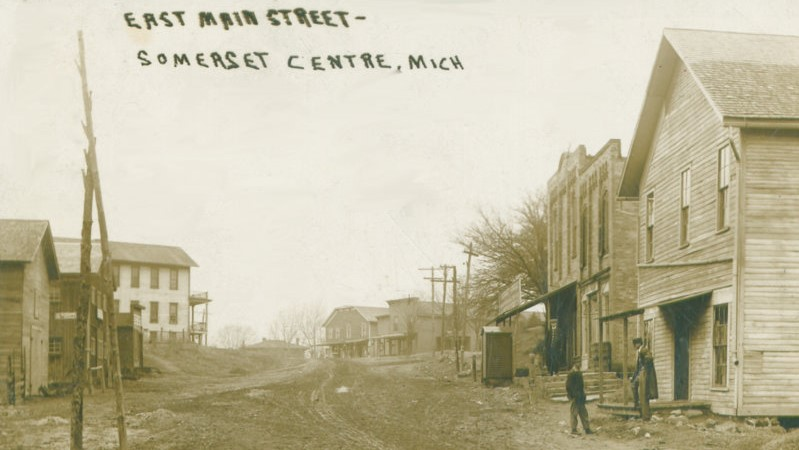
Historic image of Main Street

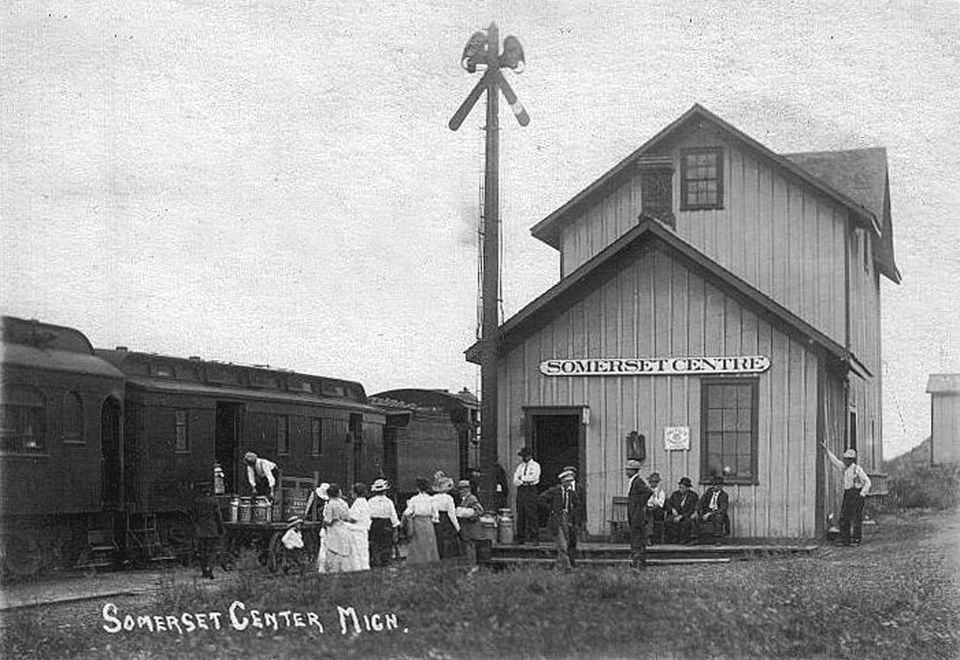
Former train depot in Somerset Center

The area was first settled when Elias Alley, who came from Cayuga County, New York, built his home here as early as 1833. Cornelius Millspaw may have been the first settler in the area around this time, but he never finished his log cabin or settled in the area. Many of the first settlers in the area became wheat harvesters and merchants.

Somerset Center was slightly west of the community of Somerset, which was settled one year earlier by James Van Hoevenburg. Throughout its early history, the community was spelled interchangeably as Somerset Center or Somerset Centre. In 1835, Hillsdale County was formally organized, and the largely undeveloped area became part of the newly established Wheatland Township. Thomas Gamble, who purchased the Hoevenburg homestead, became the first postmaster when a post office began operating on September 9, 1835. The post office was first named Wheatland after the township. It was soon renamed to Gambleville on October 17, 1837, when the northern 36-square-mile survey township area of Wheatland Township was separated into Somerset Township. In 1841, the post office was renamed Somerset after the township, which itself was named after Somerset, New York. The post office was relocated to the centralized portion of the township and renamed Somerset Centre, only to eventually be moved back to its original location to the east. It again took the name Gambleville, where it would again be changed to the name Somerset by 1872.

The community can be seen on an 1857 map of Hillsdale County. The community was officially platted on February 17, 1872. On an 1872 map of Somerset Township, Somerset Centre can be seen in section 10 along the Chicago Road; Somerset (then known as Somerset Station) can be seen to the east in section 12. With the Somerset post office still operating, Somerset Centre would receive its own separate post office on June 19, 1872. The post office was originally spelled as Somerset Centre until it was respelled as Somerset Center on November 25, 1893. Around that time, the community received a train station along the newly constructed Detroit, Hillsdale, & Southwestern Railroad, which later became the Ypsilanti Branch of the New York Central Railroad.

One of the most notable early residents of Somerset Center was William Herbert Lee McCourtie, who was born near here in 1872. After graduating college, he moved to Texas and became very wealthy in the cement industry. He returned to Somerset Center to live with his family and bought his 42-acre (17 ha) family farm in 1924. He transformed the estate into a recreation area known as Aiden Lair that hosted many lavish events and prominent guests, including Henry Ford. In the early 1930s, he commissioned the creation of numerous cement bridges over the small stream running through the estate, and the unique design of the concrete was sculpted to look like wood. McCourtie died in 1933 at the age of 61, and the estate passed through multiple owners. The old farmhouse, which was built in the 1850s was deemed too expensive to restore and was demolished; the bridges and some older structures remain. The township purchased the property in 1987 and converted it into a public park known as McCourtie Park, which is along the US 12 Heritage Trail through the community.

The Somerset Center Cemetery is located in the center of the community along Waldron Road and U.S. Route 12. William H. L. McCourtie and his family mausoleum are located within Somerset Center Cemetery. The McCourtie Mausoleum, which was built in 1927, is listed as a Michigan State Historic Site. The William H. L. McCourtie Estate is also recognized as both a state historic site and listed on the National Register of Historic Places.

== Images ==
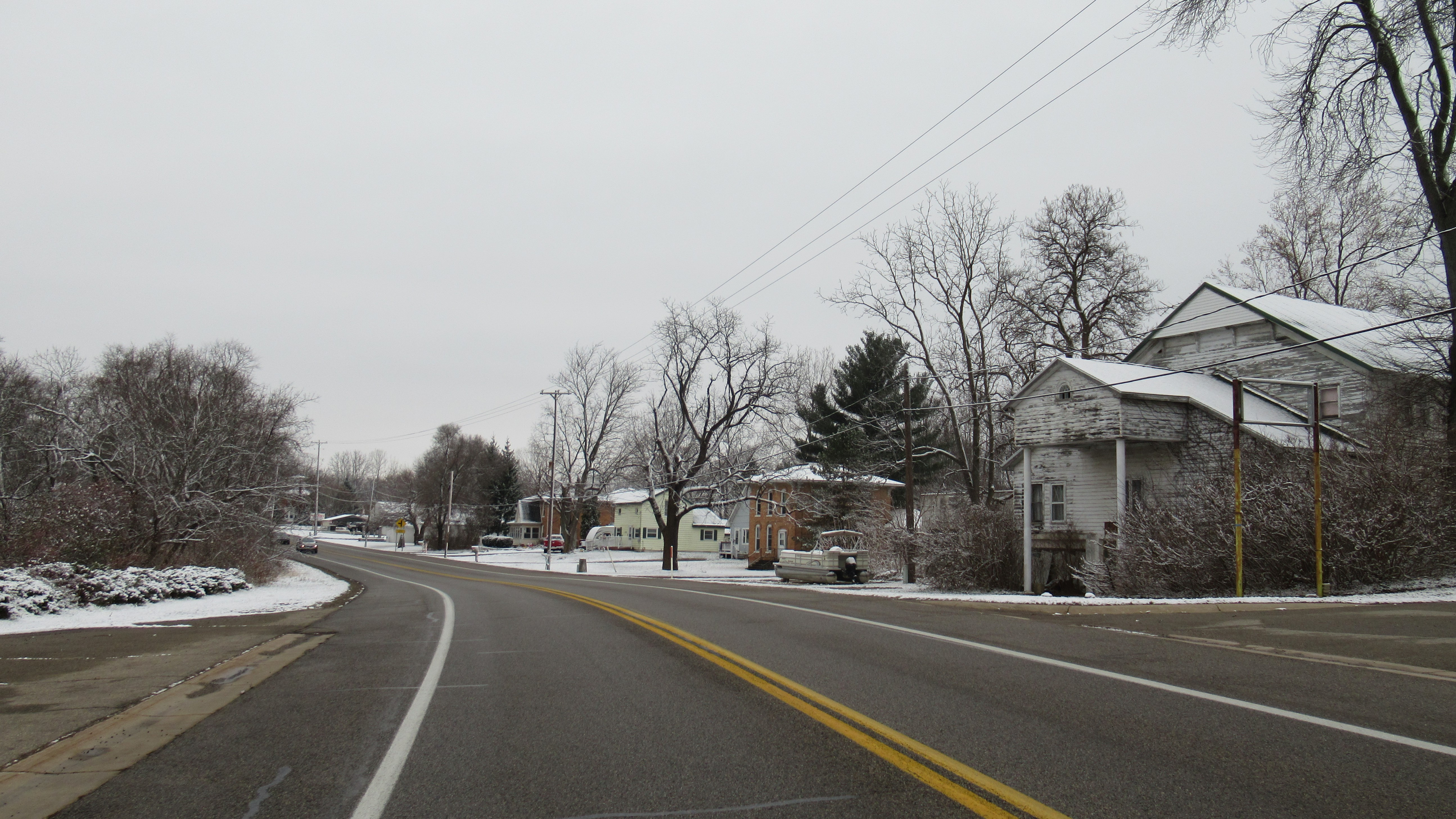
Looking west along U.S. Route 12

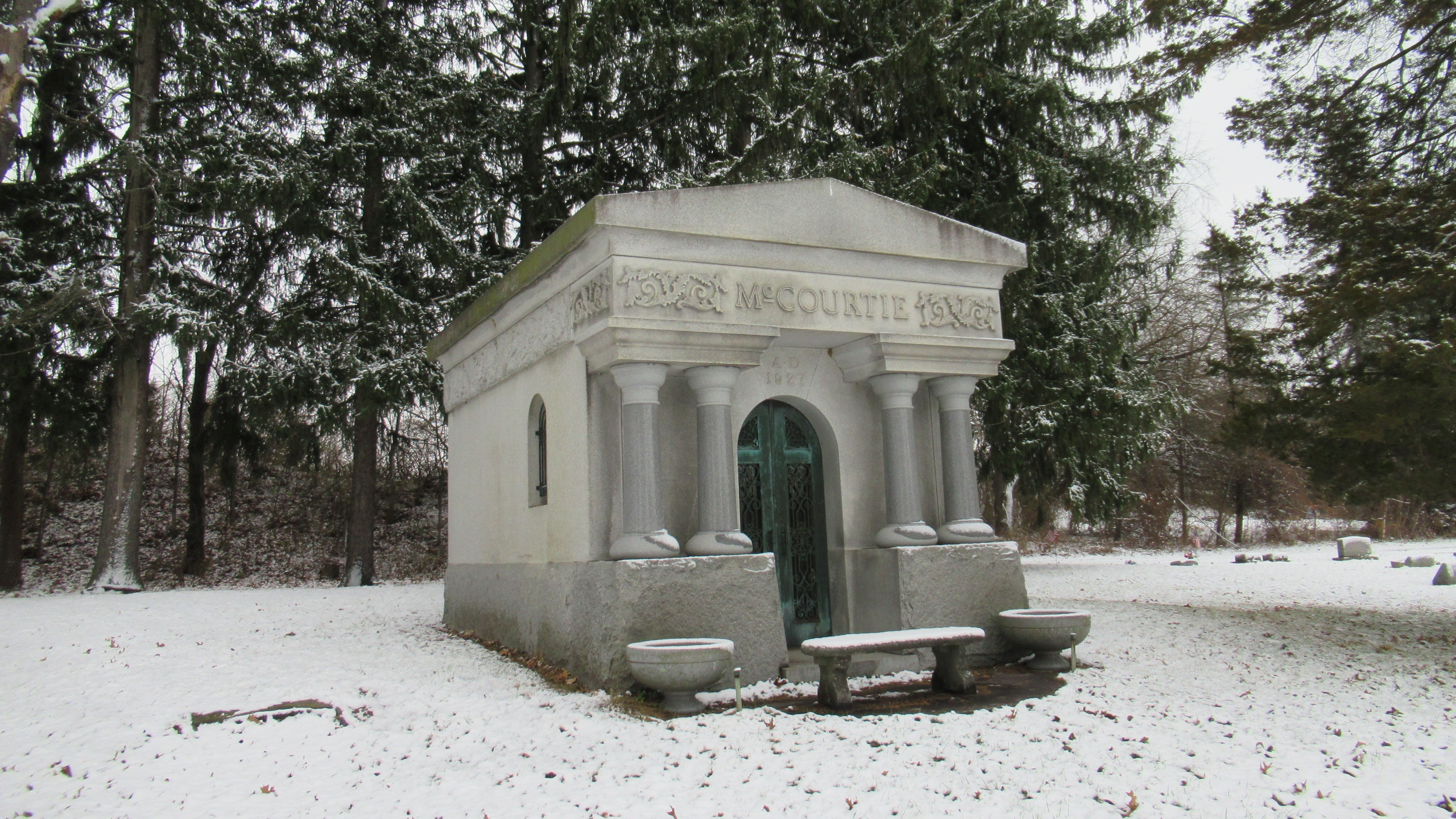
McCourtie Mausoleum

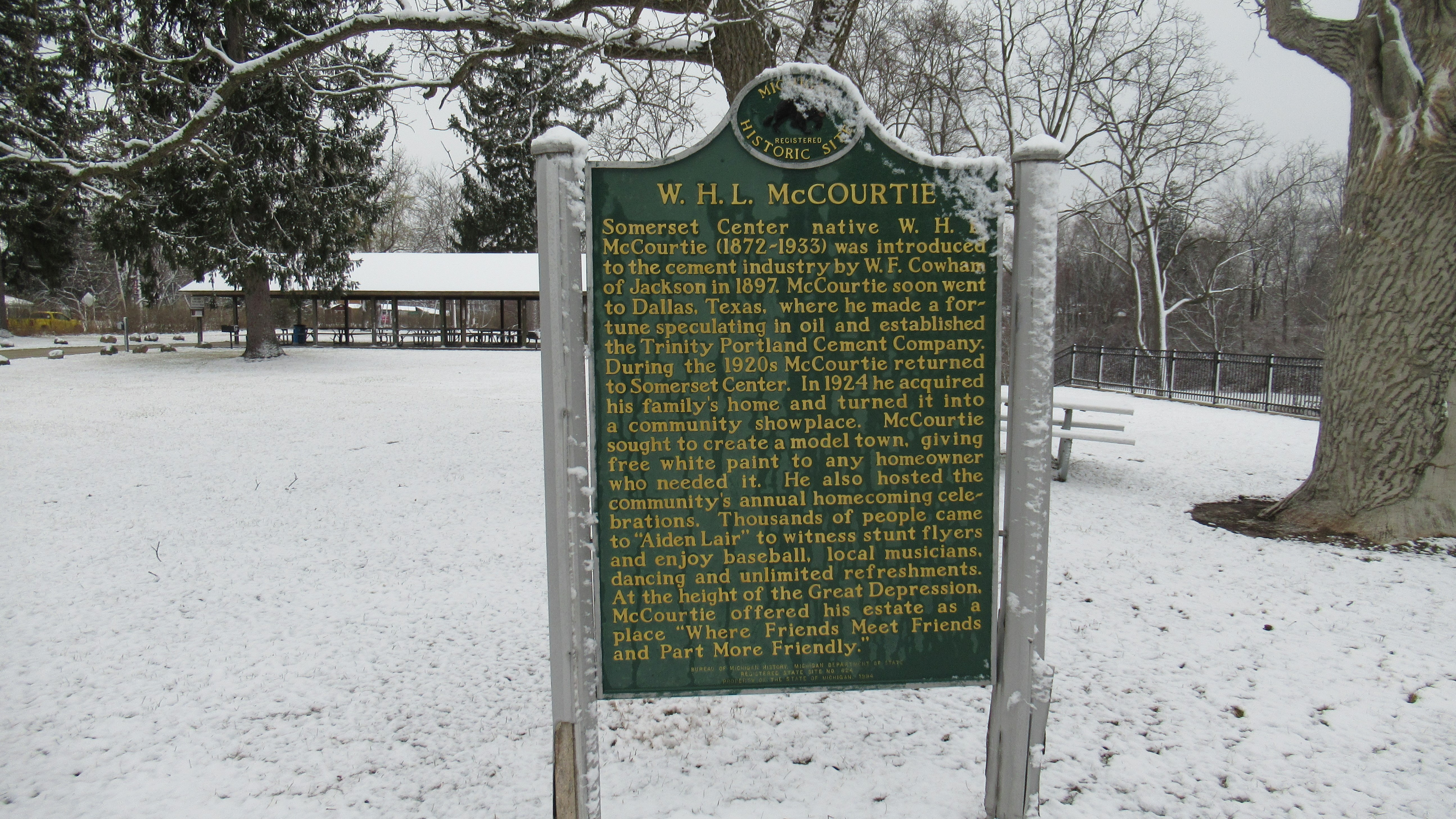
W. H. L. McCourtie historic marker

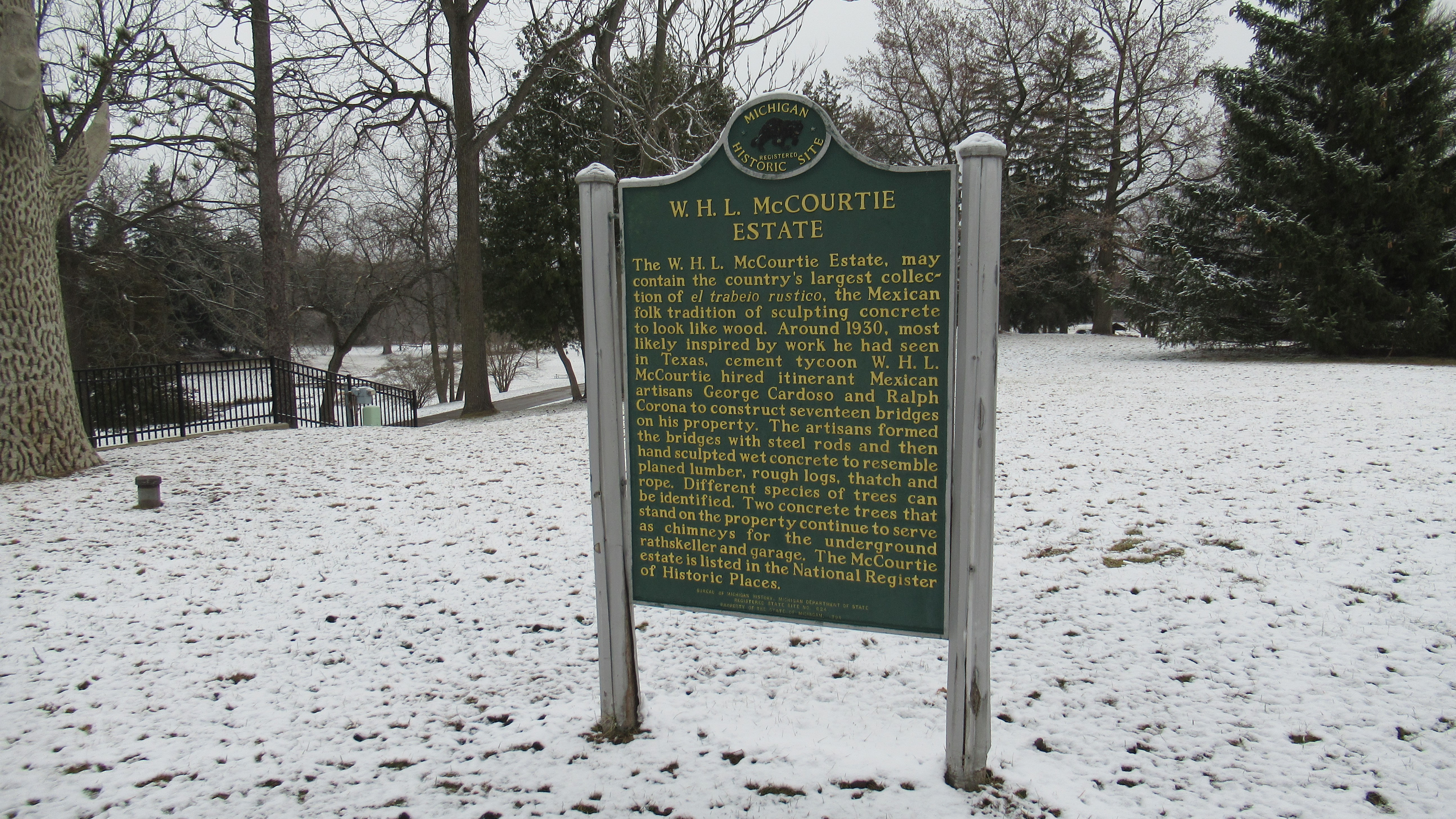
McCourtie Estate historic marker
