= Robert Cox (Michigan politician) =

American politician (1813–1890)

Member of the Michigan House of Representatives from the Hillsdale County 3rd district
- In office January 2, 1861 – December 31, 1862
- Preceded by: William W. Brewster
- Succeeded by: George A. Smith

Personal details
- Born: April 30, 1813 North Branch, New Jersey
- Died: June 1890 (aged 77) Wheatland Township, Michigan
- Party: Whig (until 1854); Republican (after 1854)

Robert Cox (April 30, 1813 – June 1890) was a Michigan politician.

== Early life ==
Cox was born on April 30, 1813, in the North Branch section of Branchburg, New Jersey. When Cox was young, he became a resident of New York. In 1829, Cox moved to Lenawee County, Michigan. In 1834 or 1835, he moved onto a farm in Wheatland Township, Hillsdale County, Michigan. Cox set out one of the first orchards in Wheatland Township, along with Harvey McGee and Lyman Pease. When Hunter Smith put a press into operation in Pittsford, Michigan, Cox and Zebulon Williams Sr., who also made an early orchard in the township, went and made their apples into cider there.

== Career ==
In 1845, Cox served as a justice of the peace. Before 1854, Cox was a member of the Whig Party. Afterwards, Cox was a Republican. On November 6, 1860, Cox served in the Michigan House of Representatives where he represented the Hillsdale County 3rd district from January 2, 1861 to December 31, 1862. In 1864, Cox served as a Wheatland Township highway commissioner, alongside Perry Knapp and Isaac Gates. In 1865, Cox served as Wheatland Township's sole highway commissioner. In 1868, Cox would again serve as highway commissioner with Perry Knapp. In the years 1870, 1873, and 1876, Cox again served as sole highway commissioner.

== Death ==
Cox died in June 1890 in Wheatland Township.
