= George A. Smith (Michigan politician) =

American politician

Member of the Michigan Senate from the 9th district
- In office January 7, 1885 – December 31, 1886
- Preceded by: Ezra L. Koon
- Succeeded by: W. Irving Babcock

Member of the Michigan Senate from the 12th district
- In office January 2, 1867 – December 31, 1868
- Preceded by: Richard J. Crego
- Succeeded by: Ezra L. Koon

Member of the Michigan House of Representatives from the Hillsdale County 3rd district
- In office January 7, 1863 – December 31, 1864
- Preceded by: Robert Cox
- Succeeded by: Albert B. Slocum

Personal details
- Born: March 8, 1825 Danbury, Connecticut
- Died: January 29, 1893 (aged 67) Somerset Township, Michigan
- Party: Republican

George A. Smith (March 8, 1825 – January 29, 1893) was a Michigan politician.

== Early life ==
George A. Smith was born on March 8, 1825, in Danbury, Connecticut. In 1839 or 1840, his father, Azariel Smith, settled on a farm in Somerset Township, Michigan, south of the village of Gambleville. George started living in Gambleville around 1854 or 1855.

== Career ==
Smith was a merchant. In 1860, Smith served as the supervisor of Somerset Township, a position his father Azariel held in 1841. On November 4, 1862, Smith was elected to the Michigan House of Representatives where he represented the Hillsdale County 3rd district from January 7, 1863, to December 31, 1864. On November 6, 1866, Smith was elected to the Michigan Senate where he represented the 12th district from January 2, 1867, to December 31, 1868. Sometime around 1879, Smith served as a postmaster in Somerset Township. On November 4, 1884, Smith was elected to the Michigan Senate where he represented the 9th district from January 7, 1885, to December 31, 1886.

== Personal life ==
George A. Smith had a son named Le Grand Smith who lived in Azariel Smith's old farm sometime around 1879.

== Death ==
Smith died on January 29, 1893, in Somerset Township.
