= Bawbeese =

Baw Beese Lake
- Location within the state of Michigan
- 41°53′58″N 84°36′04″W
- Location: Water Works Drive; Hillsdale Township, Michigan

Michigan State Historic Site
- Designated: 2017

Bawbeese was a Potawatomi village in 1830 located in what is today Hillsdale County, Michigan, United States. It was located on Baw Beese Lake.

== Sources ==
- Helen Hornbeck Tanner. Atlas of Great Lakes Indian History. (Norman: University of Oklahoma Press, 1987) p. 134.
