= Somerset Township, Michigan =

- Civil township
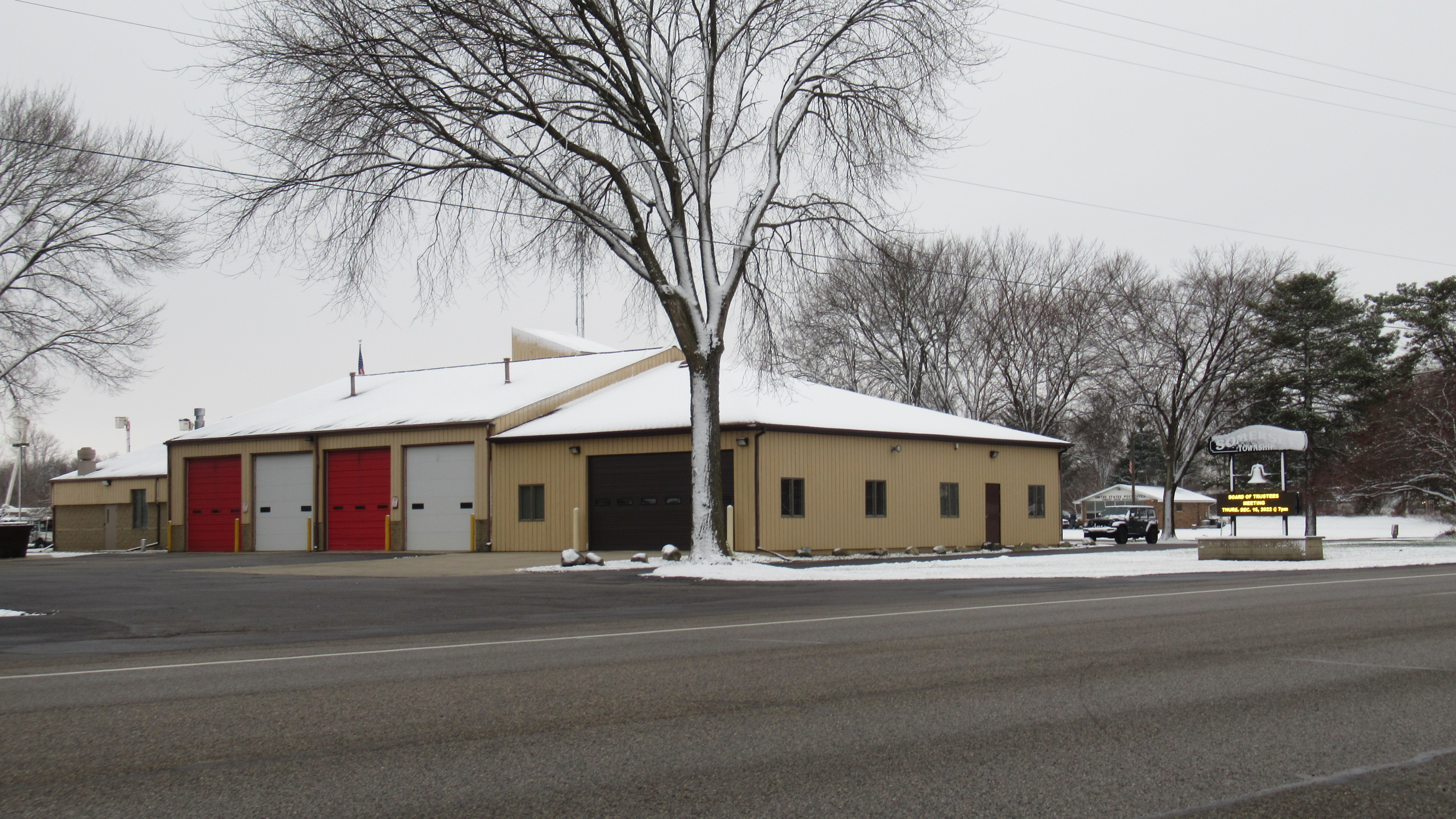
- Somerset Township Hall and Fire Department

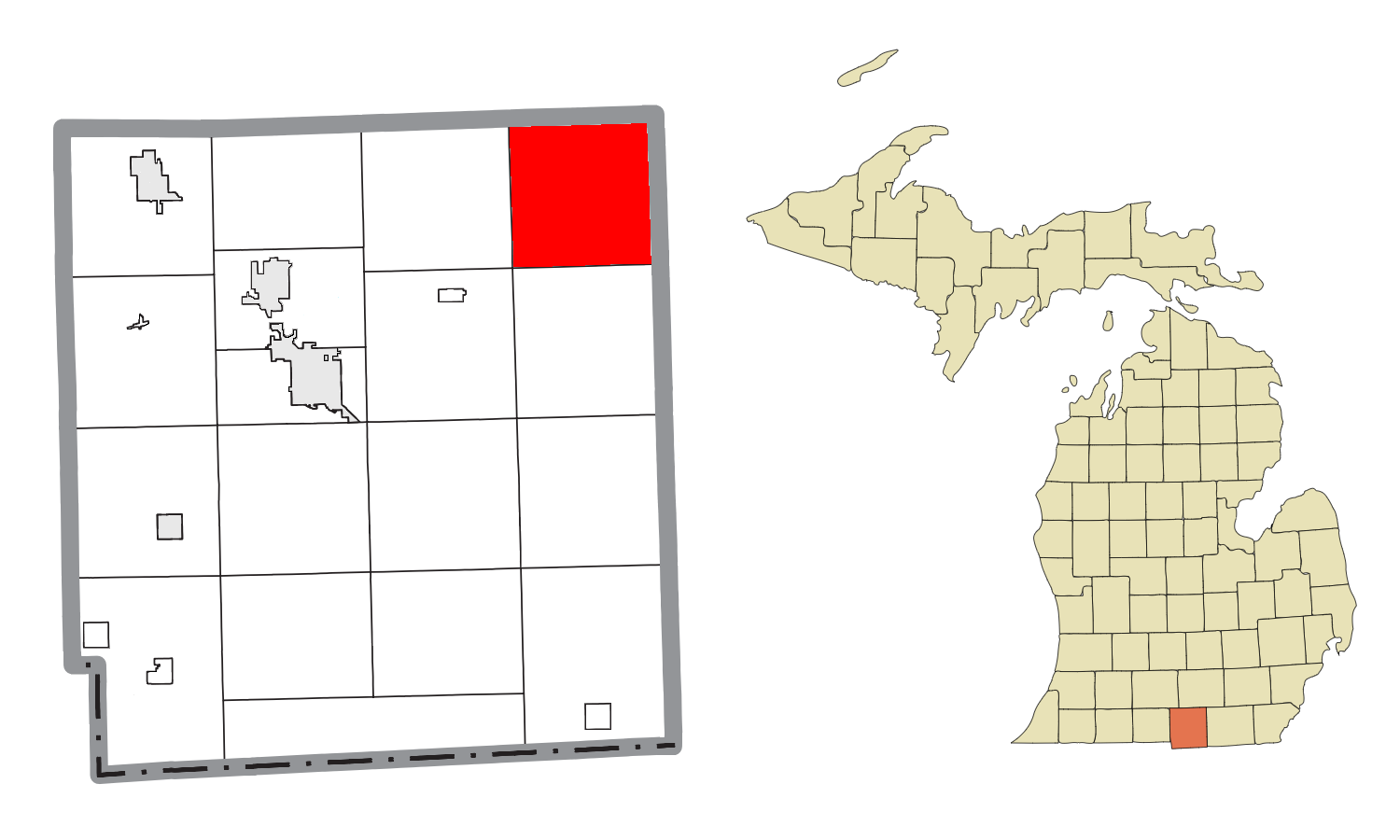
- Location within Hillsdale County

- Location within the state of Michigan Location within the United States
- Coordinates: 42°03′03″N 84°25′09″W
- Country: United States
- State: Michigan
- County: Hillsdale
- Established: 1837

Government
  - Supervisor: Timothy Shaw
  - Clerk: Mike Bohnet

Area
  - Total: 35.56 sq mi (92.10 km^{2})
  - Land: 33.41 sq mi (86.53 km^{2})
  - Water: 2.15 sq mi (5.57 km^{2})
- Elevation: 1,070 ft (326 m)

Population (2020)
  - Total: 4,532
  - Density: 135.6/sq mi (52.4/km^{2})
- Time zone: UTC-5 (Eastern (EST))
  - Summer (DST): UTC-4 (EDT)
- ZIP code(s): 49220 (Addison); 49233 (Cement City); 49249 (Jerome); 49281 (Somerset); 49282 (Somerset Center)
- Area code: 517
- FIPS code: 26-74560
- GNIS feature ID: 1627090
- Website: Official website

Somerset Township is a civil township of Hillsdale County in the U.S. state of Michigan. The population was 4,532 at the 2020 census.

== Communities ==
- Bakers is a historic settlement within the township. It served as a station along the Detroit, Toledo and Milwaukee Railroad and briefly had its own post office from October 20, 1897 until December 14, 1903.
- Jerome is an unincorporated community located within the township at 42°01′37″N 84°28′10″W. The community was formed when the Detroit, Hillsdale & Indiana Railroad built a line through the area in 1871. Jerome Smith platted the community and gave it his name. He also worked as a railroad agent and served as the first postmaster when the office began operating on April 26, 1871.
- Lake LeAnn is an unincorporated community and census-designated place within the township at 42°03′45″N 84°25′49″W.
- Somerset is an unincorporated community located along U.S. Route 12 at 42°02′54″N 84°22′36″W. Somerset was first settled by James D. Van Hoevenburg in 1832. He sold his farm to Thomas Gamble, who became the first postmaster when a post office began operating here on September 9, 1835. Originally part of Wheatland Township, the post office was named Wheatland then renamed Gambleville on October 17, 1837 when Somerset Township was created from the northern half of Wheatland Township. In 1841, the post office was renamed Somerset and moved to Somerset Center in a more centralized location in the township. The Gambleville post office was later restored and renamed to Somerset in 1898, and Somerset Center retained its own post office.
- Somerset Center is an unincorporated community located in the center of the township along U.S. Route 12 at 42°03′04″N 84°24′49″W. The community was settled as early as 1833 and named for its centralized location in the township. Its postal history is similar to Somerset to the east, while Somerset Center received its own post office on June 19, 1872.

== Geography ==
According to the U.S. Census Bureau, the township has a total area of 35.56 square miles (92.10 km^{2}), of which 33.41 square miles (86.53 km^{2}) is land and 2.15 square miles (5.57 km^{2}) (6.05%) is water.

The township contains numerous small lakes, as well as the 748-acre (303 ha) Somerset State Game Area. The Grand River, which is the state's longest river, has its source within the township.

=== Major highways ===
- US 12 (E. Chicago Road) runs east–west through the northern portion of the township.
- US 127 runs briefly through the township in the northeast corner.

== Demographics ==
As of the census of 2000, there were 4,277 people, 1,687 households, and 1,312 families residing in the township. The population density was 128.2 inhabitants per square mile (49.5/km^{2}). There were 2,161 housing units at an average density of 64.8 per square mile (25.0/km^{2}). The racial makeup of the township was 97.90% White, 0.37% African American, 0.21% Native American, 0.16% Asian, 0.05% Pacific Islander, 0.44% from other races, and 0.87% from two or more races. Hispanic or Latino of any race were 1.38% of the population.

There were 1,687 households, out of which 28.6% had children under the age of 18 living with them, 68.9% were married couples living together, 6.3% had a female householder with no husband present, and 22.2% were non-families. 18.6% of all households were made up of individuals, and 7.8% had someone living alone who was 65 years of age or older. The average household size was 2.53 and the average family size was 2.88.

In the township the population was spread out, with 23.0% under the age of 18, 5.7% from 18 to 24, 26.2% from 25 to 44, 30.3% from 45 to 64, and 14.9% who were 65 years of age or older. The median age was 42 years. For every 100 females, there were 101.7 males. For every 100 females age 18 and over, there were 99.8 males.

The median income for a household in the township was $48,529, and the median income for a family was $51,278. Males had a median income of $43,973 versus $29,244 for females. The per capita income for the township was $22,462. About 2.8% of families and 4.0% of the population were below the poverty line, including 1.8% of those under age 18 and 2.8% of those age 65 or over.

== Education ==
The township is served by four separate public school districts. The western portion of the township is served by North Adams-Jerome Schools, while the eastern portion is served by Addison Community Schools in Lenawee County. A very small portion of the northern edge of the township surrounding parts of Lake LeAnn are served by Hanover-Horton Schools to the north in Jackson County. Another very small portion of the northeast corner of the township is served by Columbia School District in Jackson County.

== Notable people ==
- George A. Smith, state senator and representative

== Images ==
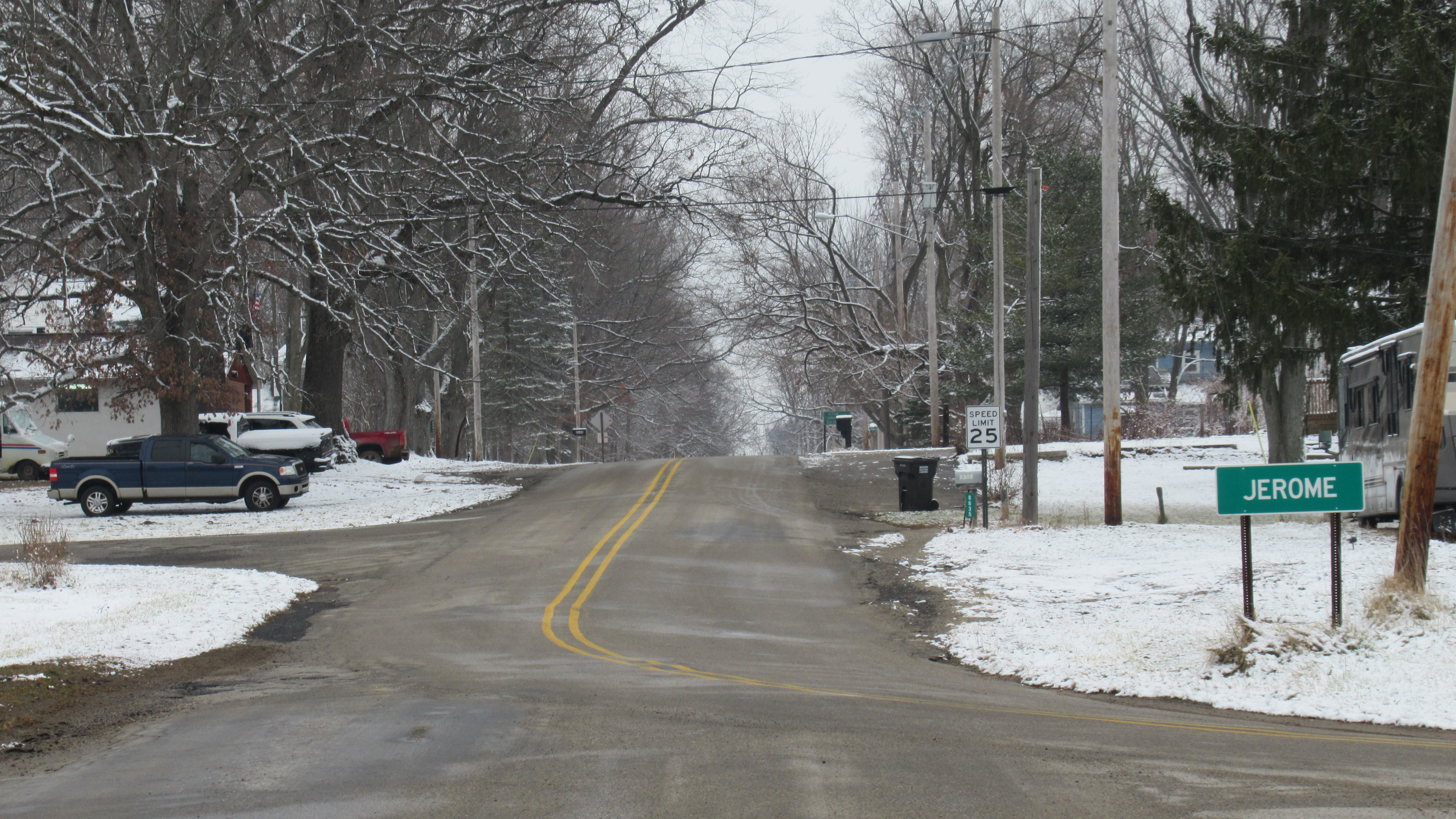
Community of Jerome

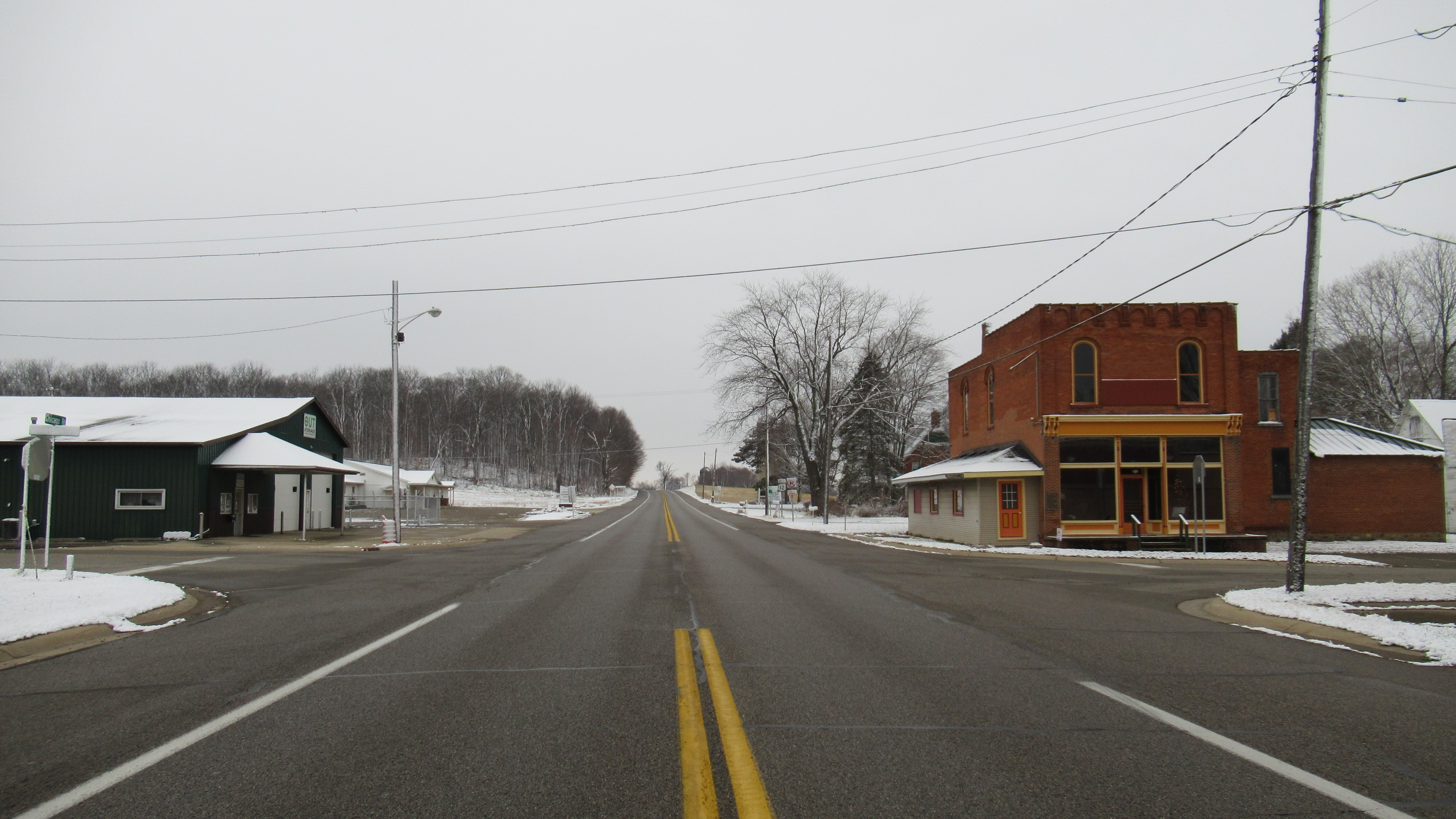
Community of Somerset

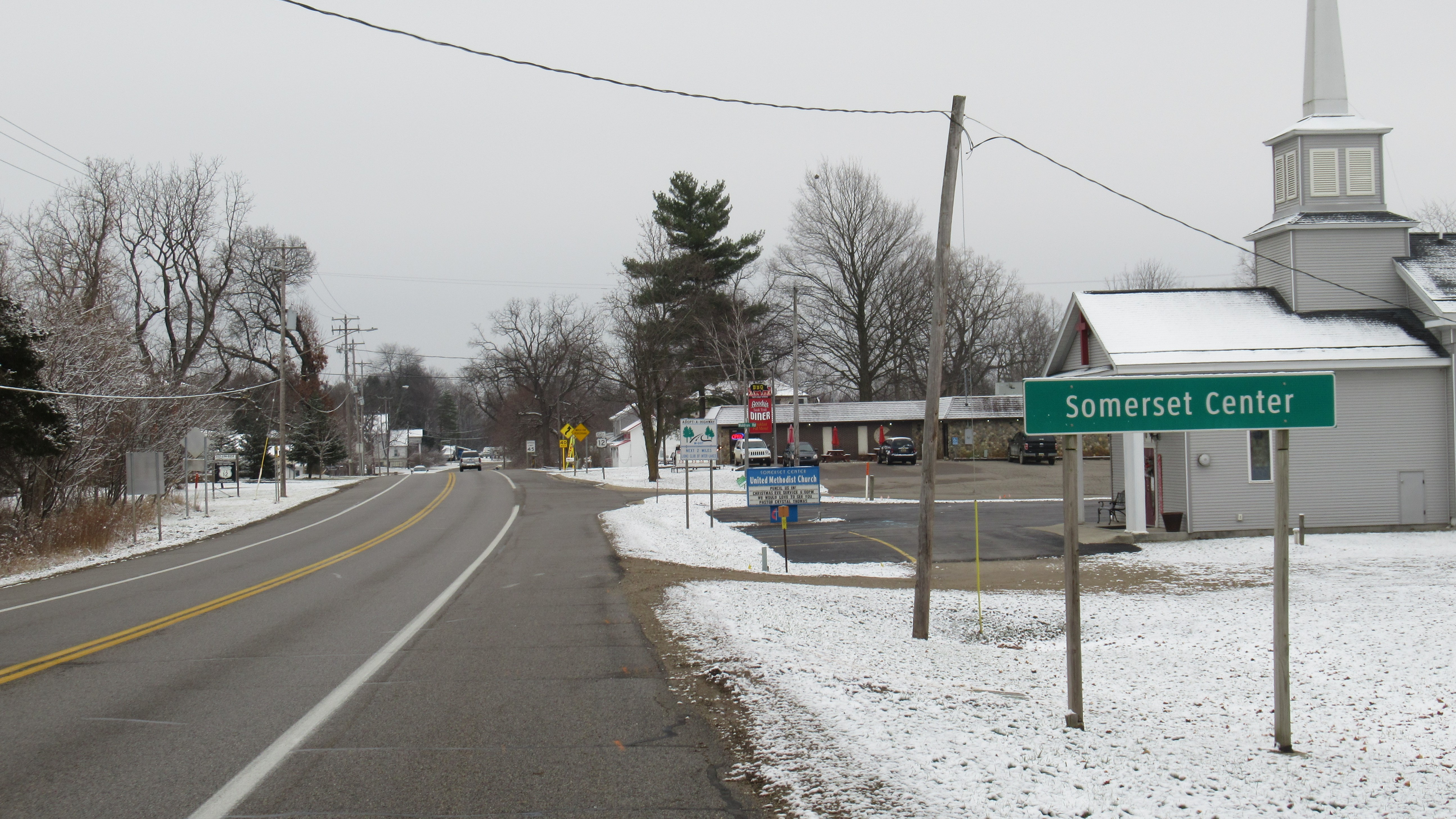
Community of Somerset Center

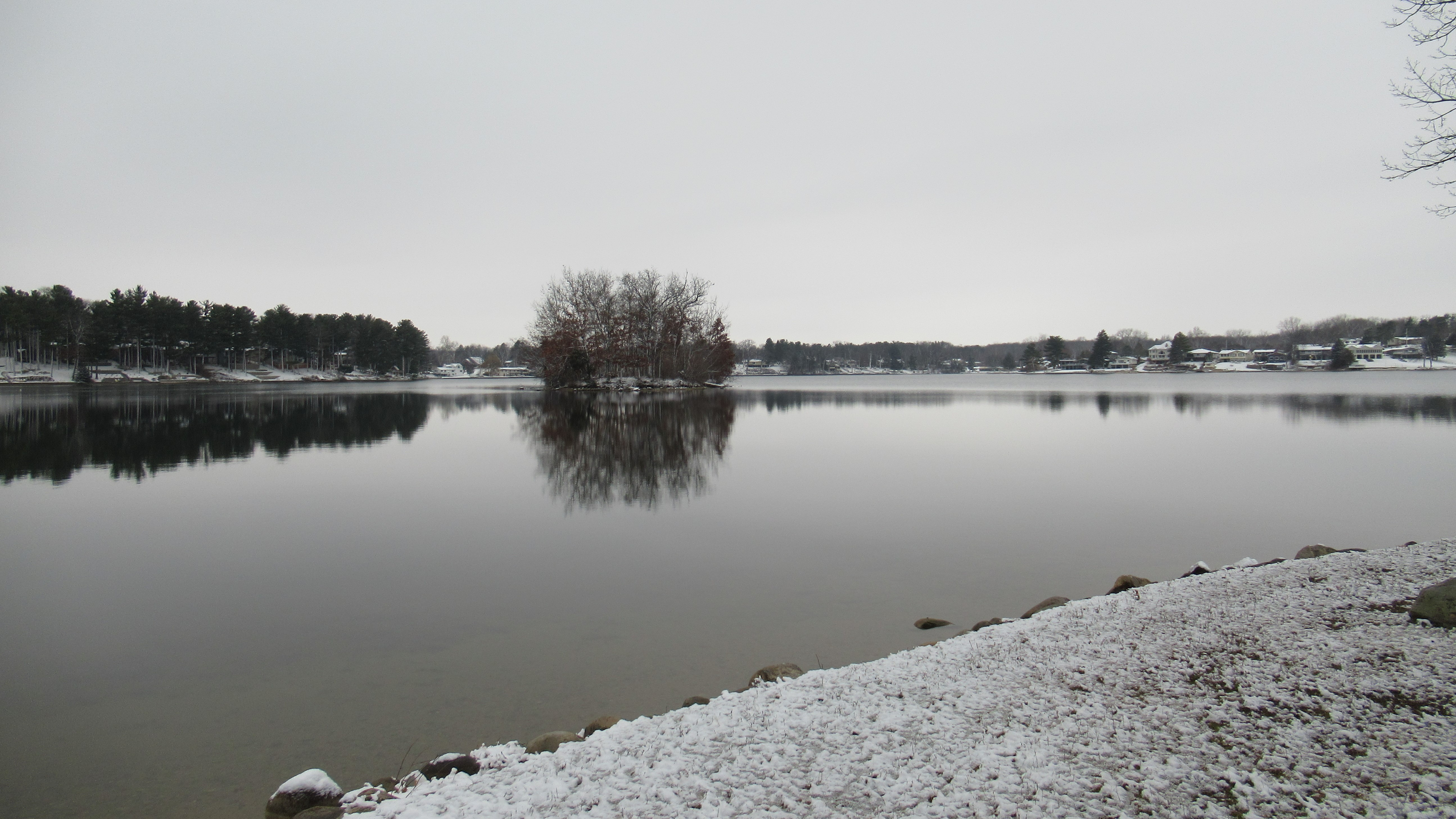
Community of Lake LeAnn
