= Jerome, Michigan =

- Unincorporated community
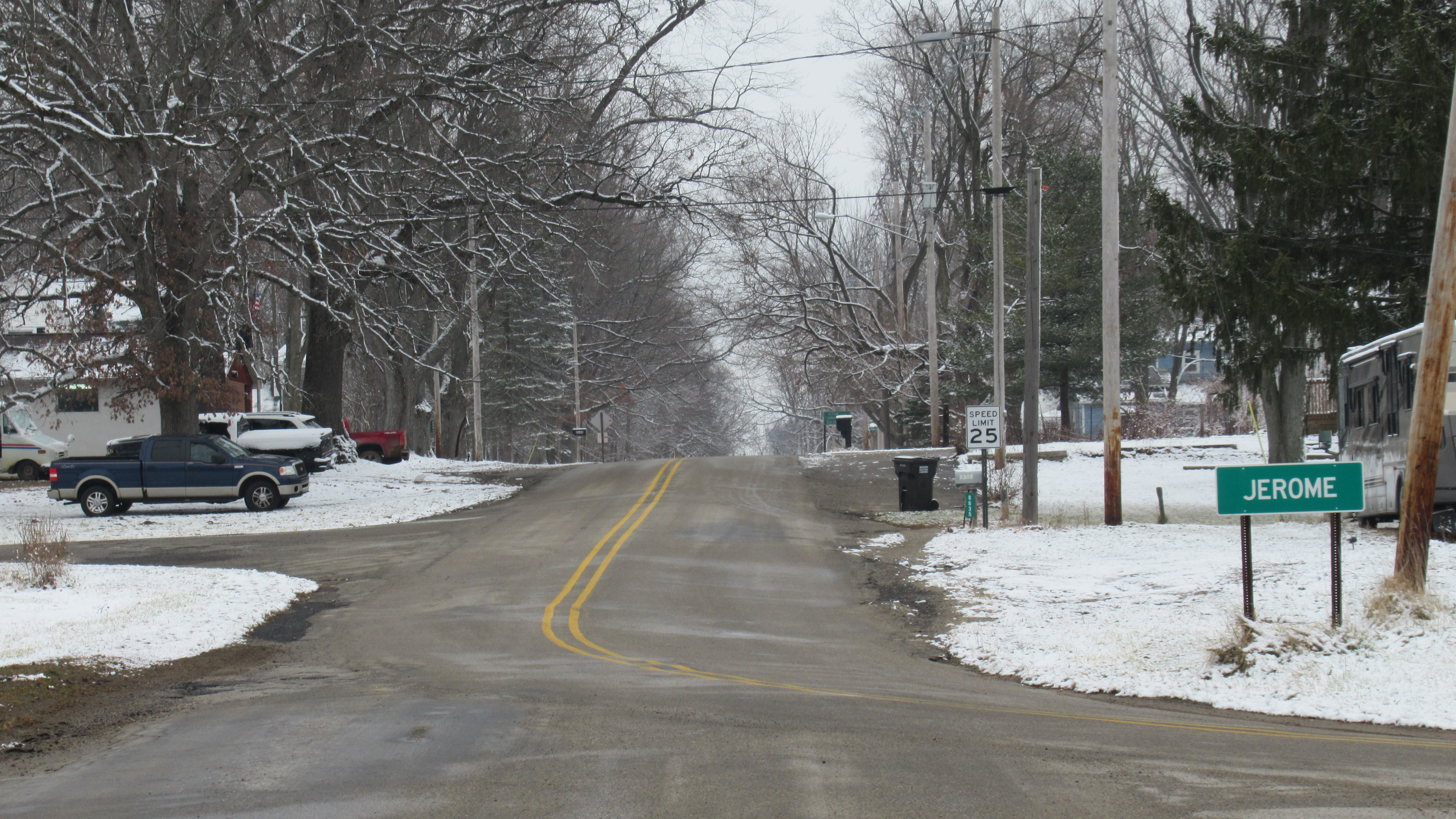
- Looking north along North Jerome Road

- Location within the state of Michigan Location within the United States
- Coordinates: 42°01′37″N 84°28′10″W
- Country: United States
- State: Michigan
- County: Hillsdale
- Township: Somerset
- Settled: 1871
- Elevation: 1,122 ft (342 m)
- Time zone: UTC-5 (Eastern (EST))
  - Summer (DST): UTC-4 (EDT)
- ZIP code(s): 49249
- Area code: 517
- GNIS feature ID: 629265

Jerome is an unincorporated community in Hillsdale County in the U.S. state of Michigan. The community is located within Somerset Township.

As an unincorporated community, Jerome has no legal autonomy of its own but does have its own post office with the 49249 ZIP Code.

== Geography ==
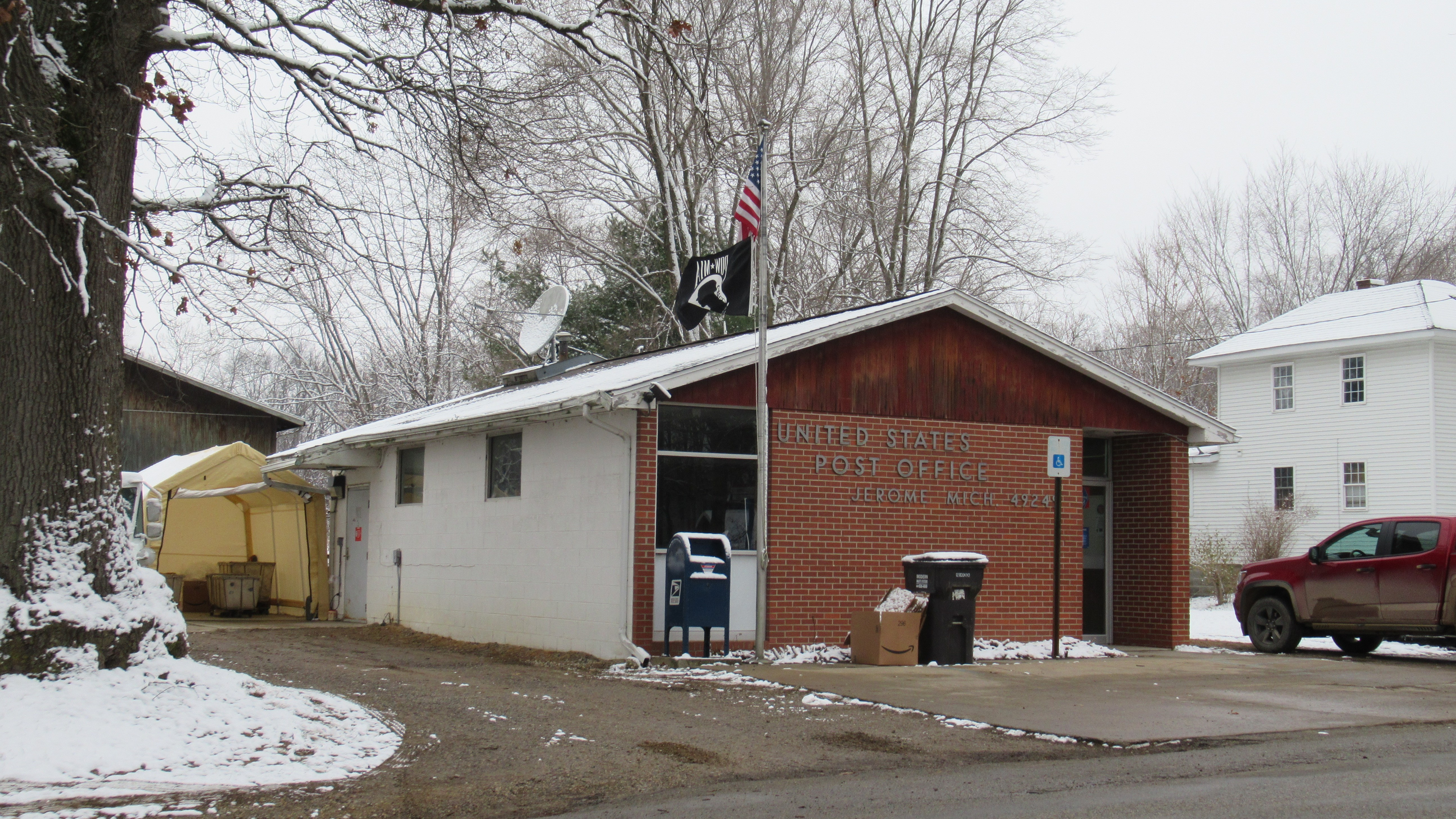
U.S. Post Office in Jerome

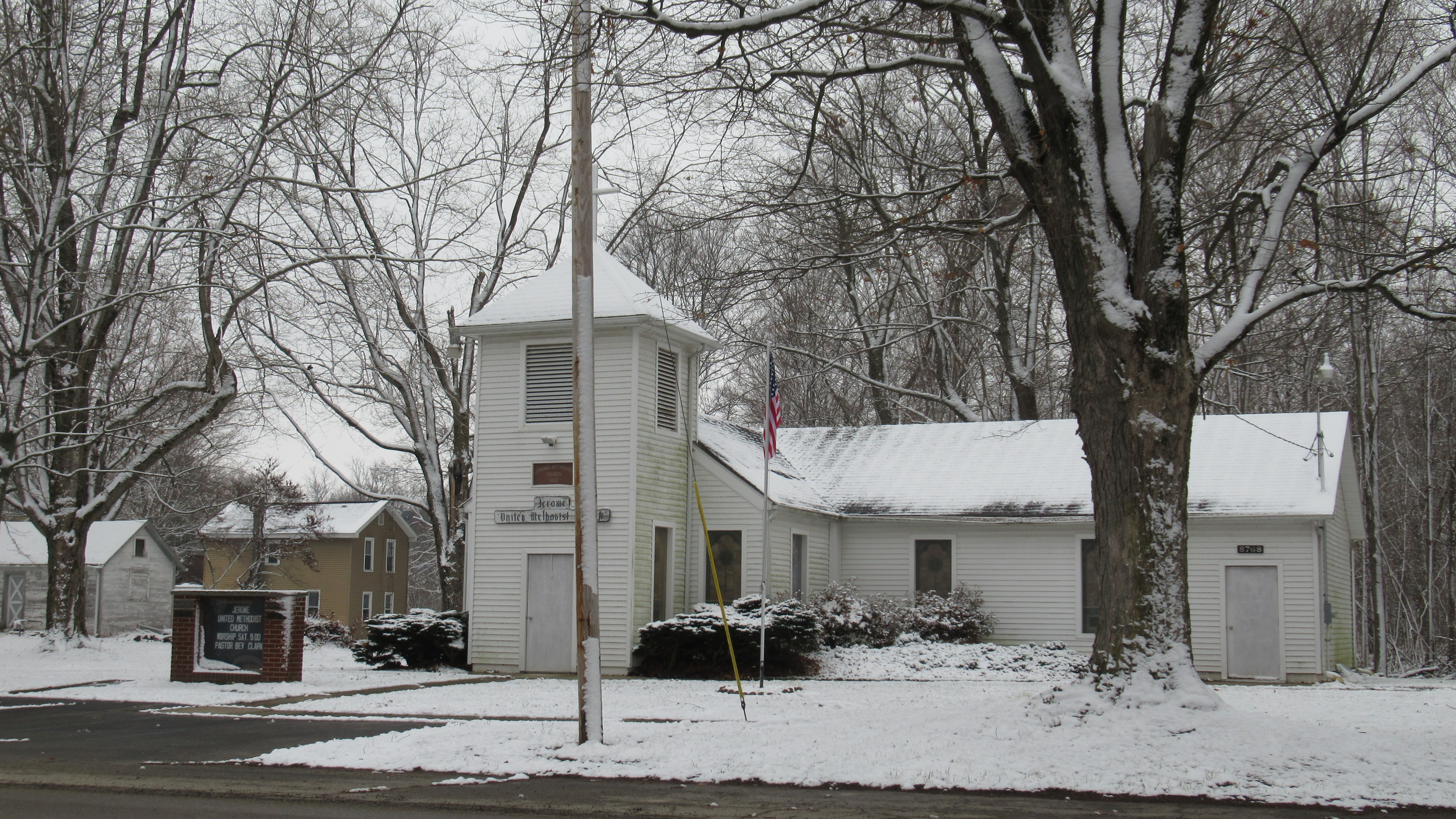
Jerome United Methodist Church

Jerome is a small community located in northeastern Hillsdale County in southeast Michigan. Located within Somerset Township, the community sits at an elevation of 1,122 feet (342 m).

The community is located about 3.0 miles (4.8 km) south of the county line with Jackson County. Jerome is not served by any major highways, although U.S. Route 12 (East Chicago Road) is about 2.0 miles (3.2 km) to the north. The nearest airport is the privately owned general aviation Davis Field to the south. Other nearby unincorporated communities include Moscow to the northwest, Somerset Center and the census-designated place of Lake LeAnn to the northeast, and Wheatland to the southeast. The village of North Adams is to the southwest.

Goose Lake is a 69-acre (28 ha) lake located just north of the center of the community. The lake is connected to numerous other lakes in the area by Goose Creek, which is part of the River Raisin watershed. The 20-acre (8.1 ha) Kathe & Cali Memorial County Park is located along the lake. The Bundy Hill Offroad Park is located just north of Jerome and is promoted as the largest privately owned off-road vehicle park in southeast Michigan.

Jerome has its own post office located in the center of the community at 8650 North Jerome Road. The post office uses the 49249 ZIP Code, which serves a much larger area. The ZIP Code serves the western portion of Somerset Township, as well as smaller portions of Adams Township, Moscow Township, and Wheatland Township. A small portion of Liberty Township in Jackson County to the north also uses the Jerome 49249 ZIP Code. The community is served by North Adams-Jerome Schools to the southwest in Adams Township.

== History ==
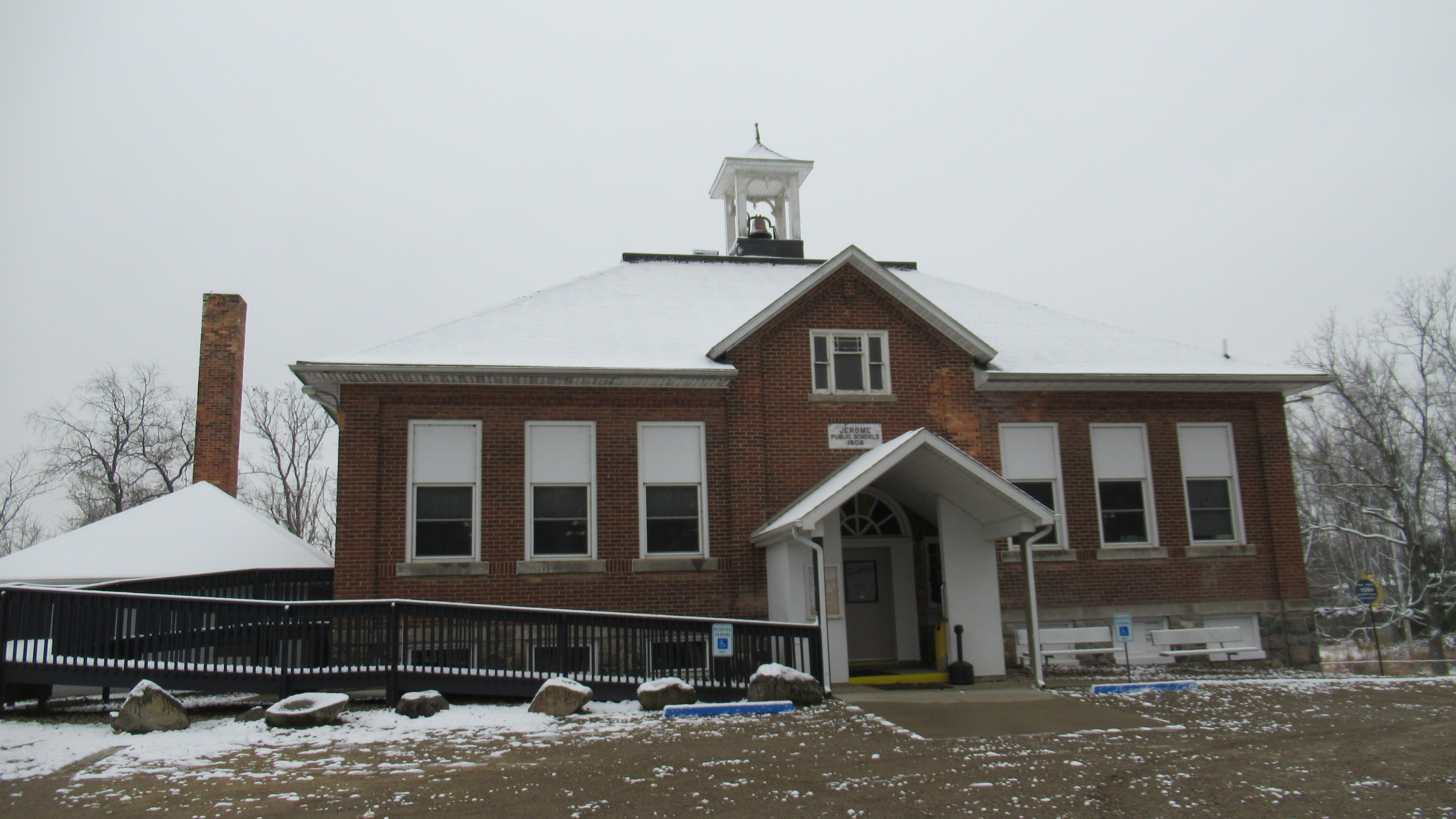
Defunct Jerome Public Schools

The Detroit, Hillsdale and Indiana Railroad branch of the Fort Wayne, Jackson and Saginaw Railroad began building rail lines through the forested area in western Somerset Township in 1869. The area was sparsely developed but was quickly settled in anticipation of the newfound railway. A train depot was built, and this allowed for the selling of land for a potential new community. A new community was officially platted by landowner Jerome Smith on April 18, 1871, who named the community after himself. On the same date, the community also received a post office named Jerome, and Smith himself served as the first postmaster while also working as an agent for the railroad. The post office has remained in continuous operation. The train depot was also named Jerome and soon became part of the Lake Shore and Michigan Southern Railway. Jerome developed rapidly and appeared along the railway on an 1872 map of Somerset Township.

Jerome developed as a farming and mercantile community, using the new railway to ship its grain and other products. Along with the train depot and post office, numerous businesses began operating in Jerome. By 1879, the community grew to include a boarding house, four general stores, meat market, two millineries, shoeshop, blacksmith, copper manufacturer, physician, schoolhouse, hotel, Independent Order of Odd Fellows hall, and a congregational church. In the early 1890s, the Detroit, Toledo & Milwaukee Railroad also built a line through the area but did not build a train depot in Jerome. The two rail lines crossed each other here but did not have an interchange at this point, although access and services to the Detroit, Toledo & Milwaukee Railroad may have been available in Jerome. The two rail lines appear running through Jerome on an 1894 map of Somerset Township. The Jerome Creamery Company was established in 1899 and used the railways to transport its products as far north as Pontiac.

In 1906, a large brick schoolhouse was built along Harrison Street, and it served as the sole building for Jerome Public Schools. The school originally served all grades as an independent school district until it consolidated with the school district in North Adams to form North Adams-Jerome Schools in the early 1950s. When the districts merged, the schoolhouse in Jerome was converted into an elementary school, and students went to North Adams to continue their education after fifth grade. The Jerome Public Schools building closed by the end of the 1960s, and the building now serves as a community center and public park. Both railway lines running through the community were also disestablished and eventually removed entirely, and Jerome is no longer served by any railroads.
