= Moscow Township, Michigan =

- Civil township
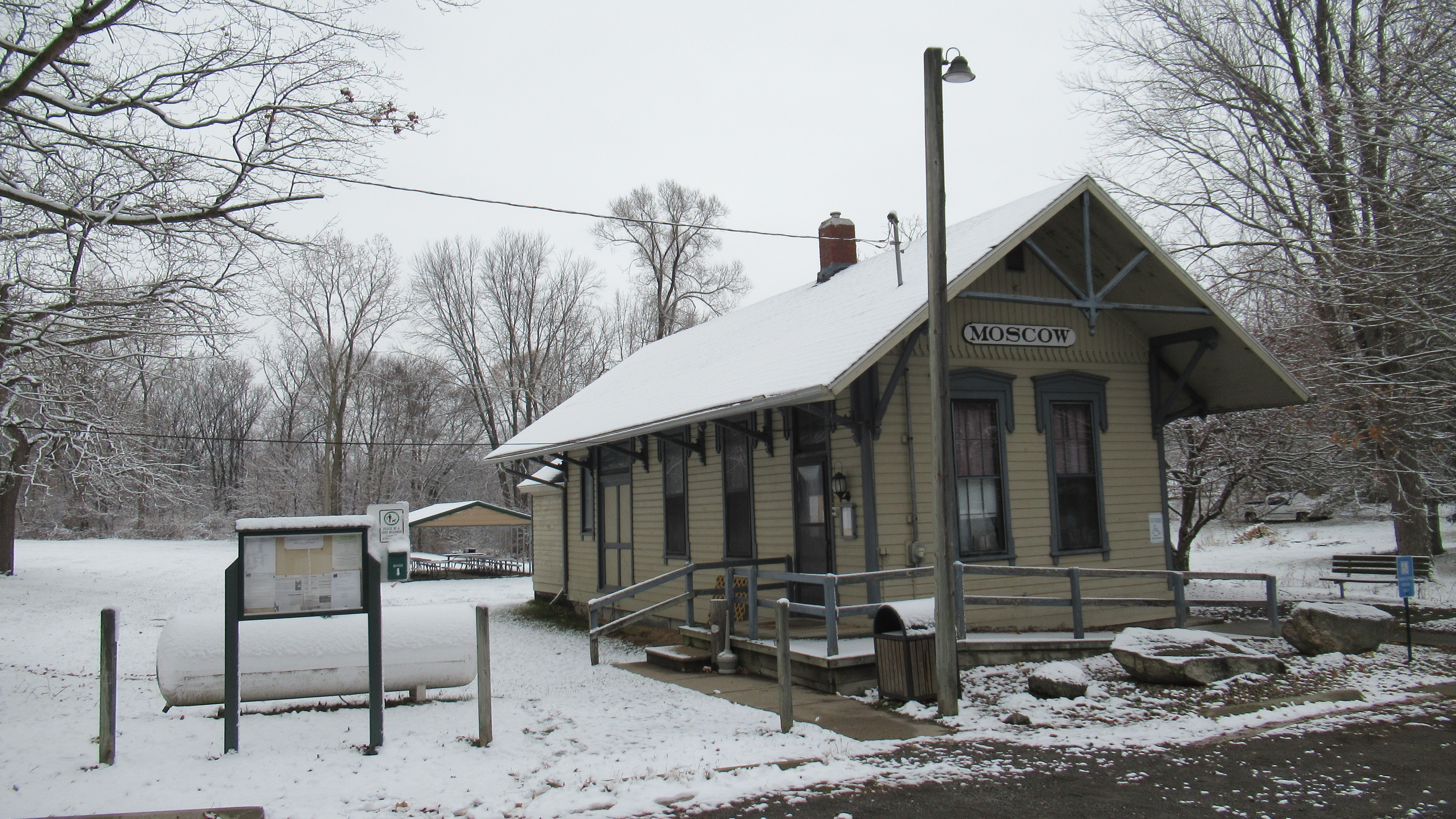
- Moscow Township Hall

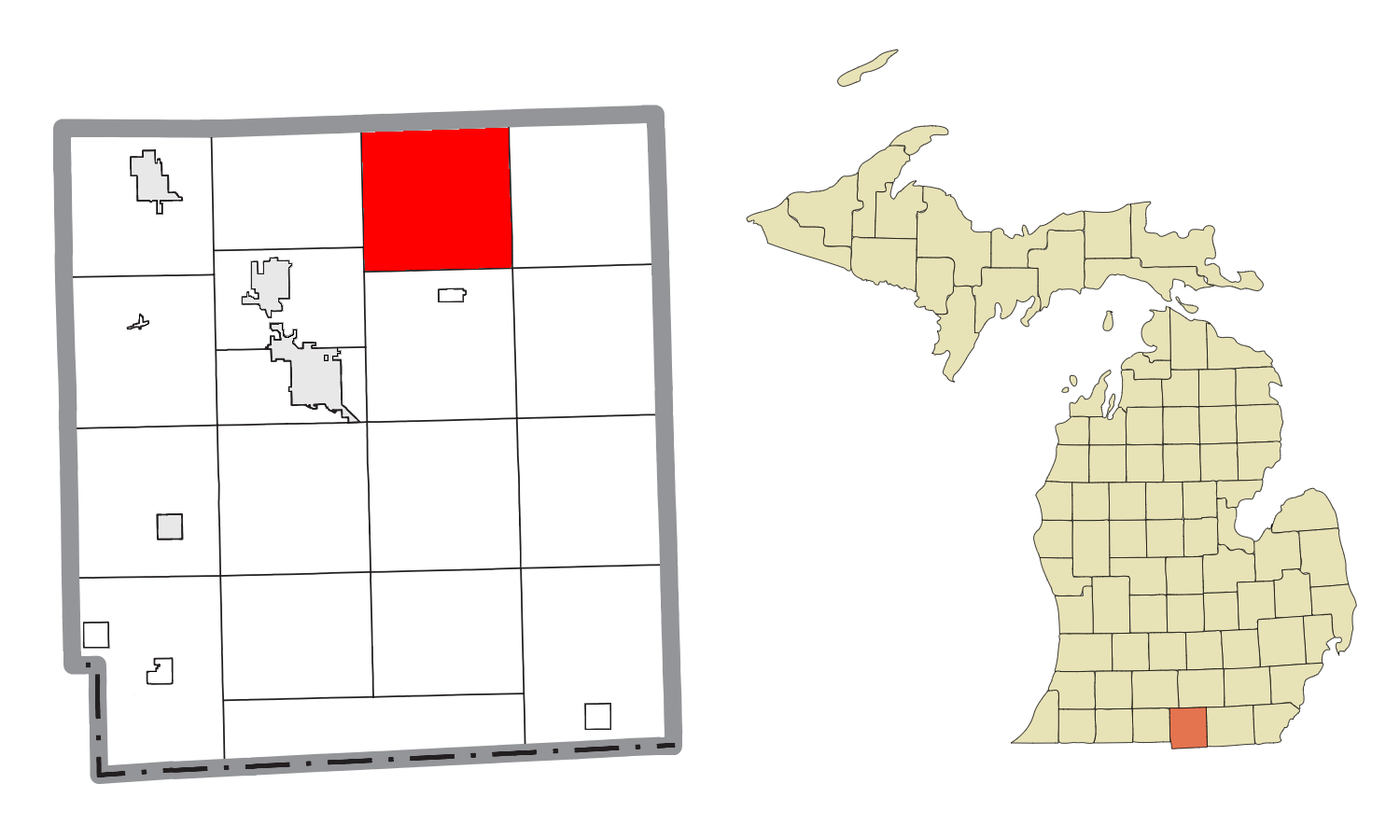
- Location within Hillsdale County

- Location within the state of Michigan Location within the United States
- Coordinates: 42°01′52″N 84°31′35″W
- Country: United States
- State: Michigan
- County: Hillsdale
- Established: 1835

Government
  - Supervisor: William Petrie
  - Clerk: Linda Waldron

Area
  - Total: 35.43 sq mi (91.76 km^{2})
  - Land: 35.15 sq mi (91.04 km^{2})
  - Water: 0.28 sq mi (0.73 km^{2})
- Elevation: 1,142 ft (348 m)

Population (2020)
  - Total: 1,467
  - Density: 41.8/sq mi (16.1/km^{2})
- Time zone: UTC-5 (Eastern (EST))
  - Summer (DST): UTC-4 (EDT)
- ZIP code(s): 49241 (Hanover); 49246 (Horton); 49249 (Jerome); 49250 (Jonesville); 49257 (Moscow)
- Area code: 517
- FIPS code: 26-55640
- GNIS feature ID: 1626769

Moscow Township is a civil township of Hillsdale County in the U.S. state of Michigan. The population was 1,467 at the 2020 census.

== Communities ==
- Moscow is an unincorporated community located within the township along U.S. Route 12 at 42°02′58″N 84°30′36″W. It was first settled by Peter Benson in 1831 and by Judge Lyman Blackmar in 1832. A post office opened on May 7, 1834 under the name Moscow, which was chosen by Alonzo Kies who came here from a community named Moscow in Cayuga County, New York. Moscow uses the 49257 ZIP Code, which is used for post office box services only and has no physical post office in the community.

== Geography ==
According to the U.S. Census Bureau, the township has a total area of 35.43 square miles (91.76 km^{2}), of which 35.15 square miles (91.04 km^{2}) is land and 0.28 square miles (0.73 km^{2}) (0.79%) is water.

The headwaters for the south branch of the Kalamazoo River begin in the southern portion of the township.

=== Major highways ===
- US 12 (E. Chicago Road) runs east–west through the center of the township.

== Demographics ==
As of the census of 2000, there were 1,445 people, 522 households, and 410 families residing in the township. The population density was 41.1 inhabitants per square mile (15.9/km^{2}). There were 554 housing units at an average density of 15.8 per square mile (6.1/km^{2}). The racial makeup of the township was 98.41% White, 0.62% African American, 0.07% Native American, 0.28% Asian, 0.14% Pacific Islander, 0.07% from other races, and 0.42% from two or more races. Hispanic or Latino of any race were 0.97% of the population.

There were 522 households, out of which 36.2% had children under the age of 18 living with them, 67.6% were married couples living together, 6.3% had a female householder with no husband present, and 21.3% were non-families. 17.4% of all households were made up of individuals, and 7.5% had someone living alone who was 65 years of age or older. The average household size was 2.76 and the average family size was 3.10.

In the township the population was spread out, with 27.7% under the age of 18, 7.6% from 18 to 24, 28.6% from 25 to 44, 25.0% from 45 to 64, and 11.1% who were 65 years of age or older. The median age was 37 years. For every 100 females, there were 104.7 males. For every 100 females age 18 and over, there were 105.7 males.

The median income for a household in the township was $44,740, and the median income for a family was $49,464. Males had a median income of $36,705 versus $25,714 for females. The per capita income for the township was $18,682. About 2.7% of families and 4.2% of the population were below the poverty line, including 3.0% of those under age 18 and 3.7% of those age 65 or over.

== Education ==
The township is served by three separate public school districts. The southeast portion of the township is served by North Adams-Jerome Schools, while the north and west portions of the township is served by Jonesville Community Schools. Very small portions of the northern edge of the township are served by Hanover-Horton Schools to the north in Jackson County.

== Images ==
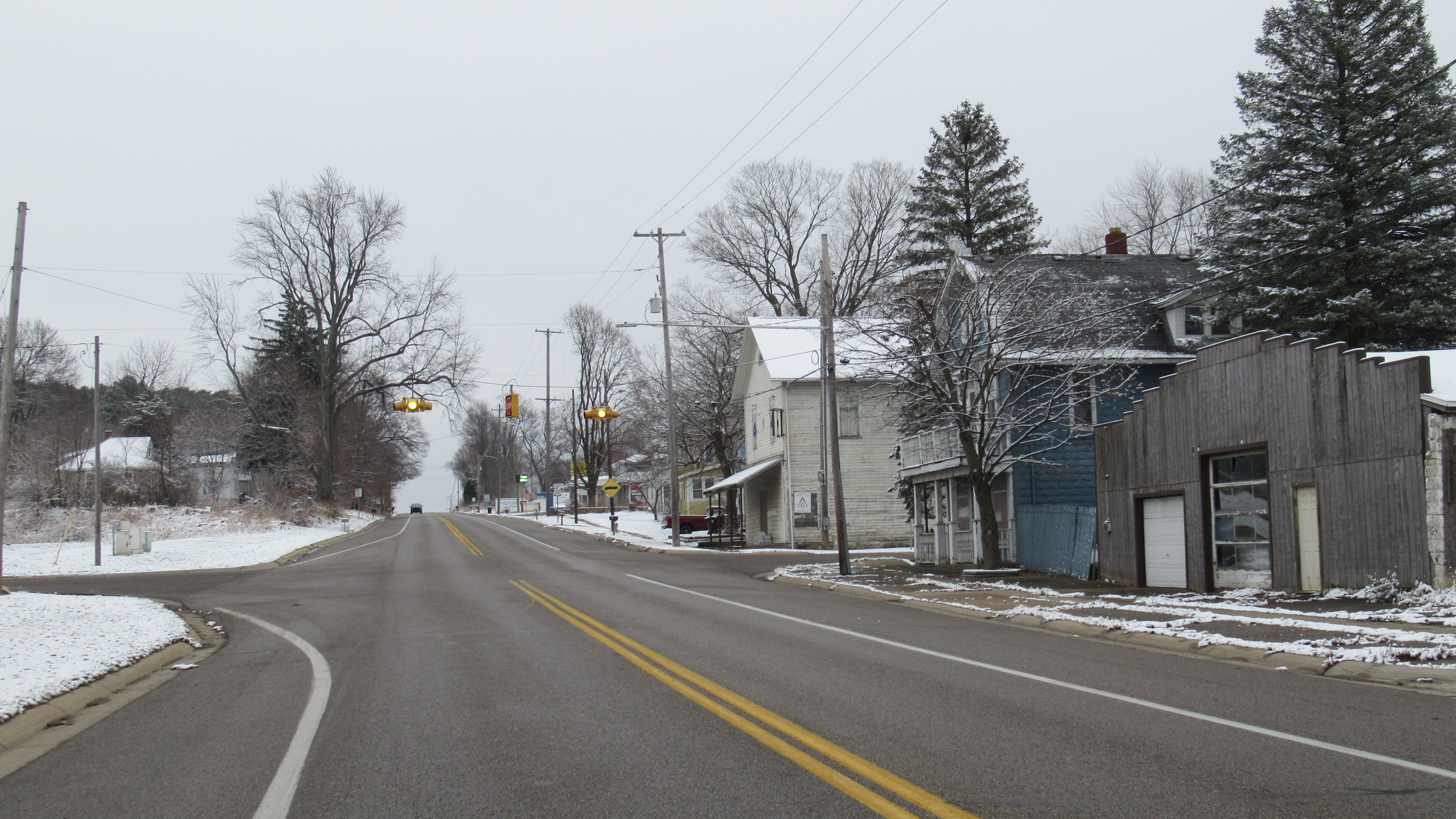
Unincorporated community of Moscow

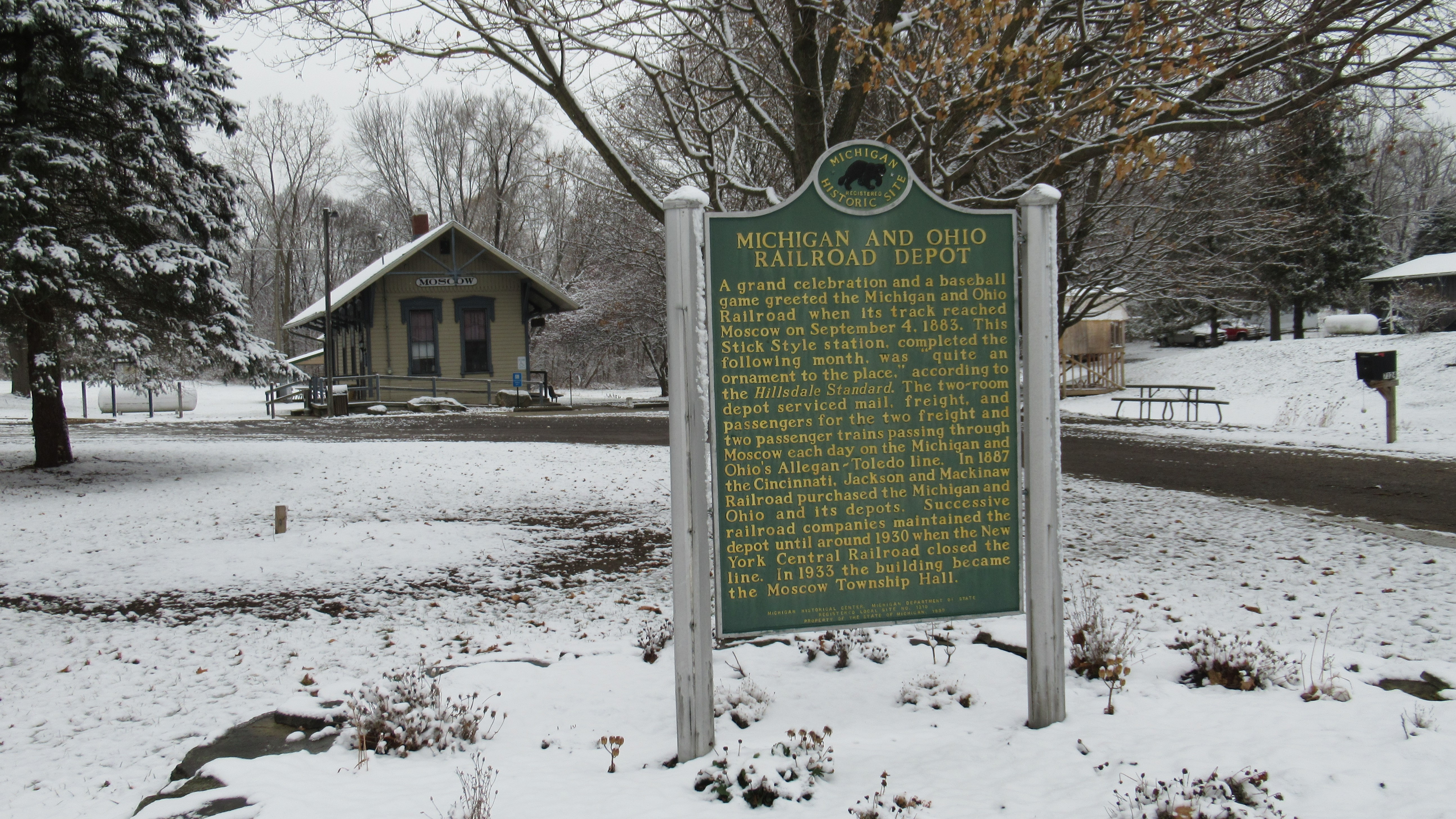
Michigan and Ohio Railroad Depot
