= Hillsdale County, Michigan =

County in Michigan, United States

- County
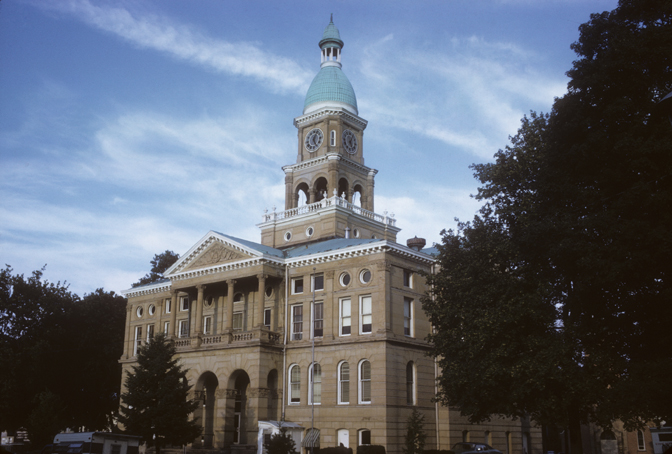
- Hillsdale County Courthouse in Hillsdale

- Location within the U.S. state of Michigan
- Coordinates: 41°53′N 84°35′W
- Country: United States
- State: Michigan
- Founded: 1835
- Seat: Hillsdale
- Largest city: Hillsdale

Area
  - Total: 607 sq mi (1,570 km^{2})
  - Land: 598 sq mi (1,550 km^{2})
  - Water: 8.9 sq mi (23 km^{2}) 1.5%

Population (2020)
  - Total: 45,746
  - Estimate (2025): 45,738 ▼
  - Density: 76/sq mi (29/km^{2})
- Time zone: UTC−5 (Eastern)
  - Summer (DST): UTC−4 (EDT)
- Congressional district: 5th
- Website: https://hillsdalecounty.gov/

Hillsdale County is a county located in the U.S. state of Michigan. As of the 2020 Census, the population was 45,746. The county seat is Hillsdale. Hillsdale County is the only county in Michigan to border both Indiana and Ohio. Due to an angle in the state's border with Ohio, Hillsdale County has the southernmost point in Michigan. Hillsdale County is conterminous with the Hillsdale, MI Micropolitan Statistical Area. The county is the home of Hillsdale College, a private liberal-arts college. The Hillsdale County Courthouse was designed by Claire Allen, a prominent southern Michigan architect.

== History ==
The county is named for its rolling terrain. It was described by action of the Michigan Territorial legislature in 1829, and was organized six years later. See List of Michigan county name etymologies.

Hillsdale County was a New England settlement; its early settlers came from the northern coastal colonies – "Yankees", descended from the English Puritans who emigrated from the Old World in the 1600s. There was a wave of such settlers into the Northwest Territory during the early 1800s, many traveling on the newly completed Erie Canal, and made safe by the conclusion of the Black Hawk War. They brought with them a passion for education, establishing many schools. Many were abolitionists.

== Geography ==
According to the US Census Bureau, the county has a total area of 607 square miles (1,570 km^{2}), of which 598 square miles (1,550 km^{2}) is land and 8.9 square miles (23 km^{2}) (1.5%) is water. Hillsdale is the only county in Michigan to have a land border with two other states – Ohio and Indiana. The headwaters of two St. Joseph Rivers rise in Hillsdale County: the St. Joseph River (Lake Michigan) and the St. Joseph River (Maumee River).

=== Parks ===
- McCourtie Park
- Slayton Arboretum

=== Adjacent counties ===
- Jackson County (northeast)
- Calhoun County (northwest)
- Lenawee County (east)
- Branch County (west)
- Fulton County, Ohio (southeast)
- Williams County, Ohio (south)
- Steuben County, Indiana (southwest)

== Climate ==
Hillsdale County experiences four distinct seasons. July is the hottest month with an average high of 82 °F or 27.8 °C and January the coldest with an average high of 29 °F or −1.7 °C. June is the wettest month with 4.29 inches or 109.0 millimetres of rain on average.

Climate data for Hillsdale, Michigan
Month	Jan	Feb	Mar	Apr	May	Jun	Jul	Aug	Sep	Oct	Nov	Dec	Year
Mean daily maximum °F (°C)	29 (−2)	33 (1)	43 (6)	56 (13)	68 (20)	78 (26)	82 (28)	80 (27)	72 (22)	60 (16)	46 (8)	34 (1)	57 (14)
Mean daily minimum °F (°C)	13 (−11)	14 (−10)	24 (−4)	35 (2)	45 (7)	55 (13)	59 (15)	57 (14)	49 (9)	38 (3)	29 (−2)	19 (−7)	36 (2)
Average precipitation inches (mm)	2.10 (53)	1.82 (46)	2.77 (70)	3.39 (86)	3.82 (97)	4.29 (109)	3.54 (90)	3.70 (94)	3.71 (94)	2.82 (72)	3.07 (78)	2.66 (68)	37.69 (957)
Source: weather.com

== Demographics ==
Historical population
Census	Pop.	Note	%±
1840	7,240		—
1850	16,159		123.2%
1860	25,675		58.9%
1870	31,684		23.4%
1880	32,723		3.3%
1890	30,660		−6.3%
1900	29,865		−2.6%
1910	29,673		−0.6%
1920	28,161		−5.1%
1930	27,417		−2.6%
1940	29,092		6.1%
1950	31,916		9.7%
1960	34,742		8.9%
1970	37,171		7.0%
1980	42,071		13.2%
1990	43,431		3.2%
2000	46,527		7.1%
2010	46,688		0.3%
2020	45,746		−2.0%
2025 (est.)	45,738	▼	0.0%
US Decennial Census; 1790-1960 1900-1990; 1990-2000 2010-2020

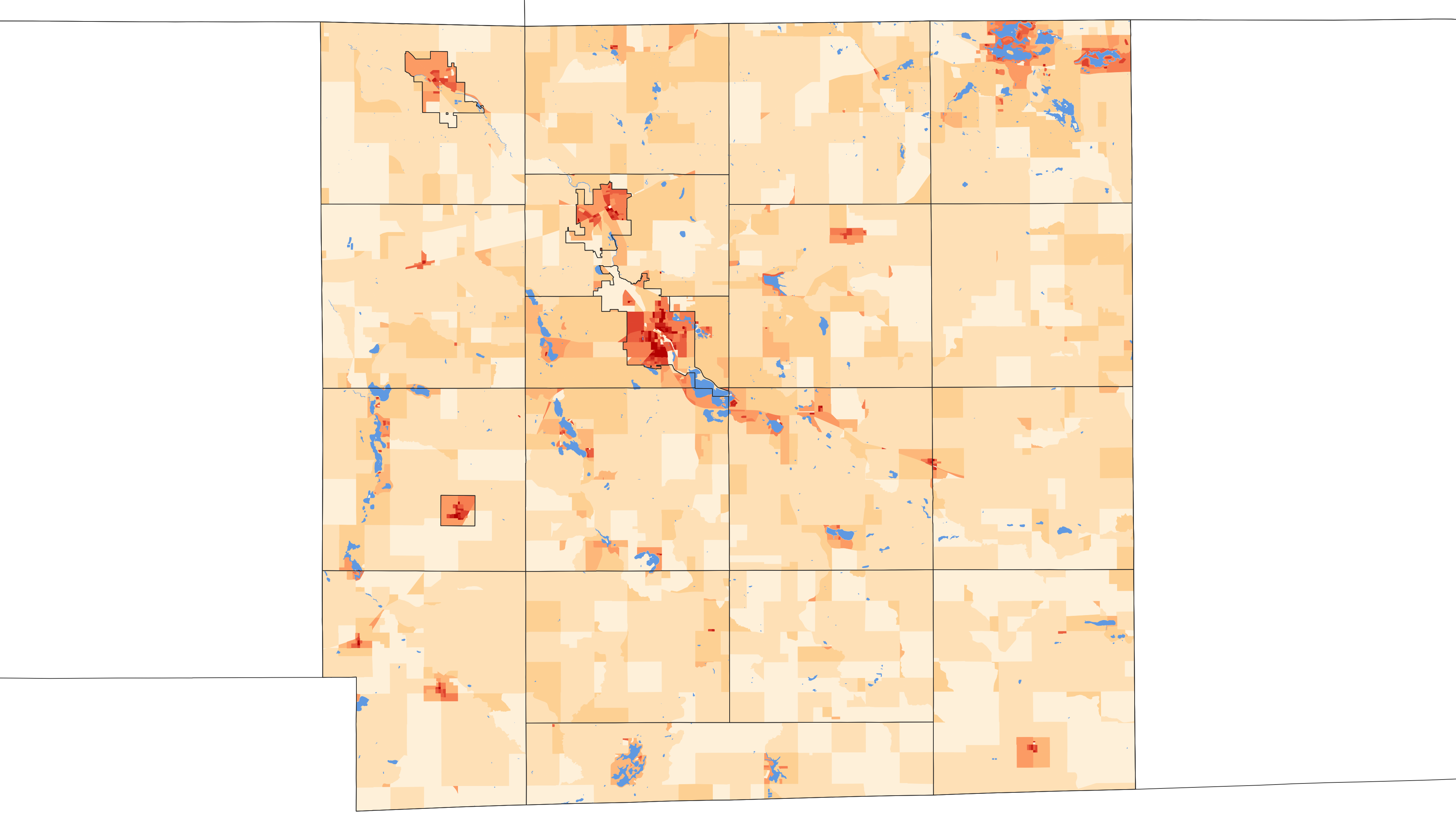
2020 population density of Hillsdale County MI by census block

=== Racial and ethnic composition ===
Hillsdale County, Michigan – Racial and ethnic composition Note: the US Census treats Hispanic/Latino as an ethnic category. This table excludes Latinos from the racial categories and assigns them to a separate category. Hispanics/Latinos may be of any race.
Race / Ethnicity (NH = Non-Hispanic)	Pop 1980	Pop 1990	Pop 2000	Pop 2010	Pop 2020	% 1980	% 1990	% 2000	% 2010	% 2020
White alone (NH)	41,461	42,665	45,042	44,765	42,145	98.55%	98.24%	96.81%	95.88%	92.13%
Black or African American alone (NH)	101	113	197	206	196	0.24%	0.26%	0.42%	0.44%	0.43%
Native American or Alaska Native alone (NH)	77	127	157	162	143	0.18%	0.29%	0.34%	0.35%	0.31%
Asian alone (NH)	93	110	151	185	176	0.22%	0.25%	0.32%	0.40%	0.38%
Native Hawaiian or Pacific Islander alone (NH)	x	x	5	3	6	x	x	0.01%	0.01%	0.01%
Other race alone (NH)	32	21	33	23	137	0.08%	0.05%	0.07%	0.05%	0.30%
Mixed race or Multiracial (NH)	x	x	384	518	1,771	x	x	0.83%	1.11%	3.87%
Hispanic or Latino (any race)	307	395	558	826	1,172	0.73%	0.91%	1.20%	1.77%	2.56%
Total	42,071	43,431	46,527	46,688	45,746	100.00%	100.00%	100.00%	100.00%	100.00%

=== 2020 census ===
As of the 2020 census, the county had a population of 45,746. The median age was 42.3 years. 22.2% of residents were under the age of 18 and 20.5% of residents were 65 years of age or older. For every 100 females there were 99.6 males, and for every 100 females age 18 and over there were 98.5 males age 18 and over.

The racial makeup of the county was 93.2% White, 0.5% Black or African American, 0.4% American Indian and Alaska Native, 0.4% Asian, <0.1% Native Hawaiian and Pacific Islander, 0.7% from some other race, and 4.9% from two or more races. Hispanic or Latino residents of any race comprised 2.6% of the population.

23.3% of residents lived in urban areas, while 76.7% lived in rural areas.

There were 18,062 households in the county, of which 27.4% had children under the age of 18 living in them. Of all households, 50.2% were married-couple households, 19.4% were households with a male householder and no spouse or partner present, and 23.3% were households with a female householder and no spouse or partner present. About 28.5% of all households were made up of individuals and 13.3% had someone living alone who was 65 years of age or older.

There were 21,396 housing units, of which 15.6% were vacant. Among occupied housing units, 77.5% were owner-occupied and 22.5% were renter-occupied. The homeowner vacancy rate was 1.1% and the rental vacancy rate was 6.5%.

=== 2000 census ===
As of the 2000 United States census, there were 46,527 people, 17,335 households, and 12,550 families residing in the county. The population density was 78 people per square mile (30 people/km^{2}). There were 20,189 housing units at an average density of 34 per square mile (13/km^{2}). The racial makeup of the county was 97.56% White, 0.43% Black or African American, 0.35% Native American, 0.33% Asian, 0.01% Pacific Islander, 0.34% from other races, and 0.98% from two or more races. 1.20% of the population were Hispanic or Latino of any race. 28.4% were of German, 28.2% English and 9.3% Irish ancestry, 97.0% spoke English, 1.2% Spanish and 1.2% German as their first language.

There were 17,335 households, out of which 32.90% had children under the age of 18 living with them, 59.90% were married couples living together, 8.40% had a female householder with no husband present, and 27.60% were non-families. 22.90% of all households were made up of individuals, and 9.30% had someone living alone who was 65 years of age or older. The average household size was 2.60 and the average family size was 3.05.

The county's population contained 26.30% under the age of 18, 10.00% from 18 to 24, 26.80% from 25 to 44, 23.50% from 45 to 64, and 13.30% who were 65 years of age or older. The median age was 36 years. For every 100 females there were 99.00 males. For every 100 females age 18 and over, there were 96.20 males.

The median income for a household in the county was $40,396, and the median income for a family was $45,895. Males had a median income of $35,349 versus $23,718 for females. The per capita income for the county was $18,255. About 5.20% of families and 8.20% of the population were below the poverty line, including 8.80% of those under age 18 and 8.60% of those age 65 or over.

== Politics ==
Hillsdale County has been a reliably Republican county since the 19th century. Since 1884, the Republican nominee has carried the county in 34 of 36 presidential elections, the lone exceptions being when it was carried by Democrat Lyndon B. Johnson amidst a national landslide in 1964 (albeit by only 144 votes), and when it was carried by Progressive nominee Theodore Roosevelt when the Republican electorate had a schism in 1912. In 2024, Donald Trump carried the county by one of the highest margins of any candidate since the county was formed.

United States presidential election results for Hillsdale County, Michigan
Year	Republican		Democratic		Third party(ies)	
Year	No.	%	No.	%	No.	%
1884	4,315	52.80%	3,222	39.43%	635	7.77%
1888	4,959	57.00%	3,035	34.89%	706	8.11%
1892	4,119	53.65%	2,613	34.03%	946	12.32%
1896	4,564	52.12%	3,986	45.52%	206	2.35%
1900	4,780	56.93%	3,324	39.59%	293	3.49%
1904	4,951	70.45%	1,659	23.61%	418	5.95%
1908	4,463	60.98%	2,516	34.38%	340	4.65%
1912	1,437	20.68%	2,229	32.08%	3,283	47.24%
1916	3,463	48.69%	3,424	48.14%	226	3.18%
1920	6,690	71.12%	2,467	26.23%	249	2.65%
1924	6,556	68.45%	1,980	20.67%	1,042	10.88%
1928	8,282	80.99%	1,893	18.51%	51	0.50%
1932	5,879	49.54%	5,696	48.00%	292	2.46%
1936	6,723	55.03%	5,023	41.11%	471	3.86%
1940	9,398	72.25%	3,538	27.20%	71	0.55%
1944	9,364	74.33%	3,153	25.03%	81	0.64%
1948	7,232	67.21%	3,095	28.76%	433	4.02%
1952	10,680	75.51%	3,340	23.62%	123	0.87%
1956	10,311	74.68%	3,428	24.83%	67	0.49%
1960	10,208	71.19%	4,069	28.38%	63	0.44%
1964	6,420	49.05%	6,564	50.15%	106	0.81%
1968	8,506	63.27%	3,803	28.29%	1,135	8.44%
1972	9,261	68.64%	3,942	29.22%	289	2.14%
1976	9,307	62.23%	5,427	36.29%	221	1.48%
1980	10,951	66.37%	4,375	26.52%	1,173	7.11%
1984	12,063	76.50%	3,616	22.93%	89	0.56%
1988	10,571	68.29%	4,763	30.77%	145	0.94%
1992	7,579	42.36%	5,244	29.31%	5,068	28.33%
1996	7,947	48.56%	5,955	36.39%	2,464	15.06%
2000	10,483	60.00%	6,495	37.17%	495	2.83%
2004	12,804	63.34%	7,123	35.23%	289	1.43%
2008	11,221	54.87%	8,765	42.86%	463	2.26%
2012	11,727	61.40%	7,106	37.20%	267	1.40%
2016	14,095	70.69%	4,799	24.07%	1,046	5.25%
2020	17,037	73.11%	5,883	25.25%	382	1.64%
2024	18,631	75.04%	5,875	23.66%	322	1.30%

United States Senate election results for Hillsdale County, Michigan1
Year	Republican		Democratic		Third party(ies)	
Year	No.	%	No.	%	No.	%
2024	17,792	72.90%	5,924	24.27%	689	2.82%

Michigan Gubernatorial election results for Hillsdale County
Year	Republican		Democratic		Third party(ies)	
Year	No.	%	No.	%	No.	%
2022	12,644	67.80%	5,575	29.89%	431	2.31%

The county government operates the county jail, maintains rural roads, operates the major local courts, records deeds, mortgages, and vital records, administers public health regulations, and participates with the state in the provision of social services. The county board of commissioners controls the budget and has limited authority to make laws or ordinances. In Michigan, most local government functions — police and fire, building and zoning, tax assessment, street maintenance, etc. — are the responsibility of individual cities and townships.

=== Elected officials ===
- Circuit Court Judge: Honorable Sara S. Lisznyai
- District Court Judge: Honorable Megan Stiverson
- Probate Judge: Honorable Michelle A. Bianchi
- Prosecuting Attorney: Jamie Wisniewski
- Sheriff: Scott B. Hodshire
- County Clerk: Abe Dane
- County Treasurer: Stephenie Kyser
- Register of Deeds: Nick Wheeler
- Drain Commissioner: Matt Word
- Board of Commissioners:
  - District One: Doug Ingles
  - District Two: Kevin Collins
  - District Three: Mark E. Wiley, Chairperson
  - District Four: Brad Benzing, Vice Chair
  - District Five: Brent A. Leininger

=== Republican Party Split ===
On August 12, 2022, the Hillsdale County Republican Party refused to let duly elected precinct delegates enter the County Convention. This was under the claim that Hillsdale County Clerk, Marney Kast, had deliberately spoiled certain candidates' ballots past the filing deadline. They held the convention with those who were not disavowed inside the Sozo Church. The duly elected precinct delegates held their own convention outside in the parking lot. The party split, and multiple lawsuits followed after.

Currently, the Michigan Republican Party recognizes Brent Leininger as the Chair of the Hillsdale County Republican Party, who was one of the precinct delegates previously disavowed.

== Transportation ==
=== Major highways ===
- US 12 crosses the county in a generally east–west direction for a distance of about 23 miles. US 12 is the southernmost US Highway in Michigan to go east and west.
- US 127 is the north–south highway running along a portion of the eastern boundary of the county and is also called Meridian Road as it runs along the Michigan meridian.
- M-34 is a highway from the eastern border of the county westward until it joins M-99. It is also known as Hudson Road.
- M-49 is a north–south highway running north from the Ohio border and intersects M-99 in the northwest corner of the county.
- M-99 crosses the county in a generally north–south direction for a distance of about 30 miles. It is also known as Carleton Road (named after the poet Will Carleton who attended Hillsdale College and lived in Hillsdale for a time.)

=== Airports ===
Hillsdale Municipal Airport (KJYM) established in 1963, has a 5000' paved and lighted runway with instrument approaches, hangars, tie-downs, and fuel services available. It allows general aviation access to Hillsdale County and nearby areas.

=== Trails ===
The 4000 mile National Scenic North Country Trail passes through the county in a north–south direction.

== Communities ==
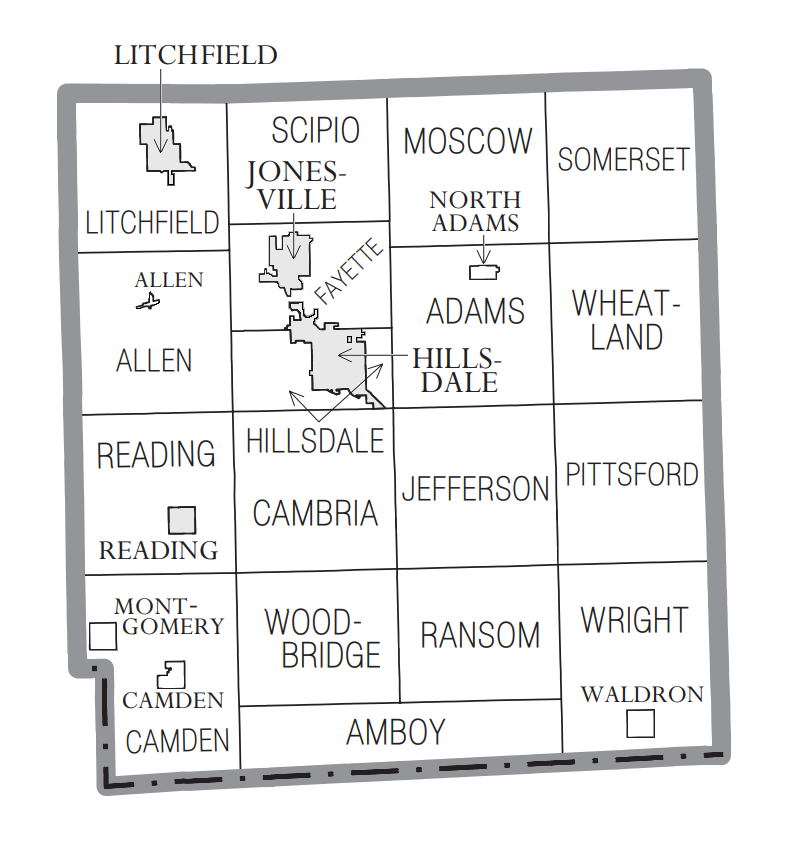
U.S. Census data map showing local municipal boundaries within Hillsdale County. Shaded areas represent incorporated cities.

=== Cities ===
- Hillsdale (county seat)
- Jonesville
- Litchfield
- Reading

=== Villages ===
- Allen
- Camden
- Montgomery
- North Adams
- Waldron

=== Civil townships ===
- Adams Township
- Allen Township
- Amboy Township
- Cambria Township
- Camden Township
- Fayette Township
- Hillsdale Township
- Jefferson Township
- Litchfield Township
- Moscow Township
- Pittsford Township
- Ransom Township
- Reading Township
- Scipio Township
- Somerset Township
- Wheatland Township
- Woodbridge Township
- Wright Township

=== Census-designated places ===
- Cambria
- Lake LeAnn
- Pittsford

=== Unincorporated communities ===
- Amboy Center
- Austin
- Bankers
- Betzer
- Church's Corners
- Frontier
- Jerome
- Locust Corners
- Moscow
- Mosherville
- Osseo
- Prattville
- Ransom
- Somerset
- Somerset Center

== Notable people ==
- Moses Allen, first settler and veteran of the War of 1812.
- Oscar F. Avery (1841–1924), lawyer and Illinois state senator, was born in Allen Township.
- Don A. Jones (1912–2000), admiral and civil engineer, seventh Director of the United States Coast and Geodetic Survey and second Director of the Environmental Science Services Administration Corps, born in Waldron.
- Penny Neer, Olympic athlete.

== See also ==
- Bawbeese
- National Register of Historic Places listings in Hillsdale County, Michigan
- List of Michigan State Historic Sites in Hillsdale County
