= Lake LeAnn, Michigan =

- Census-designated place (CDP) & unincorporated community
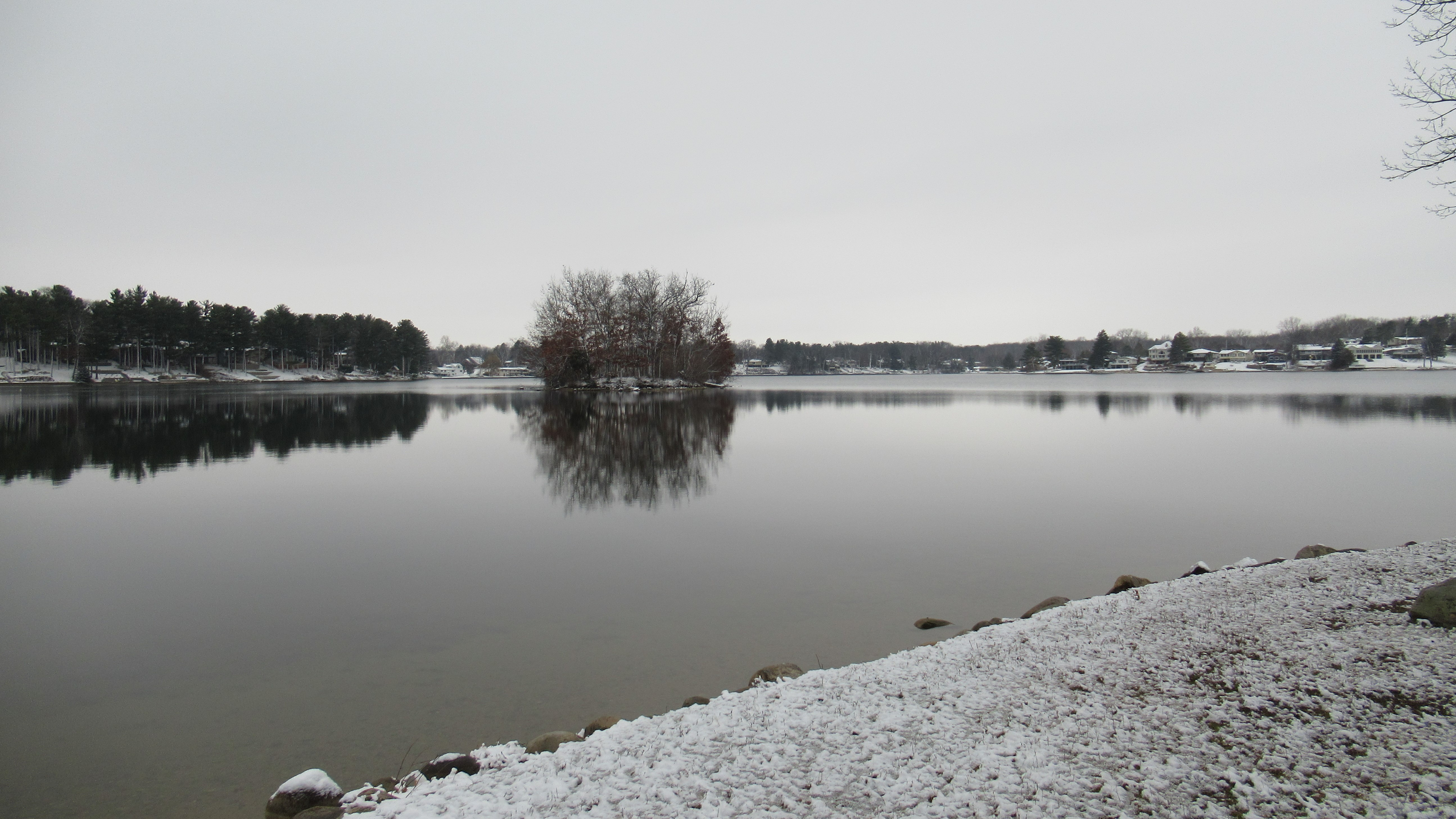
- View of the northern section of Lake LeAnn

- Location within the state of Michigan Location within the United States
- Coordinates: 42°03′45″N 84°25′49″W
- Country: United States
- State: Michigan
- County: Hillsdale
- Township: Somerset

Area
  - Total: 2.40 sq mi (6.22 km^{2})
  - Land: 1.66 sq mi (4.29 km^{2})
  - Water: 0.75 sq mi (1.93 km^{2})
- Elevation: 1,055 ft (322 m)

Population (2020)
  - Total: 1,571
  - Density: 948.5/sq mi (366.23/km^{2})
- Time zone: UTC-5 (Eastern (EST))
  - Summer (DST): UTC-4 (EDT)
- ZIP code(s): 49249 (Jerome)
- Area code: 517
- FIPS code: 26-44752
- GNIS feature ID: 2806330

Lake LeAnn is an unincorporated community and census-designated place (CDP) in Hillsdale County in the U.S. state of Michigan. The CDP has a population of 1,571 at the 2020 census. It is located in Somerset Township and includes the namesake Lake LeAnn and several other lakes that are part of the Grand River headwaters.

U.S. Route 12 runs through the southern part of the community, leading east-northeast 47 miles (76 km) to Ypsilanti and west-southwest 32 miles (51 km) to Coldwater.

== Demographics ==
Historical population
Census	Pop.	Note	%±
2020	1,571		—
U.S. Decennial Census

=== 2020 census ===
As of the 2020 census, Lake LeAnn had a population of 1,571. The median age was 52.6 years. 17.7% of residents were under the age of 18 and 27.1% of residents were 65 years of age or older. For every 100 females there were 92.8 males, and for every 100 females age 18 and over there were 100.8 males age 18 and over.

0.0% of residents lived in urban areas, while 100.0% lived in rural areas.

There were 711 households in Lake LeAnn, of which 20.5% had children under the age of 18 living in them. Of all households, 57.4% were married-couple households, 16.7% were households with a male householder and no spouse or partner present, and 21.1% were households with a female householder and no spouse or partner present. About 27.7% of all households were made up of individuals and 12.6% had someone living alone who was 65 years of age or older.

There were 1,024 housing units, of which 30.6% were vacant. The homeowner vacancy rate was 0.8% and the rental vacancy rate was 12.7%.

Racial composition as of the 2020 census
Race	Number	Percent
White	1,466	93.3%
Black or African American	9	0.6%
American Indian and Alaska Native	2	0.1%
Asian	8	0.5%
Native Hawaiian and Other Pacific Islander	0	0.0%
Some other race	9	0.6%
Two or more races	77	4.9%
Hispanic or Latino (of any race)	50	3.2%
