= Wheatland Township, Hillsdale County, Michigan =

Wheatland Township, Michigan
- Civil township
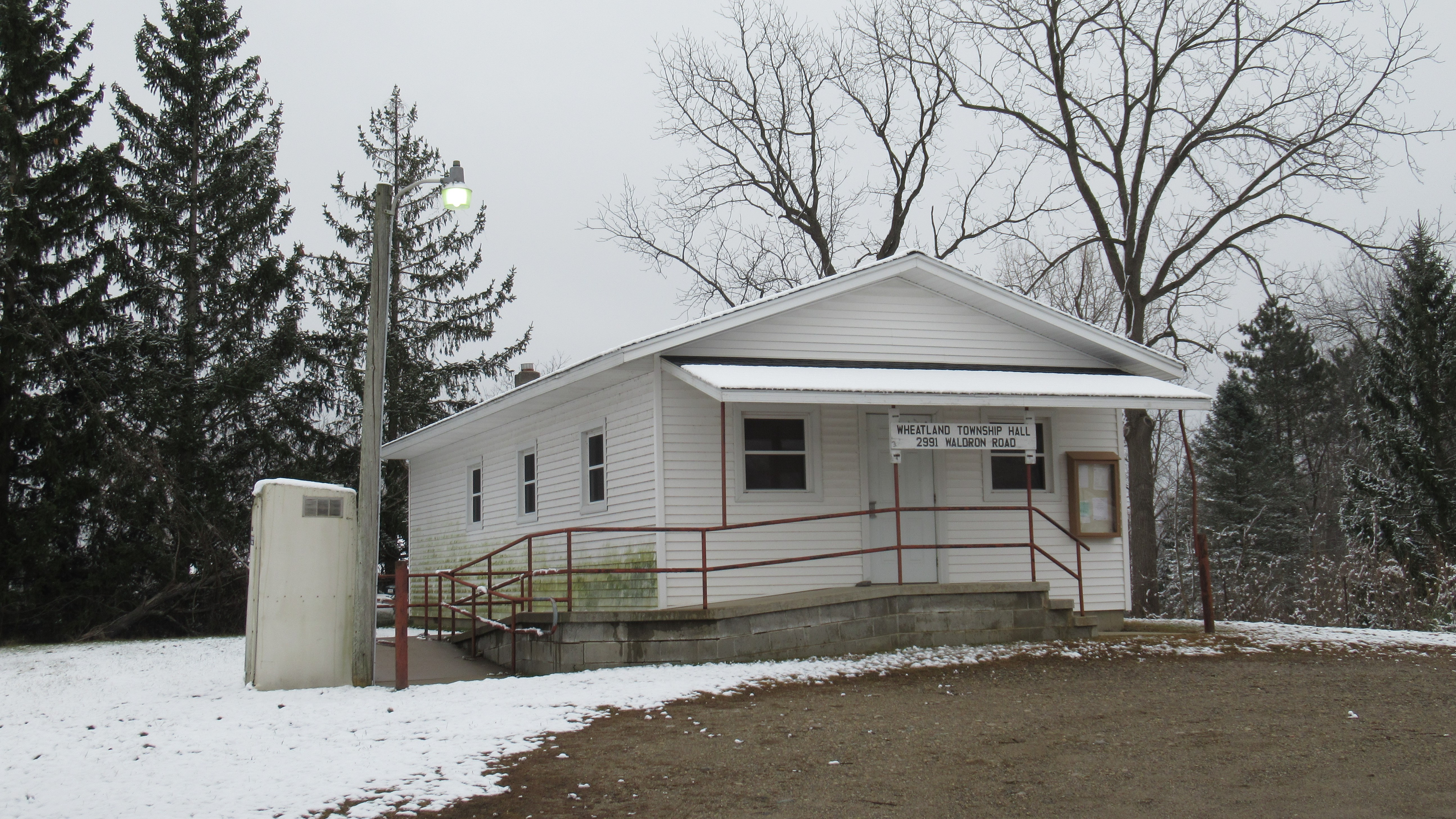
- Wheatland Township Hall

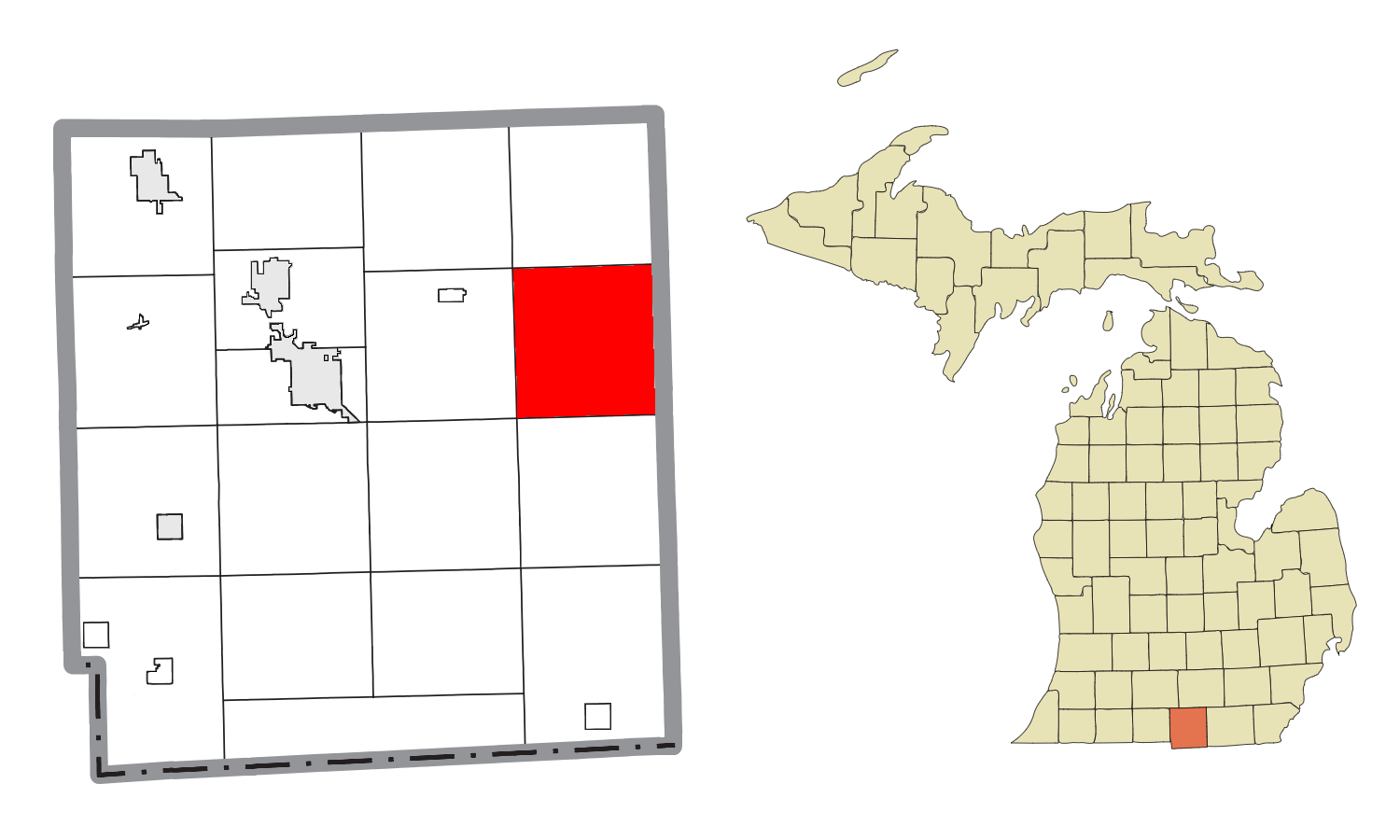
- Location within Hillsdale County

- Location within the state of Michigan Location within the United States
- Coordinates: 41°56′28″N 84°24′17″W
- Country: United States
- State: Michigan
- County: Hillsdale
- Established: 1835

Government
  - Supervisor: Dave Stone
  - Clerk: Dawn Johnson

Area
  - Total: 35.68 sq mi (92.41 km^{2})
  - Land: 35.65 sq mi (92.33 km^{2})
  - Water: 0.031 sq mi (0.08 km^{2})
- Elevation: 1,089 ft (332 m)

Population (2020)
  - Total: 1,224
  - Density: 34.3/sq mi (13.2/km^{2})
- Time zone: UTC-5 (Eastern (EST))
  - Summer (DST): UTC-4 (EDT)
- ZIP code(s): 49220 (Addison); 49242 (Hillsdale); 49247 (Hudson); 49249 (Jerome); 49262 (North Adams); 49266 (Osseo); 49271 (Pittsford)
- Area code: 517
- FIPS code: 26-86540
- GNIS feature ID: 1627255

Wheatland Township is a civil township of Hillsdale County in the U.S. state of Michigan. The population was 1,224 at the 2020 census.

== Communities ==
- Church is a former settlement within the township. It was founded by township clerk Francis G. Church, who served as the first postmaster when a post office began operating here on June 27, 1870. Originally named Church's Corner, the post office was renamed Church on May 28, 1894, and was eventually disestablished on June 15, 1901.
- Wheatland is an unincorporated community located within the township at 41°58′16″N 84°24′04″W. It was first settled in 1834 by Edmund Brown. A post office began operating here on September 9, 1835, with Thomas Gamble serving as the first postmaster. Gamble renamed the post office Gambleville on October 17, 1837. When Somerset Township was organized from the northern half of Wheatland Township in 1837, the post office became part of that township. In 1841, Gamble renamed that post office Somerset, and a new post office named Wheatland Centre began operating in Wheatland Township. This post office was renamed Wheatland on February 3, 1882, until it was disestablished on March 31, 1903.

== Geography ==
According to the U.S. Census Bureau, the township has a total area of 35.68 square miles (92.41 km^{2}), of which 35.65 square miles (92.33 km^{2}) is land and 0.03 square miles (0.08 km^{2}) (0.08%) is water.

=== Historic sites ===
- William Treadwell House is a historic house built in 1860. It is a Michigan State Historic Site and is also listed on the National Register of Historic Places.

=== Major highways ===
- US 127 (Meridian Road) runs south–north near the eastern border of the township.

== Demographics ==
As of the census of 2000, there were 1,258 people, 457 households, and 361 families residing in the township. The population density was 35.3 inhabitants per square mile (13.6/km^{2}). There were 497 housing units at an average density of 13.9 per square mile (5.4/km^{2}). The racial makeup of the township was 97.93% White, 0.56% Native American, 0.16% Asian, and 1.35% from two or more races. Hispanic or Latino of any race were 0.79% of the population.

There were 457 households, out of which 35.4% had children under the age of 18 living with them, 67.8% were married couples living together, 6.8% had a female householder with no husband present, and 20.8% were non-families. 18.6% of all households were made up of individuals, and 6.6% had someone living alone who was 65 years of age or older. The average household size was 2.75 and the average family size was 3.11.

In the township the population was spread out, with 28.1% under the age of 18, 5.9% from 18 to 24, 28.5% from 25 to 44, 24.4% from 45 to 64, and 13.2% who were 65 years of age or older. The median age was 38 years. For every 100 females, there were 103.6 males. For every 100 females age 18 and over, there were 108.5 males.

The median income for a household in the township was $40,000, and the median income for a family was $46,875. Males had a median income of $39,271 versus $22,188 for females. The per capita income for the township was $18,026. About 3.6% of families and 6.3% of the population were below the poverty line, including 10.8% of those under age 18 and 5.4% of those age 65 or over.

== Education ==
The township is served by four separate public school districts. The southwestern portion of the township is served by Pittsford Area Schools, while the northwestern portion is served by North Adams-Jerome Schools. The northeast portion of the township is served by Addison Community Schools, while the southeastern portion is served by Hudson Area Schools—both to the east in Lenawee County.

== Notable people ==
- Robert Cox, state representative
