= McCourtie Park =

Recreational park in Michigan, United States

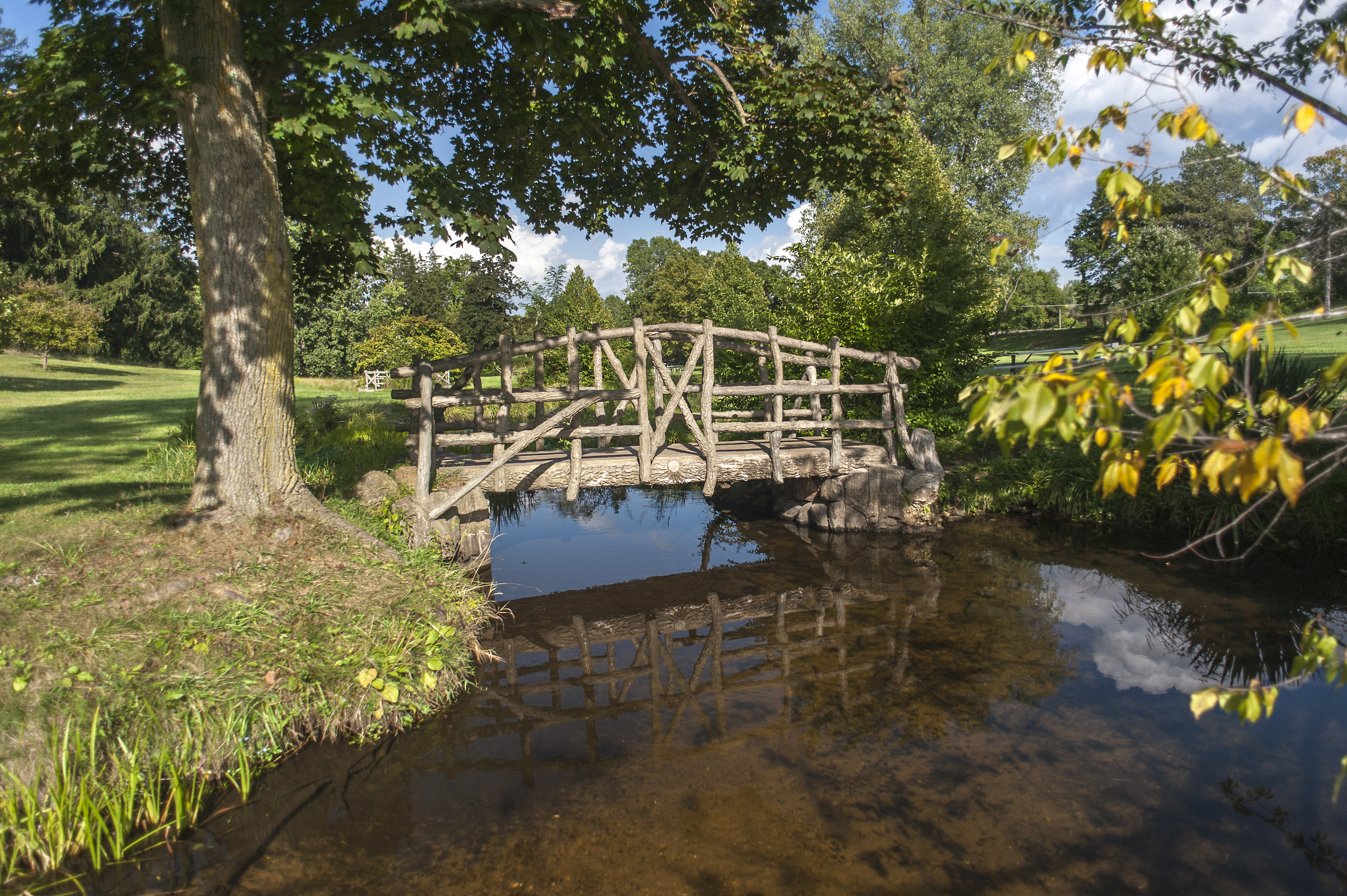
- Footbridge at McCourtie Park
- Interactive map of McCourtie Park
- Location: 10426 South Jackson Road at US 12, Somerset Center, Michigan, United States
- Coordinates: 42°3′8″N 84°24′30″W
- Created: 1987
- W. H. L. McCourtie Estate
- U.S. National Register of Historic Places
- Michigan State Historic Site
- Area: 42 acres (17 ha)
- Architect: George Cardoso, Ralph Corona
- Architectural style: Folk art, rustic, faux bois
- NRHP reference No.: 91001984

Significant dates
- Added to NRHP: January 24, 1992
- Designated MSHS: January 17, 1991

McCourtie Park, originally dalled Aiden Lair, is a recreational park located at 10426 South Jackson Road (at US 12) in Somerset Center, Michigan. It was designated a Michigan State Historic Site in 1991 and listed on the National Register of Historic Places in 1992 under the name W. H. L. McCourtie Estate. The site may contain the country's largest collection of el trabejo rustico (known in French as faux bois), the Mexican folk art tradition where wet concrete is sculpted to look like wood.

== History ==
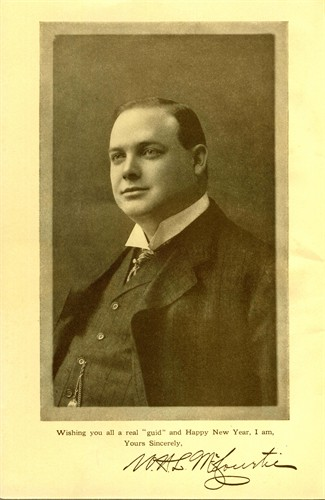
William Herbert Lee McCourtie, c. 1914

William Herbert Lee McCourtie was born in 1872 on a farm near Somerset Center, the eighth child of Mary Cohan McCourtie and Michael Doty McCourtie. He went to the University of Michigan and graduated with a law degree in 1891, and married Ellen D. Hulett in 1896. In 1897, he was introduced to the cement industry by W. F. Cowham of Jackson. He soon moved to Dallas, Texas, where he made a fortune in the oil business, and founded his own cement company, Trinity Portland Cement. In the 1920s, McCourtie returned to Somerset Center and in 1924 he purchased the family home and surrounding property and turned it into "Aiden Lair," a community center where he hosted multiple events. He continued hosting free community events well into the Great Depression. McCourtie also hosted out-of-town luminaries; it is known that Henry Ford was a visitor to Aiden Lair.

Around 1930, McCourtie hired two itinerant Mexican artisans, George Cardoso and Ralph Corona, to build 17 concrete bridges at Aiden Lair, spanning the winding stream that flowed through the property. Cardoso and Corona used a technique known as el trabejo rustico (known in French as faux bois), a Mexican folk art tradition where wet concrete is sculpted to look like wood. The two had learned the craft from Dionicio Rodriguez, the most famous artisan in, and acknowledged master of, the genre. It is known that a third unidentified artisan assisted Cardoso and Corona; it has been speculated that the unknown third person was Rodriguez. The cement structures on the property were completed between 1930 and 1933.

W. H. L. McCourtie died in 1933. After his death, the estate passed through multiple hands. In 1987, the estate was made into a public park. The house on the property was demolished, but the cement sculptures and an underground garage and rathskeller still remain.

The McCourtie Estate is now a public park known as McCourtie Park, and in addition to the concrete sculptures contains a tennis court, basketball court, a fenced ball diamond, an 18 hole disc golf course, and a picnic area. Admission is free.

== Description ==
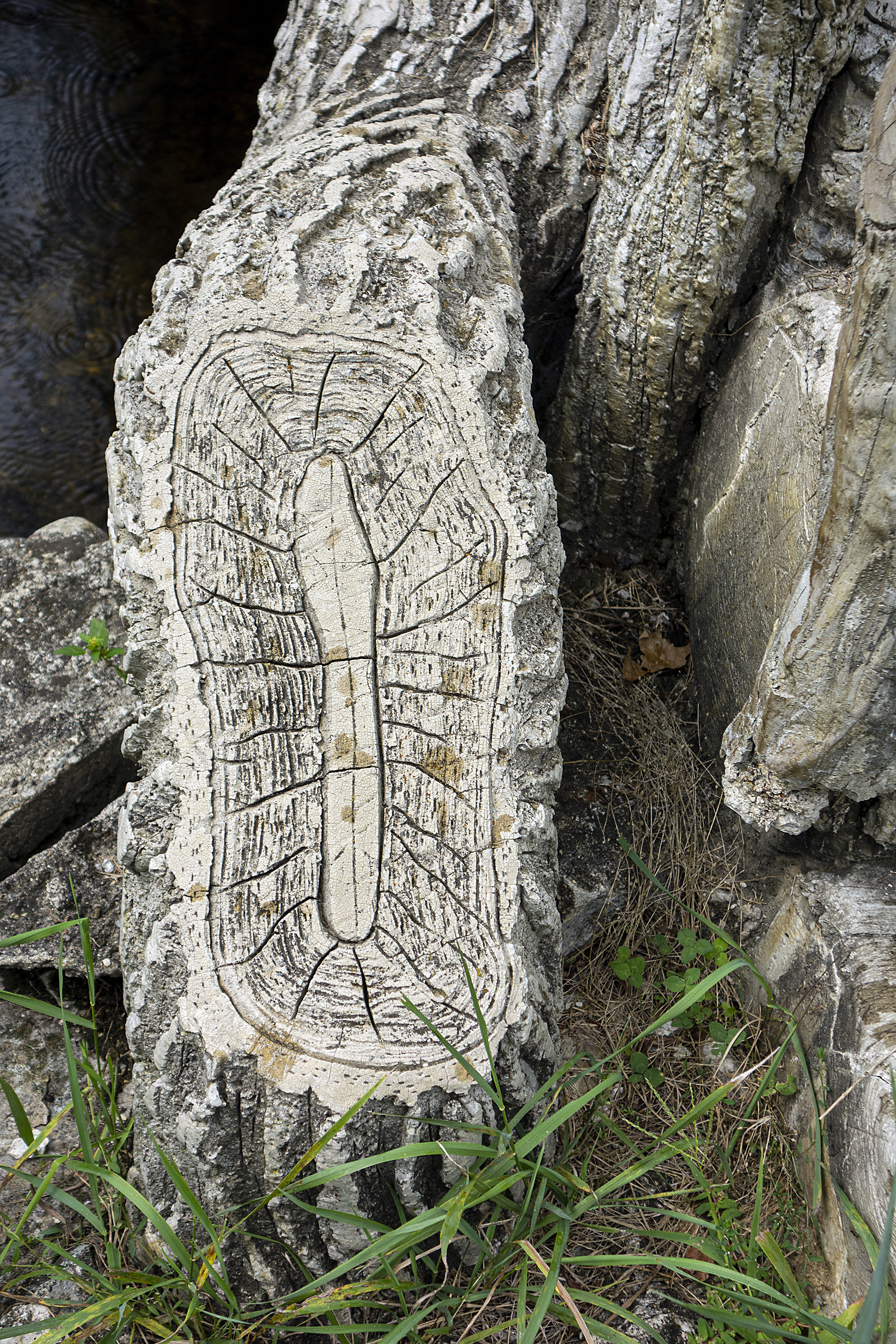
Detail of a bridge at McCourtie Park

The McCourtie Estate covers 42 acres (17 ha) and contains seventeen folk art cement bridges as well as two life-size cement trees that serve as chimneys for the underground garage and rathskeller. The structures are made using a technique known as el trabejo rustico, a Mexican folk art tradition where wet concrete is sculpted to look like wood. The artisans used steel rods as the base, then covered them with wet concrete and hand-sculpted the surface to resemble natural materials such as planed lumber, rough logs, thatch and rope. Two concrete pools and two large bird houses (one with 192 chambers and the other with 288) are also located on the property.

Each of the seventeen bridges is unique, with one resembling a thatched cottage, and another resembling a swinging rope bridge. The sculptural elements are extremely detailed, showing "hewing" marks, wood grain, and individual fibers in the thatch and rope. Different tree species can be identified by the bark.
