= List of Michigan State Historic Sites in Hillsdale County =

Location of Hillsdale County in Michigan

The following is a list of Michigan State Historic Sites in Hillsdale County, Michigan. Sites marked with a dagger (†) are also listed on the National Register of Historic Places in Hillsdale County, Michigan.

== Current listings ==
Name	Image	Location	City	Listing date
18th Michigan Infantry Regiment, 1862		Lewis Emery Park; 2020 State Road	Hillsdale Township	July 10, 1963
Baw Beese Lake / Sandy Beach Informational Designation		1533 Lakeview Drive	Allen	2017
Camp Woodbury / Lewis Emery Park Informational Designation		12020 State Road	Hillsdale Township	2017
Captain Moses Allen Commemorative Designation		Allen Area Historical Society; 151 West Chicago Road	Allen	September 23, 1993
College Baptist Church		204 North Manning Street	Hillsdale	November 26, 1985
J.J. Deal and Son Carriage Factory† / Kiddie Brush and Toy Company		117 West Street	Jonesville	2016
Delevan House (Munro House)		202 Maumee Street	Jonesville	April 14, 1972
First Methodist Episcopal Church		45 North Manning Street	Hillsdale	June 23, 1983
Grace Episcopal Church†		360 East Chicago Street	Jonesville	January 6, 1971
Grange Hall		Hillsdale County Fairgrounds; 115 South Broad Street	Hillsdale	September 11, 1979
E.O. Grosvenor House†		211 Maumee Street	Jonesville	April 15, 1977
Hallett–Stevens House		101 West Hallett Street	Hillsdale	February 18, 1982
Hillsdale City Hall		97 Broad Street	Hillsdale	October 23, 1987
Hillsdale College Informational Designation		33 East College Street	Hillsdale	January 16, 1962
Hillsdale County Courthouse†		29 North Howell Street	Hillsdale	April 10, 1969
William R. Kirby Sr. House†		3771 State Road	Adams Township	June 15, 1979
Litchfield Congregational Church		203 North Chicago Street	Litchfield	June 10, 1980
Litchfield Township School District No. 6 School		153 Mill Street	Litchfield	February 15, 1990
McCourtie Mausoleum		Somerset Center Cemetery; Southwest corner of US 12 and Waldron Road	Somerset Township	March 21, 1991
W. H. L. McCourtie / W. H. L. McCourtie Estate†		10426 South Jackson Road	Somerset Township	January 17, 1991
Michigan and Ohio Railroad Moscow Depot		7324 East Chicago Road	Moscow Township	May 8, 1986
Mosherville Church and School Complex		1520 North Street	Scipio Township	April 24, 1979
St. Anthony's Catholic Church		11 North Broad Street	Hillsdale	April 20, 1989
Saint Peter's Church		3 Broad Street	Hillsdale	October 17, 1996
Frederick W. Stock House		3 South Broad Street	Hillsdale	April 18, 1983
William Treadwell House†		446 North Meridian Road	Wheatland Township	February 22, 1974
Isaac Van Denburg / Hillsdale County Poorhouse		180 Wolcott Street	Hillsdale	June 15, 1989
Wayside Memorial Park		9220 Homer Road	Litchfield Township	2016
James W. Windsor Store		27 North Broad Street	Hillsdale	November 30, 1983

== See also ==
- National Register of Historic Places listings in Hillsdale County, Michigan

== Sources ==
- Historic Sites Online – Hillsdale County. Michigan State Housing Developmental Authority. Accessed January 23, 2011.
