= Hillsdale High School (Michigan) =

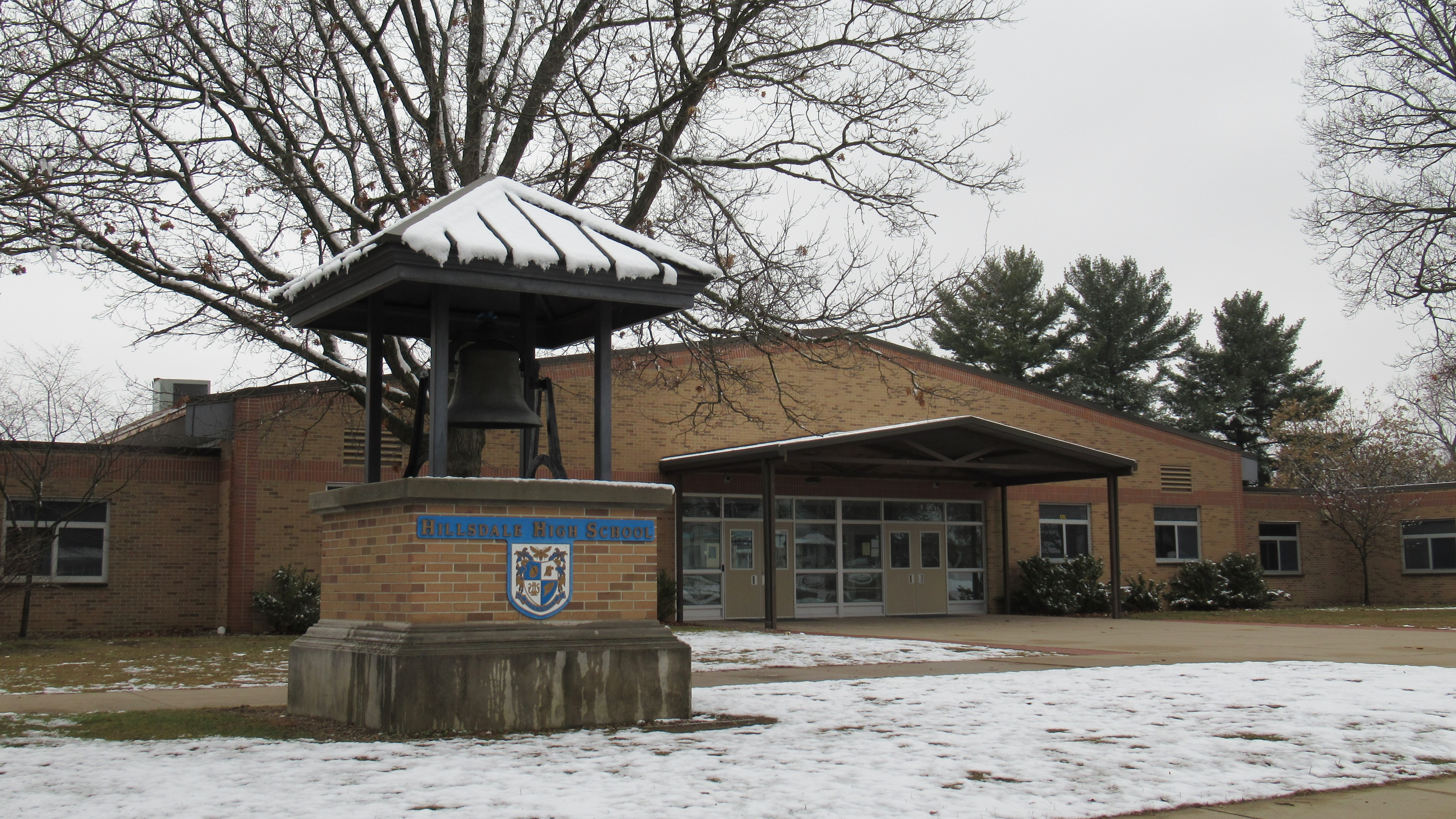

Location
- 30 S Norwood Ave. Hillsdale, Michigan 49242; United States
- Coordinates: 41.9185°N 84.6387°W

Information
- Type: Public, Coeducational high school
- Staff: 21.42 (FTE)
- Grades: 9-12
- Student to teacher ratio: 17.97
- Colors: Maize & Blue
- Athletics conference: Lenawee County Athletic Association
- Mascot: Hornet
- Nickname: Hornets
- Rival: Jonesville Comets
- Website: www.hillsdaleschools.org

Hillsdale High School is a public high school in Hillsdale, Michigan. It is the only high school in the Hillsdale Community School district. Their nickname is the Hornets. They are members of the Lenawee County Athletic Association.

The boundary of the school district, and therefore that of Hillsdale High, includes Hillsdale, most of Hillsdale Township, and portions of these townships: Allen, Adams, Cambria, Fayette, Jefferson, and Woodbridge.
