= Hillsdale =

Hillsdale may refer to:

== Places ==
In Australia:

- Hillsdale, New South Wales, a suburb of Sydney

In Canada:

- Hillsdale, Ontario, a village about 90 minutes north of Toronto
- Rural Municipality of Hillsdale No. 440, a rural municipality in Saskatchewan

In the United States:

- Hillsdale, Illinois
- Hillsdale, Indiana, a village in Vermillion County
- Hillsdale, Michigan
- Hillsdale Township, Michigan
- Hillsdale, Missouri
- Hillsdale, New Jersey in Bergen County
- Hillsdale, Monmouth County, New Jersey
- Hillsdale, New York
- Hillsdale, North Carolina
- Hillsdale, Oklahoma
- Hillsdale, Portland, Oregon, a neighborhood
- Hillsdale, Pennsylvania
- Hillsdale, Tennessee
- Hillsdale, Utah
- Hillsdale, West Virginia
- Hillsdale, Wisconsin
- Hillsdale, Wyoming

== Rail stations ==
- Hillsdale (NJT station), a railroad station in the New Jersey borough, along the Pascack Valley Line
- Hillsdale (Caltrain station), a railroad station in San Mateo, California
- Hillsdale (NYCRR station), a former railroad station in the New York town of the same name

== Other topics ==
- Hillsdale (horse), an American Thoroughbred racehorse
- Hillsdale College in Hillsdale, Michigan
- Hillsdale Academy, operated by Hillsdale College
- Hillsdale Free Will Baptist College, Moore, Oklahoma
- Hillsdale High School (disambiguation), several
- Hillsdale Lake, Kansas
- Hillsdale Shopping Center, California
- Seven Hills School (Cincinnati, Ohio), which includes the Hillsdale campus
