= Moses Allen =

Moses Allen may refer to:

- Moses Allen (minister) (1748–1779), minister of Midway, Georgia during the American Revolution
- Moses Allen (musician) (1907–1983), American jazz bassist
- Moses Allen (settler), first settler in Hillsdale County, Michigan
