= Hillsdale Community Schools =

School district in Michigan, United States

Address
- 30 South Norwood Avenue Hillsdale, Hillsdale County, Michigan, 49242; United States

District information
- Motto: Big school curriculum ~ Small school atmosphere
- Grades: PreKindergarten–12
- Superintendent: Ted Davis
- Schools: 5
- Budget: $19,954,000 2022–2023 expenditures
- NCES District ID: 2618390

Students and staff
- Students: 1,263 (2024–2025)
- Teachers: 81.55 (on an FTE basis) (2024–2025)
- Staff: 188.4 FTE (2024–2025)
- Student–teacher ratio: 15.49 (2024–2025)
- District mascot: Hornets

Other information
- Website: www.hillsdaleschools.org

Hillsdale Community Schools is a public school district in Hillsdale County, Michigan. It serves Hillsdale and parts of the townships of Adams, Allen, Cambria, Fayette, Hillsdale, Jefferson, and Woodbridge.

== History ==
The first teacher in Hillsdale was hired in 1838. In 1841, a tax-supported school was built. Caroline Ford, the teacher, continued her profession here. As Hillsdale grew, a larger stone school was built in 1847.

By 1862, four ward schools had been built in different parts of town in addition to the Stone School on Courthouse Square. On the site of the current Bailey Early Childhood Center, Central School was built in 1867 as the district's secondary school. It also served the primary grades in the central part of town. Bailey Early Childhood Center was built in 1937 as the elementary school in the Third Ward.

A dedicated high school was built in 1905. Adjoining it, a larger junior/senior high school section was built. Designed by Warren Holmes of Lansing, it opened in fall 1930 and is currently known as Davis Middle School.

Gier Elementary was built in 1954. The current high school dates to 1960.

== Schools ==
Schools in Hillsdale Community Schools district
School	Address	Notes
Hillsdale High School	30 S. Norwood, Hillsdale	Grades 9–12; built 1960
Davis Middle School	30 N. West Street, Hillsdale	Grades 5-8; built 1930
Gier Elementary	175 Spring Street, Hillsdale	Grades K-4; built 1954
Bailey Early Childhood Center	59 S. Manning Street, Hillsdale	Grades PreK-K; built 1937
Horizon Alternative School	30 S. Norwood, Hillsdale	Alternative high school
