= Grosvenor House (disambiguation) =

Grosvenor House may refer to:

- Grosvenor House, a former building in Park Lane, London, UK
- Grosvenor House Hotel, a hotel in Mayfair, London, UK
- Grosvenor House (Dubai), a hotel in Dubai, UAE
- E.O. Grosvenor House, a house museum in Jonesville, Michigan, USA
- Grosvenor House, a de Havilland DH.88 Comet aircraft which won the MacRobertson Air Race from the UK to Australia in 1934; the aircraft's owner was the manager of the Grosvenor House Hotel
