= Jonesville Community Schools =

School district in Michigan, United States

Address
- 115 East Street Jonesville, Hillsdale County, Michigan, 49250; United States

District information
- Motto: Empowering Students Today for a Successful Tomorrow
- Grades: Kindergarten-12
- Superintendent: Brandon Wheeler
- Schools: 4
- Budget: $18,738,000 2022-2023 expenditures
- NCES District ID: 2619920

Students and staff
- Students: 1,180 (2024-2025)
- Teachers: 73.0 (on an FTE basis) (2024-2025)
- Staff: 152.62 FTE (2024-2025)
- Student–teacher ratio: 16.16 (2024-2025)

Other information
- Website: www.jonesvilleschools.org

Jonesville Community Schools is a public school district in Hillsdale County, Michigan. It serves Jonesville and parts of the townships of Adams, Allen, Fayette, Hillsdale, Litchfield, Moscow, and Scipio. It also serves a small part of Pulaski Township in Jackson County.

== History ==
Jonesville's first school opened in 1832 in a tavern owned by the founder of the town. The first dedicated school, a log building, was built the next year.

The 1860s saw the construction of a new school. Most of it was rebuilt in 1925 after a 1923 fire, but some of the 1860s structure was retained and integrated into the new construction. The north building, a small annex, was added in the early 1950s, and a gymnasium addition was built in the late 1950s. The building continues to be used as Jonesville Middle School.

A bond issue passed in 1999 by two votes. The bond funded construction of the current high school, completed in March 2003, and renovation of Williams Elementary. The former middle/high school at 401 East Chicago became a dedicated middle school building.

== Schools ==
Schools in Jonesville Community Schools district
School	Address	Notes
Jonesville High School	460 Adrian St., Jonesville	Grades 9-12. Built 2003.
Jonesville Middle School	401 E. Chicago Rd., Jonesville	Grades 6-8
Williams Elementary	440 Adrian St., Jonesville	Grades PreK-5
Pathways School	401 E. Chicago Rd., Jonesville	Alternative school
