= Cambria, Michigan =

- Census-designated place (CDP) & unincorporated community
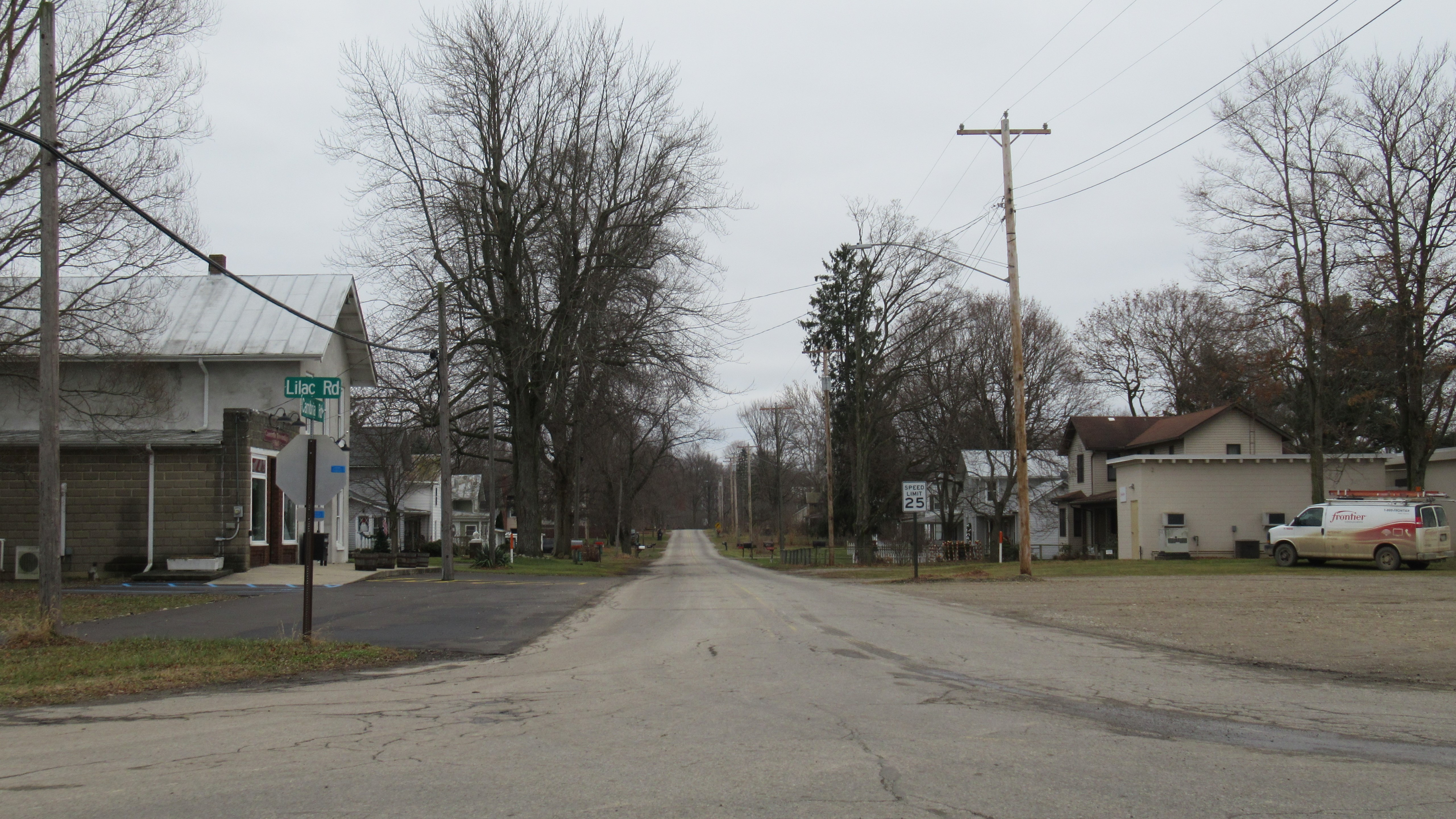
- Looking south along Cambria Road

- Location within the state of Michigan Location within the United States
- Coordinates: 41°49′19″N 84°39′54″W
- Country: United States
- State: Michigan
- County: Hillsdale
- Township: Cambria
- Settled: 1835
- Platted: 1878

Area
  - Total: 1.26 sq mi (3.26 km^{2})
  - Land: 1.24 sq mi (3.21 km^{2})
  - Water: 0.031 sq mi (0.08 km^{2})
- Elevation: 1,070 ft (330 m)

Population (2020)
  - Total: 258
  - Density: 208.7/sq mi (80.57/km^{2})
- Time zone: UTC-5 (Eastern (EST))
  - Summer (DST): UTC-4 (EDT)
- ZIP code(s): 49242 (Hillsdale)
- Area code: 517
- FIPS code: 26-12680
- GNIS feature ID: 622501

Cambria is an unincorporated community and census-designated place (CDP) in Hillsdale County in the U.S. state of Michigan. The population of the CDP was 258 at the 2020 census. The community is located within Cambria Township.

== History ==
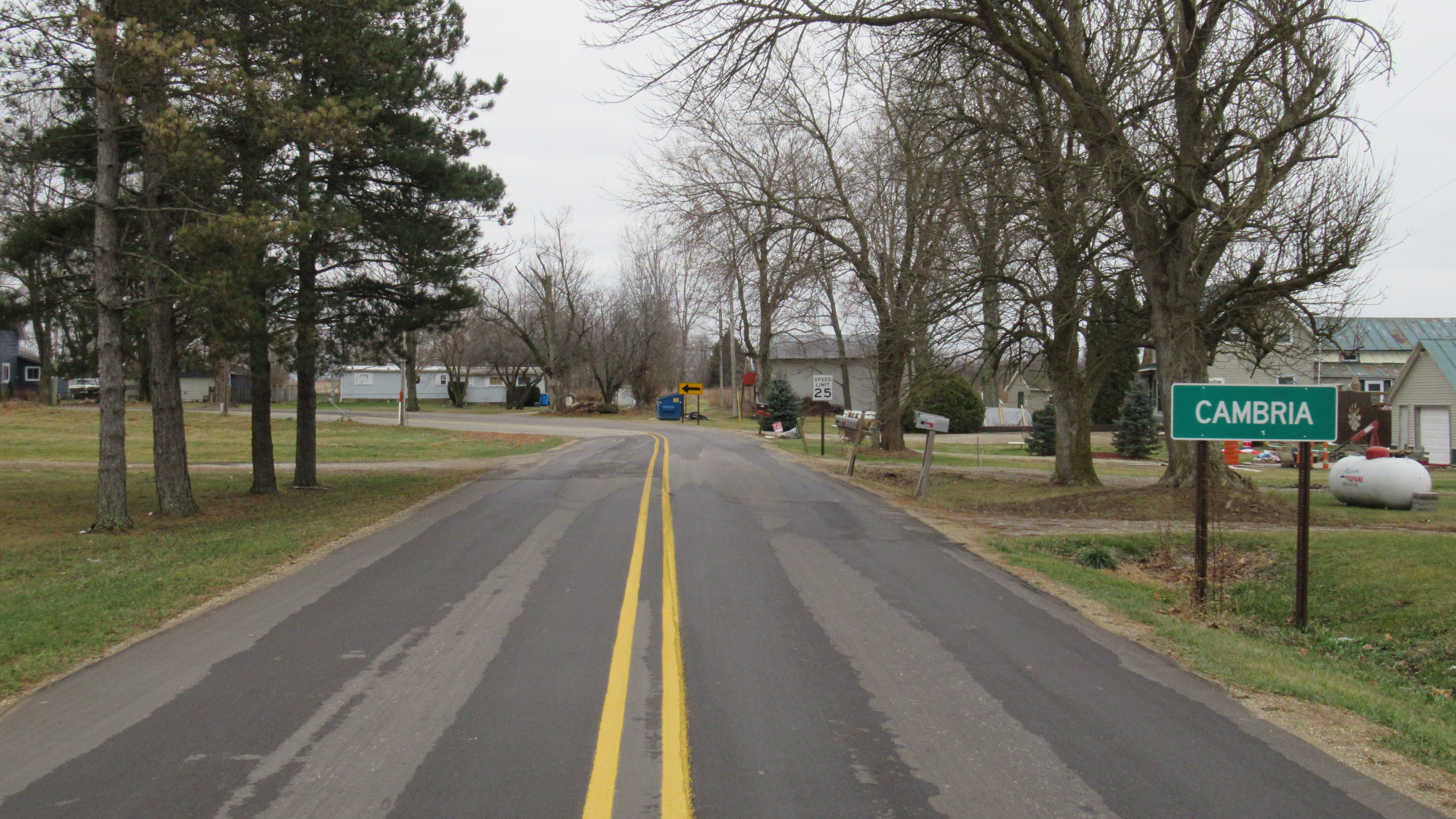
Road signage along Lilac Road

The area was first settled as early as 1835 when John and Andrew McDermid built a sawmill. Other settlers arrived by 1837, and a post office opened on December 14, 1840. The post office was named Woodbridge after Michigan governor William Woodbridge. By the next year, the community and township was named Cambria after Cambria, New York, which was the hometown of many of the early settlers. The post office was also renamed Cambria on June 1, 1841, and operated until August 22, 1853. The community was platted in 1878. The nearby Cambria Mills post office opened on April 17, 1848. This post office was later renamed and transferred to Cambria on November 28, 1882, but later closed completely on September 17, 1906.

For the 2020 census, Cambria was included as a newly listed census-designated place, which is included for statistical purposes only. Cambria continues to remain an unincorporated community with no legal autonomy of its own.

== Geography ==
According to the U.S. Census Bureau, the CDP has a total area of 1.26 square miles (3.26 km^{2}), of which 1.24 square miles (3.21 km^{2}) is land and 0.03 square miles (0.08 km^{2}) (2.38%) is water.

The community is served by Reading Community Schools to the west in Reading.

== Demographics ==
Historical population
Census	Pop.	Note	%±
2020	258		—
U.S. Decennial Census
