= Fayette Township, Michigan =

- Civil township
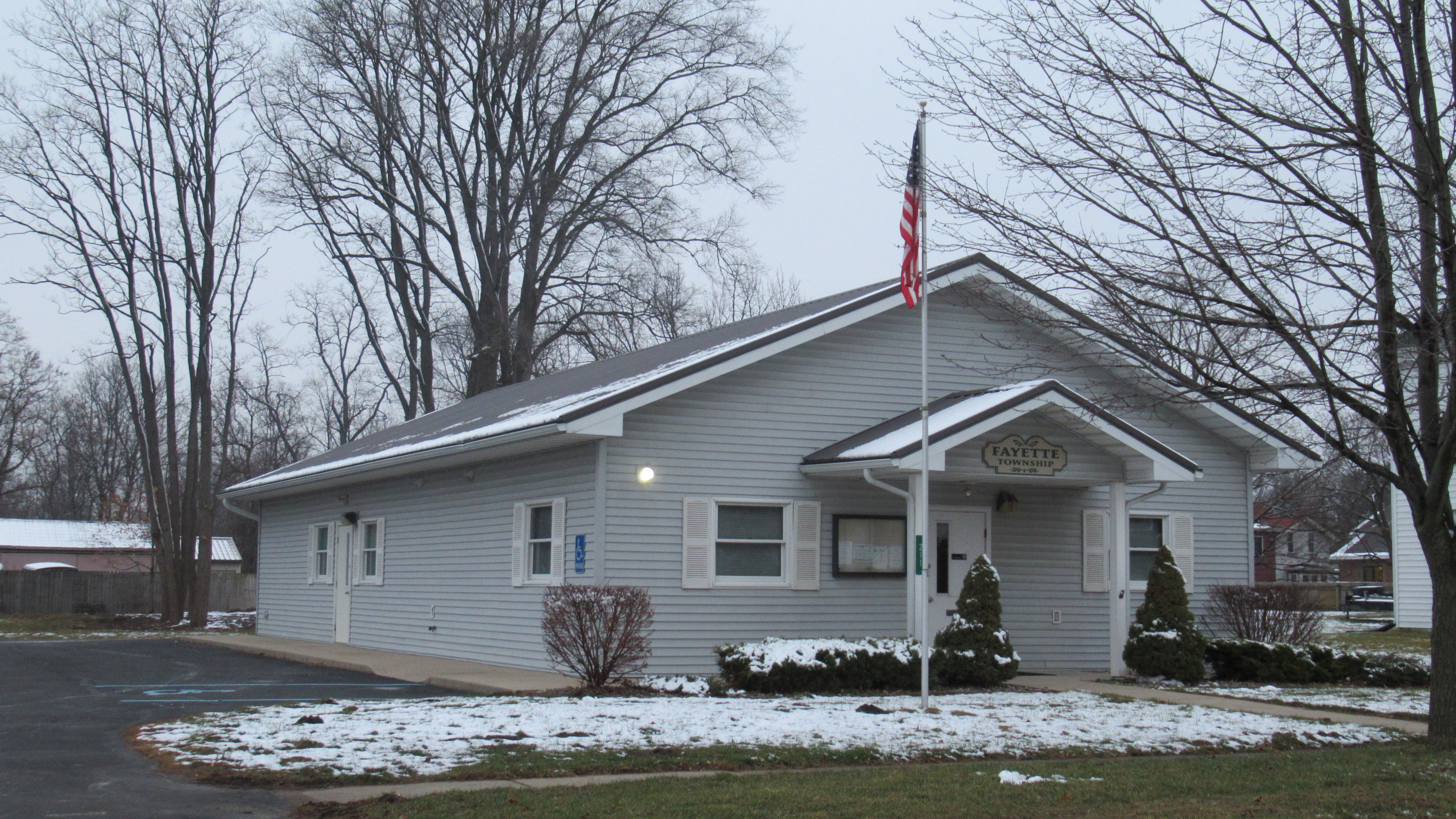
- Fayette Township Hall in Jonesville

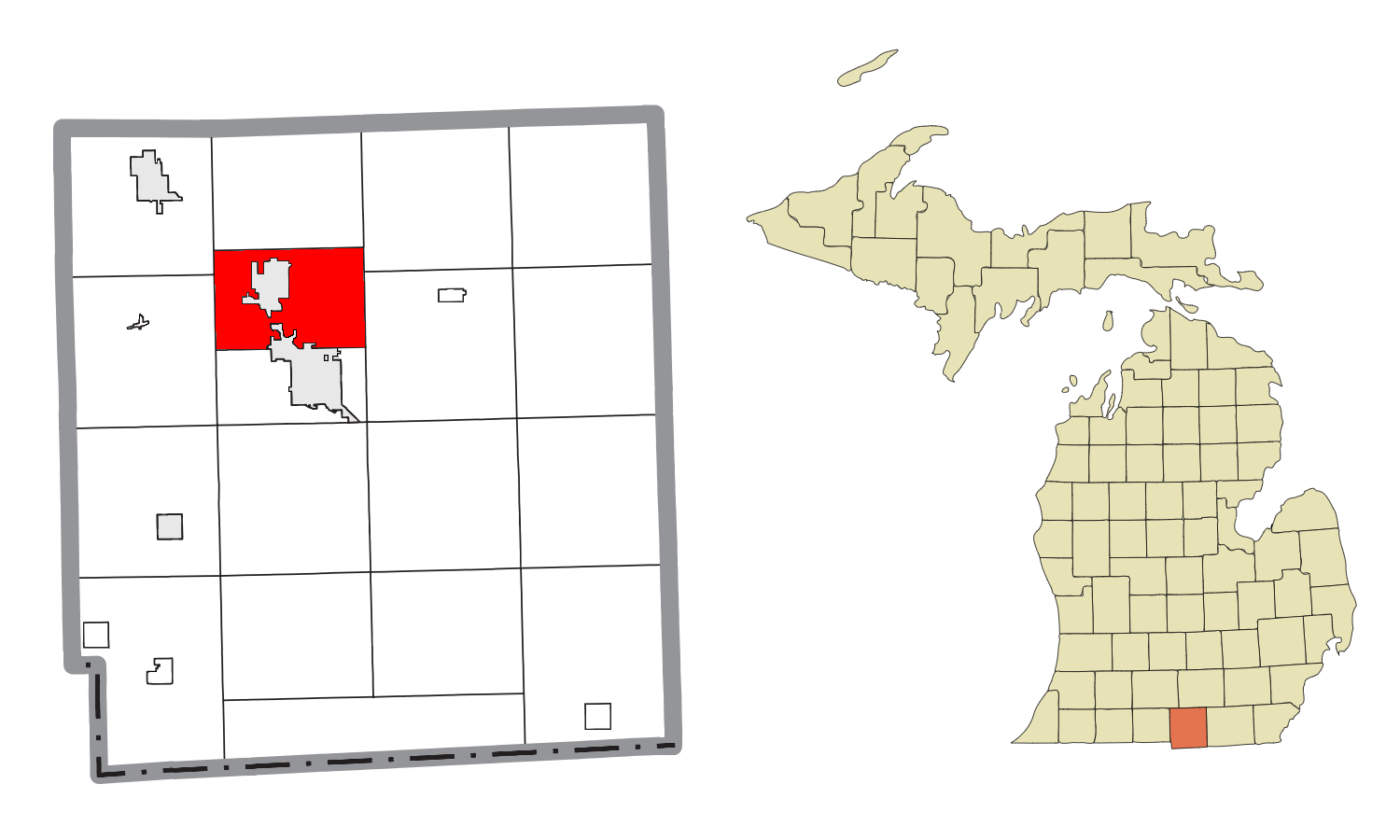
- Location within Hillsdale County

- Location within the state of Michigan Location within the United States
- Coordinates: 41°58′37″N 84°39′38″W
- Country: United States
- State: Michigan
- County: Hillsdale
- Established: 1835

Government
  - Supervisor: Anthony Baker
  - Clerk: Karen Sparks

Area
  - Total: 20.28 sq mi (52.52 km^{2})
  - Land: 20.04 sq mi (51.90 km^{2})
  - Water: 0.24 sq mi (0.62 km^{2})
- Elevation: 1,109 ft (338 m)

Population (2020)
  - Total: 1,113
  - Density: 49.4/sq mi (19.1/km^{2})
- Time zone: UTC-5 (Eastern (EST))
  - Summer (DST): UTC-4 (EDT)
- ZIP code(s): 49242 (Hillsdale); 49250 (Jonesville)
- Area code: 517
- FIPS code: 26-27580
- GNIS feature ID: 1626272

Fayette Township is a civil township of Hillsdale County in the U.S. state of Michigan. The population was 1,113 at the 2020 census, which ranks it the least-populated township in the county. This is a significant decrease from 3,326 at the 2010 census, which was due to the village of Jonesville incorporating as an autonomous city in 2014.

== Geography ==
According to the U.S. Census Bureau, the township has a total area of 20.28 square miles (52.52 km^{2}), of which 20.04 square miles (51.90 km^{2}) is land and 0.24 square miles (0.62 km^{2}) (1.18%) is water.

The St. Joseph River runs through the township.

=== Major highways ===
- US 12 (W. Chicago Street) runs through the northwest portion of the township.
- M-99 enters the township from the north into the city of Jonesville and through the south end of the township.

== Demographics ==
As of the census of 2000, there were 3,350 people, 1,303 households, and 925 families residing in the township. The population density was 144.8 inhabitants per square mile (55.9/km^{2}). There were 1,387 housing units at an average density of 59.9 per square mile (23.1/km^{2}). The racial makeup of the township was 96.42% White, 1.37% African American, 0.27% Native American, 0.18% Asian, 0.39% from other races, and 1.37% from two or more races. Hispanic or Latino of any race were 2.12% of the population.

There were 1,303 households, out of which 31.5% had children under the age of 18 living with them, 59.9% were married couples living together, 8.2% had a female householder with no husband present, and 29.0% were non-families. 25.1% of all households were made up of individuals, and 11.2% had someone living alone who was 65 years of age or older. The average household size was 2.47 and the average family size was 2.95.

In the township the population was spread out, with 27.4% under the age of 18, 7.7% from 18 to 24, 26.7% from 25 to 44, 24.2% from 45 to 64, and 14.1% who were 65 years of age or older. The median age was 37 years. For every 100 females, there were 101.8 males. For every 100 females age 18 and over, there were 95.1 males.

The median income for a household in the township was $38,974, and the median income for a family was $44,000. Males had a median income of $36,384 versus $25,614 for females. The per capita income for the township was $17,629. About 4.6% of families and 7.3% of the population were below the poverty line, including 7.0% of those under age 18 and 4.1% of those age 65 or over.

== Education ==
The township is served by two separate public school districts. The northern portion of the township is served by Jonesville Community Schools, while the southern section near Hillsdale is served by Hillsdale Community Schools.
