= Grace Episcopal Church (Jonesville, Michigan) =

Historic church in Michigan, United States

- U.S. National Register of Historic Places
- Michigan State Historic Site
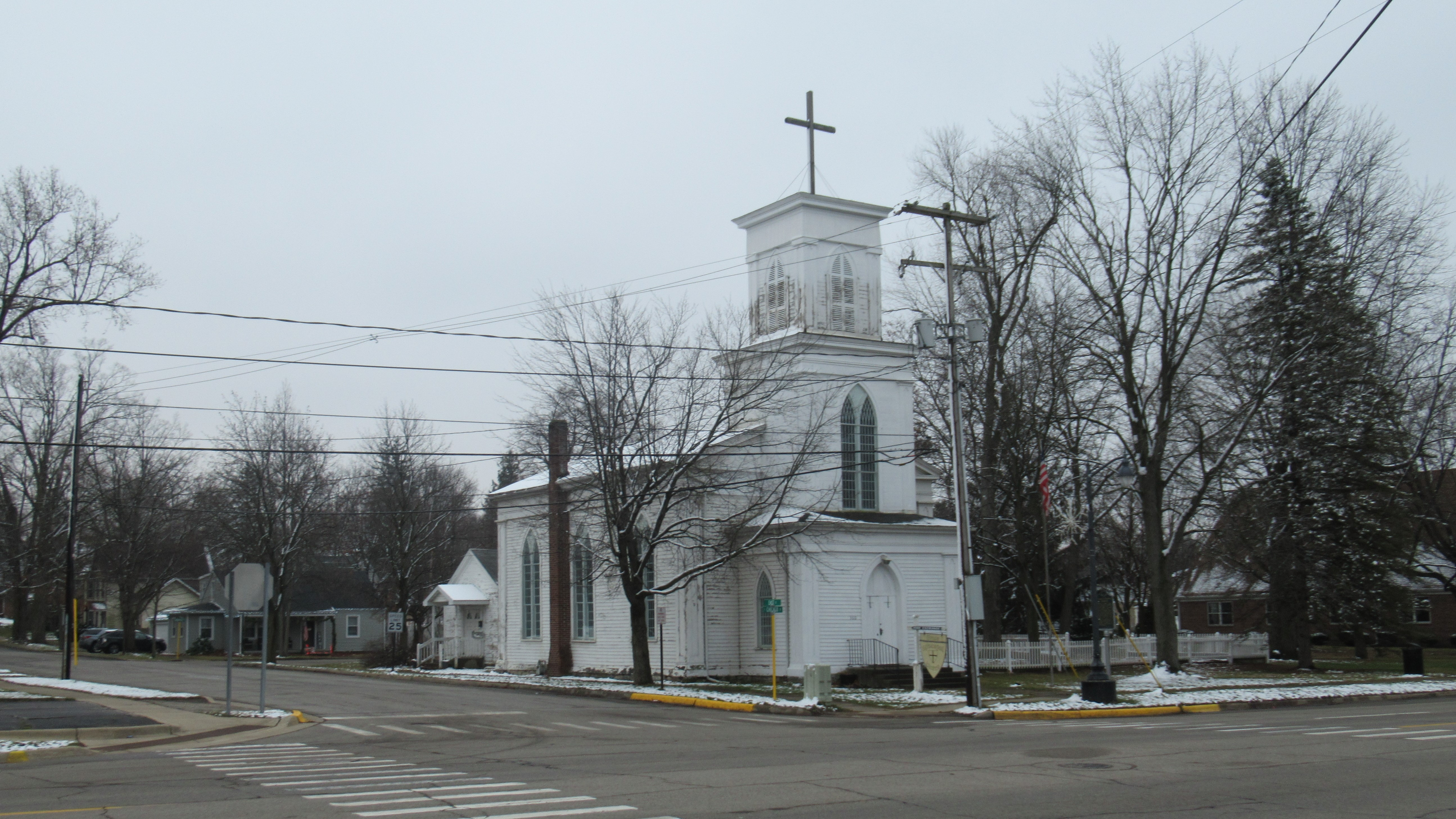

- Location within Michigan Location within the United States
- Interactive map
- Location: 360 E. Chicago Street; Jonesville, Michigan
- Coordinates: 41°59′3″N 84°39′37″W
- Area: Less than one acre
- Built: 1848
- Architectural style: Gothic, Greek Revival
- NRHP reference No.: 71000391

Significant dates
- Added to NRHP: May 6, 1971
- Designated MSHS: January 6, 1971

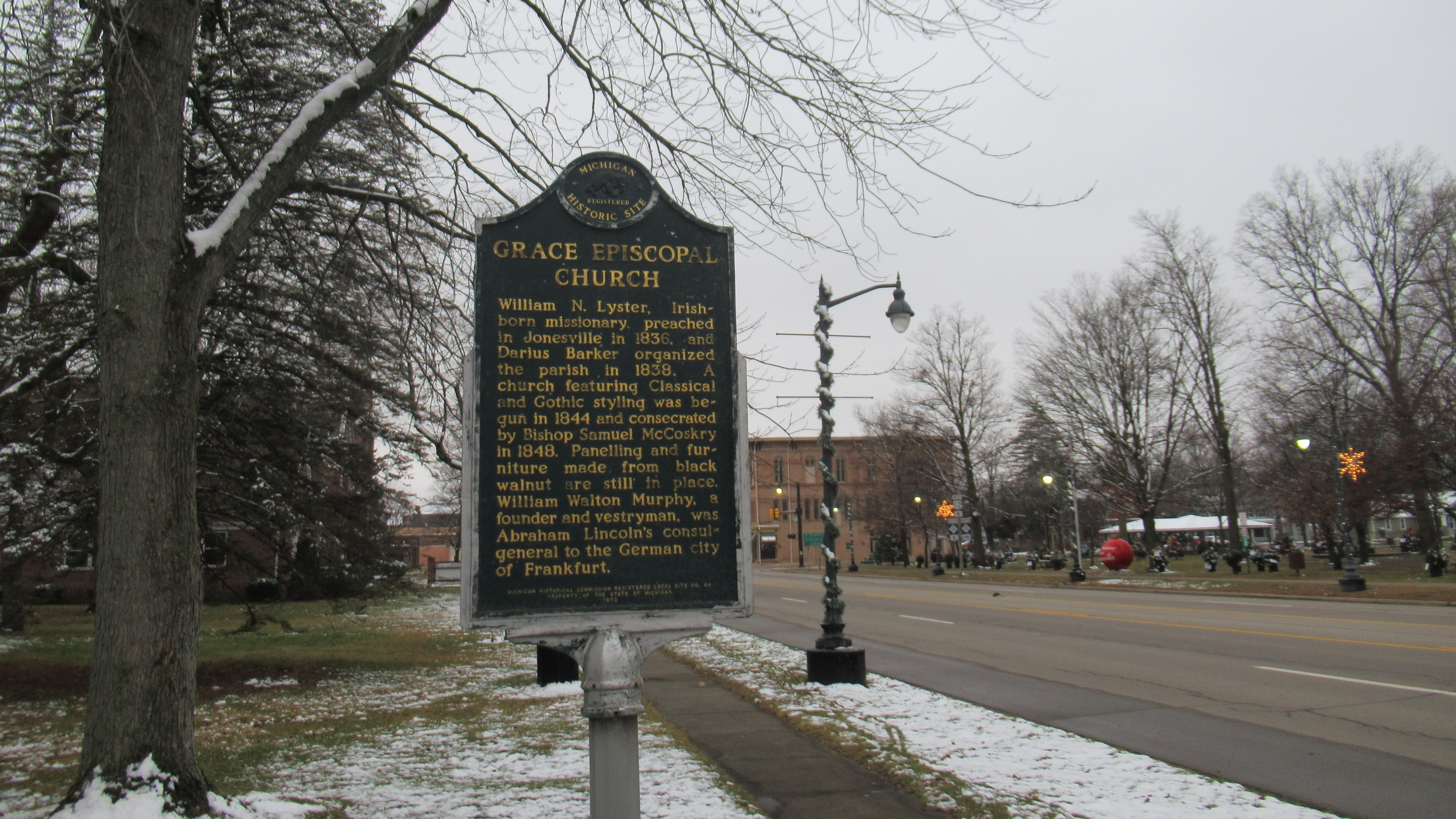
Michigan state historic marker

Grace Episcopal Church is a historic church at 360 East Chicago Street in Jonesville, Michigan. It was designated a Michigan State Historic Site and listed on the National Register of Historic Places in 1971. It is one of the first church buildings constructed in Michigan west of Detroit, and is one of the few surviving examples of indigenous church architecture in the state.

== History ==
In 1833, the Episcopal missionary William N. Lyster left Ireland for the United States, and eventually became the restor of a mission in Tecumseh, Michigan. From there, he traveled throughout southern Michigan to minister to isolated communities; in 1836 he held the first church service in Jonesville. Two years later, a parish was organized by Darius Barker. In 1844, the congregation began constructing this church; it was completed on November 15, 1848, at a cost of $3,000.

In 1946, an old schoolhouse was moved to the site of the church to serve as a parish hall. The church was deconsecrated and sold in 2007, and then served as a coffee house. In 2021, the church was purchased by investors. The fellowship area has been renovated into a rentable AirBNB site that can sleep up to six people. The sanctuary is being refurnished and can be used for events such as weddings.

== Description ==
Grace Episcopal Church is a 1-1/2 story rectangular Greek Revival frame structure covered in clapboard. The building has a single-story projecting entry vestibule, atop which is a square tower which intersects with the main structure. Square pilasters run up each corner of the building, and both the entry projection and the main structure are topped with a gable roof.

Gothic double-arched lancet windows line the sides of the building, providing the building with a somewhat rare mix of Greek Revival and Gothic styles. Similar single-arched windows are on each side of the entry vestibule.

Black walnut paneling lined the interior, and the pews are constructed of the same wood. A small altar, also of black walnut, is set amongst frescoes.
