= William Treadwell House =

Historic house in Michigan, United States

- U.S. National Register of Historic Places
- Michigan State Historic Site
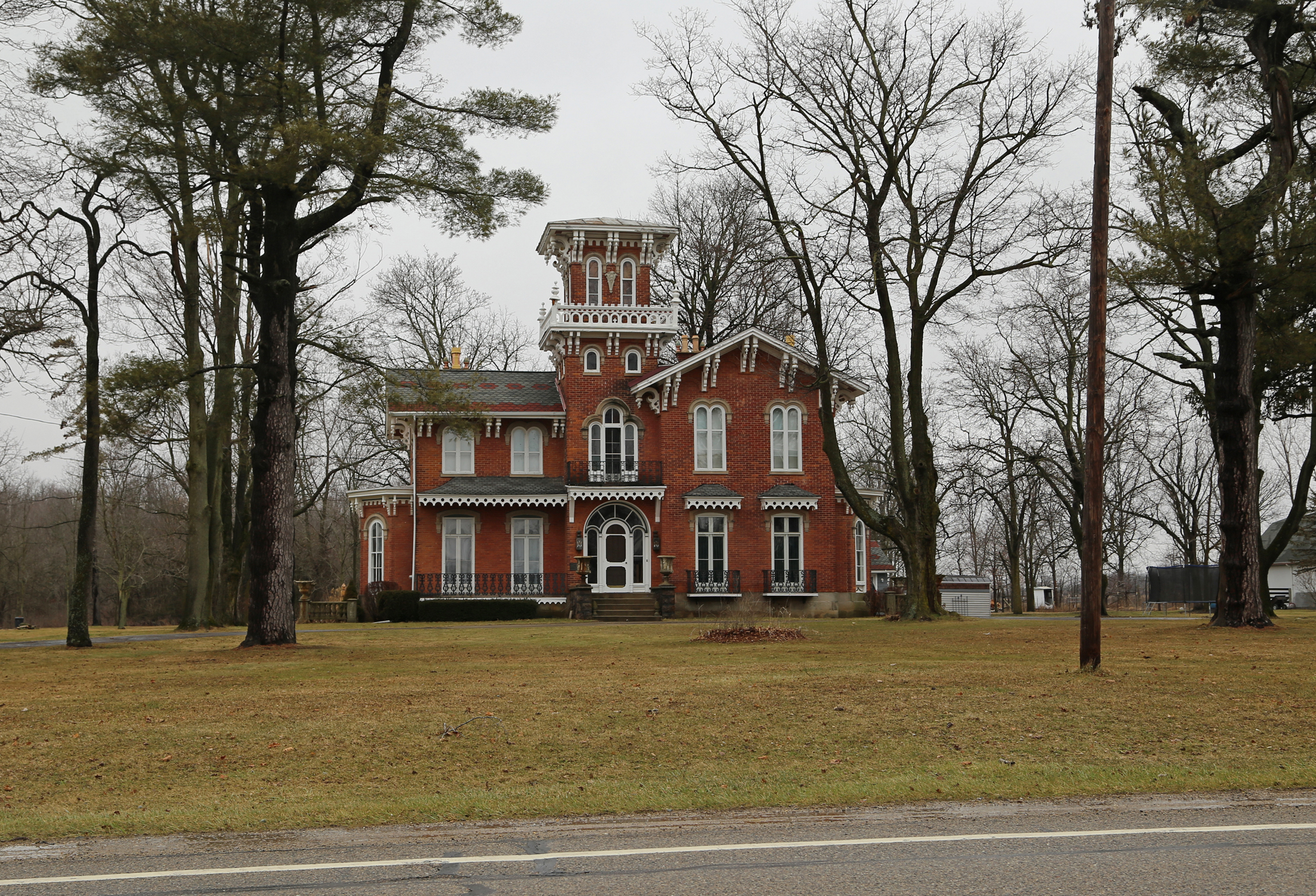
- William Treadwell House, 2018

- Location within Michigan Location within the United States
- Interactive map
- Location: 446 N. Meridian Rd., Hudson, Michigan
- Coordinates: 41°51′47″N 84°21′53″W
- Area: 9 acres (3.6 ha)
- Built: 1860
- Architectural style: Italian Villa
- NRHP reference No.: 74000984

Significant dates
- Added to NRHP: December 31, 1974
- Designated MSHS: February 22, 1974

The William Treadwell House, also known as the Bruce Coleman House, is a private house located at 446 North Meridian Road in Hudson, Michigan. It was designated a Michigan State Historic Site and listed on the National Register of Historic Places in 1974.

== History ==
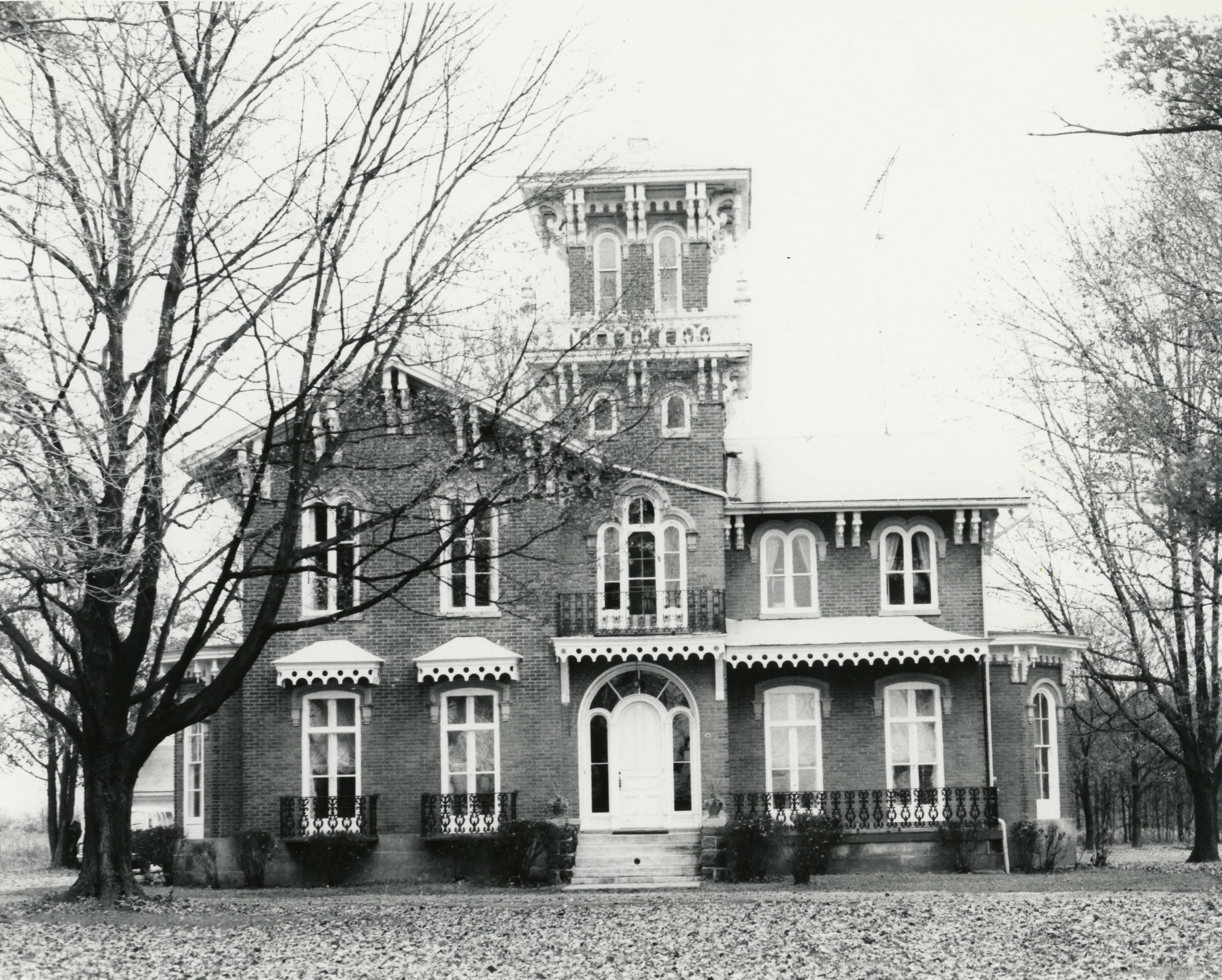
William Treadwell House, 1974

William Treadwell grew up in Hudson, and began his career as a dry goods clerk. He later began working in the People's State Bank in Hudson to learn the business, and in 1859, William and his father Urias purchased the bank, with William providing the management and his father the capital. In 1862 William Treadwell married Mary Hester, and around the same time he began building this house. However, in early 1864, William Treadwell concocted a scheme to embezzle money from the bank, and on January 20, left town with $66,000 in his suitcase. Three weeks later he was caught in Ohio with his wife and in-laws and returned to Michigan, where he was tried and convicted. On the afternoon of his sentencing, Treadwell escaped jail with an accomplice. The accomplice later murdered Treadwell for the money in his pocket; Treadwell's body was found in the woods two weeks later. Treadwell never occupied the house he had built.

The William Treadwell House is currently a private residence.

== Description ==
The William Treadwell House is a two-story brick Italian Villa structure on a cut stone foundation. Two bays balance the main mass of the house, and it is surmounted by a gable roof. External architectural embellishments include elaborate brackets, wrought iron railings, rounded arch windows and doorways, and a two-tiered, square tower. Although the interior has been extensively altered, the exterior remains original.
