= Cambria Township, Michigan =

- Civil township
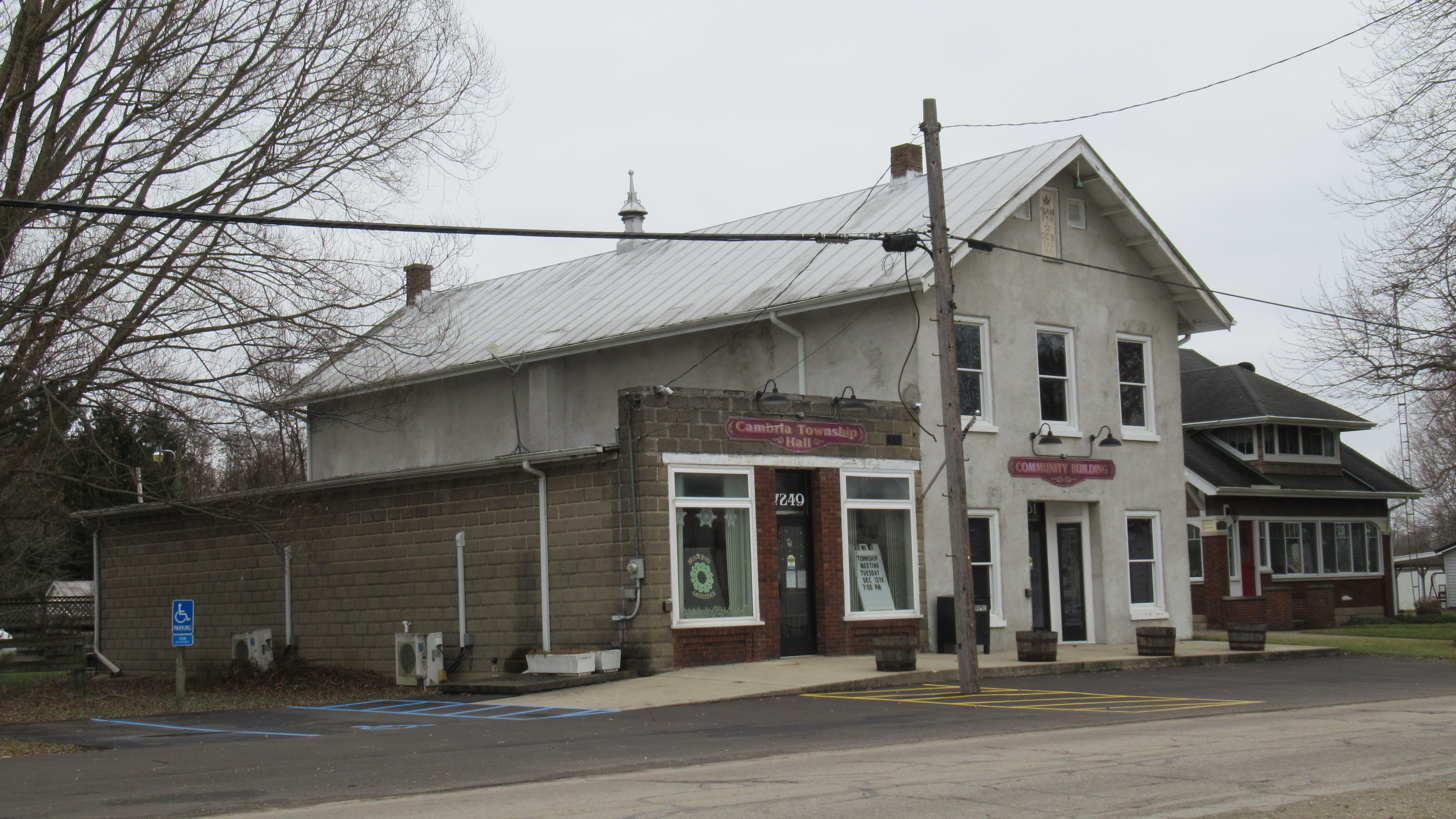
- Township Hall and Community Center

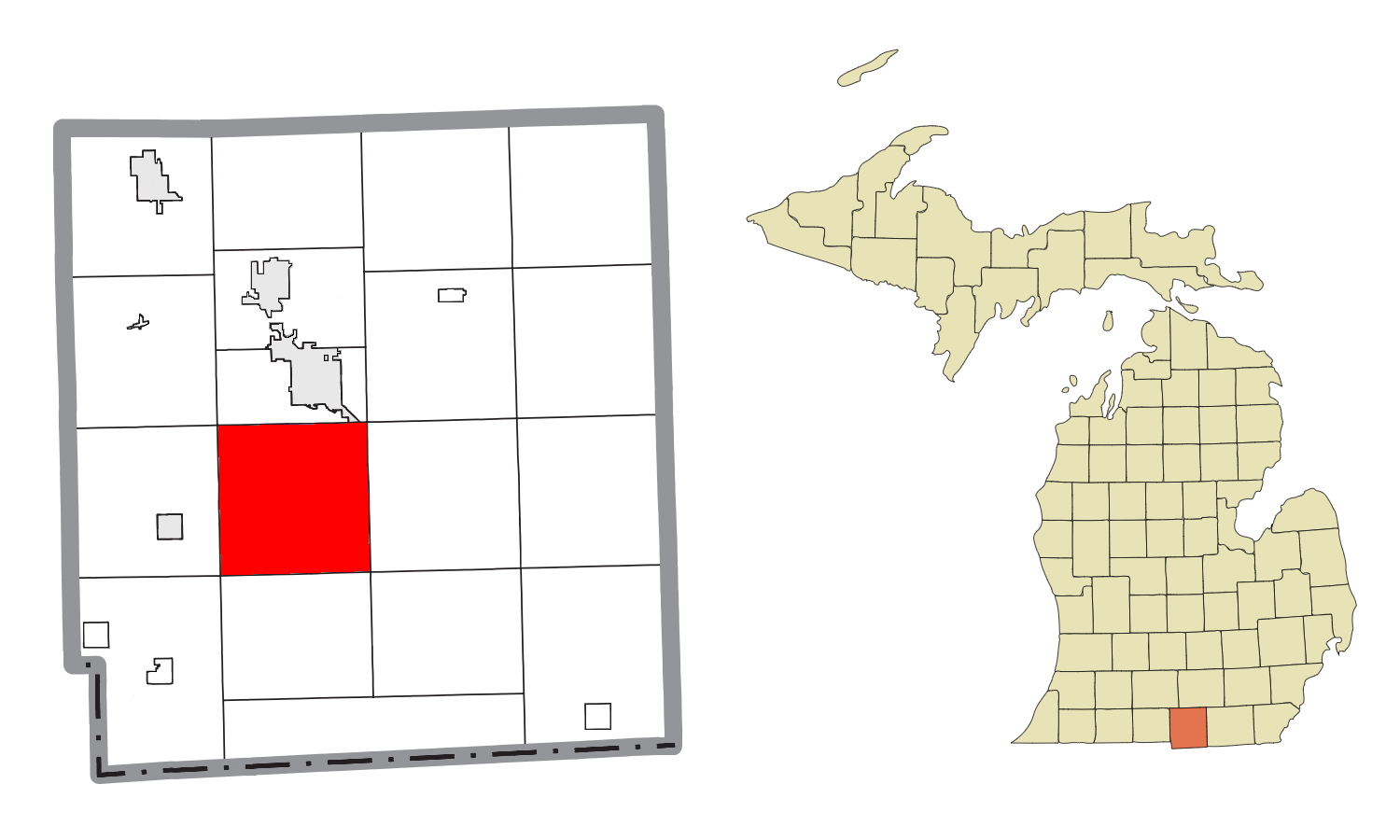
- Location within Hillsdale County

- Location within the state of Michigan Location within the United States
- Coordinates: 41°51′56″N 84°39′33″W
- Country: United States
- State: Michigan
- County: Hillsdale
- Established: 1841

Government
  - Supervisor: Glenn Frobel
  - Clerk: Carol Rosales

Area
  - Total: 36.14 sq mi (93.60 km^{2})
  - Land: 34.81 sq mi (90.16 km^{2})
  - Water: 1.33 sq mi (3.44 km^{2})
- Elevation: 1,119 ft (341 m)

Population (2020)
  - Total: 2,229
  - Density: 64/sq mi (25/km^{2})
- Time zone: UTC-5 (Eastern (EST))
  - Summer (DST): UTC-4 (EDT)
- ZIP code(s): 49242 (Hillsdale); 49266 (Osseo); 49274 (Reading)
- Area code: 517
- FIPS code: 26-12700
- GNIS feature ID: 1626025

Cambria Township is a civil township of Hillsdale County in the U.S. state of Michigan. The population was 2,229 at the 2020 census.

== History ==
Cambria Township was established in 1841 and named after Cambria, New York, which was the hometown of many of the area's early settlers.

== Communities ==
- Bankers is an unincorporated community located in the northern portion of the township on the border with Hillsdale Township at 41°53′52″N 84°41′29″W. The community was founded by Horace and George Banker in 1838 and was platted in 1869. In 1871, a railway line of the Detroit, Hillsdale & Indiana Railroad was built through the area, in which Bankers was the southern terminus of a line that ran north to Ypsilanti. Bankers centered around a sawmill and was referred to as Bankers Station, and a post office operated here from January 30, 1872 until January 31, 1909.
- Cambria is an unincorporated community and census-designated place located in the southern portion of the township at 41°49′19″N 84°39′54″W.
- Steamburg is an unincorporated community located within the township at 41°52′33″N 84°36′45″W. It was named from the steam sawmill built by Chauncey Ferris, and the community had its own post office from December 9, 1896 until May 31, 1902. The community was the location of the historic Bates homestead, which was heavily damaged in the 1965 Palm Sunday tornado outbreak and later demolished.

== Geography ==
According to the U.S. Census Bureau, the township has a total area of 36.14 square miles (93.60 km^{2}), of which 34.81 square miles (90.16 km^{2}) is land and 1.33 square miles (3.44 km^{2}) (3.68%) is water.

=== Major highways ===
- M-99 (Hudson Road) runs briefly through the northeast corner of the township.

== Demographics ==
As of the census of 2000, there were 2,546 people, 986 households, and 725 families residing in the township. The population density was 73.0 inhabitants per square mile (28.2/km^{2}). There were 1,264 housing units at an average density of 36.2 per square mile (14.0/km^{2}). The racial makeup of the township was 97.05% White, 0.43% African American, 0.39% Native American, 0.59% Asian, 0.43% from other races, and 1.10% from two or more races. Hispanic or Latino of any race were 0.63% of the population.

There were 986 households, out of which 32.2% had children under the age of 18 living with them, 61.3% were married couples living together, 7.4% had a female householder with no husband present, and 26.4% were non-families. 21.4% of all households were made up of individuals, and 7.6% had someone living alone who was 65 years of age or older. The average household size was 2.58 and the average family size was 2.97.

In the township the population was spread out, with 26.8% under the age of 18, 7.4% from 18 to 24, 27.7% from 25 to 44, 24.5% from 45 to 64, and 13.6% who were 65 years of age or older. The median age was 38 years. For every 100 females, there were 107.0 males. For every 100 females age 18 and over, there were 102.8 males.

The median income for a household in the township was $40,889, and the median income for a family was $46,650. Males had a median income of $38,031 versus $22,543 for females. The per capita income for the township was $20,109. About 6.5% of families and 8.2% of the population were below the poverty line, including 5.0% of those under age 18 and 10.7% of those age 65 or over.

== Education ==
The township is served by three separate public school districts. The majority of the township is served by Hillsdale Community Schools. The southwest portion of the township is served by Reading Community Schools, while a very small southeast portion is served by Camden-Frontier Schools.

== Images ==
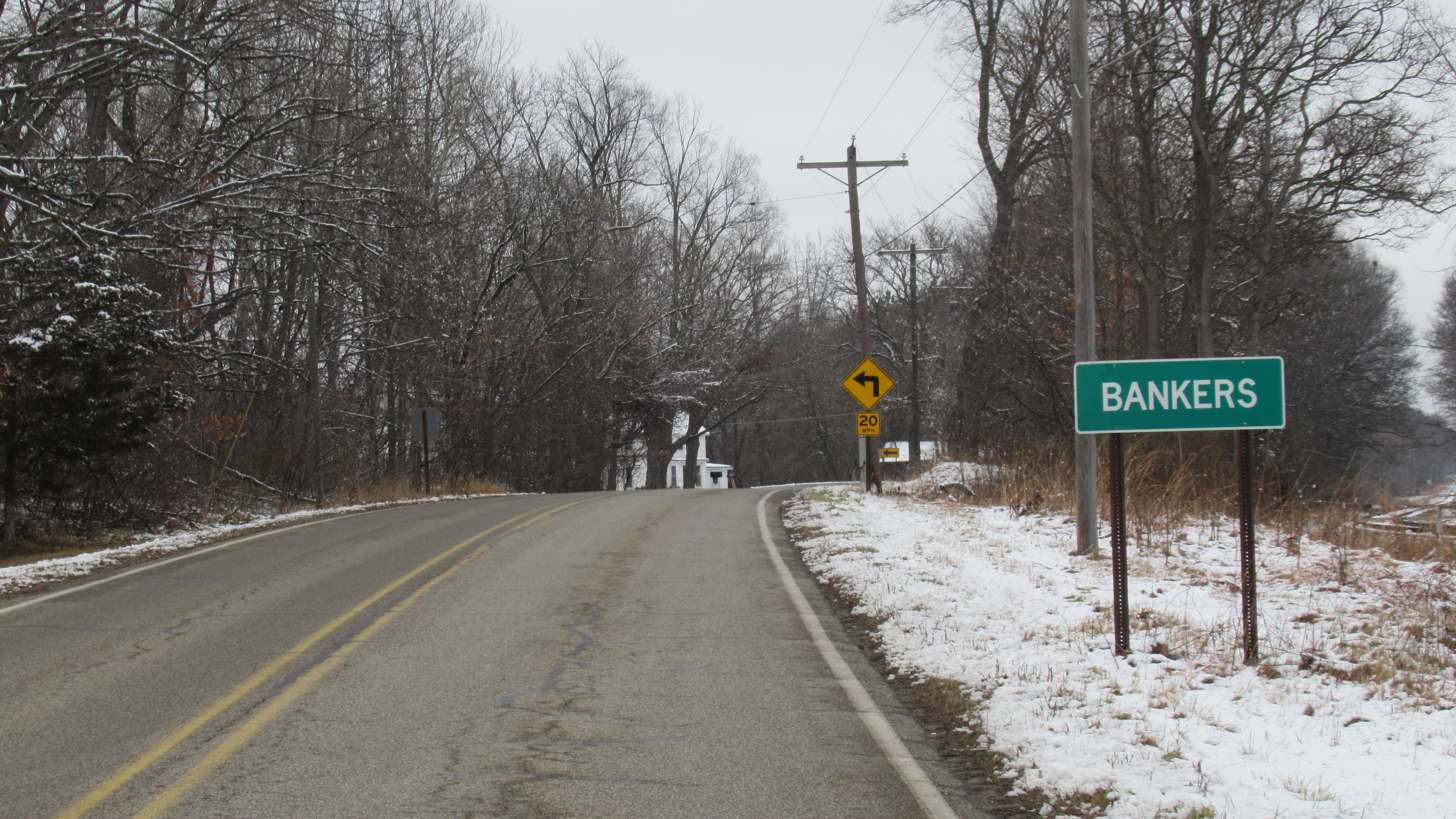
Northbound Bankers Road

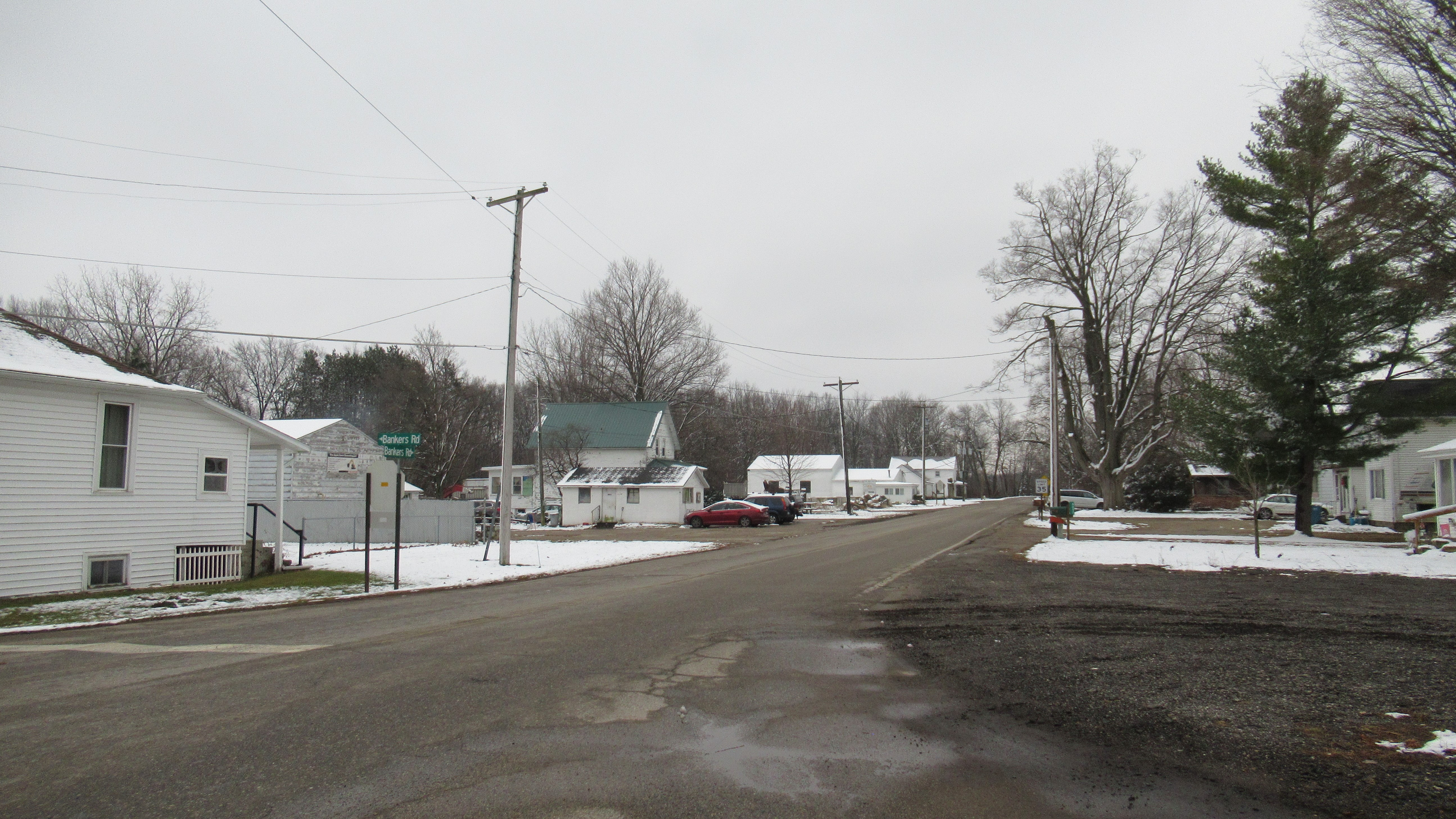
Unincorporated community of Bankers

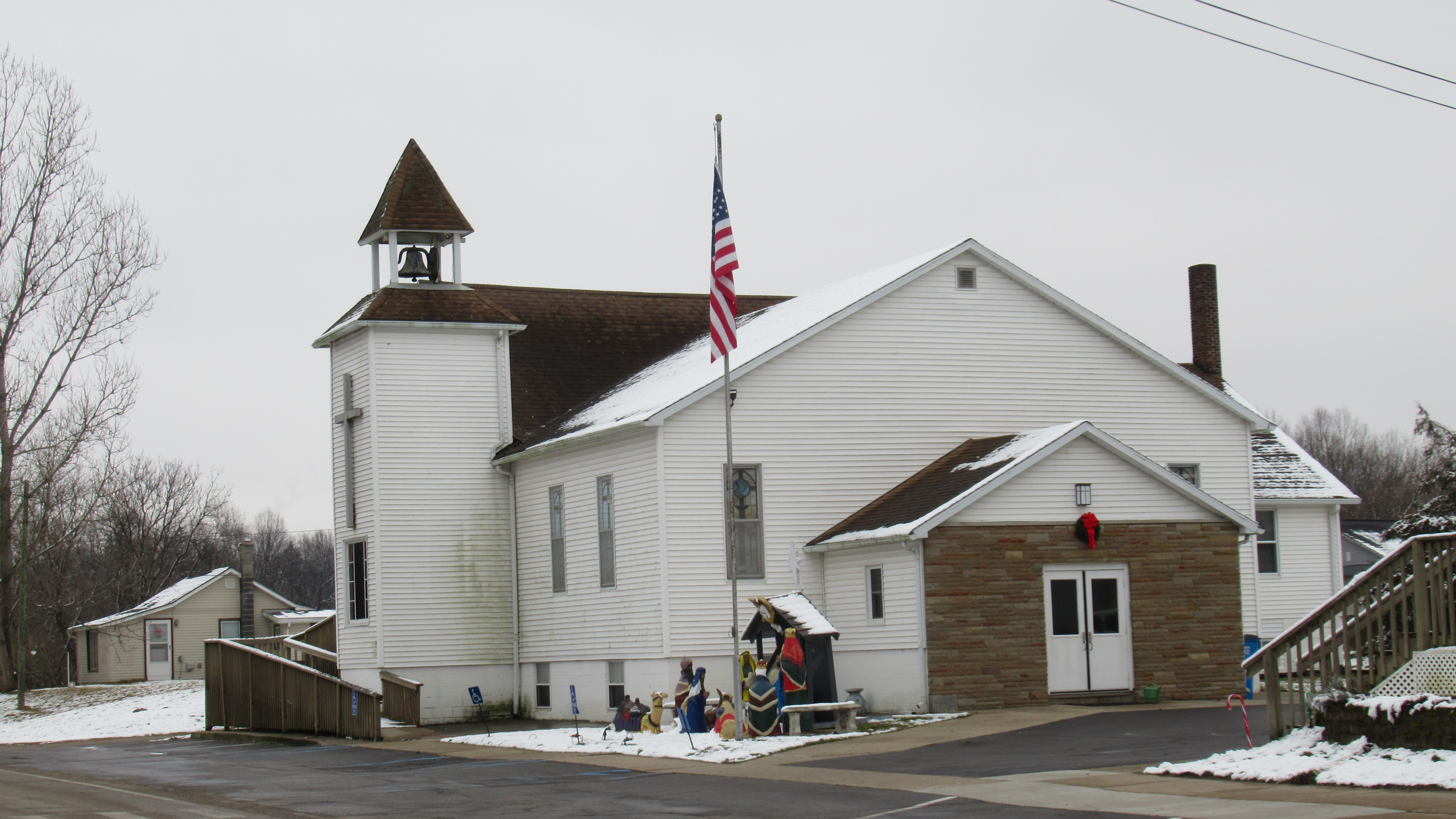
Bankers Baptist Church

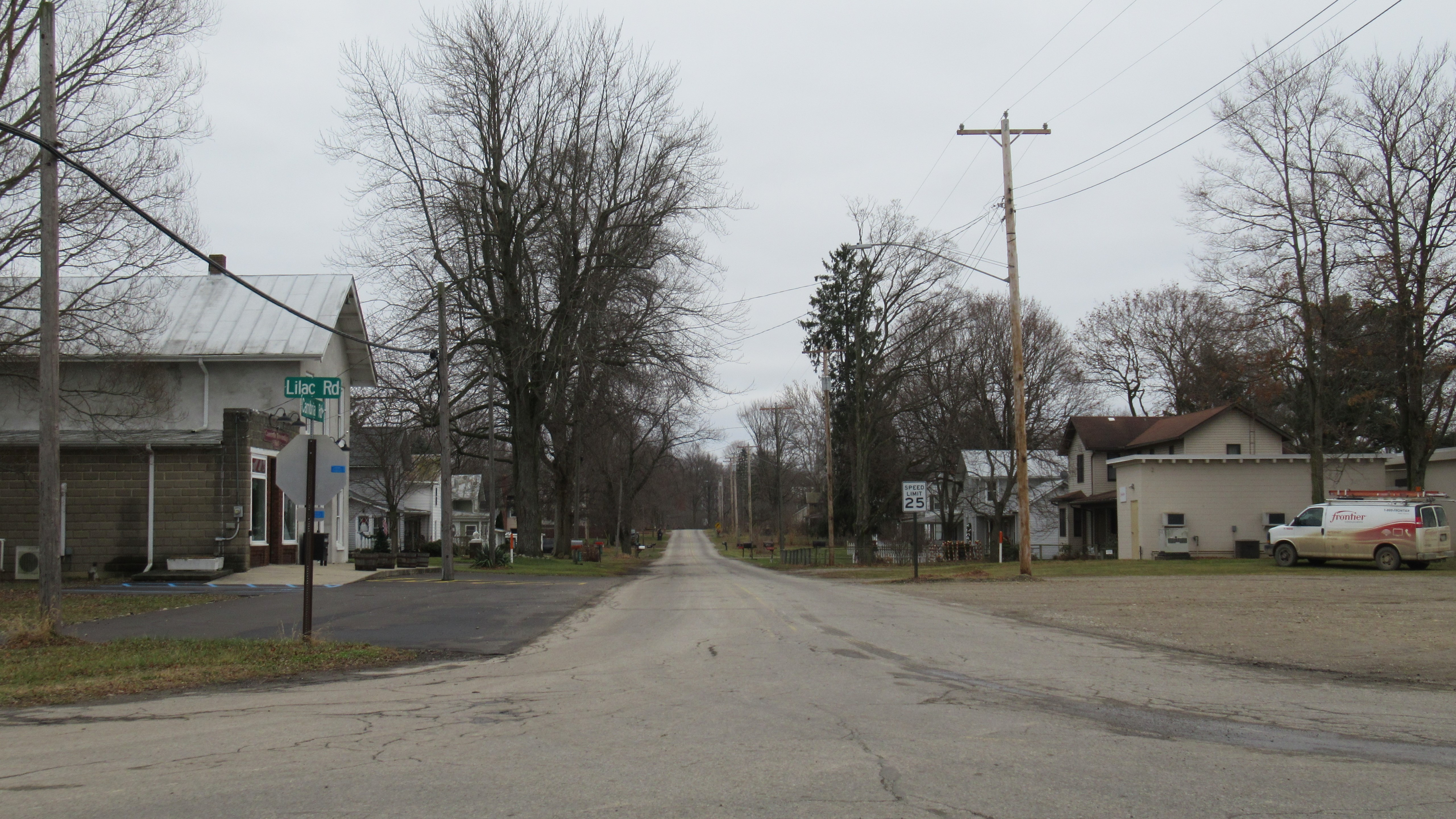
Unincorporated community of Cambria
