= Hillsdale High School =

Hillsdale High School may refer to:

- Hillsdale High School (San Mateo) — San Mateo, California
- Hillsdale High School (Michigan) — Hillsdale, Michigan
- Hillsdale High School (Ohio) — Jeromesville, Ohio
- Kremlin-Hillsdale High School — Kremlin, Oklahoma
