= J.J. Deal and Son Carriage Factory =

- U.S. National Register of Historic Places
- Michigan State Historic Site
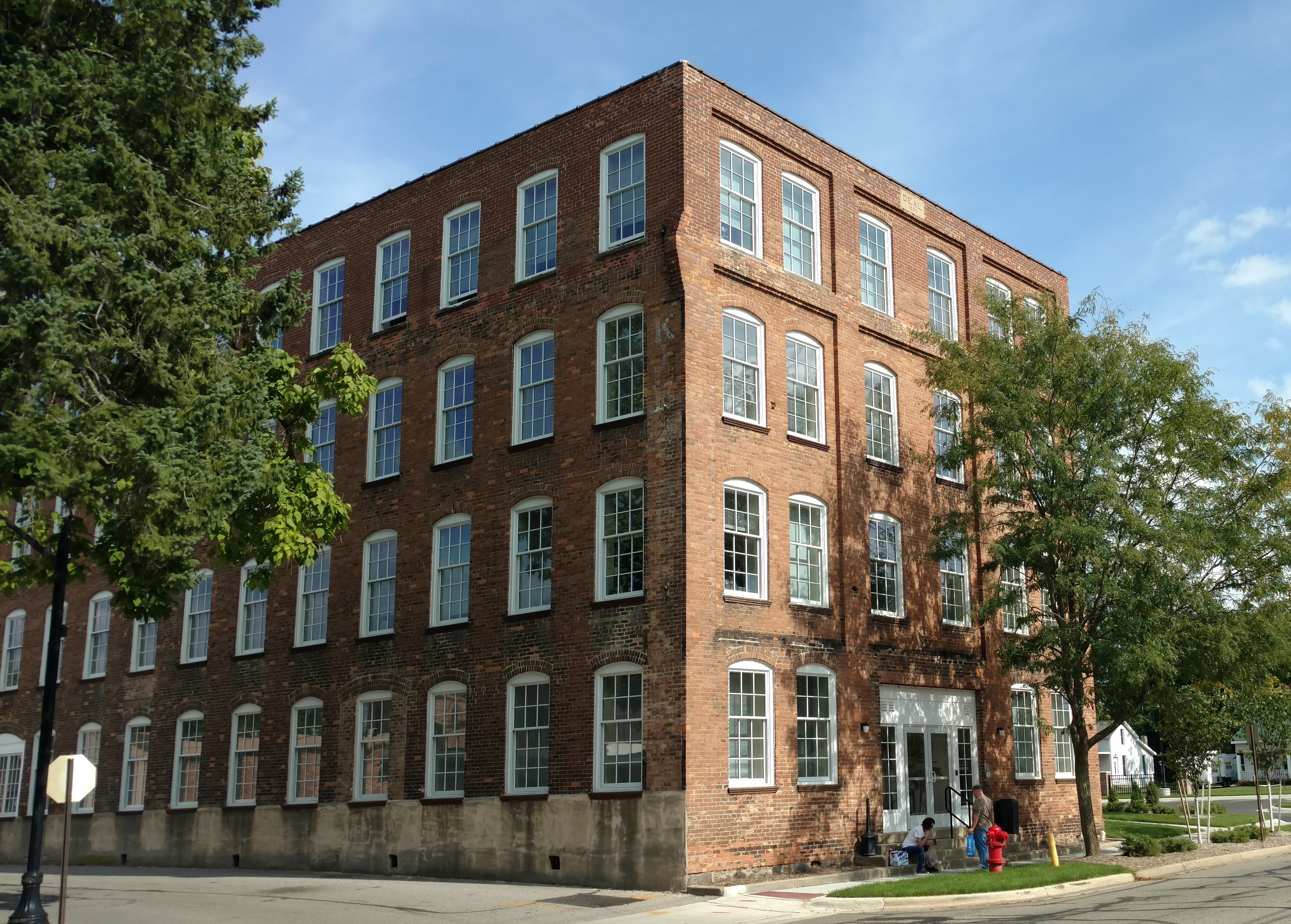
- J.J. Deal and Son Carriage Factory, Jonesville, Michigan, built in portions from 1893 to 1909. Now the Heritage Lane Apartments.

- Location within Michigan Location within the United States
- Interactive map
- Location: 117 West St., Jonesville, Michigan
- Coordinates: 41°58′59″N 84°39′48″W
- Area: 1 acre (0.40 ha)
- Built: 1893
- Architectural style: Commercial Style
- NRHP reference No.: 12000456
- Added to NRHP: August 1, 2012

The J.J. Deal and Son Carriage Factory, located at 117 West Street, was the largest factory built in Jonesville, Michigan and is the only 19th century factory remaining in the city. On August 1, 2012, the building was added to the National Register of Historic Places. In 2015, the building was redeveloped into the Heritage Lane Apartments.

== J.J. Deal and Son History ==
Jacob J. Deal was a blacksmith who moved to Jonesville, Michigan in 1857. Once he relocated to Jonesville, Deal began to manufacture a small number of lumber wagons and other heavy wagons. Deal sold his blacksmith shop in 1865 and erected two small buildings across the street, where he began the full-time manufacture of wagons and carriages. As the business grew, he repeatedly enlarged his factory. In 1890, he began construction on a new factory building, forming the core of the structure which still stands today. A number of additions were made to the building from 1893 to 1909, and the factory eventually employed over 100 men. In 1891, Deal's son, George, became a partner and began managing the company, which was renamed J.J. Deal and Son.

== The Deal Motor Vehicle Company ==
In 1890 George motorized one of Deal's buggies and used is as his personal car. According to some sources, George is believed to have motorized a few more buggies for customers. The company called these motorized buggies the Autobuggy. They are also believed to have motorized some wagon for use as trucks. None of these survive.

In 1908 company was reorganized under the name of the Deal Motor Vehicle Company and began making their own automobiles. By 1910, the number of workers had increased to 140. Several models of the Deal Automobile were manufactured from 1908 until 1911, with costs ranging from about US$950 to US$1,250. All models had a four-cylinder engine with 30 hp. The Model S was available from 1908 to 1910 for a base price of US$950. The vehicle was an open runabout with four seats, but no doors. It had a wheelbase of 259 cm and solid rubber tires.

In 1911 the Model S was rebranded as the Model C The vehicle was bodied as a four-seater Surrey and sold for US$1,000. The Model R also debuted that year. The Model R's chassis was slightly extended and had a 264 cm wheelbase. It was an open touring car with seating for five people and sold for US$1,250.

As of 2015, only two Deal automobiles were known to exist. One, formerly located at Harrah's Casino in Las Vegas, was sold to a private collector. The other was on display in the Jonesville City Building in Jonesville.

== Demise ==
After this demand began to fall for Deal's products due to increasing competition from other automobile manufacturers and reduced demand for buggies and wagons. Coupled with this was the death or departure of the company's leadership. George died in 1908, Omar Dickerson left the company in 1913, and Jacob Deal died in 1914. The company went out of business in 1915.

== Gallery ==
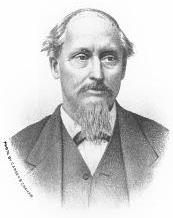
J.J. Deal

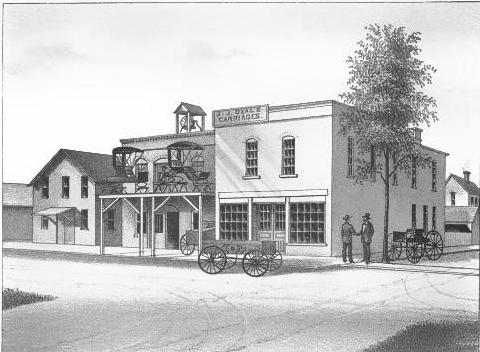
JJ Deal Carriage Factory c 1879

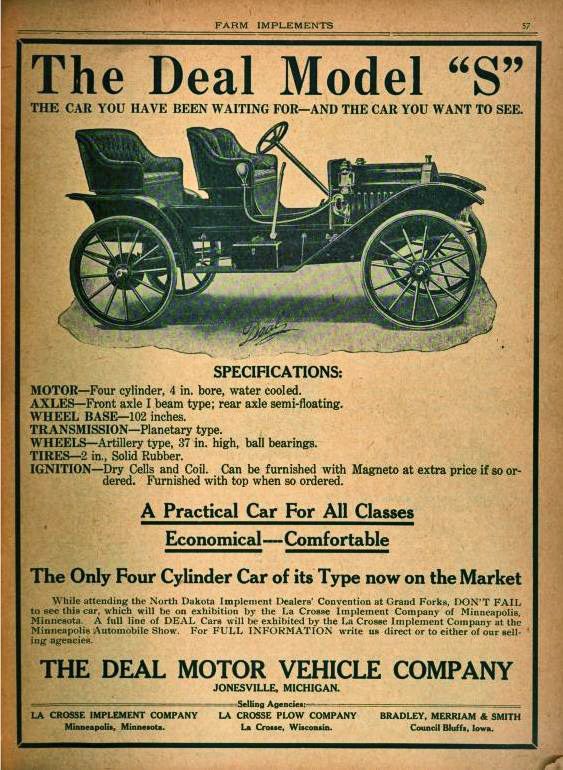
Deal Motor Car Model S ad, 1910

== Factories Later History ==
The Universal Body Company took over the entire complex in 1918, where it manufactured motor bus bodies. In 1927, the Kiddie Brush & Toy Company took over the factory. The company made children's housekeeping toys, which were sold under the Susy Goose name. In 1949, it started making plastic injection molded toys then in the 1960s made Barbie and Ken furniture and accessories for Mattel. In 1967, the company moved its headquarters to Edon, Ohio. In 1972, the J.R. Headers Company moved into the space but only for a short time until 1976 when it moved out.

Over the next 40 years, the building stood underutilized or vacant until 2014, when the Michigan State Housing Development Authority approved a tax credit application by Excel-Sterling LDHA LP to provide Section 42 tax credits for the re-development of the building. Construction began in 2015 to redevelop the property into the "Heritage Lane Apartments," to provide residential living for 44 families over four floors. Construction on the building was completed in July 2016. The completed building includes a computer room, management and maintenance offices, a resident library and historic interior décor. An original JJ Deal Buggy built in the 1890s stands in the building's lobby. A Michigan historic marker stands at the edge of the Heritage Lane property and identifies the building and its historical context.

== Building Description ==
The J.J. Deal and Son Carriage Factory is a four-story brick building with a long rectangular footprint. The front of the building contains three bays separated by brick piers. The center bay contains an entrance with transom window above. Double-hung windows in jack-arch openings are located in the side bays and in the upper floors. Brick bands run across the top of the third floor and fourth floor. The side elevation contains 30 equally spaced openings on each floor. Two openings on the first floor contain entrances; the remaining openings contain double-hung windows similar to those on the front elevation.

The building is representative of late 19th century mill and factory buildings constructed in Michigan and across the United States.
