= Hillsdale Township, Michigan =

- Civil township
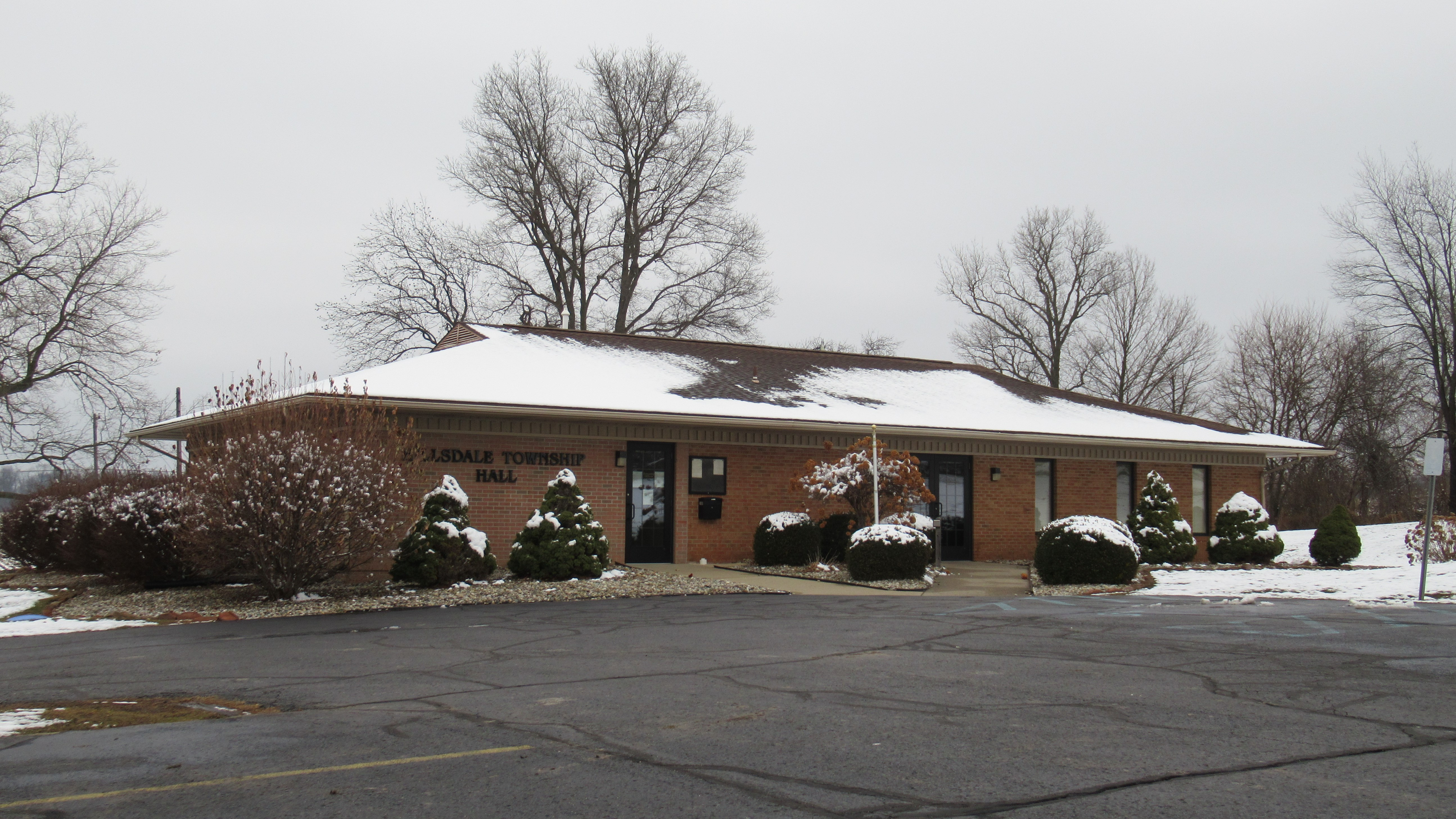
- Hillsdale Township Hall

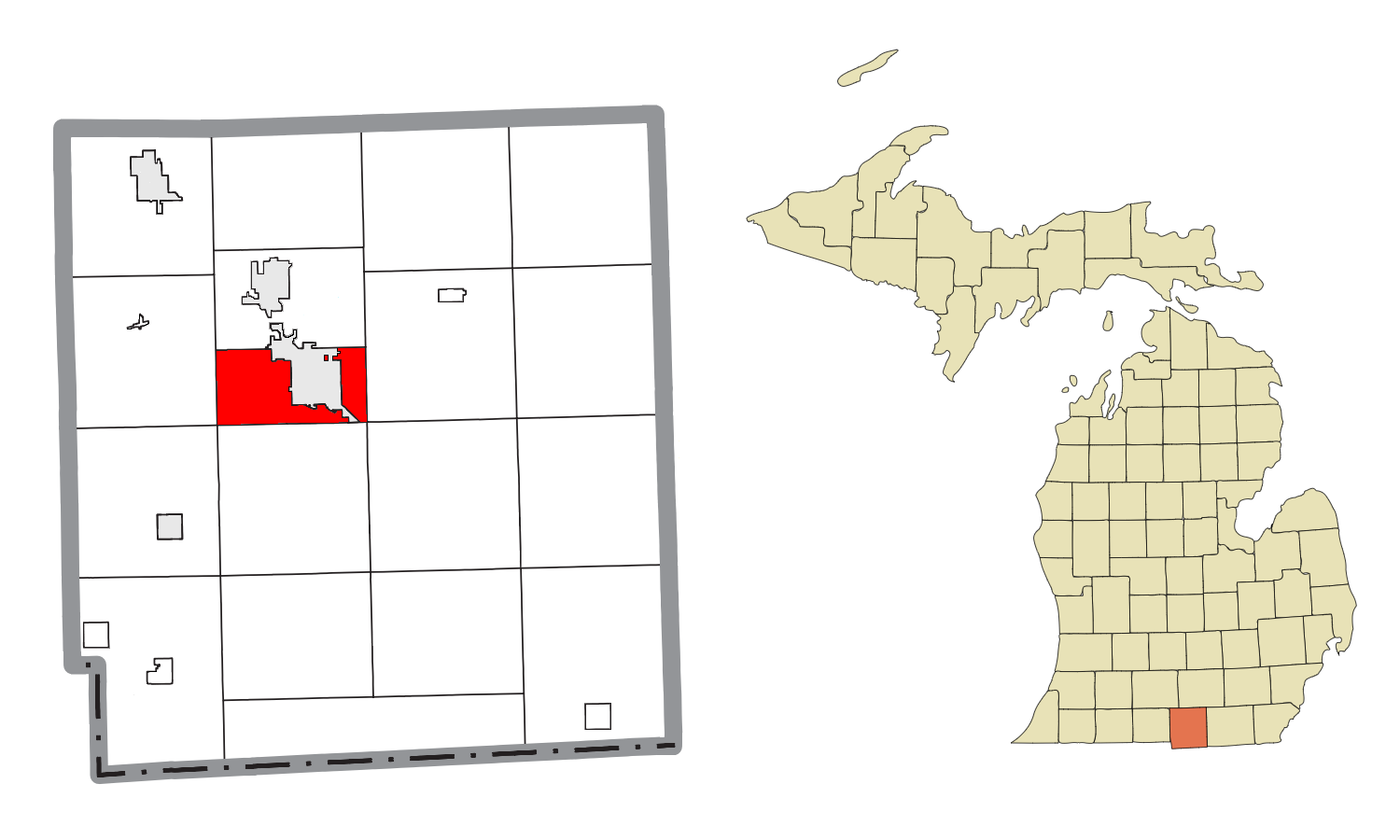
- Location within Hillsdale County

- Location within the state of Michigan Location within the United States
- Coordinates: 41°55′14″N 84°39′12″W
- Country: United States
- State: Michigan
- County: Hillsdale
- Established: 1855

Government
  - Supervisor: Jacquelyn Sullivan
  - Clerk: Janel Stewart

Area
  - Total: 12.89 sq mi (33.38 km^{2})
  - Land: 12.32 sq mi (31.91 km^{2})
  - Water: 0.57 sq mi (1.48 km^{2})
- Elevation: 1,178 ft (359 m)

Population (2020)
  - Total: 2,133
  - Density: 173.1/sq mi (66.8/km^{2})
- Time zone: UTC-5 (Eastern (EST))
  - Summer (DST): UTC-4 (EDT)
- ZIP code(s): 49242 (Hillsdale)
- Area code: 517
- FIPS code: 26-38480
- GNIS feature ID: 1626475
- Website: Official website

Hillsdale Township is a civil township of Hillsdale County in the U.S. state of Michigan. The population was 2,133 at the 2020 census.

The township consists of several sections surrounding and separated by the city of Hillsdale, but the township and city are administered autonomously.

== Communities ==
- Bankers is an unincorporated community located in the southern portion of the township on the border with Cambria Township at 41°53′52″N 84°41′29″W. The community was founded by Horace and George Banker in 1838 and was platted in 1869. In 1871, a railway line of the Detroit, Hillsdale & Indiana Railroad was built through the area, in which Bankers was the southern terminus of a line that ran north to Ypsilanti. Bankers centered around a sawmill and was referred to as Bankers Station, and a post office operated here from January 30, 1872, until January 31, 1909.

== Geography ==
According to the U.S. Census Bureau, the township has a total area of 12.89 square miles (33.38 km^{2}), of which 12.32 square miles (31.91 km^{2}) is land and 0.57 square miles (1.48 km^{2}) (4.42%) is water.

=== Major highways ===
- M-99 run briefly through the southeast portion of the township after exiting the city of Hillsdale.

== Demographics ==
As of the census of 2000, there were 1,965 people, 734 households, and 593 families residing in the township. The population density was 155.5 inhabitants per square mile (60.0/km^{2}). There were 805 housing units at an average density of 63.7 per square mile (24.6/km^{2}). The racial makeup of the township was 97.81% White, 0.81% African American, 0.10% Native American, 0.41% Asian, 0.25% from other races, and 0.61% from two or more races. Hispanic or Latino of any race were 0.71% of the population.

There were 734 households, out of which 31.1% had children under the age of 18 living with them, 70.4% were married couples living together, 6.9% had a female householder with no husband present, and 19.1% were non-families. 14.9% of all households were made up of individuals, and 6.3% had someone living alone who was 65 years of age or older. The average household size was 2.65 and the average family size was 2.89.

In the township the population was spread out, with 24.4% under the age of 18, 6.1% from 18 to 24, 25.8% from 25 to 44, 29.4% from 45 to 64, and 14.5% who were 65 years of age or older. The median age was 42 years. For every 100 females, there were 95.9 males. For every 100 females age 18 and over, there were 98.4 males.

The median income for a household in the township was $50,357, and the median income for a family was $55,057. Males had a median income of $37,656 versus $22,727 for females. The per capita income for the township was $22,396. About 3.3% of families and 4.2% of the population were below the poverty line, including 6.0% of those under age 18 and none of those age 65 or over.

== Education ==
The majority of the township is served by Hillsdale Community Schools, while a very small portion of the northwest corner of the township is served by Jonesville Community Schools to the north in Jonesville.
