= Moses Allen (settler) =

American settler

Captain Moses Allen was the first settler in Hillsdale County, located in the south central portion of the U.S. State of Michigan.

Moses Allen was a veteran of the War of 1812; he later served as a captain in the Michigan Militia. He became the first "white settler" in present-day Hillsdale County. He settled in April 1827, two years after working on the Chicago Turnpike survey. (present-day US-12)
