= E. O. Grosvenor House =

Historic house in Michigan, United States

- U.S. National Register of Historic Places
- Michigan State Historic Site
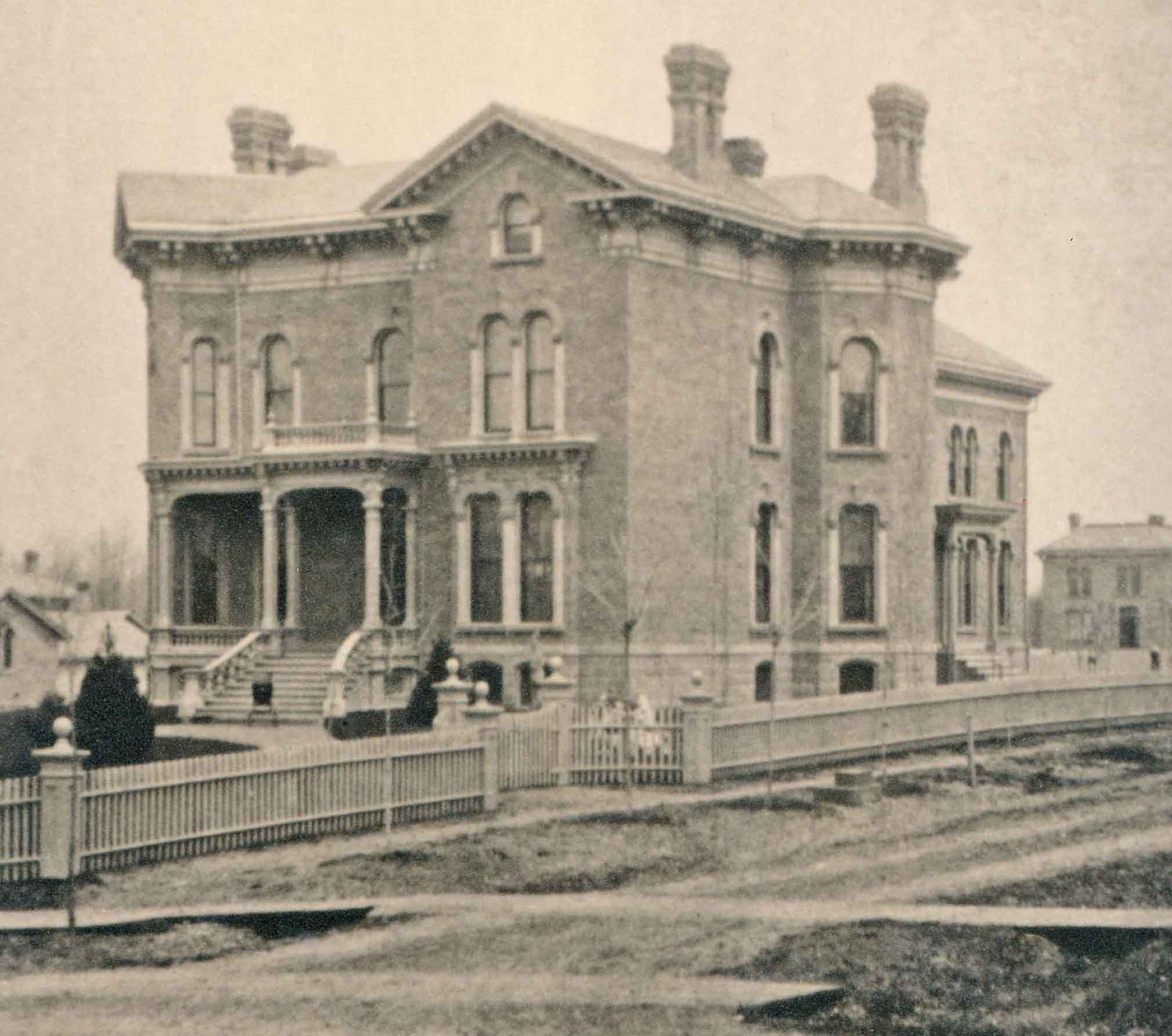
- Interactive map
- Location: 211 Maumee St., Jonesville, Michigan
- Coordinates: 41°58′55″N 84°39′35″W
- Area: 2.5 acres (1.0 ha)
- Built: 1874
- Architect: Elijah E. Myers
- Architectural style: Italianate
- NRHP reference No.: 77000713

Significant dates
- Added to NRHP: December 6, 1977
- Designated MSHS: April 15, 1977

The E. O. Grosvenor House, also known as the Gamble House, is located at 211 Maumee Street in Jonesville, Michigan. It was built as a private home for Ebenezer O. Grosvenor, and now operates as the Grosvenor House Museum. It was designated a Michigan State Historic Site and listed on the National Register of Historic Places in 1977. It is considered one of the most magnificent residences in Michigan.

== History ==
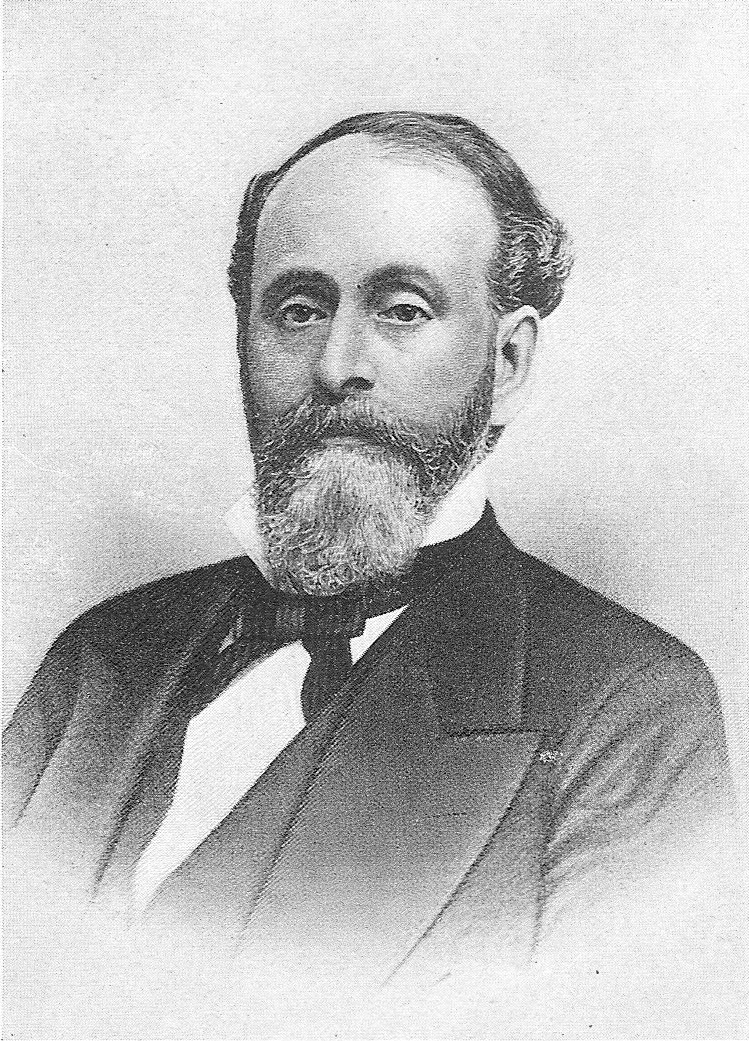
Ebenezer Oliver Grosvenor

Ebenezer O. Grosvenor was a politician who served in the Michigan Senate, one term as the Lieutenant Governor of Michigan, and two terms as the State Treasurer of Michigan. He arrived in Jonesville in 1840, establishing a store and a bank in the town. Grosvenor had this house constructed in 1874 from plans drawn by Elijah E. Myers. Ebenezer Grosvenor lived in this house until his death in 1910. After his death, four generations of Grosvenors lived in the house, after which it was turned into a rooming house.

In 1960, the house was purchased by the Gamble family, and in 1977 it was sold to the Jonesville Heritage Association. It now operates as the Grosvenor House Museum

== Description ==
The E. O. Grosvenor House is a rectangular red brick two-story Victorian Italianate house placed on a stone foundation. The perimeter contains multiple bays, columned porches, and other projecting elements. It is decorated with brackets, dentils, and a fielded panel frieze.

The interior contains thirty-two rooms, all with twelve-foot ceilings. There are eight Italian marble fireplaces, all differently colored, a grand staircase, and Egyptian-themed walnut window valances.
