= Jonesville, Michigan =

- City
- City of Jonesville
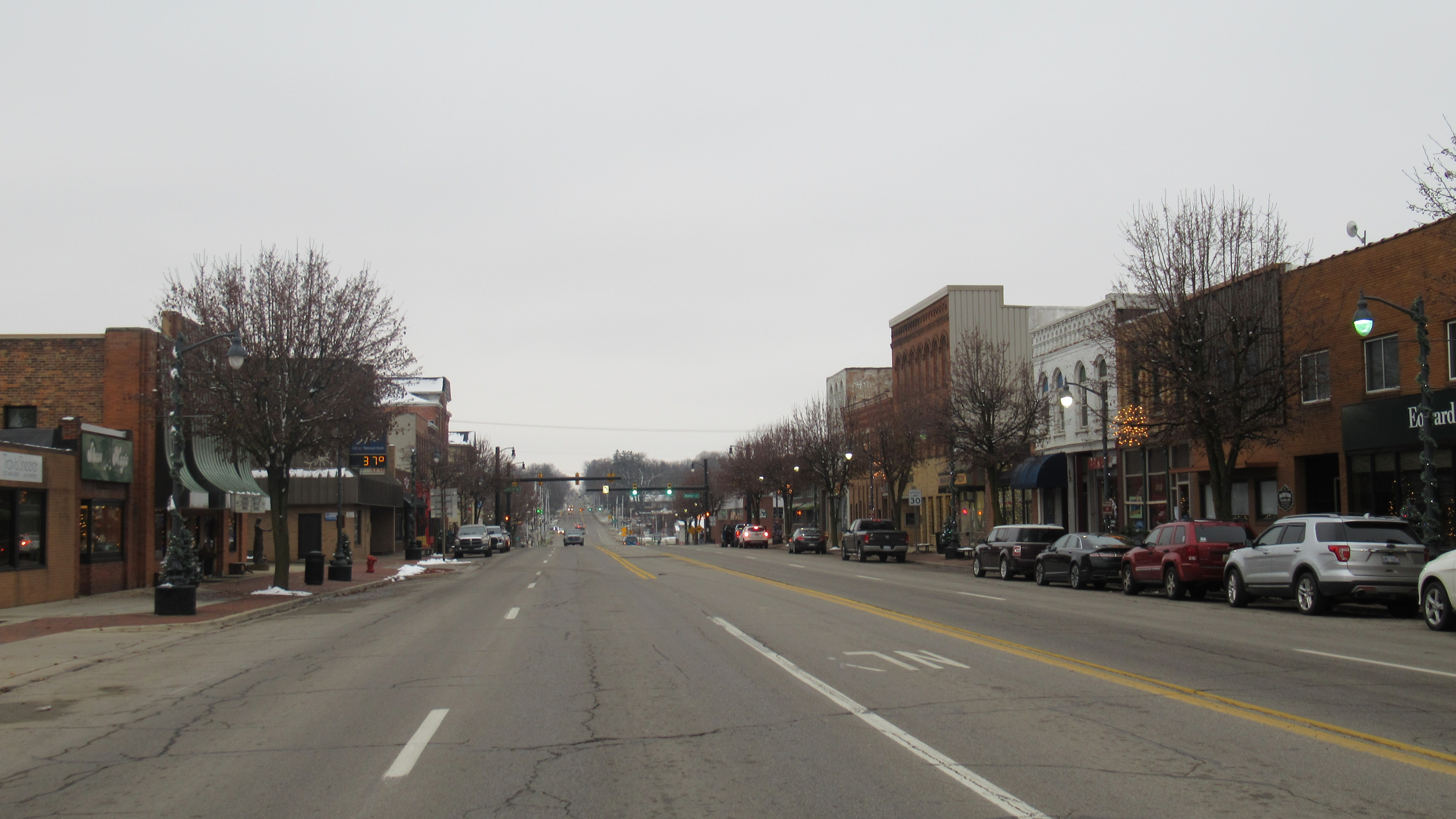
- Looking southwest along U.S. Route 12

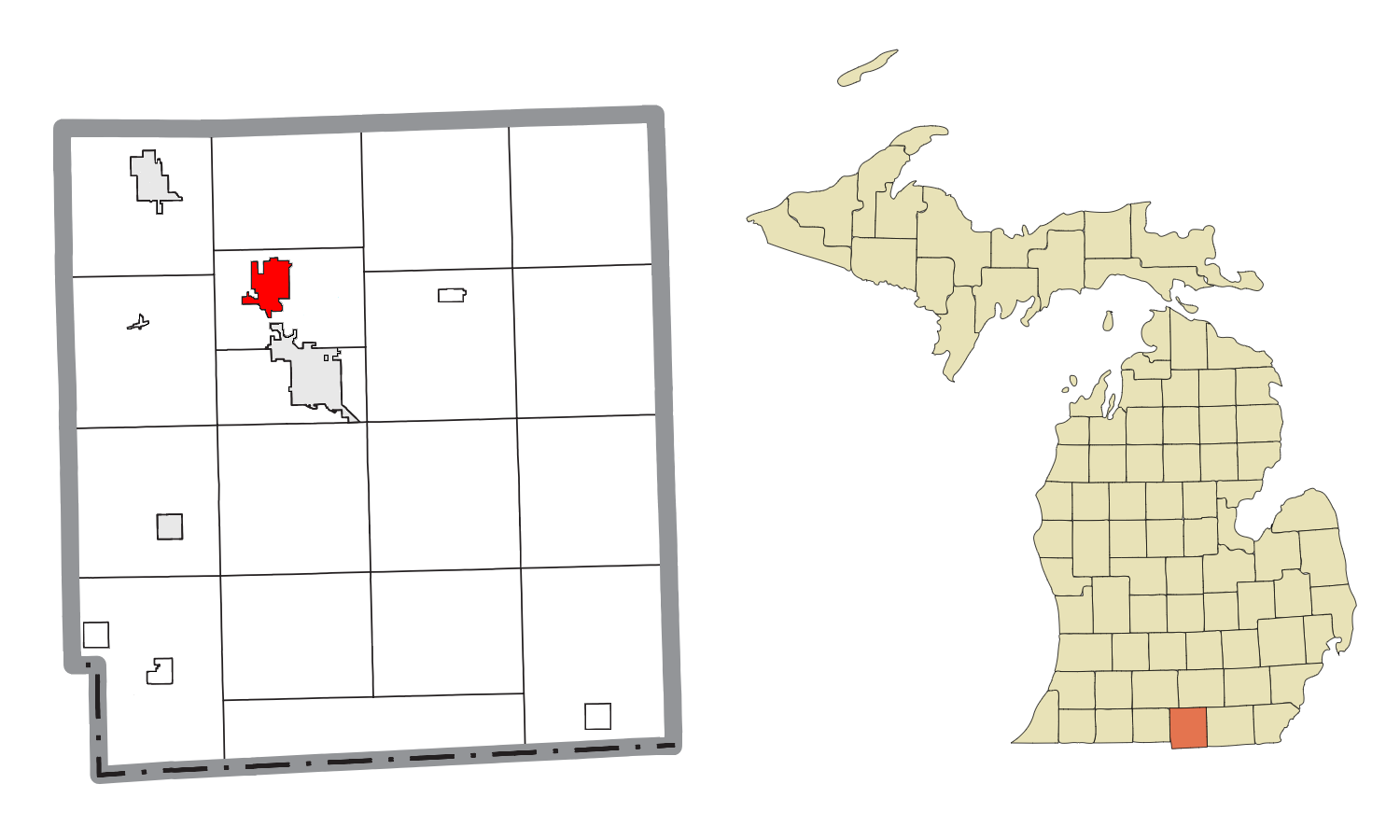
- Location within Hillsdale County

- Location within the state of Michigan Location within the United States
- Coordinates: 41°58′52″N 84°39′59″W
- Country: United States
- State: Michigan
- County: Hillsdale
- Founded: 1828
- Incorporated: 1855 (village); 2014 (city)

Government
  - Type: Council–manager
  - Mayor: Gerald Arno
  - Clerk: Cindy Means
  - Manager: Jeffrey Gray

Area
  - Total: 2.83 sq mi (7.33 km^{2})
  - Land: 2.79 sq mi (7.23 km^{2})
  - Water: 0.039 sq mi (0.10 km^{2})
- Elevation: 1,076 ft (328 m)

Population (2020)
  - Total: 2,176
  - Density: 887.46/sq mi (342.65/km^{2})
- Time zone: UTC-5 (Eastern (EST))
  - Summer (DST): UTC-4 (EDT)
- ZIP code(s): 49250
- Area code: 517
- FIPS code: 26-41920
- GNIS feature ID: 0629385
- Website: Official website

Jonesville is a city in Hillsdale County in the U.S. state of Michigan. The population was 2,176 at the 2020 census.

== History ==
The area was first settled by brothers Benaiah and Edmund Jones, who came here from Painesville, Ohio in 1828 and purchased land the next year. They surveyed and platted the community by 1831. It served as the first county seat of Hillsdale County, which was formally organized in 1835. The Jonesville post office opened on January 21, 1841. The community incorporated as a village in 1855. Jonesville once contained a railway station along the Lake Shore and Michigan Southern Railway.

In August 2014, the village voted to adopt a charter and incorporated as a city.

The city contains three listings on the National Register of Historic Places: J.J. Deal and Son Carriage Factory, Grace Episcopal Church, and the E.O. Grosvenor House. All three of these are also Michigan State Historic Sites, and the city also includes the state historic sites the Delevan (Munro) House and Kiddie Brush and Toy Company. The toy company occupied the same building as the Carriage Factory, which is now renovated as an apartment complex.

== Geography ==
According to the U.S. Census Bureau, the village has a total area of 2.83 square miles (7.33 km^{2}), of which 2.79 square miles (7.23 km^{2}) is land and 0.04 square miles (0.10 km^{2}) (0.99%) is water.

The St. Joseph River flows through the city.

=== Major highways ===
- US 12 (W. Chicago Street) runs southwest through the center of the city.
- M-99 runs south–north through the city and also runs concurrently with US 12 for a short distance.

== Demographics ==
Historical population
Census	Pop.	Note	%±
1850	565		—
1860	1,008		78.4%
1880	1,445		—
1890	1,288		−10.9%
1900	1,307		1.5%
1910	1,396		6.8%
1920	1,274		−8.7%
1930	1,316		3.3%
1940	1,302		−1.1%
1950	1,594		22.4%
1960	1,896		18.9%
1970	2,081		9.8%
1980	2,172		4.4%
1990	2,283		5.1%
2000	2,337		2.4%
2010	2,258		−3.4%
2020	2,176		−3.6%
U.S. Decennial Census

=== 2020 census ===
As of the 2020 census, Jonesville had a population of 2,176. The median age was 41.6 years. 22.9% of residents were under the age of 18 and 21.6% of residents were 65 years of age or older. For every 100 females there were 90.7 males, and for every 100 females age 18 and over there were 91.6 males age 18 and over.

95.9% of residents lived in urban areas, while 4.1% lived in rural areas.

There were 949 households in Jonesville, of which 28.8% had children under the age of 18 living in them. Of all households, 39.5% were married-couple households, 20.4% were households with a male householder and no spouse or partner present, and 32.6% were households with a female householder and no spouse or partner present. About 35.8% of all households were made up of individuals and 19.0% had someone living alone who was 65 years of age or older.

There were 1,018 housing units, of which 6.8% were vacant. The homeowner vacancy rate was 1.2% and the rental vacancy rate was 4.4%.

Racial composition as of the 2020 census
Race	Number	Percent
White	2,017	92.7%
Black or African American	7	0.3%
American Indian and Alaska Native	13	0.6%
Asian	14	0.6%
Native Hawaiian and Other Pacific Islander	0	0.0%
Some other race	14	0.6%
Two or more races	111	5.1%
Hispanic or Latino (of any race)	55	2.5%

=== 2010 census ===
As of the census of 2010, there were 2,258 people, 894 households, and 596 families living in the village. The population density was 781.3 inhabitants per square mile (301.7/km^{2}). There were 983 housing units at an average density of 340.1 per square mile (131.3/km^{2}). The racial makeup of the village was 95.3% White, 2.1% African American, 0.3% Native American, 0.9% Asian, 0.3% from other races, and 1.1% from two or more races. Hispanic or Latino of any race were 2.1% of the population.

There were 894 households, of which 30.1% had children under the age of 18 living with them, 48.2% were married couples living together, 13.4% had a female householder with no husband present, 5.0% had a male householder with no wife present, and 33.3% were non-families. 29.1% of all households were made up of individuals, and 14.8% had someone living alone who was 65 years of age or older. The average household size was 2.41 and the average family size was 2.95.

The median age in the village was 37.6 years. 26.3% of residents were under the age of 18; 9.2% were between the ages of 18 and 24; 23.3% were from 25 to 44; 23.8% were from 45 to 64; and 17.4% were 65 years of age or older. The gender makeup of the village was 47.4% male and 52.6% female.

=== 2000 census ===
As of the census of 2000, there were 2,337 people, 926 households, and 623 families living in the village. The population density was 856.7 inhabitants per square mile (330.8/km^{2}). There were 975 housing units at an average density of 357.4 per square mile (138.0/km^{2}). The racial makeup of the village was 96.02% White, 1.93% African American, 0.26% Native American, 0.21% Asian, 0.39% from other races, and 1.20% from two or more races. Hispanic or Latino of any race were 1.80% of the population.

There were 926 households, out of which 31.0% had children under the age of 18 living with them, 54.1% were married couples living together, 10.0% had a female householder with no husband present, and 32.7% were non-families. 28.9% of all households were made up of individuals, and 13.2% had someone living alone who was 65 years of age or older. The average household size was 2.39 and the average family size was 2.92.

In the village, the population was spread out, with 27.9% under the age of 18, 8.0% from 18 to 24, 26.4% from 25 to 44, 22.4% from 45 to 64, and 15.2% who were 65 years of age or older. The median age was 36 years. For every 100 females, there were 102.0 males. For every 100 females age 18 and over, there were 93.8 males.

The median income for a household in the village was $35,223, and the median income for a family was $41,813. Males had a median income of $34,135 versus $23,333 for females. The per capita income for the village was $15,877. About 6.5% of families and 9.9% of the population were below the poverty line, including 9.5% of those under age 18 and 5.8% of those age 65 or over.

== Education ==
The city is served entirely by its own school district, Jonesville Community Schools, which also serves large areas of several neighboring townships.

== Images ==
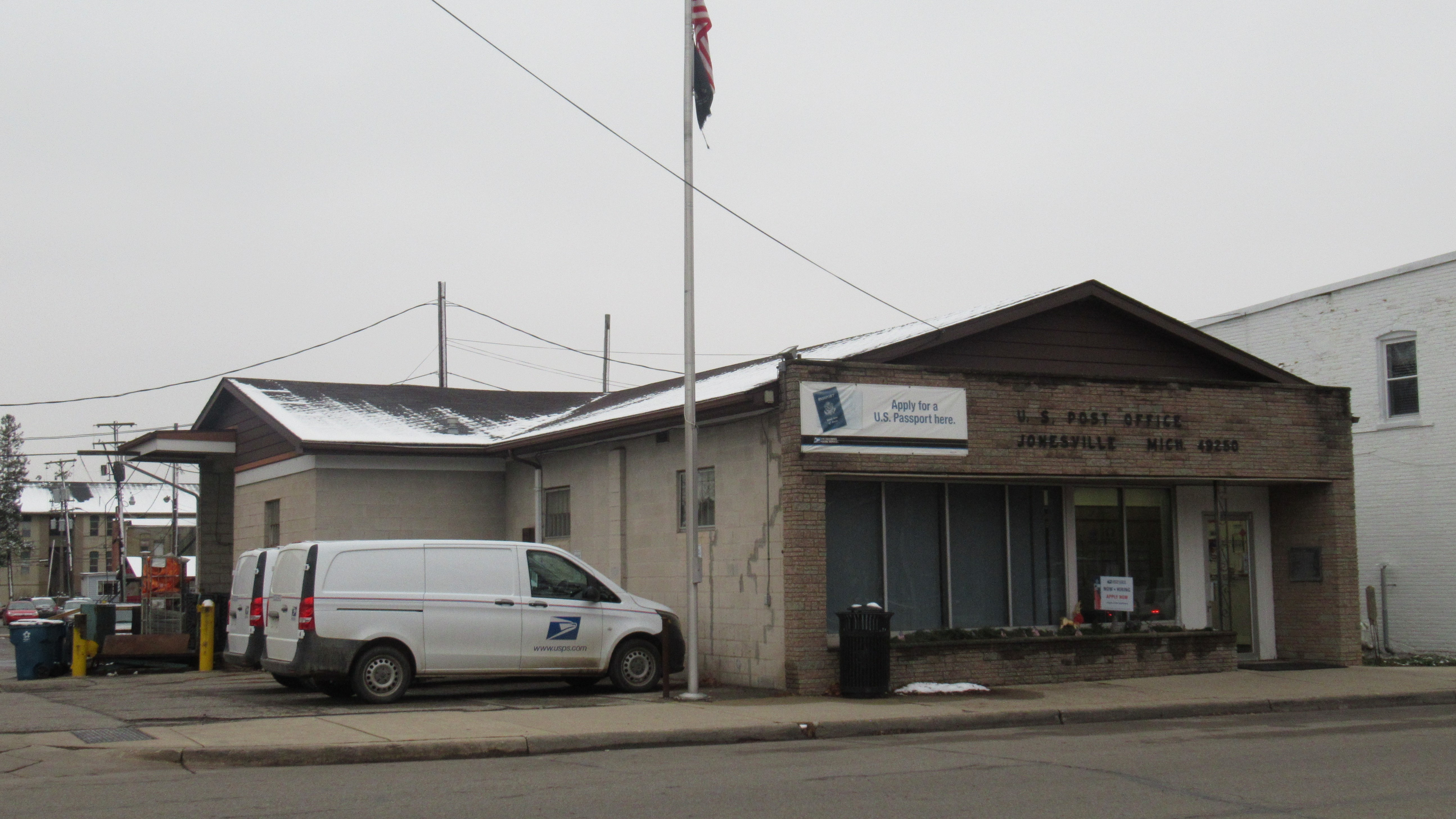
U.S. Post Office in Jonesville

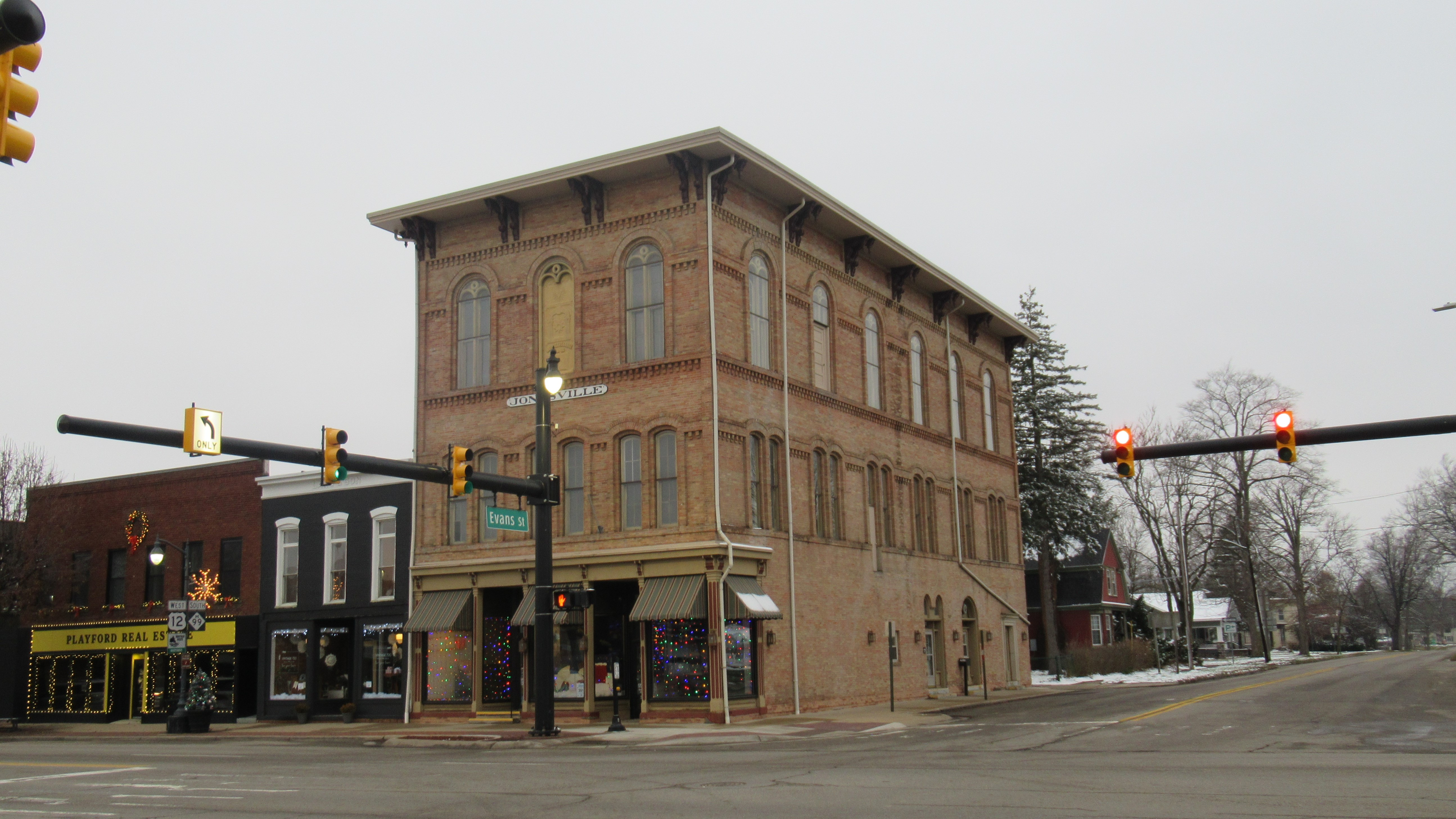
Jonesville City Hall

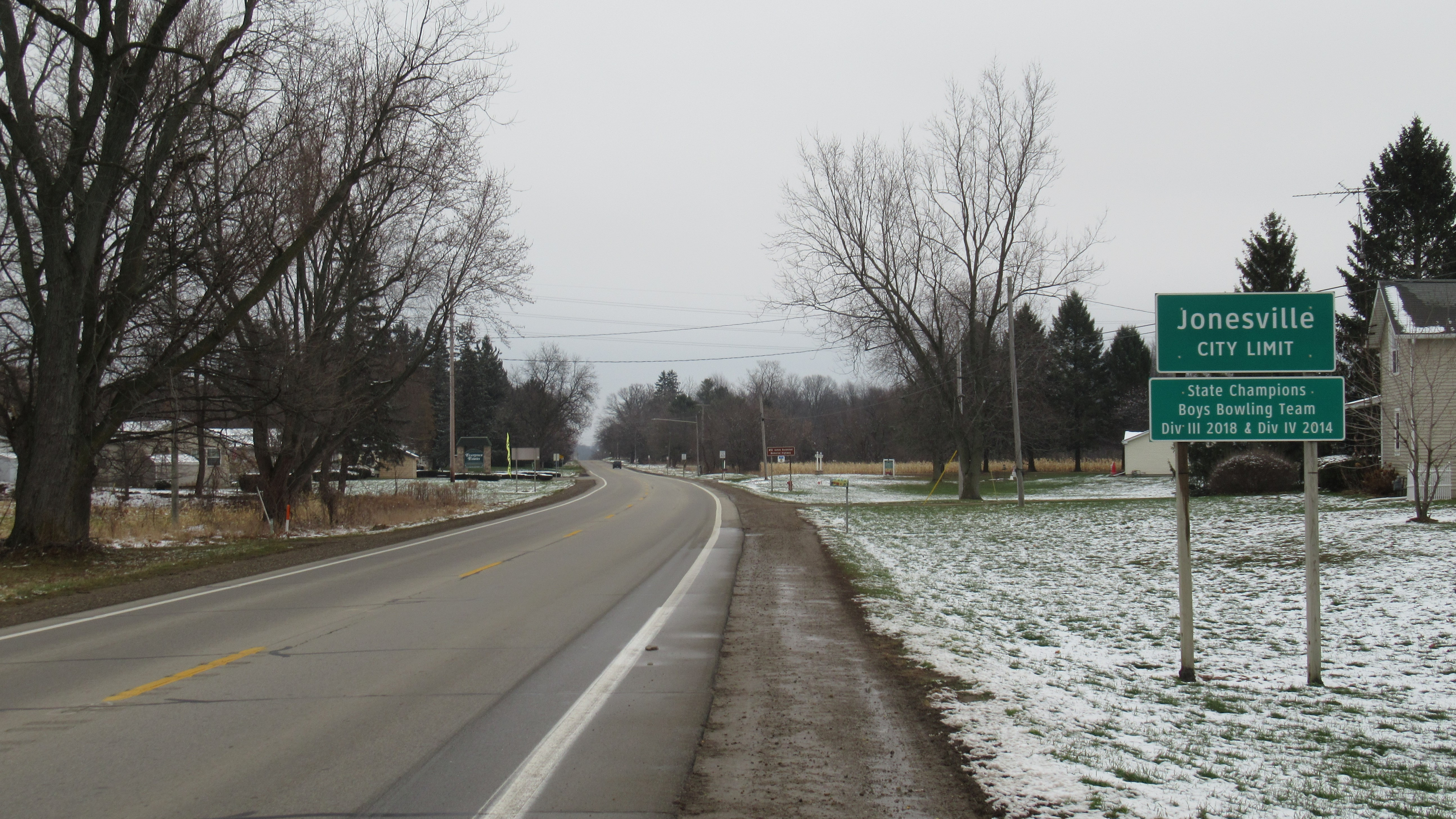
Signage along eastbound US 12

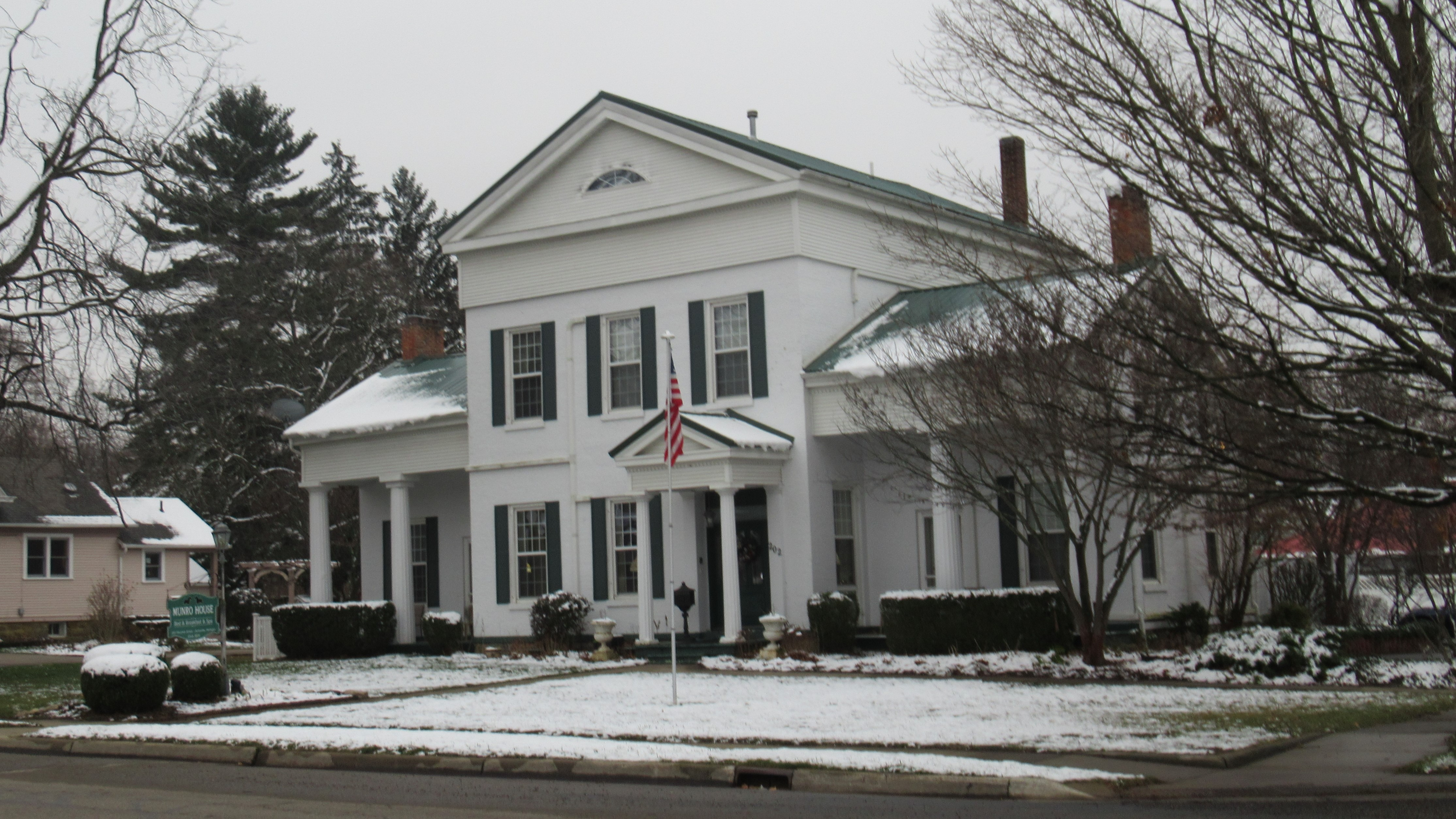
Munro House (built around 1834)
