= Litchfield Township, Michigan =

- Civil township
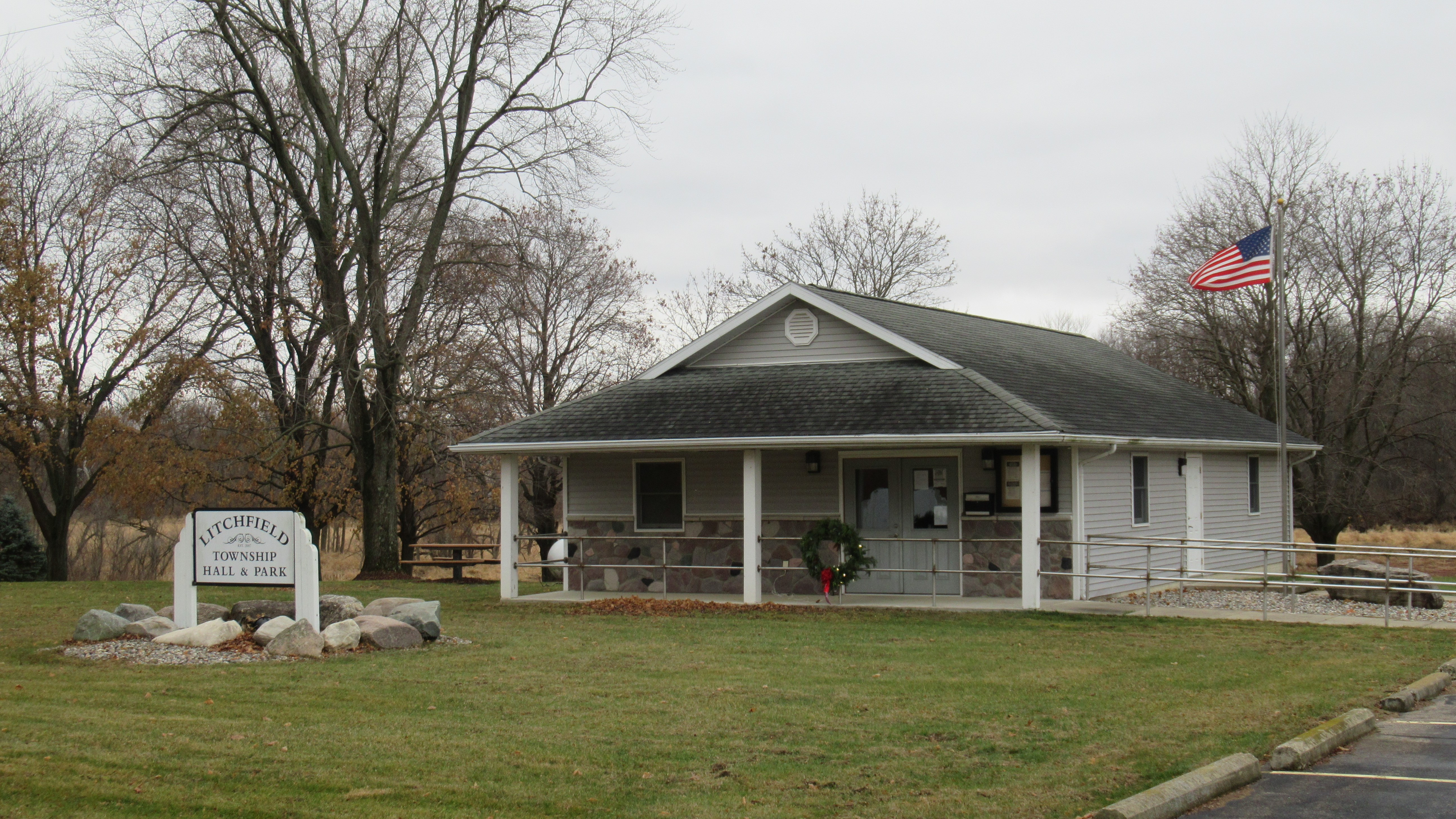
- Litchfield Township Hall

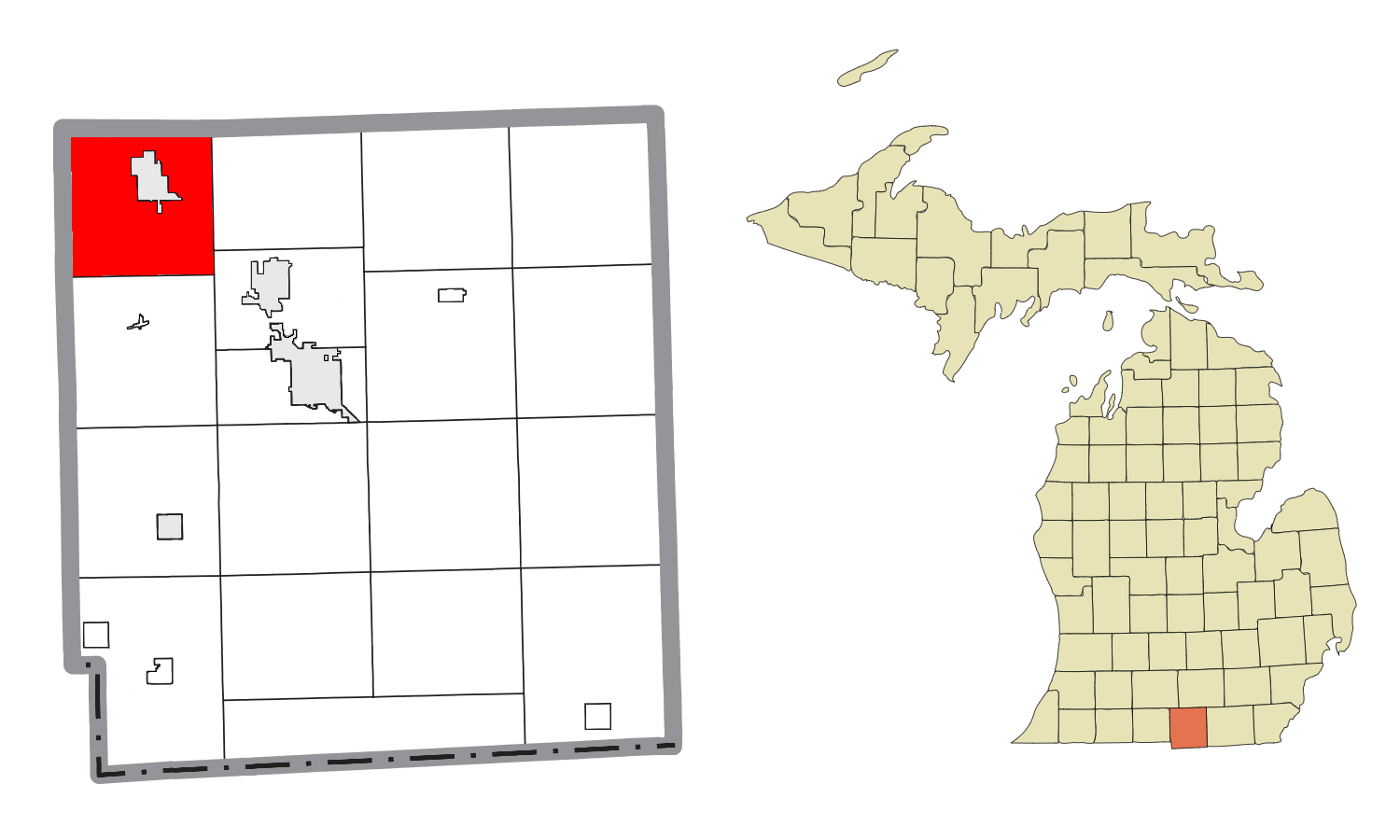
- Location within Hillsdale County

- Location within the state of Michigan Litchfield Township (the United States)
- Coordinates: 42°01′37″N 84°46′06″W
- Country: United States
- State: Michigan
- County: Hillsdale
- Established: 1837

Government
  - Supervisor: Tamara Dow
  - Clerk: Vicki Heckel

Area
  - Total: 33.05 sq mi (85.60 km^{2})
  - Land: 32.97 sq mi (85.39 km^{2})
  - Water: 0.081 sq mi (0.21 km^{2})
- Elevation: 1,050 ft (320 m)

Population (2020)
  - Total: 1,029
  - Density: 31.2/sq mi (12.0/km^{2})
- Time zone: UTC-5 (Eastern (EST))
  - Summer (DST): UTC-4 (EDT)
- ZIP code(s): 49227 (Allen); 49252 (Litchfield)
- Area code: 517
- FIPS code: 26-48000
- GNIS feature ID: 1626629

Litchfield Township is a civil township of Hillsdale County in the U.S. state of Michigan. The population was 1,029 at the 2020 census.

The city of Litchfield is surrounded by the township, but the two are administered autonomously since Litchfield incorporated as a city in 1970.

== Geography ==
According to the U.S. Census Bureau, the township has a total area of 33.05 square miles (85.60 km^{2}), of which 32.97 square miles (85.39 km^{2}) is land and 0.08 square miles (0.21 km^{2}) (0.24%) is water.

The St. Joseph River flows through the township, and the North Country Trail also travels through the township.

=== Major highways ===
- M-49 enters the township from the south and has its northern terminus in the city of Litchfield.
- M-99 runs through the northeast portion of the township through the city of Litchfield.

== Demographics ==
As of the census of 2000, there were 969 people, 357 households, and 285 families residing in the township. The population density was 29.3 inhabitants per square mile (11.3/km^{2}). There were 382 housing units at an average density of 11.5 per square mile (4.4/km^{2}). The racial makeup of the township was 97.01% White, 0.41% African American, 0.62% Native American, 0.21% Asian, 0.52% from other races, and 1.24% from two or more races. Hispanic or Latino of any race were 1.55% of the population.

There were 357 households, out of which 28.0% had children under the age of 18 living with them, 70.3% were married couples living together, 5.9% had a female householder with no husband present, and 19.9% were non-families. 16.5% of all households were made up of individuals, and 5.9% had someone living alone who was 65 years of age or older. The average household size was 2.69 and the average family size was 2.94.

In the township the population was spread out, with 22.8% under the age of 18, 7.5% from 18 to 24, 26.1% from 25 to 44, 28.8% from 45 to 64, and 14.8% who were 65 years of age or older. The median age was 41 years. For every 100 females, there were 111.6 males. For every 100 females age 18 and over, there were 111.3 males.

The median income for a household in the township was $42,153, and the median income for a family was $45,385. Males had a median income of $36,083 versus $22,500 for females. The per capita income for the township was $17,625. About 5.8% of families and 9.5% of the population were below the poverty line, including 10.2% of those under age 18 and 10.1% of those age 65 or over.

== Education ==
The township is served by four separate public school districts. The vast majority of the township is served by Litchfield Community Schools. The southeast corner of the township is served by Jonesville Community Schools in Jonesville. A small portion of the northwest corner of the township is served by Homer Community Schools to the northwest in Calhoun County. A very small portion of the southwest corner of the township is served by the Quincy Community School District to the west in Branch County.
