= Scipio Township, Michigan =

- Civil township
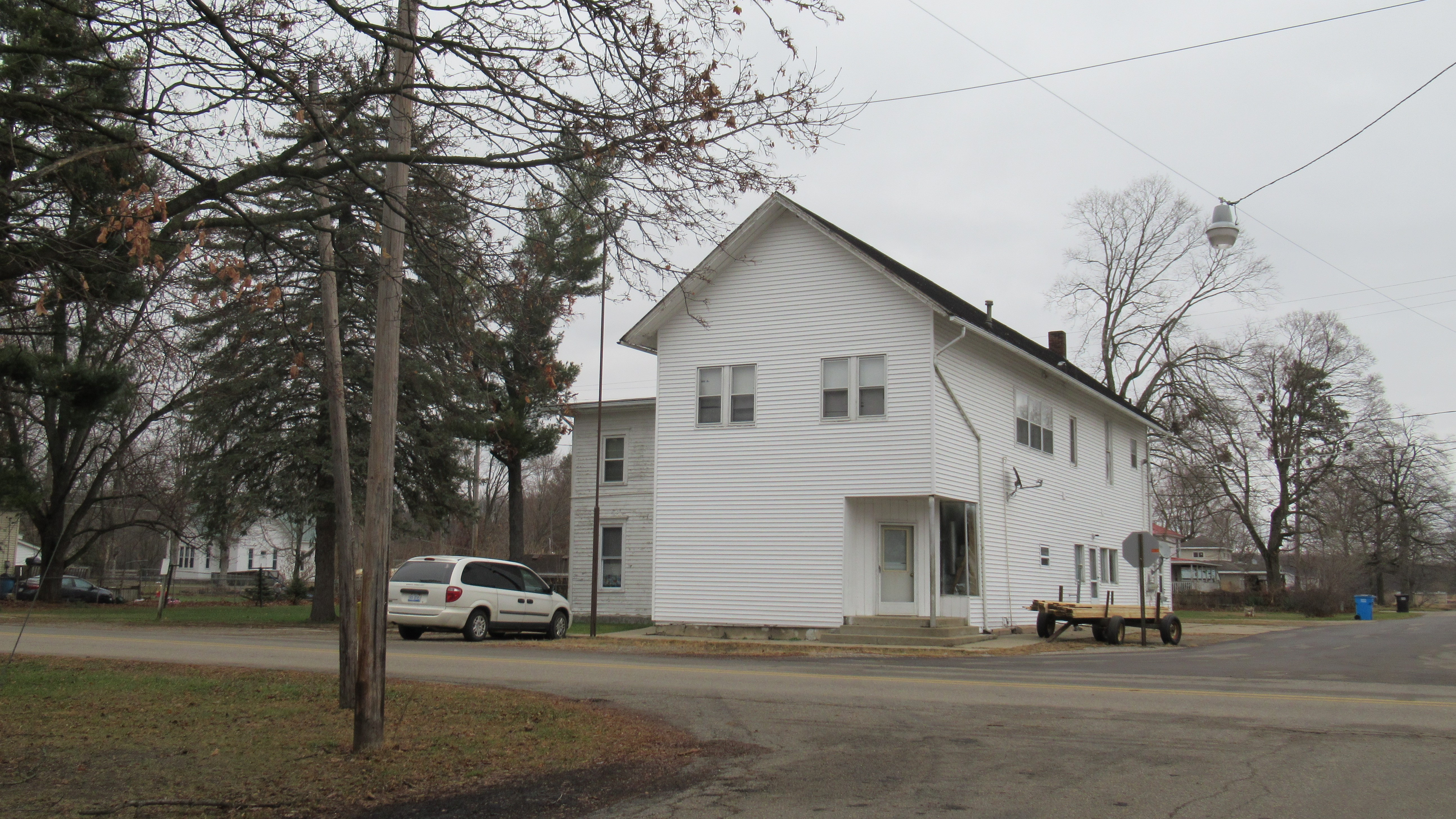
- Former township hall in Mosherville

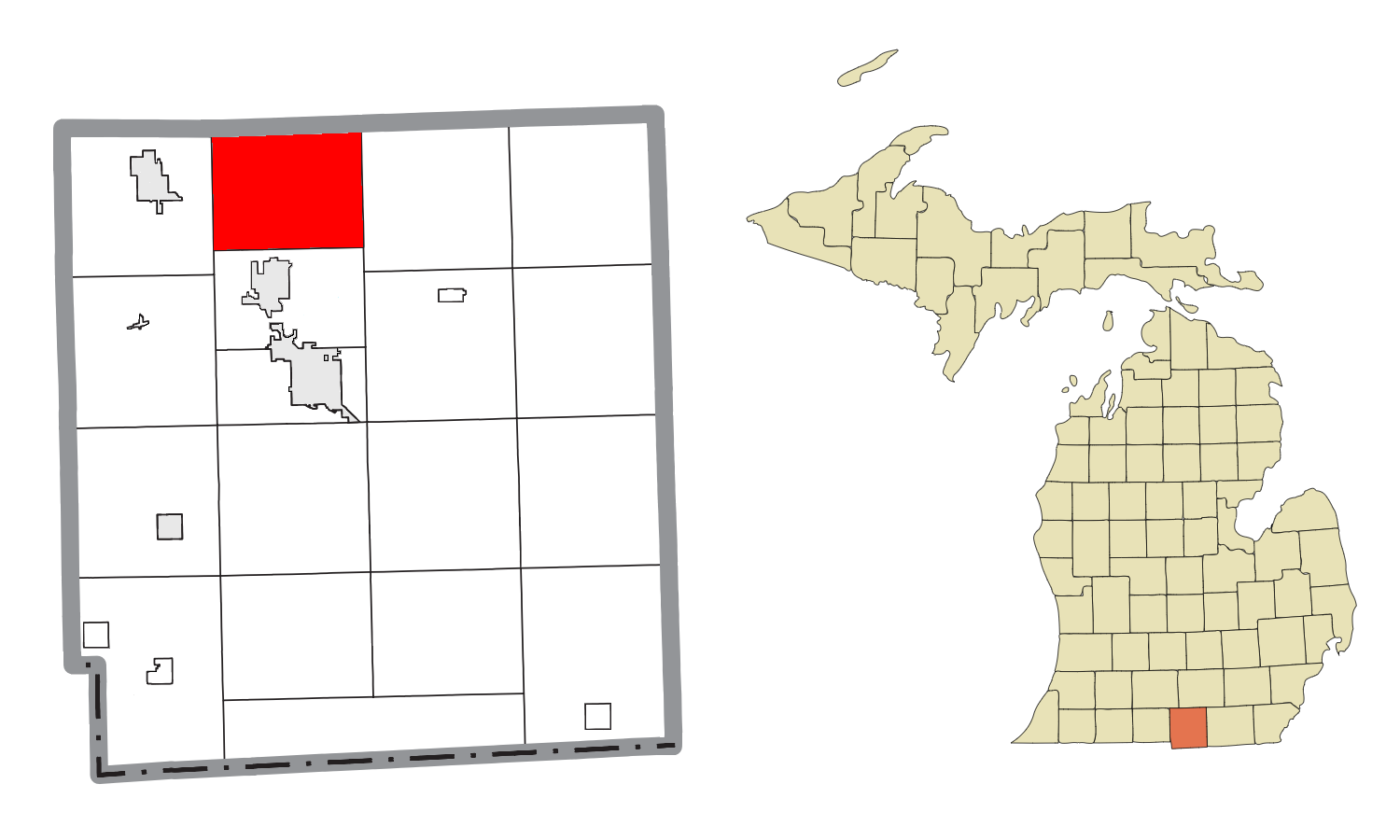
- Location within Hillsdale County

- Location within the state of Michigan Location within the United States
- Coordinates: 42°02′11″N 84°39′40″W
- Country: United States
- State: Michigan
- County: Hillsdale
- Established: 1836

Government
  - Clerk: Judy Leedy

Area
  - Total: 29.45 sq mi (76.28 km^{2})
  - Land: 29.21 sq mi (75.65 km^{2})
  - Water: 0.24 sq mi (0.62 km^{2})
- Elevation: 1,070 ft (326 m)

Population (2020)
  - Total: 1,902
  - Density: 65.1/sq mi (25.1/km^{2})
- Time zone: UTC-5 (Eastern (EST))
  - Summer (DST): UTC-4 (EDT)
- ZIP code(s): 49250 (Jonesville); 49252 (Litchfield); 49258 (Mosherville)
- Area code: 517
- FIPS code: 26-71980
- GNIS feature ID: 1627052
- Website: Official website

Scipio Township (/sɪˈpiːoʊ/ sip-EE-oh) is a civil township of Hillsdale County in the U.S. state of Michigan. The population was 1,902 at the 2020 census.

== Communities ==
- East Mosherville is a former settlement within the township just east of the community of Mosherville. The community had a station along the former railway line belonging to the Fort Wayne and Jackson Railroad branch of the New York Central Railroad. While the community no longer exists, it can be seen on the 1872 and 1916 maps of Scipio Township.
- Mosherville is an unincorporated community within the township at 42°03′37″N 84°39′34″W.

== Geography ==
According to the U.S. Census Bureau, the township has a total area of 29.45 square miles (76.28 km^{2}), of which 29.21 square miles (75.65 km^{2}) is land and 0.24 square miles (0.62 km^{2}) (0.81%) is water.

=== Major highways ===
- US 12 (E. Chicago Road) enters briefly in the southeast corner of the township.
- M-99 (Homer Road) enters briefly in the southwest corner of the township.

== Demographics ==
As of the census of 2000, there were 1,822 people, 619 households, and 487 families residing in the township. The population density was 62.1 inhabitants per square mile (24.0/km^{2}). There were 660 housing units at an average density of 22.5 per square mile (8.7/km^{2}). The racial makeup of the township was 97.37% White, 0.22% African American, 0.77% Native American, 0.55% Asian, 0.22% from other races, and 0.88% from two or more races. Hispanic or Latino of any race were 0.55% of the population.

There were 619 households, out of which 37.5% had children under the age of 18 living with them, 64.8% were married couples living together, 9.5% had a female householder with no husband present, and 21.2% were non-families. 16.8% of all households were made up of individuals, and 5.0% had someone living alone who was 65 years of age or older. The average household size was 2.93 and the average family size was 3.26.

In the township the population was spread out, with 30.6% under the age of 18, 8.3% from 18 to 24, 28.3% from 25 to 44, 23.5% from 45 to 64, and 9.2% who were 65 years of age or older. The median age was 34 years. For every 100 females, there were 101.1 males. For every 100 females age 18 and over, there were 99.4 males.

The median income for a household in the township was $42,361, and the median income for a family was $47,065. Males had a median income of $32,008 versus $23,850 for females. The per capita income for the township was $17,427. About 6.3% of families and 8.6% of the population were below the poverty line, including 9.9% of those under age 18 and 15.3% of those age 65 or over.

== Education ==
The township is served by two separate public school district. The majority of the township is served by Jonesville Community Schools to the south in Jonesville. A small portion of the northwest corner of the township is served by Litchfield Community Schools to the west in Litchfield.
