= Mosherville, Michigan =

- Unincorporated community
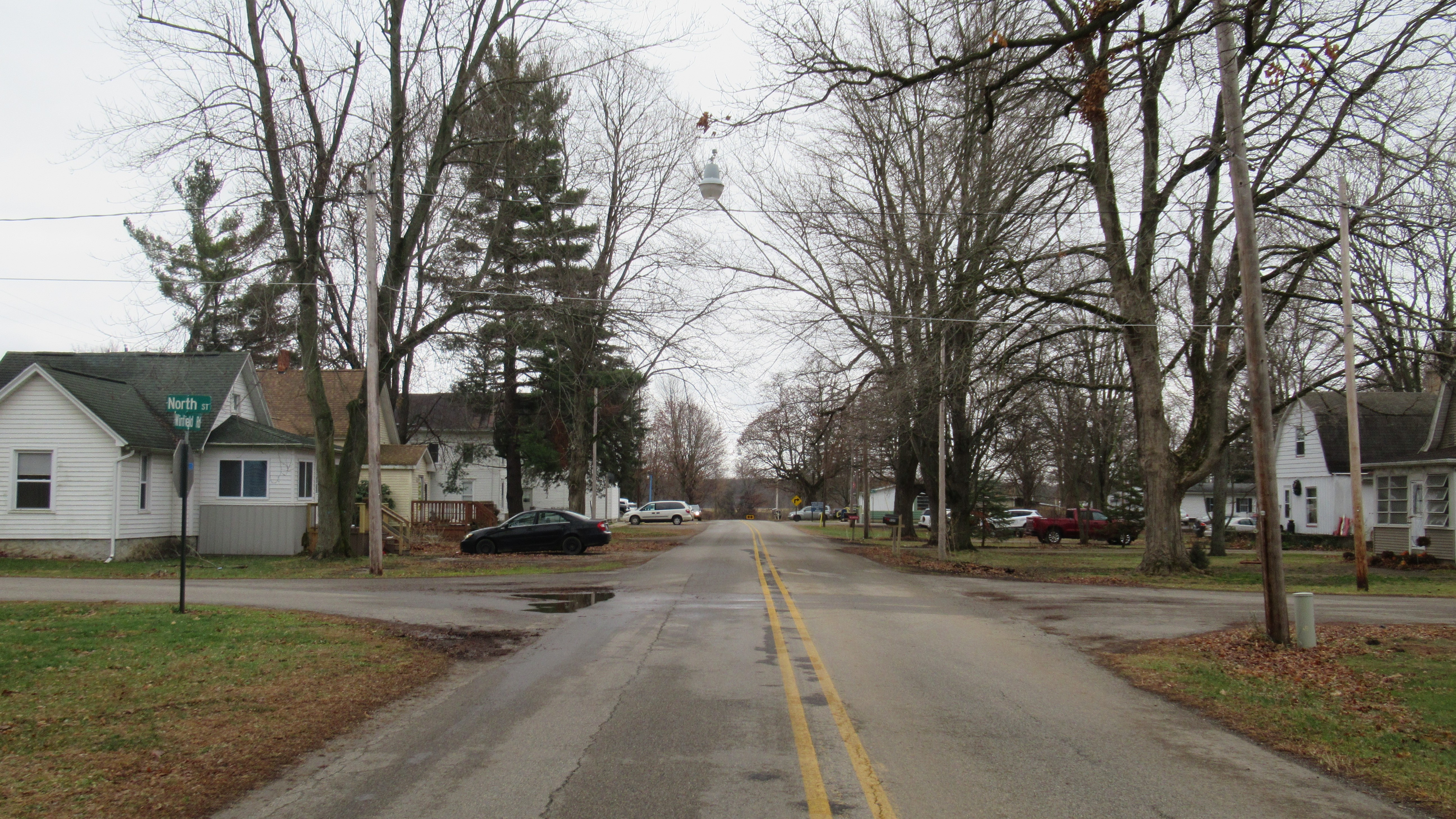
- Intersection of Winfield Road and North Street

- Location within the state of Michigan Location within the United States
- Coordinates: 42°03′37″N 84°39′34″W
- Country: United States
- State: Michigan
- County: Hillsdale
- Township: Scipio
- Settled: 1838
- Platted: 1852
- Elevation: 850 ft (260 m)
- Time zone: UTC-5 (Eastern (EST))
  - Summer (DST): UTC-4 (EDT)
- ZIP code(s): 49250 (Jonesville); 49258
- Area code: 517
- GNIS feature ID: 632744

Mosherville is an unincorporated community in Hillsdale County in the U.S. state of Michigan. The community is located within Scipio Township.

As an unincorporated community, Mosherville has no legally defined boundaries or population statistics of its own but does have its own post office with the 49258 ZIP Code, which is primarily used for post office box services.

== Geography ==
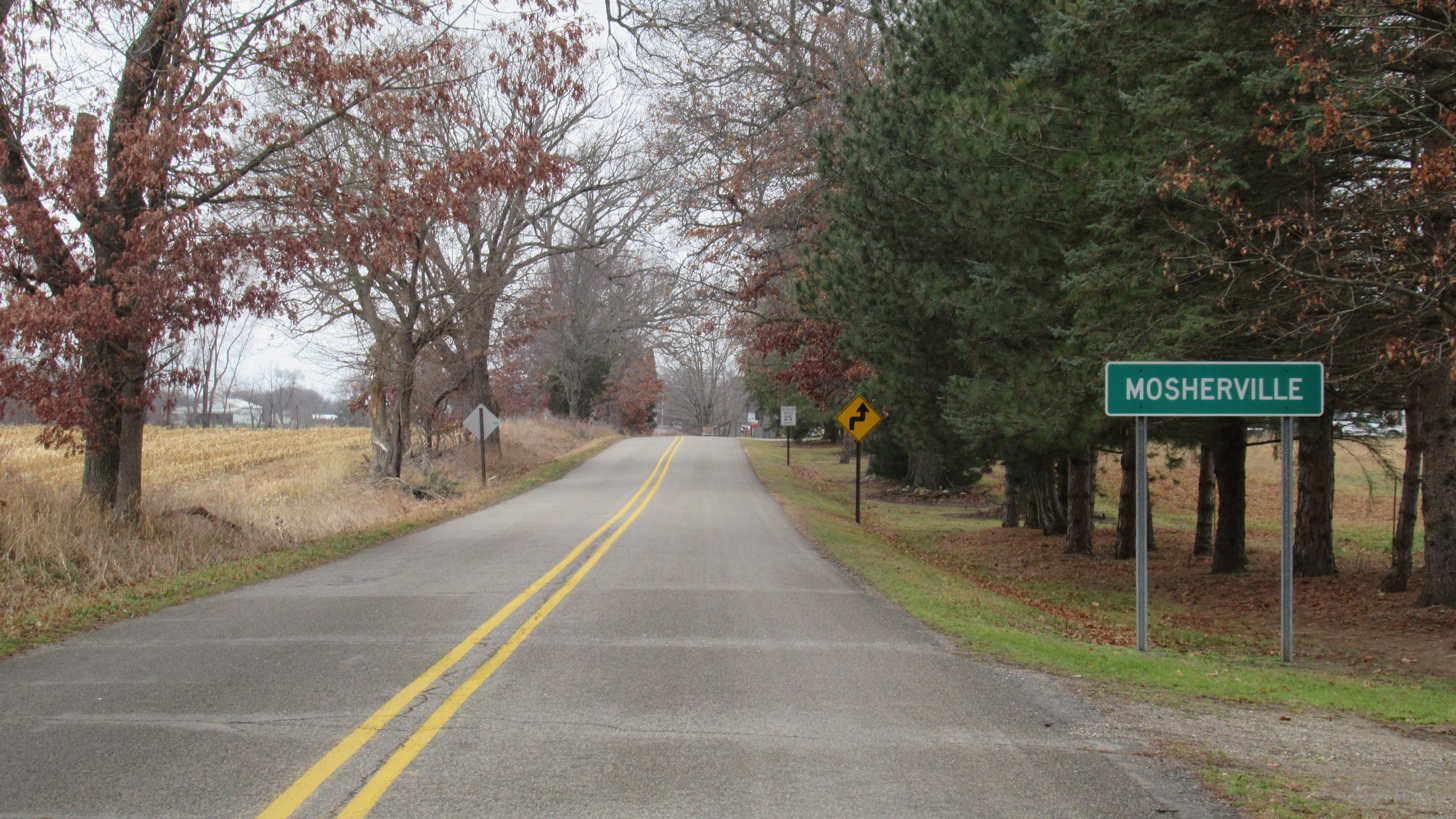
Signage along W. Mosherville Road

Mosherville is located in northern Scipio Township in north-central Hillsdale County about 25 miles (40 km) southeast of Coldwater.

Mosherville is located about 0.5 miles (0.8 km) south of the county line with Jackson County. The rural community is not served by any major highways or airports. Nearby cities include Litchfield to the west and Jonesville to the south. The village of Hanover is located to the northeast. Other nearby unincorporated communities include Pulaski to the north, Stoney Point to the northeast, and Moscow to the east.

Mosherville Lake is the largest lake within the community, and there are several smaller unnamed lakes nearby. The south branch of the Kalamazoo River flows directly through the community. The new Scipio Township Hall is located within Mosherville at 11180 Concord Road just east of the center of the community. The community is served by Jonesville Community Schools to the south in the city of Jonesville.

The Mosherville post office is located at 11200 Winfield Road in the center of the community. The post office uses the 49258 ZIP Code, which is primarily used for post office box services. For delivery, the surrounded area is served by the Jonesville post office, which uses the 49250 ZIP Code.

== History ==
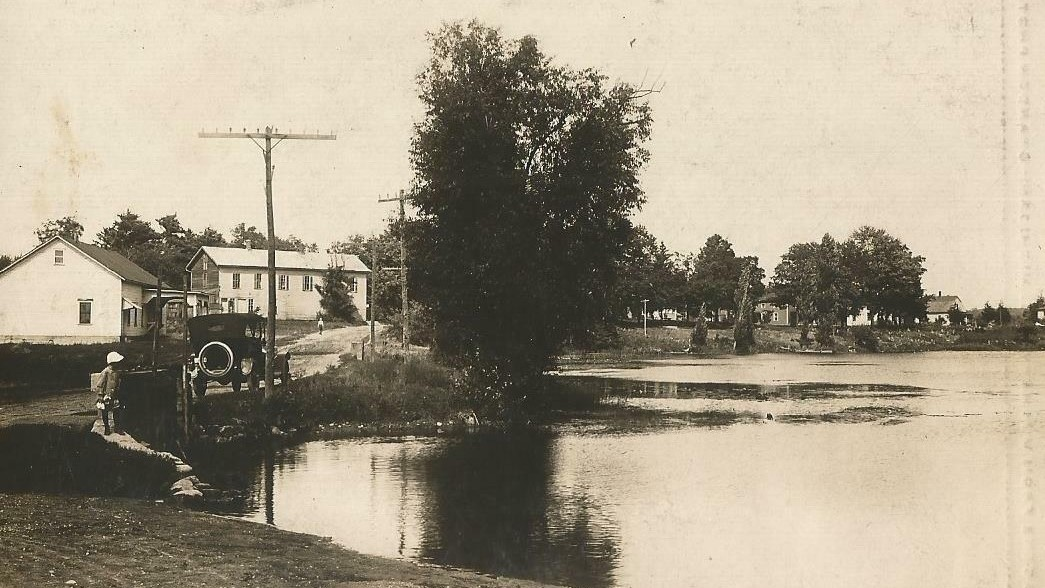
Historic image of Mosherville in 1914

This northern area of Scipio Township was first settled as early as 1838 by New York native David Mosher. His brothers Charles, James, and Giles would also later move to the area. David returned to New York, while his brothers remained and built a sawmill and grist mill. A post office first opened on July 2, 1849 and was named Scipio after the township. Samuel E. Smith served as the first postmaster. The community was platted in 1852 and later expanded in 1856, and the post office was briefly renamed Tylerville. The community appeared under the name Mosherville on an 1857 map of Hillsdale County, and the post office was ultimately renamed Mosherville on April 20, 1858.

In 1899, the Omega Portland Cement Company began operating in Mosherville along Cobb Lake, which is located just southeast of the community. The numerous small lakes in the area were rich in sediments necessary to produce Portland cement, and the company built several buildings in Mosherville. The sediments were dredged from the nearby lakes and transported to Millbury, Ohio for further processing. This company ceased operation in 1914.

Mosherville once had a train station along the Fort Wayne and Jackson Railroad branch of the New York Central Railroad. The station operated as late as 1923, but the station and train tracks are no longer present in Mosherville. East Mosherville was another community settled just to the east and also had its own train station. This community appeared on an 1872 and 1911 maps of Hillsdale County. While Mosherville continues to exist as an unincorporated community, East Mosherville has effectively become a ghost town.

=== Mosherville Church and School Complex ===
The most notable historic structures within the community are the Mosherville Church and Mosherville School. They were designated a Michigan State Historic Site as the Mosherville Church and School Complex on April 24, 1979. The next year, the state erected a dual-sized historic marker describing the two structures.

The church is located at 1520 North Street and was originally constructed from 1861–1862 on land donated by Joseph and Mary Riggs. The church was a Litchfield branch that served as a Methodist Episcopal Church, and it began operating independently in 1870. In 1891, the church was also used by the Ladies' Aid Society, which expanded the church. The Mosherville Church remains in operation and holds weekly non-denominational services.

The Mosherville School began operating in 1847 and built its first school in 1857–1858. In 1872, the current structure was built next to the church at a cost of $2,800. As the oldest school in Scipio Township, it served as a two-room schoolhouse that taught students in grades one through ten. Later serving as only an eighth grade school, it closed in 1967. Afterward, it was used by the Ladies' Aid Society and currently serves as a fellowship hall with the Mosherville Church.

== Images ==
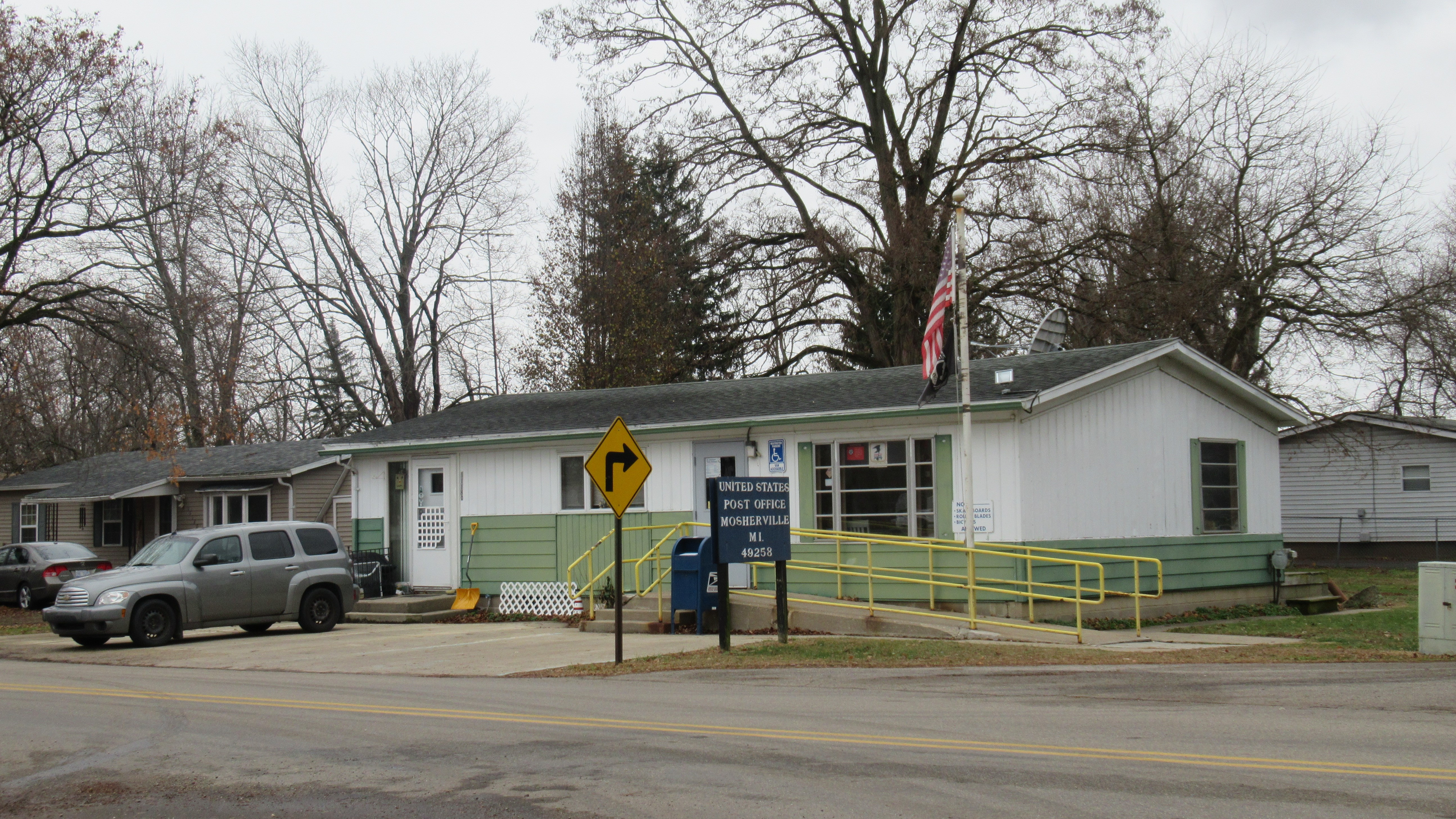
U.S. Post Office in Mosherville

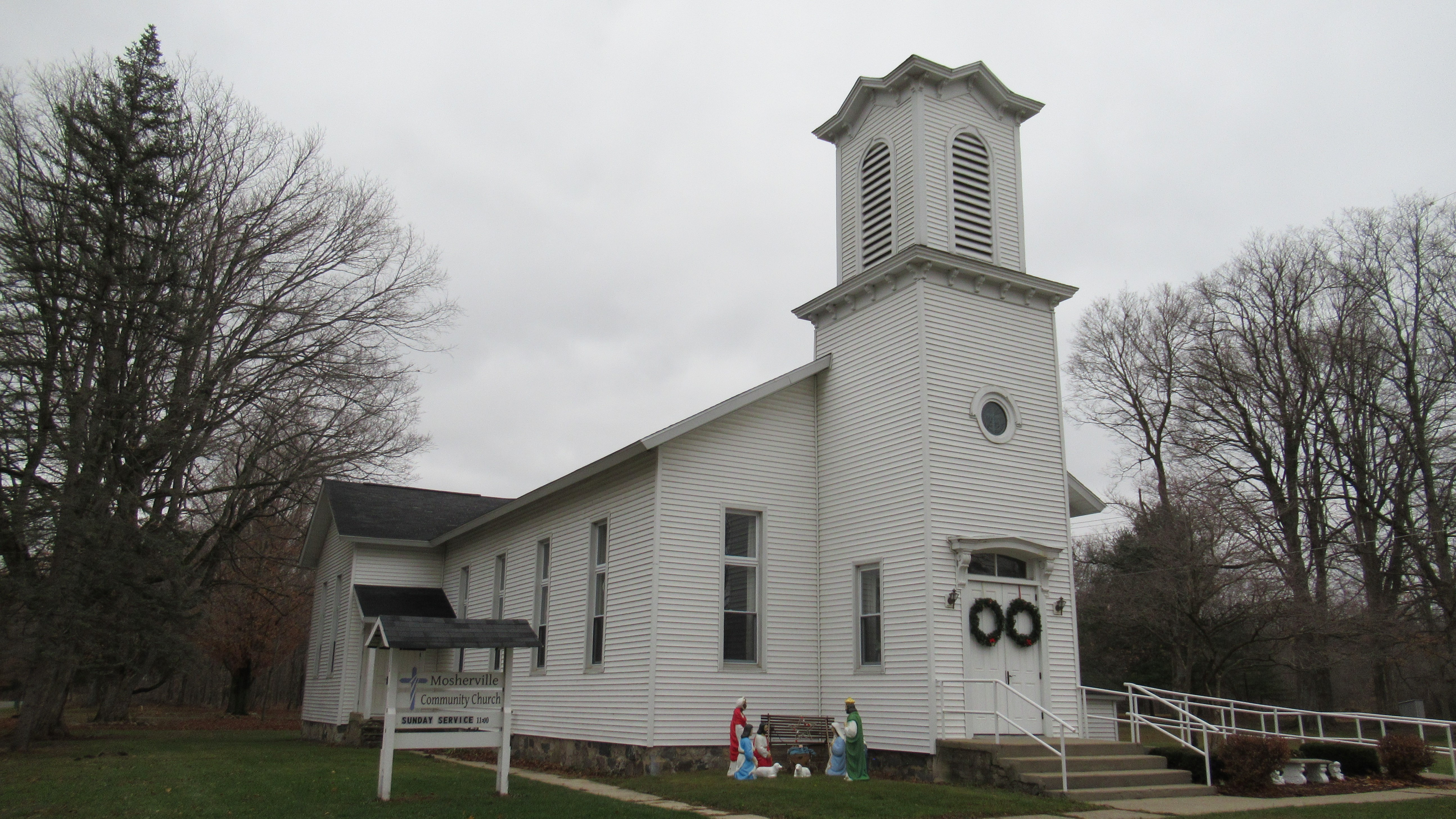
Mosherville Church

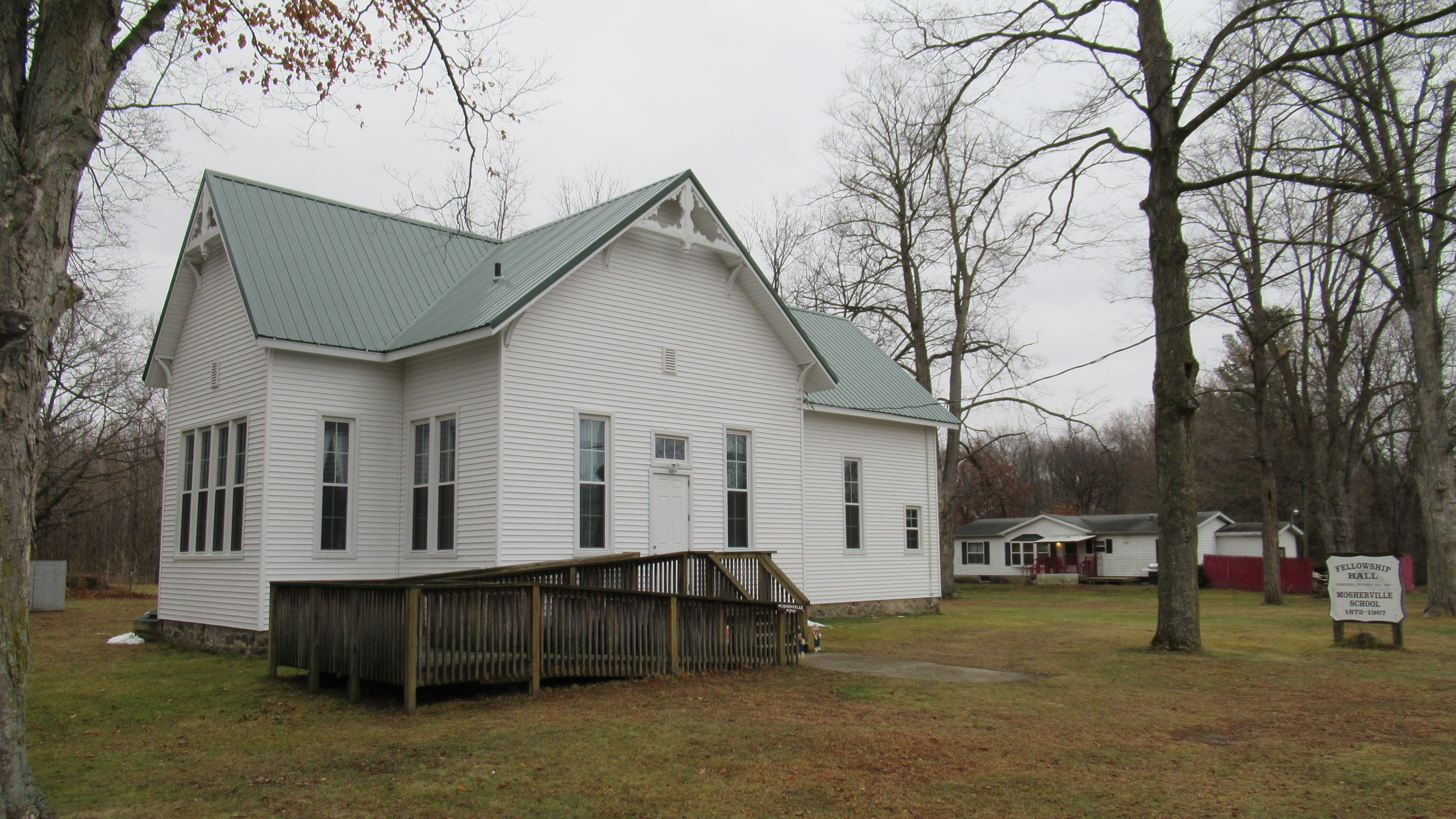
Mosherville School
