= Allen Township, Michigan =

- Civil township
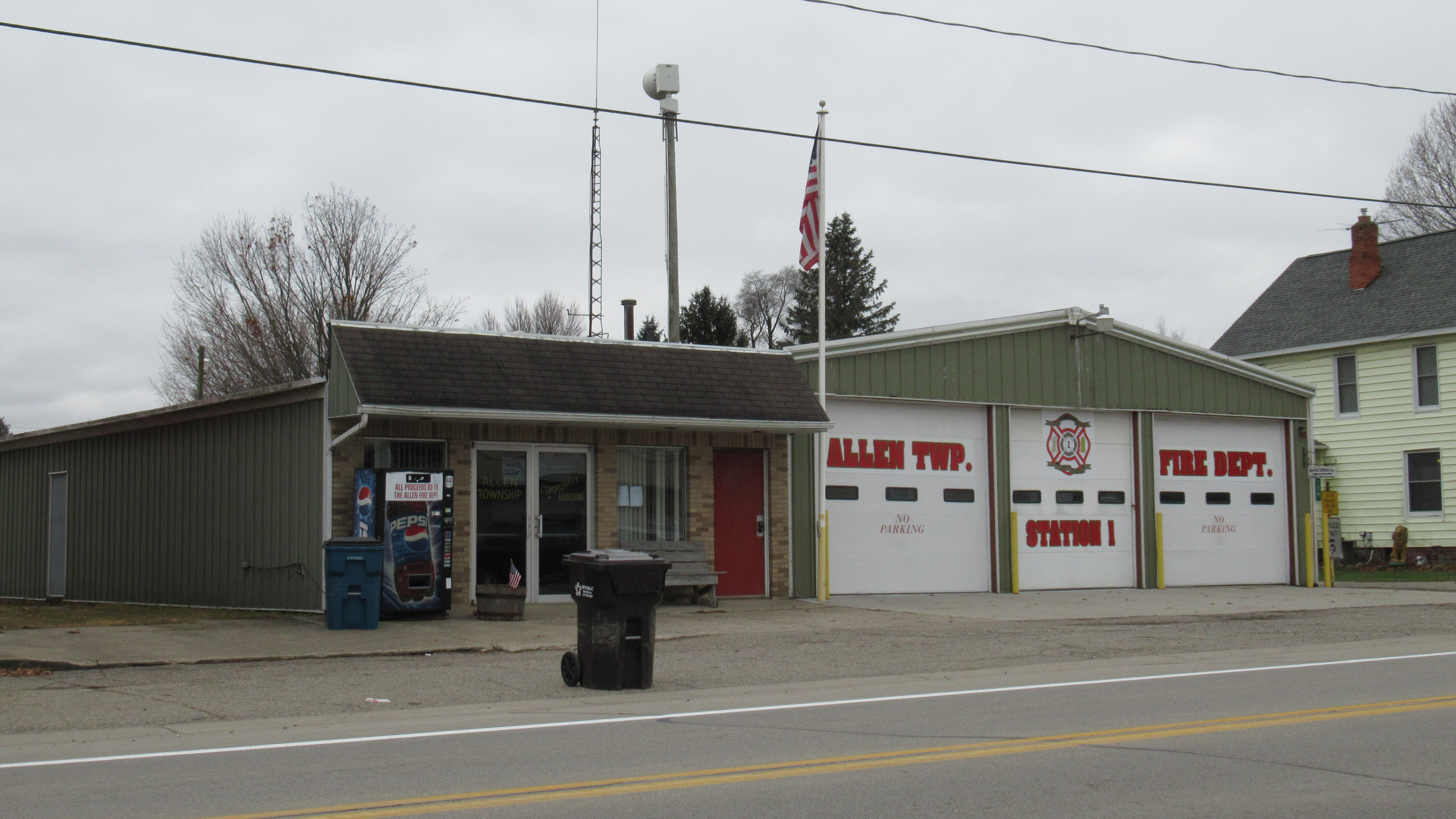
- Allen Township Hall and Fire Department

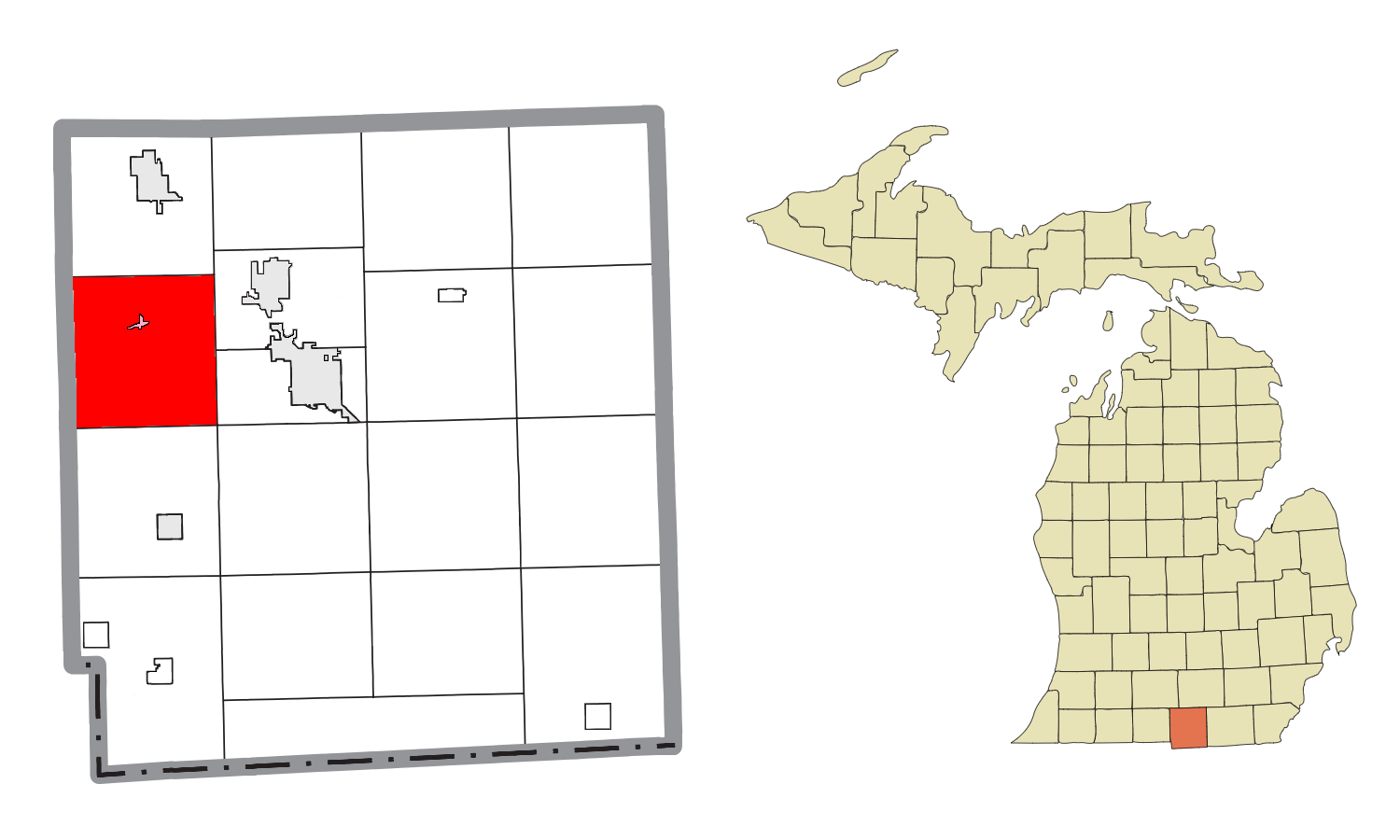
- Location within Hillsdale County (red) and the administered village of Allen (pink)

- Location within the state of Michigan Location within the United States
- Coordinates: 41°56′25″N 84°46′23″W
- Country: United States
- State: Michigan
- County: Hillsdale
- Established: 1835

Government
  - Supervisor: Steven Iles
  - Clerk: Jessica Kratzer

Area
  - Total: 36.23 sq mi (93.84 km^{2})
  - Land: 36.01 sq mi (93.27 km^{2})
  - Water: 0.22 sq mi (0.57 km^{2})
- Elevation: 1,073 ft (327 m)

Population (2020)
  - Total: 1,334
  - Density: 37/sq mi (14/km^{2})
- Time zone: UTC-5 (Eastern (EST))
  - Summer (DST): UTC-4 (EDT)
- ZIP code(s): 49082 (Quincy); 49227 (Allen); 49242 (Hillsdale); 49250 (Jonesville); 49274 (Reading)
- Area code: 517
- FIPS code: 26-01320
- GNIS feature ID: 1625821

Allen Township is a civil township of Hillsdale County in the U.S. state of Michigan. The population was 1,334 at the 2020 census.

== Communities ==
- Allen is a village within the township at the junction of U.S. Route 12 and M-49 at 41°57′29″N 84°46′05″W.

== Geography ==
According to the U.S. Census Bureau, the township has a total area of 36.23 square miles (93.84 km^{2}), of which 36.01 square miles (93.27 km^{2}) is land and 0.22 square miles (0.57 km^{2}) (0.61%) is water.

=== Major highways ===
- US 12 (Chicago Street) runs east–west through the northern portion of the township.
- M-49 runs south–north through the center of the township.

== Demographics ==
As of the census of 2000, there were 1,631 people, 599 households, and 446 families residing in the township. The population density was 45.2 inhabitants per square mile (17.5/km^{2}). There were 708 housing units at an average density of 19.6 per square mile (7.6/km^{2}). The racial makeup of the township was 97.98% White, 0.31% African American, 0.49% Native American, 0.12% Asian, 0.06% from other races, and 1.04% from two or more races. Hispanic or Latino of any race were 0.67% of the population.

There were 599 households, out of which 35.6% had children under the age of 18 living with them, 65.8% were married couples living together, 5.2% had a female householder with no husband present, and 25.4% were non-families. 21.2% of all households were made up of individuals, and 9.0% had someone living alone who was 65 years of age or older. The average household size was 2.72 and the average family size was 3.16.

In the township the population was spread out, with 28.3% under the age of 18, 7.6% from 18 to 24, 29.6% from 25 to 44, 22.9% from 45 to 64, and 11.6% who were 65 years of age or older. The median age was 36 years. For every 100 females, there were 103.4 males. For every 100 females age 18 and over, there were 93.9 males.

The median income for a household in the township was $44,213, and the median income for a family was $47,813. Males had a median income of $32,176 versus $23,203 for females. The per capita income for the township was $17,734. About 5.3% of families and 7.4% of the population were below the poverty line, including 9.1% of those under age 18 and 6.4% of those age 65 or over.

== Education ==
Adams Township is served by five separate public school districts. Most of the township and the village of Allen are served by Quincy Community School District to the west in the village of Quincy in Branch County. The north-central portion of the township is served by Litchfield Community Schools. The northeast corner of the township is served by Jonesville Community Schools. The southeast corner is served by Hillsdale Community Schools, and the southern portion of the township is served by Reading Community Schools.
