= Ed Donnelly (1950s pitcher) =

American baseball player (1932–1992)

- Pitcher
- Born: December 10, 1932; Allen, Michigan, U.S.
- Died: December 25, 1992 (aged 60); Houston, Texas, U.S.
- Batted: Right Threw: Right

MLB debut
- August 1, 1959, for the Chicago Cubs

Last MLB appearance
- September 20, 1959, for the Chicago Cubs

MLB statistics
- Win–loss record: 1–1
- Earned run average: 3.14
- Strikeouts: 6
- Stats at Baseball Reference

Teams
- Chicago Cubs (1959)

Edward Vincent Donnelly (December 10, 1932 – December 25, 1992) was an American right-handed pitcher in Major League Baseball (MLB) for the Chicago Cubs.

== Baseball career ==
Donnelly was signed as a free agent by the Kansas City Athletics before the 1956 season and was assigned to the Abilene Blue Sox. The Athletics either sold or traded his rights to the Cubs in June, and he made two more minor league stops in Ponca City and Lafayette. In the 1957–59 seasons, Donnelly worked his way through the system, toiling for Burlington and Fort Worth as well, before finally earning a promotion to the Cubs in the second half of the 1959 season.

Donnelly's major league debut came on August 1 in mop-up duty against the Cincinnati Reds. Cubs starter Glen Hobbie and reliever John Buzhardt had combined to surrender 10 runs in 4 innings of work. He induced the first batter the faced, Roy McMillan, to ground out to third base, and struck out Eddie Kasko for the second out, his first major league strikeout. The next batter was opposing pitcher Bob Purkey, who doubled for the first hit Donnelly surrendered in the big leagues, but he escaped the inning without giving up a run. Though he had surrendered two runs (one earned) in the next inning, his debut was decent—three innings, five hits, a walk, two runs (one earned), two strikeouts. That first outing would also prove to be the longest of his major league career.

Donnelly lost his third appearance before earning his first (and only) major league victory in his fourth. He was summoned to relieve Buzhardt again after the Cubs had fallen behind 7–6 through three innings. Donnelly gave up a hit and a walk, but no runs. The Cubs scored four runs in the bottom of that inning and never surrendered the lead, cruising to a 20–9 victory.

In Donnelly's final big league appearance (September 20), he threw a scoreless eighth inning as the Cubs fell to the St. Louis Cardinals. Donnelly spent the next two seasons with the Cubs' AAA affiliate, the Houston Buffs, going a combined 15–10 in 101 games (100 relief appearances, 1 start) with ERAs of 3.00 and 3.36.

Nevertheless, Donnelly was released by the Cubs, and spent 1962 and 1963 with Dallas-Fort Worth of the Pacific Coast League and Syracuse in the International League. He retired after the 1963 season, at age 30.

== Personal life ==
Donnelly died on December 25, 1992, in Houston, Texas. He is buried in Weimar, Texas, in St. Michael Catholic Cemetery. Two of Donnelly's grandsons, brothers Jarred Cosart and Jake Cosart, have also played professional baseball.
