= Jarred Cosart =

American baseball player (born 1990)

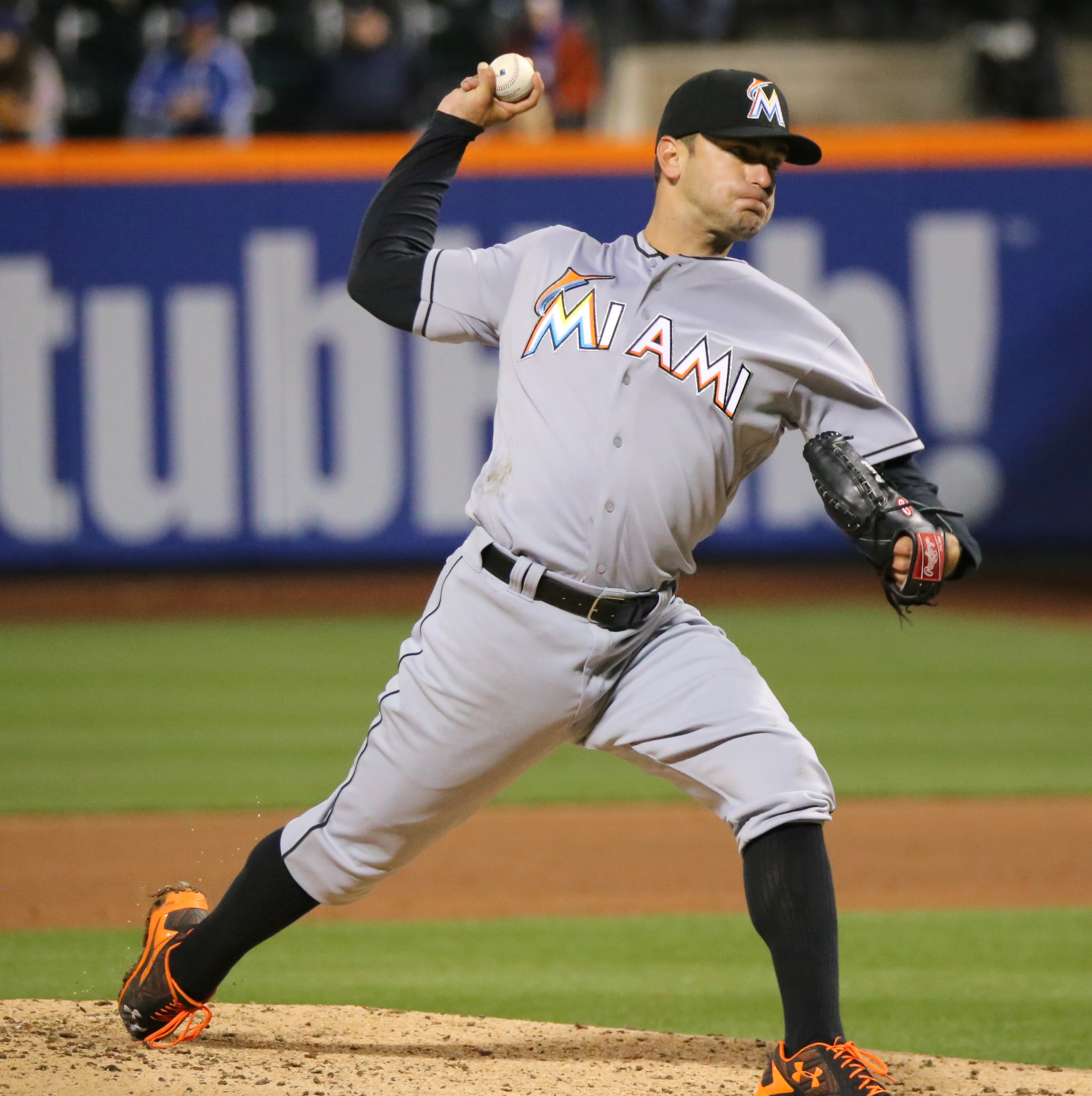
- Cosart with the Miami Marlins
- Pitcher
- Born: May 25, 1990 (age 36); League City, Texas, U.S.
- Batted: Right Threw: Right

MLB debut
- July 12, 2013, for the Houston Astros

Last MLB appearance
- June 4, 2017, for the San Diego Padres

MLB statistics
- Win–loss record: 16–23
- Earned run average: 3.98
- Strikeouts: 248
- Stats at Baseball Reference

Teams
- Houston Astros (2013–2014); Miami Marlins (2014–2016); San Diego Padres (2016–2017)

Jarred Lynn Cosart (born May 25, 1990) is an American former professional baseball pitcher. He played in Major League Baseball (MLB) for the Houston Astros, Miami Marlins, and San Diego Padres from 2013 to 2017

== Career ==
Cosart attended Clear Creek High School in League City, Texas. He signed a letter of intent with the University of Missouri.

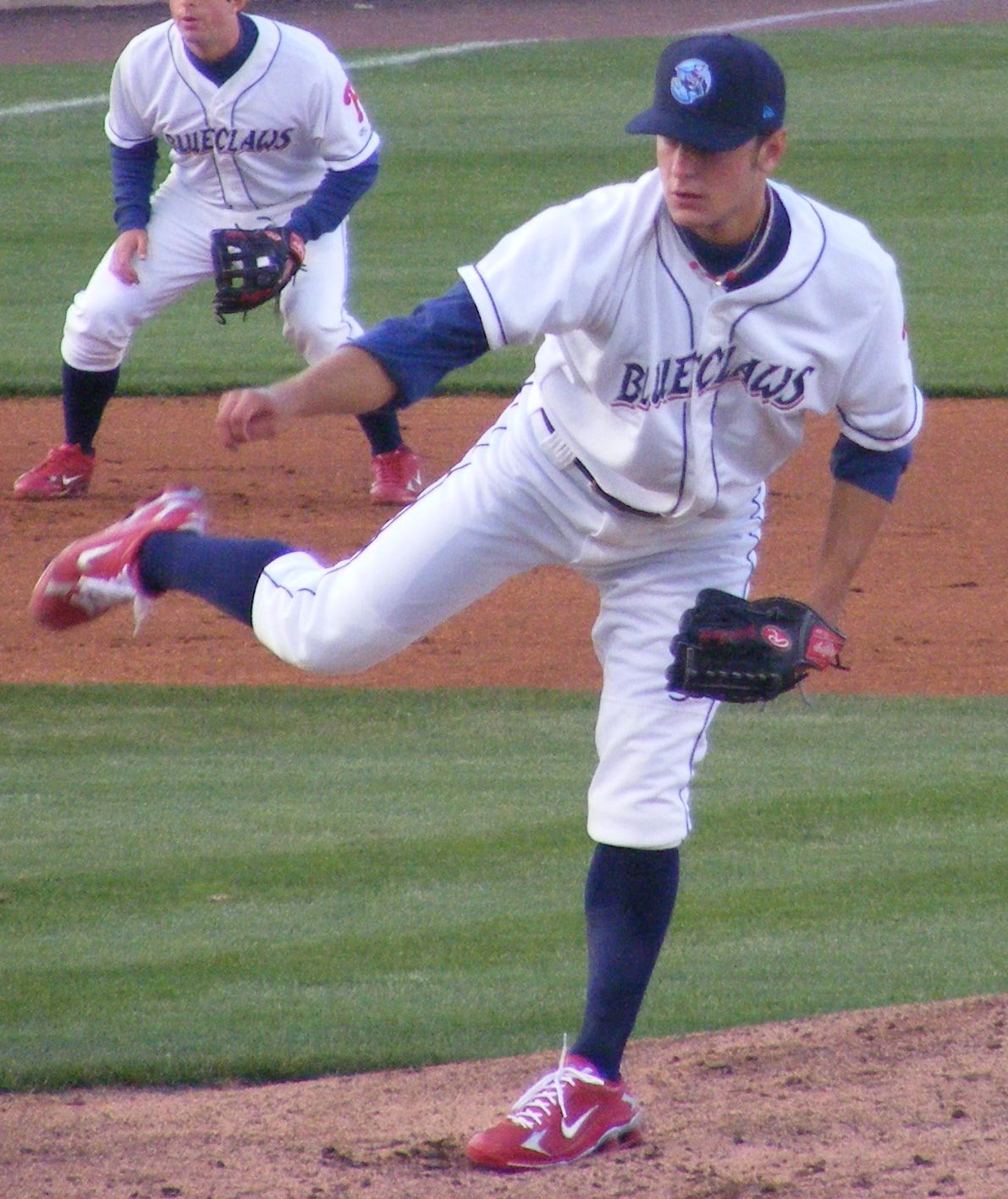
Cosart pitching for the Lakewood BlueClaws in 2010

=== Philadelphia Phillies ===
Cosart was drafted by the Philadelphia Phillies in the 38th round of the 2008 Major League Baseball draft, and signed with the Phillies.

MLB.com rated Cosart the Phillies' third best prospect going into 2011, while Baseball America rated him #70 in all of baseball. He represented the Phillies in the All-Star Futures Game in 2010 and 2011.

=== Houston Astros ===
At the 2011 trade deadline, Cosart was traded to the Houston Astros with Jon Singleton, Domingo Santana, and Josh Zeid, for Hunter Pence.

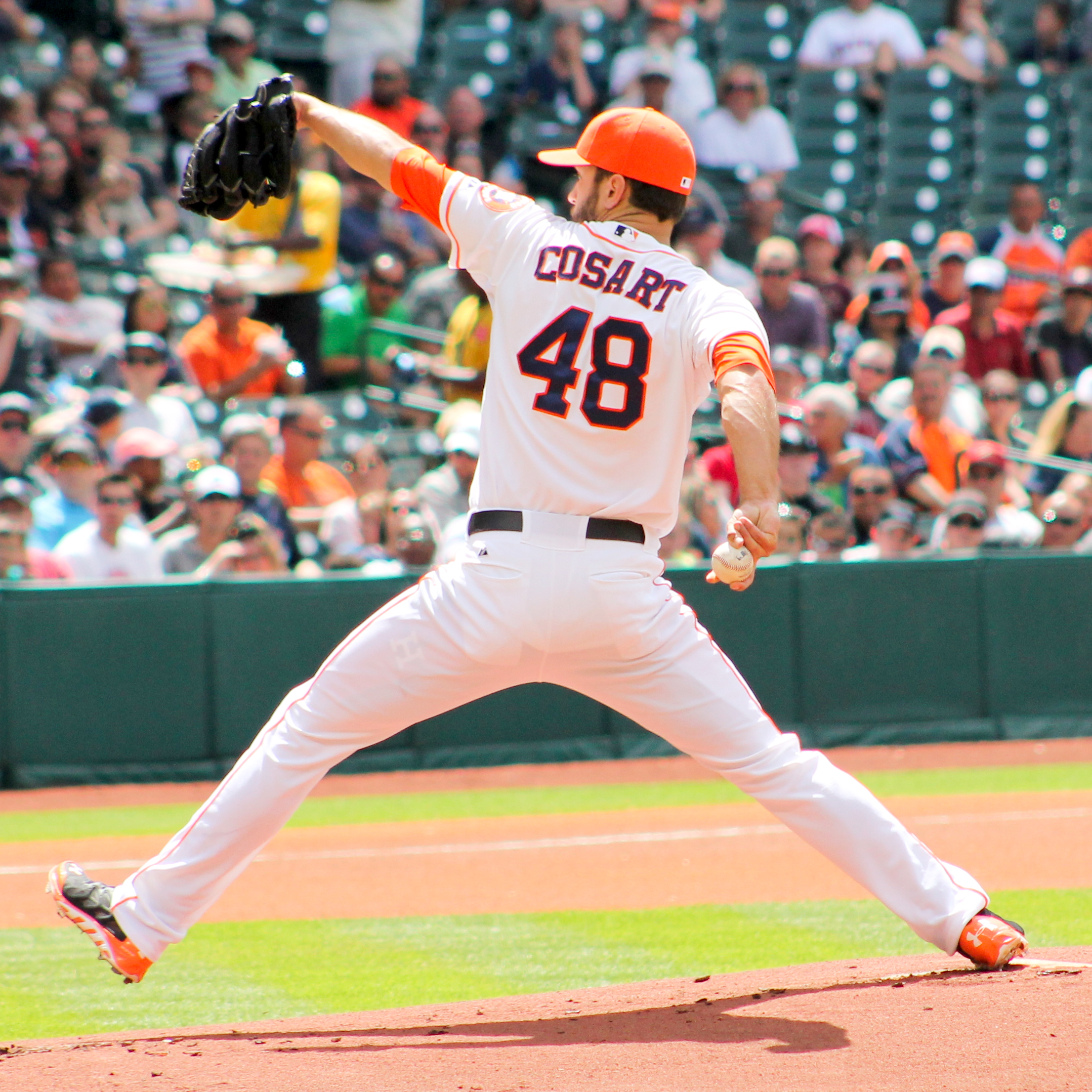
Cosart pitching for the Houston Astros in 2014

Cosart started the 2013 season with the Triple-A Oklahoma City RedHawks. He was called up by the Astros on July 12, 2013, and made his MLB debut against the Tampa Bay Rays. During his debut, he took a no-hitter through 6.1 innings until a single by Ben Zobrist. Cosart pitched 8+ innings with 2 strikeouts, 2 hits allowed, and 3 walks issued, to get his first major league win. Cosart was critical of Houston management later in his Astros career, leading to him being traded to Miami.

=== Miami Marlins ===
On July 31, 2014, the Astros traded Cosart, Enrique Hernández, and Austin Wates to the Miami Marlins for Jake Marisnick, Colin Moran, Francis Martes, and a compensatory draft pick.

Cosart started the season in the Marlins rotation and was 1–3 with a 4.08 ERA. On May 19, 2015, Cosart was placed on the disabled list with a case of vertigo. After a month on the disabled list, Cosart was activated and sent to the Marlins bullpen. Cosart returned to the rotation on July 4 but was sent down a day after by Miami to AAA.

=== San Diego Padres ===
On July 29, 2016, the Marlins traded Cosart, Josh Naylor, Carter Capps, and Luis Castillo to the San Diego Padres for Andrew Cashner, Colin Rea, Tayron Guerrero, and cash considerations. He elected to become a free agent after the Padres outrighted him on October 30, 2017.

== Personal life ==
Cosart is the grandson of former Chicago Cubs' pitcher Ed Donnelly. His younger brother, Jake Cosart, was drafted by the Boston Red Sox in 2014 and has pitched in Minor League Baseball.

In March 2015, MLB began to investigate Cosart for sports gambling after an alleged direct messaging conversation on Twitter involving Cosart was made public. Cosart denied any involvement in gambling on baseball. MLB fined Cosart for gambling on other sports, but determined that he did not gamble on baseball.
