= M-49 (Michigan highway) =

State highway in Hillsdale County, Michigan, United States

M-49
- M-49 highlighted in red

Route information
- Maintained by MDOT
- Length: 25.480 mi (41.006 km)
- Existed: 1930–present

Major junctions
- South end: SR 49 at the Ohio state line
- US 12 in Allen
- North end: M-99 in Litchfield

Location
- Country: United States
- State: Michigan
- Counties: Hillsdale

Highway system
- Michigan State Trunkline Highway System; Interstate; US; State; Byways
| ← M-48 | → M-50 |

M-49 is a north–south state trunkline highway in the south-central portion of the US state of Michigan. It runs from the Ohio state line north to Litchfield through rural Hillsdale County. M-49 is the only Michigan highway in which the road crossing into another state has the same state highway number. M-49 continues as State Route 49 (SR 49), near the Indiana–Michigan–Ohio tripoint south of Camden. The highway dates back to 1930 and was only altered once in the 1940s. M-49 runs through Southern Michigan farmlands connecting several small towns along its path. At one point, M-49 briefly runs concurrently with US Highway 12 (US 12).

== Route description ==
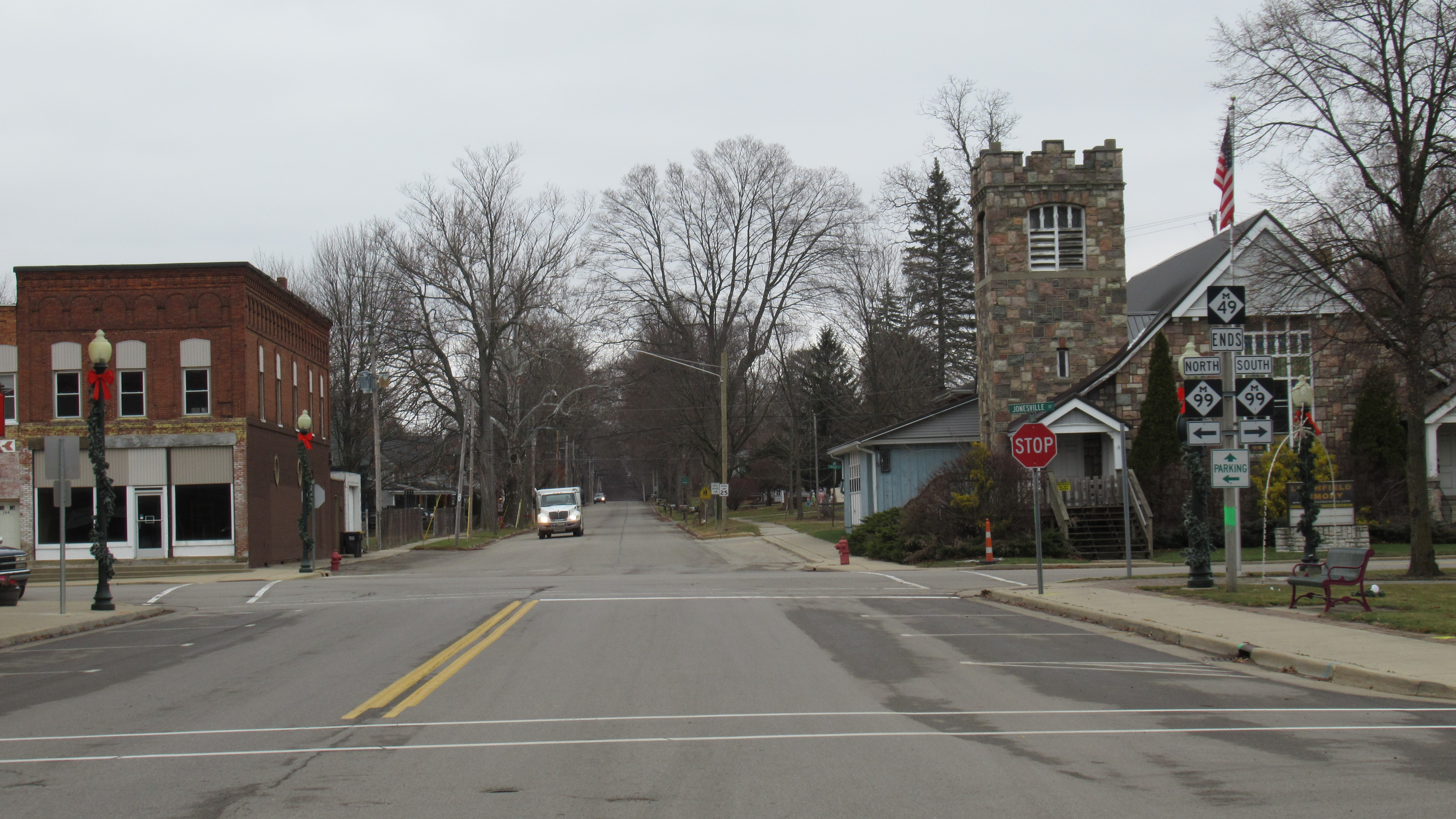
Northern terminus of M-49 at M-99 in Litchfield

M-49 starts as the continuation of SR 49 into Michigan from Ohio. The highway crosses the state line south of Camden east of the tripoint with Indiana and Ohio. Running north through rural Hillsdale County, the roadway follows Edon Road through farm land. The highway follows two sweeping curves to cross Territorial Road and continue into the village of Camden. M-49 follows Main Street through town and turns northeasterly on the north side of the village on the way to Reading. Returning to a due-north course, the highway crosses a branch of the Indiana Northeastern Railroad on the south side of Reading. The Edon Road name gives way to Main Street through the city. M-49 runs north out of Reading, once again called Edon Road, through farm lands dotted with occasional trees. At Weston Road on the southeast side of Allen, the highway turns to the northeast to a junction with US 12 (Chicago Road). M-49 turns west along US 12, running concurrently into the village. M-49 resumes its northerly course at Railroad Street, separating from US 12 in the process. Outside of town, the roadway changes names to Allen Road, and through more Southern Michigan farmland, M-49 runs north to Genesee Road. The highway turns east on Genesee to Anderson Road, and then north to Litchfield. Crossing into that city, M-49 follows Chicago Street to the intersection with M-99 downtown. At that junction, M-49 terminates nearly 25.5 miles (41.0 km) north of the state line. No part of the highway has been listed on the National Highway System, a system of highways important to the nation's economy, defense, and mobility.

== History ==
M-49 was added to the state highway system in 1930, running along its current routing between M-9 (now M-99) in Litchfield and the Ohio state line south of Camden. Near the state line, the highway jogged along Territorial Road for a short distance to make the connection with the continuation of SR 49. The second version of M-120 ran concurrently with M-49 on this section of Territorial Road starting in 1939. This concurrency was removed in late 1946 or early 1947 when M-49 was realigned to smooth out the corners in the roadway at M-120. The routing of M-49 has remained the same since. It is currently the only state highway that connects with a like-numbered state highway from another state. The only other highways in Michigan to share a number with a cross-border connection are components of the Interstate Highway System or the United States Numbered Highways.

== Major intersections ==
The entire highway is in Hillsdale County.

| Location | mi | km | Destinations | Notes |
|---|---|---|---|---|
| Camden Township | 0.000 | 0.000 | SR 49 south – Edgerton | Ohio state line |
| Allen Township | 18.560 | 29.869 | US 12 east – Ypsilanti | Eastern end of US 12 concurrency |
| Allen | 19.085 | 30.714 | US 12 west – Coldwater | Western end of US 12 concurrency |
| Litchfield | 25.480 | 41.006 | M-99 – Albion, Hillsdale | |
1.000 mi = 1.609 km; 1.000 km = 0.621 mi: Concurrency terminus
