= Allen, Michigan =

- Village
- Village of Allen
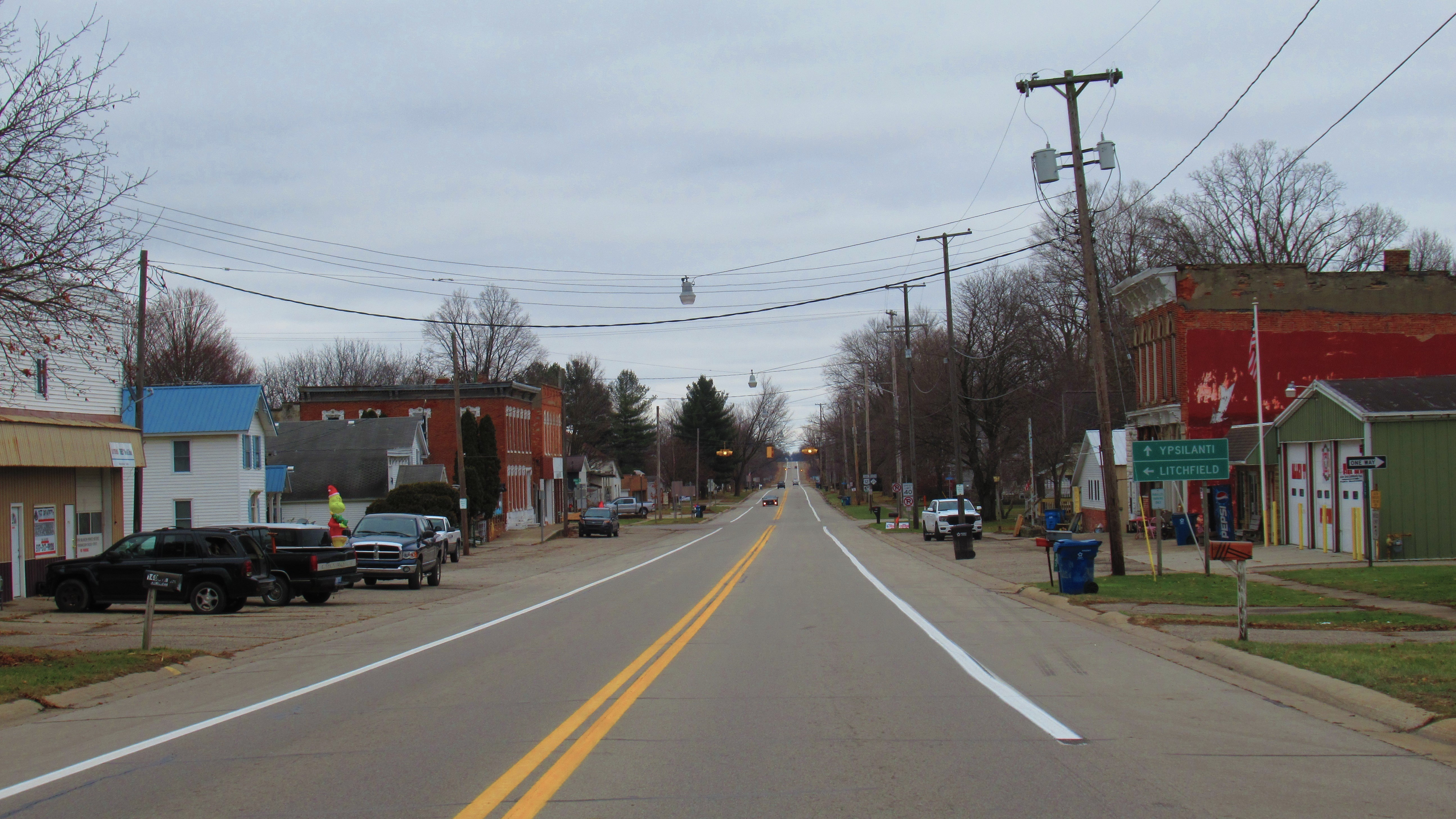
- Looking east along W. Chicago Road (US 12)
- Nickname: "Antique Capital of Michigan"
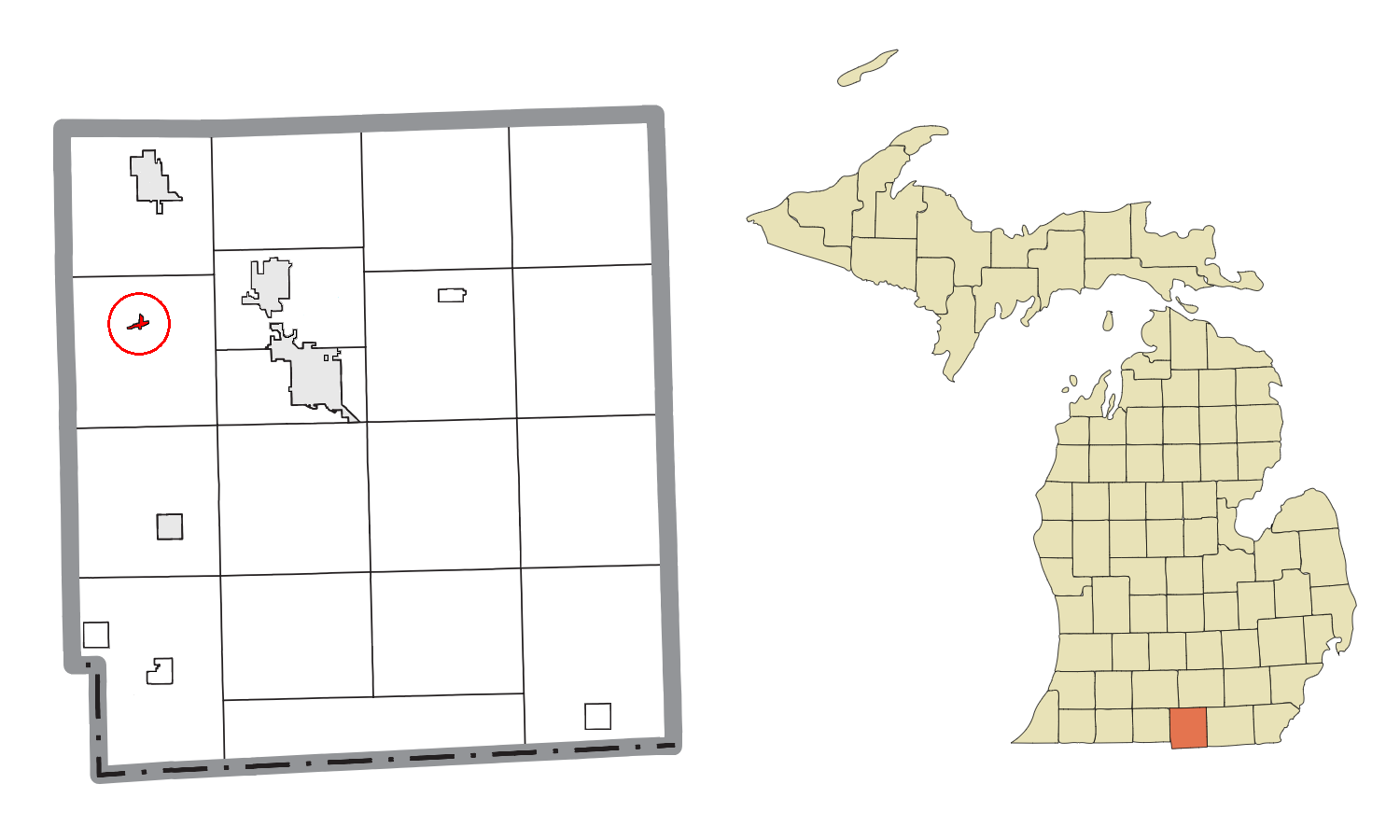
- Location within Hillsdale County

- Location within the state of Michigan Location within the United States
- Coordinates: 41°57′29″N 84°46′05″W
- Country: United States
- State: Michigan
- County: Hillsdale
- Township: Allen
- Settled: 1827
- Platted: 1868
- Incorporated: 1950

Government
  - Type: Village council
  - President: Paul Seegert
  - Clerk: Melani Matthews

Area
  - Total: 0.174 sq mi (0.451 km^{2})
  - Land: 0.174 sq mi (0.451 km^{2})
  - Water: 0 sq mi (0.00 km^{2})
- Elevation: 1,076 ft (328 m)

Population (2020)
  - Total: 201
  - Density: 1,156.7/sq mi (446.62/km^{2})
- Time zone: UTC-5 (Eastern (EST))
  - Summer (DST): UTC-4 (EDT)
- ZIP code(s): 49227
- Area code: 517
- FIPS code: 26-01300
- GNIS feature ID: 2397933

Allen is a village in Hillsdale County in the U.S. state of Michigan. The population was 201 at the 2020 census.

The village is within Allen Township at the junction of U.S. Route 12 and M-49. With a total land area of only 0.174 square miles (0.451 km^{2}), Allen is the fourth smallest village by land area in the state of Michigan and the fifth smallest municipality overall after Ahmeek, Copper City, Novi Township, and Eagle.

== History ==
The community was first settled by War of 1812 veteran Captain Moses Allen and his family in 1827. A post office under the name Sylvanus opened on July 13, 1830. It closed briefly from September 5, 1834, to September 9, 1835. The name of the office was changed to Allen in honor of Moses Allen on August 17, 1868. The community was thriving and was platted that same year, and Allen received a railway depot along the Lake Shore and Michigan Southern Railway. In 1950, Allen incorporated as a village.

== Geography ==
According to the U.S. Census Bureau, the village has a total area of 0.174 square miles (0.451 km^{2}), all land.

=== Major highways ===
- US 12 (W. Chicago Street) runs east–west through the center of the village.
- M-49 (N. Railroad Street) enters the village from the north and briefly runs concurrently with US 12.

== Demographics ==
Historical population
Census	Pop.	Note	%±
1960	325		—
1970	385		18.5%
1980	266		−30.9%
1990	201		−24.4%
2000	225		11.9%
2010	191		−15.1%
2020	201		5.2%
U.S. Decennial Census

=== 2010 census ===
As of the census of 2010, there were 191 people, 80 households, and 51 families residing in the village. The population density was 1,193.8 inhabitants per square mile (460.9/km^{2}). There were 94 housing units at an average density of 587.5 per square mile (226.8/km^{2}). The racial makeup of the village was 97.9% White, 1.0% Asian, and 1.0% from two or more races.

There were 80 households, of which 23.8% had children under the age of 18 living with them, 56.3% were married couples living together, 6.3% had a female householder with no husband present, 1.3% had a male householder with no wife present, and 36.3% were non-families. 25.0% of all households were made up of individuals, and 18.8% had someone living alone who was 65 years of age or older. The average household size was 2.39 and the average family size was 2.94.

The median age in the village was 45.8 years. 19.4% of residents were under the age of 18; 7.8% were between the ages of 18 and 24; 22.1% were from 25 to 44; 26.7% were from 45 to 64; and 24.1% were 65 years of age or older. The gender makeup of the village was 49.7% male and 50.3% female.

=== 2000 census ===
As of the census of 2000, there were 225 people, 87 households, and 58 families residing in the village. The population density was 1,470.7 inhabitants per square mile (567.8/km^{2}). There were 93 housing units at an average density of 607.9 per square mile (234.7/km^{2}). The racial makeup of the village was 98.67% White, and 1.33% from two or more races.

There were 87 households, out of which 32.2% had children under the age of 18 living with them, 57.5% were married couples living together, 5.7% had a female householder with no husband present, and 32.2% were non-families. 28.7% of all households were made up of individuals, and 16.1% had someone living alone who was 65 years of age or older. The average household size was 2.59 and the average family size was 3.22.

In the village, the population was spread out, with 27.6% under the age of 18, 7.1% from 18 to 24, 27.1% from 25 to 44, 21.3% from 45 to 64, and 16.9% who were 65 years of age or older. The median age was 38 years. For every 100 females, there were 95.7 males. For every 100 females age 18 and over, there were 87.4 males.

The median income for a household in the village was $42,344, and the median income for a family was $45,417. Males had a median income of $30,250 versus $21,111 for females. The per capita income for the village was $14,251. About 8.0% of families and 5.5% of the population were below the poverty line, including none of those under the age of eighteen or sixty five or over.

== Education ==
The village is served entirely by the Quincy Community School District to the west in the village of Quincy in Branch County.

== Notable people ==
- Ed Donnelly, professional Major League Baseball player, born in Allen
- Charles Edward St. John, astronomer and college professor, born in Allen

== Images ==
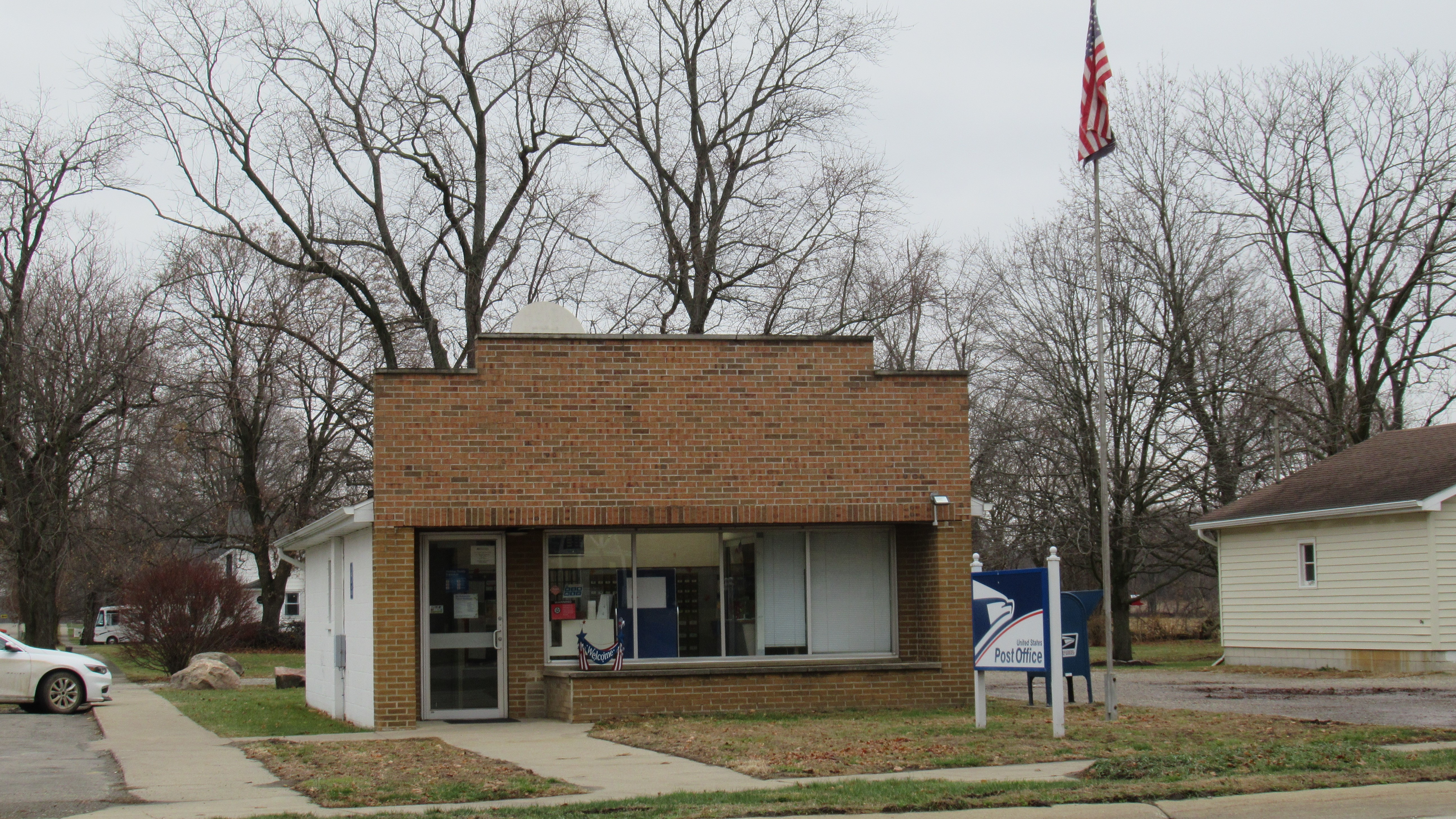
U.S. Post Office in Allen

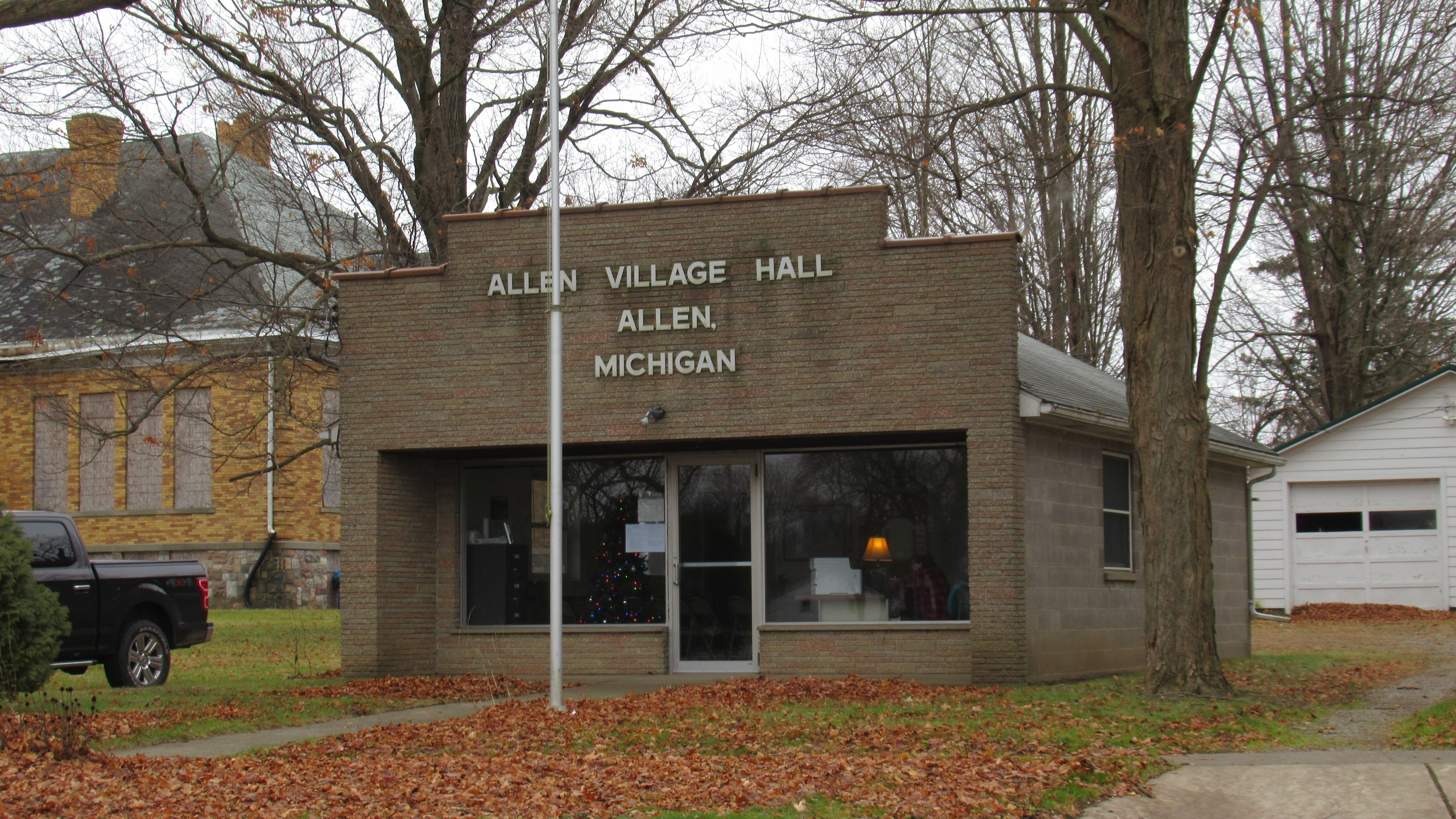
Allen Village Hall

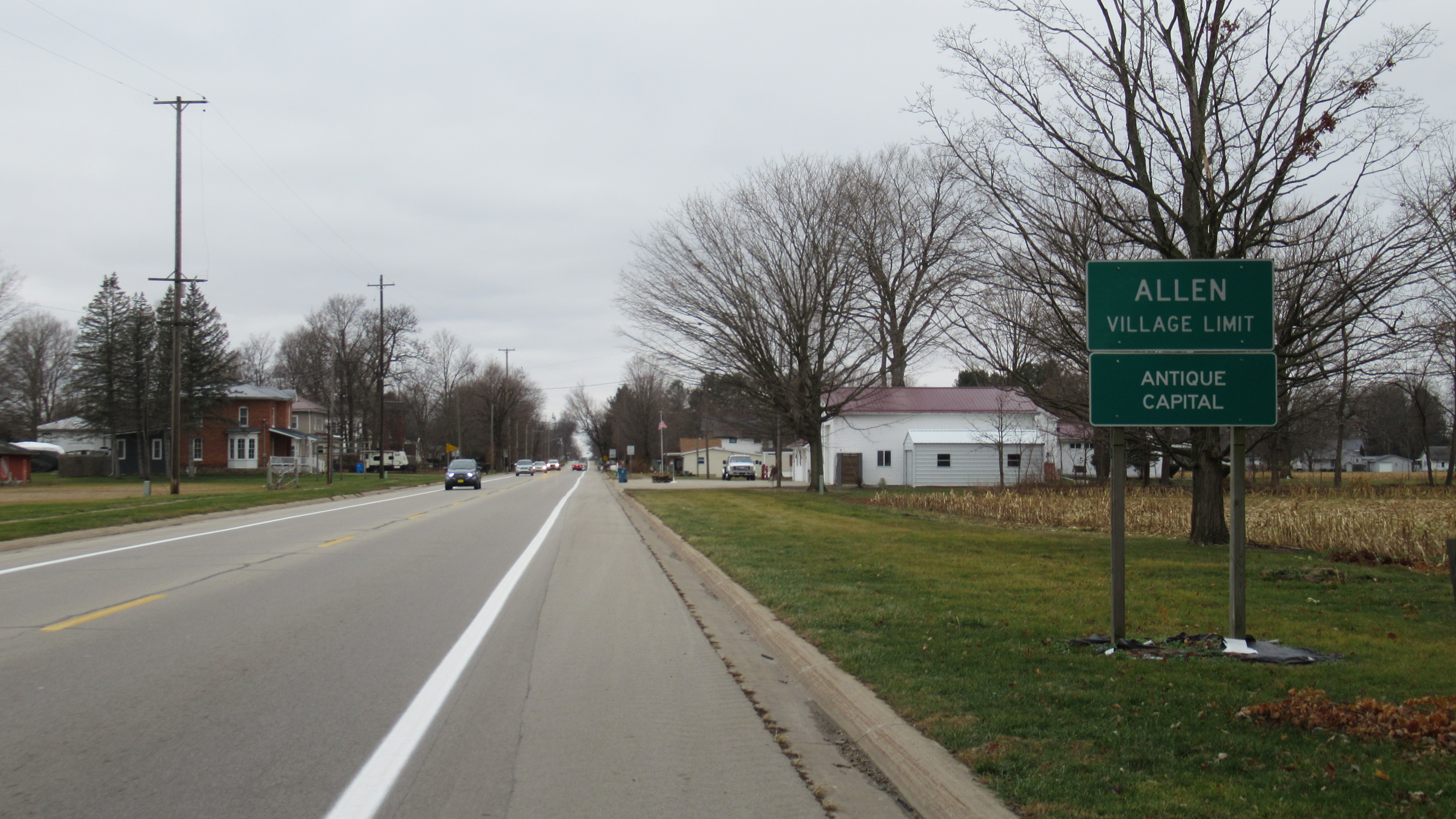
Signage westward along US 12 / M-49

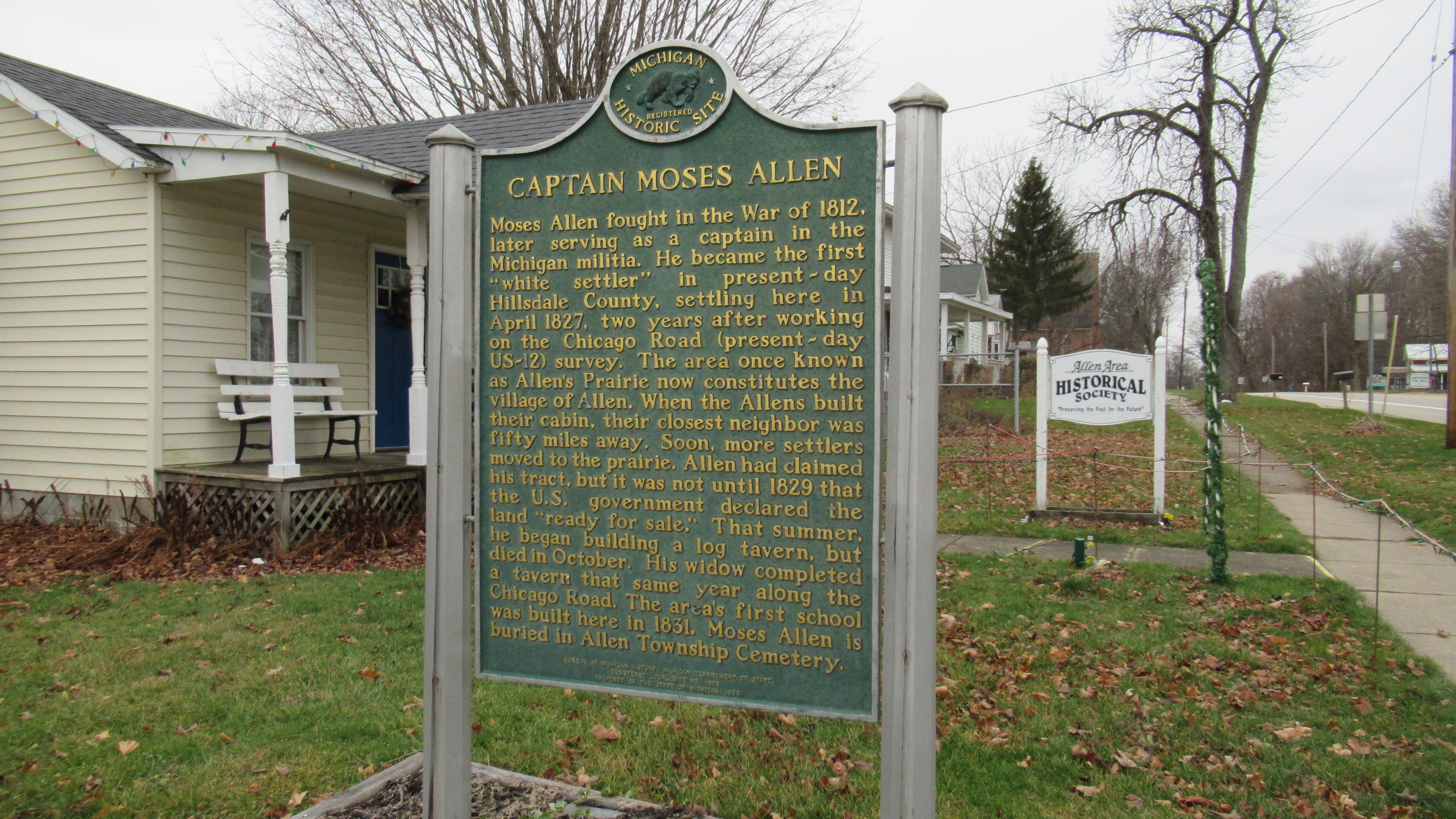
Captain Moses Allen historic marker
