= Litchfield, Michigan =

- City
- City of Litchfield
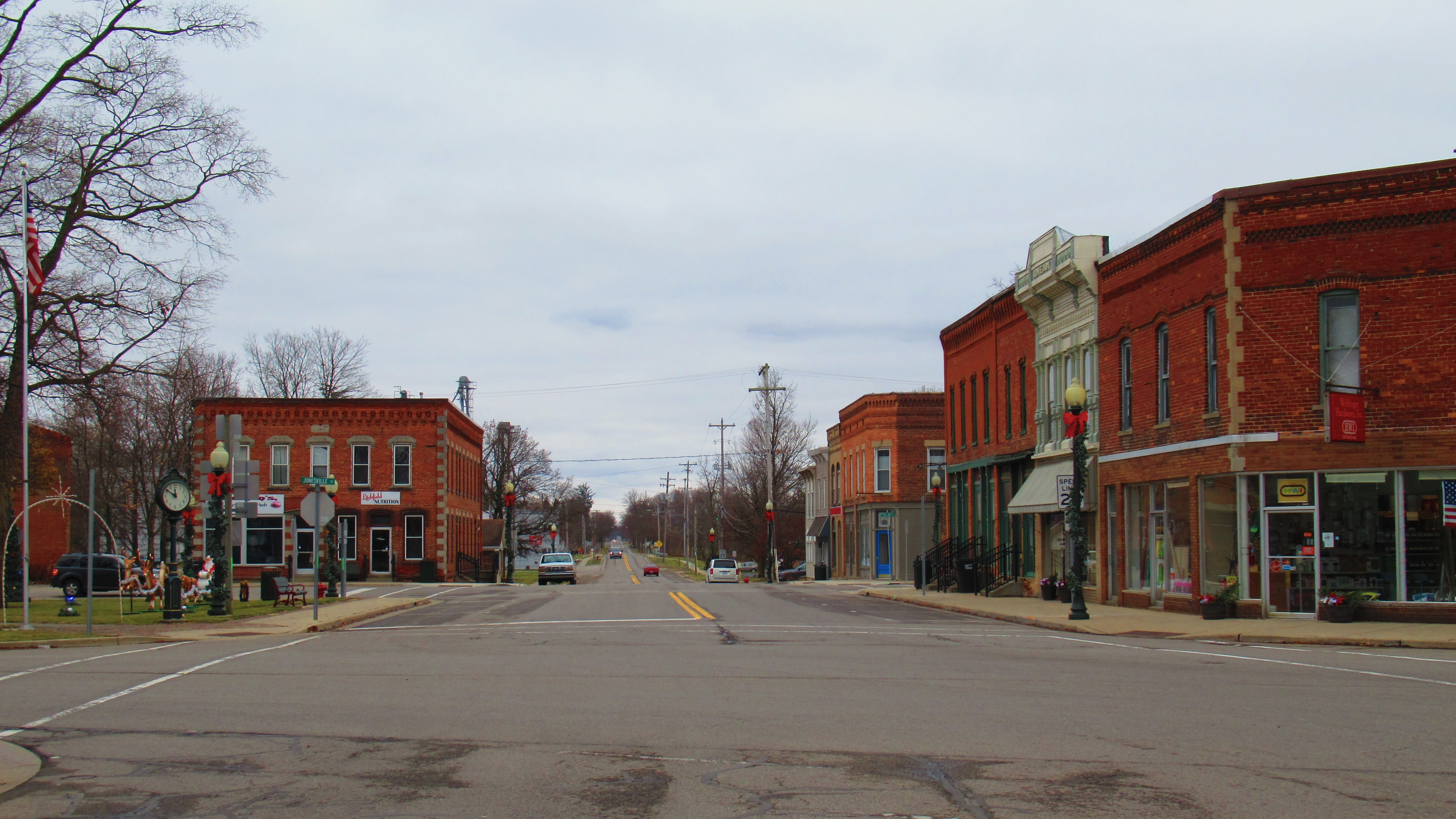
- Downtown at the intersection of M-49 and M-99

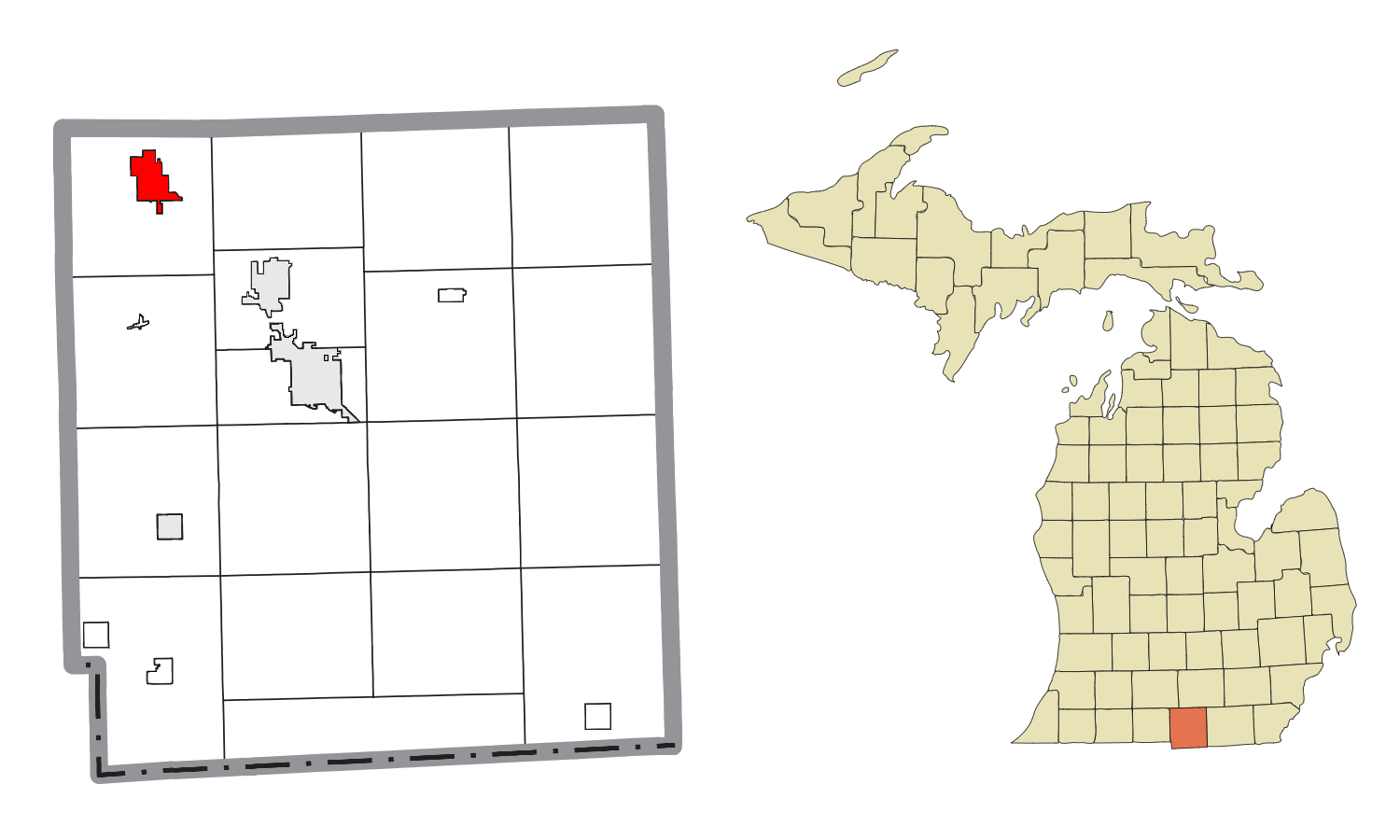
- Location within Hillsdale County

- Location within the state of Michigan Location within the United States
- Coordinates: 42°02′35″N 84°45′25″W
- Country: United States
- State: Michigan
- County: Hillsdale
- Settled: 1834
- Platted: 1836
- Incorporated: 1877 (village); 1970 (city)

Government
  - Type: Council–manager
  - Mayor: Jessica Bills
  - Clerk: Susan Ballinger
  - Manager: Nicole Benson

Area
  - Total: 2.81 sq mi (7.28 km^{2})
  - Land: 2.78 sq mi (7.20 km^{2})
  - Water: 0.039 sq mi (0.10 km^{2})
- Elevation: 1,024 ft (312 m)

Population (2020)
  - Total: 1,399
  - Density: 503.9/sq mi (194.55/km^{2})
- Time zone: UTC-5 (Eastern (EST))
  - Summer (DST): UTC-4 (EDT)
- ZIP code(s): 49252
- Area code: 517
- FIPS code: 26-47980
- GNIS feature ID: 0630540
- Website: Official website

Litchfield is a city in Hillsdale County in the U.S. state of Michigan. The population was 1,399 at the 2020 census.

The city is surrounded by Litchfield Township, but the two are administered autonomously.

== History ==
The area was first settled by Henry Stevens in 1834. It was platted in 1836 by Hervey Smith and his son David, and the community was named Smithsville. Hervey became the first postmaster when the post office opened on February 3, 1837. The post office was named Columbus, and it was renamed to Litchfield on August 12, 1837. Stevens proposed the name after Litchfield, Connecticut, where many of the early settlers originated. Litchfield incorporated as a village in 1877. The village was part of Litchfield Township until it incorporated as a city in 1970.

== Geography ==
According to the U.S. Census Bureau, the city has a total area of 2.81 square miles (7.28 km^{2}), of which 2.78 square miles (7.20 km^{2}) is land and 0.04 square miles (0.10 km^{2}) (1.42%) is water.

The St. Joseph River flows through the city. The North Country Trail also runs through the center of the city.

=== Major highways ===
- M-49 (S. Chicago Street) enters the city from the south and has its northern terminus at M-99.
- M-99 runs through the downtown area of the city.

== Demographics ==
Historical population
Census	Pop.	Note	%±
1880	1,029		—
1890	601		−41.6%
1900	645		7.3%
1910	660		2.3%
1920	716		8.5%
1930	634		−11.5%
1940	717		13.1%
1950	882		23.0%
1960	993		12.6%
1970	1,167		17.5%
1980	1,353		15.9%
1990	1,317		−2.7%
2000	1,458		10.7%
2010	1,369		−6.1%
2020	1,399		2.2%
U.S. Decennial Census

=== 2010 census ===
As of the census of 2010, there were 1,369 people, 559 households, and 365 families living in the city. The population density was 547.6 inhabitants per square mile (211.4/km^{2}). There were 616 housing units at an average density of 246.4 per square mile (95.1/km^{2}). The racial makeup of the city was 96.9% White, 0.3% African American, 0.7% Native American, 0.1% Asian, 1.1% from other races, and 0.9% from two or more races. Hispanic or Latino of any race were 2.9% of the population.

There were 559 households, of which 32.7% had children under the age of 18 living with them, 45.6% were married couples living together, 12.2% had a female householder with no husband present, 7.5% had a male householder with no wife present, and 34.7% were non-families. 29.2% of all households were made up of individuals, and 12.3% had someone living alone who was 65 years of age or older. The average household size was 2.44 and the average family size was 2.99.

The median age in the city was 38.4 years. 25.6% of residents were under the age of 18; 9% were between the ages of 18 and 24; 23.4% were from 25 to 44; 27% were from 45 to 64; and 15% were 65 years of age or older. The gender makeup of the city was 49.8% male and 50.2% female.

=== 2000 census ===
As of the census of 2000, there were 1,458 people, 568 households, and 362 families living in the city. The population density was 608.9 inhabitants per square mile (235.1/km^{2}). There were 604 housing units at an average density of 252.2 per square mile (97.4/km^{2}). The racial makeup of the city was 98.42% White, 0.21% African American, 0.07% Asian, 0.62% from other races, and 0.69% from two or more races. Hispanic or Latino of any race were 1.99% of the population.

There were 568 households, out of which 34.2% had children under the age of 18 living with them, 47.7% were married couples living together, 11.4% had a female householder with no husband present, and 36.1% were non-families. 31.9% of all households were made up of individuals, and 15.1% had someone living alone who was 65 years of age or older. The average household size was 2.40 and the average family size was 3.04.

In the city, the population was spread out, with 26.3% under the age of 18, 9.3% from 18 to 24, 26.2% from 25 to 44, 20.3% from 45 to 64, and 17.8% who were 65 years of age or older. The median age was 37 years. For every 100 females, there were 87.6 males. For every 100 females age 18 and over, there were 85.8 males.

The median income for a household in the city was $39,292, and the median income for a family was $47,500. Males had a median income of $34,464 versus $24,671 for females. The per capita income for the city was $17,362. About 5.6% of families and 10.3% of the population were below the poverty line, including 7.2% of those under age 18 and 17.9% of those age 65 or over.

== Education ==
The city is served entirely by its own school district, Litchfield Community Schools, which also serves portions of several adjacent townships.

== Notable people ==
- Marion Babcock Baxter, lecturer and author, born in Litchfield

== Images ==
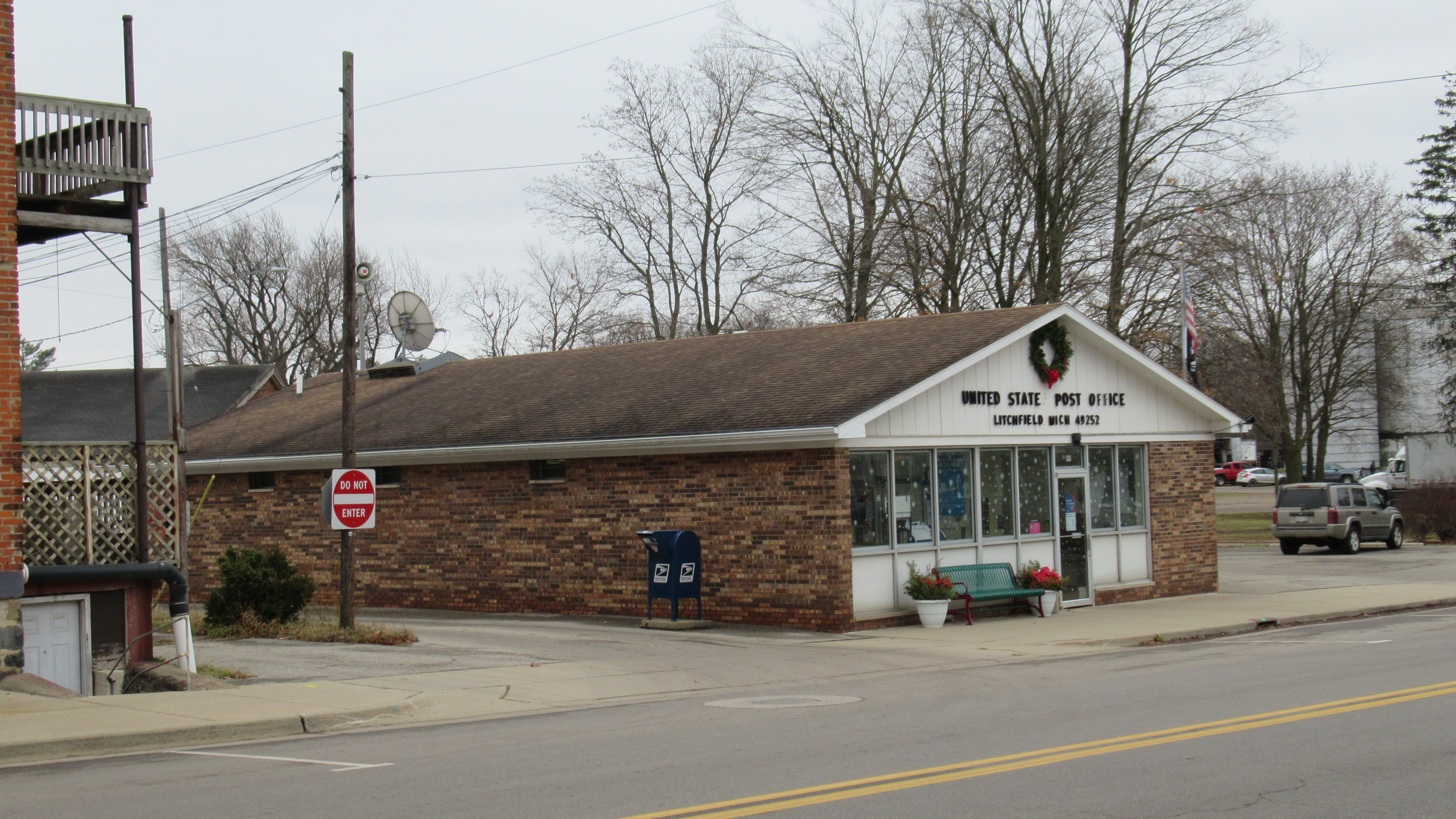
U.S. Post Office in Litchfield

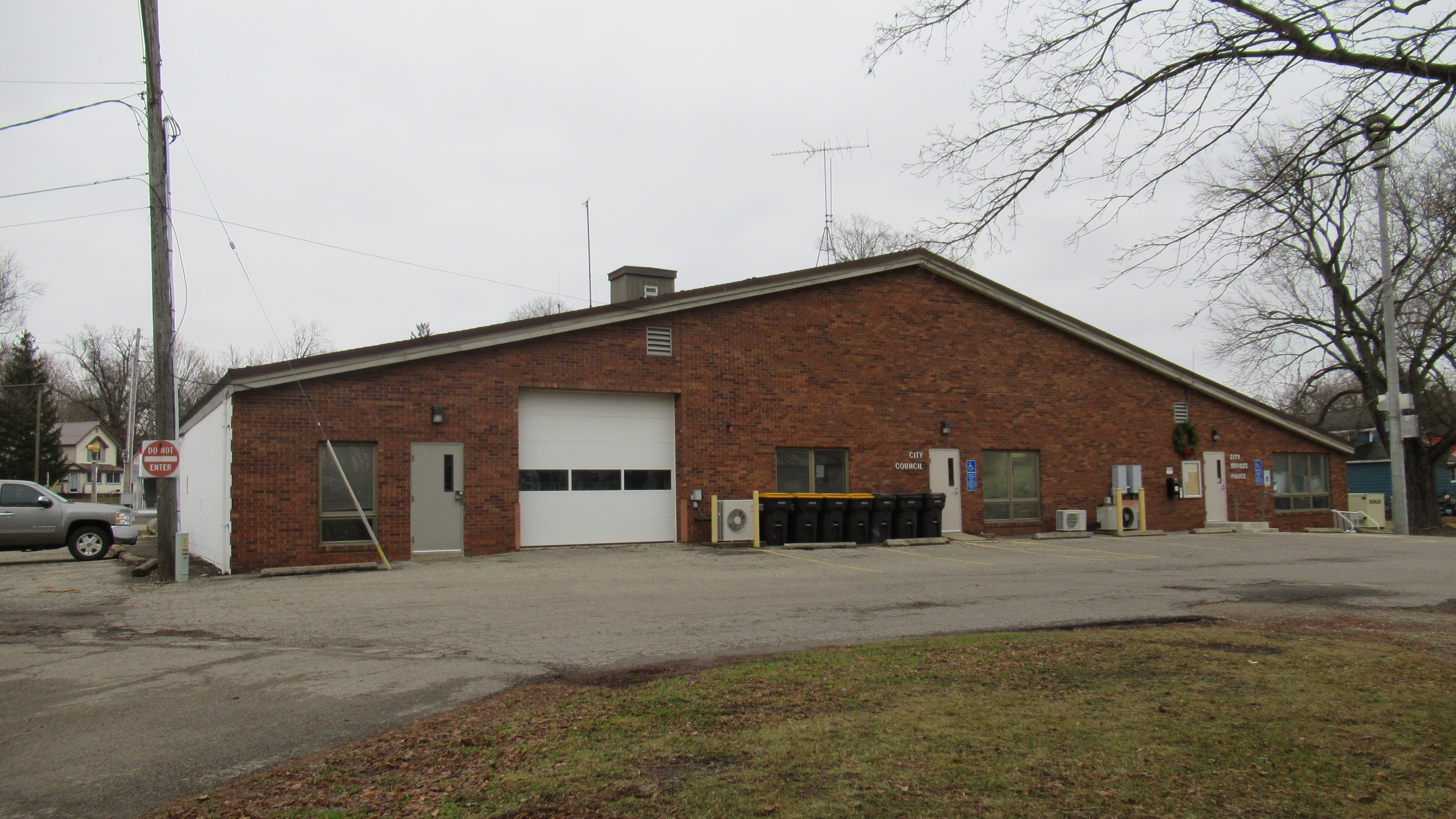
Litchfield Municipal Offices

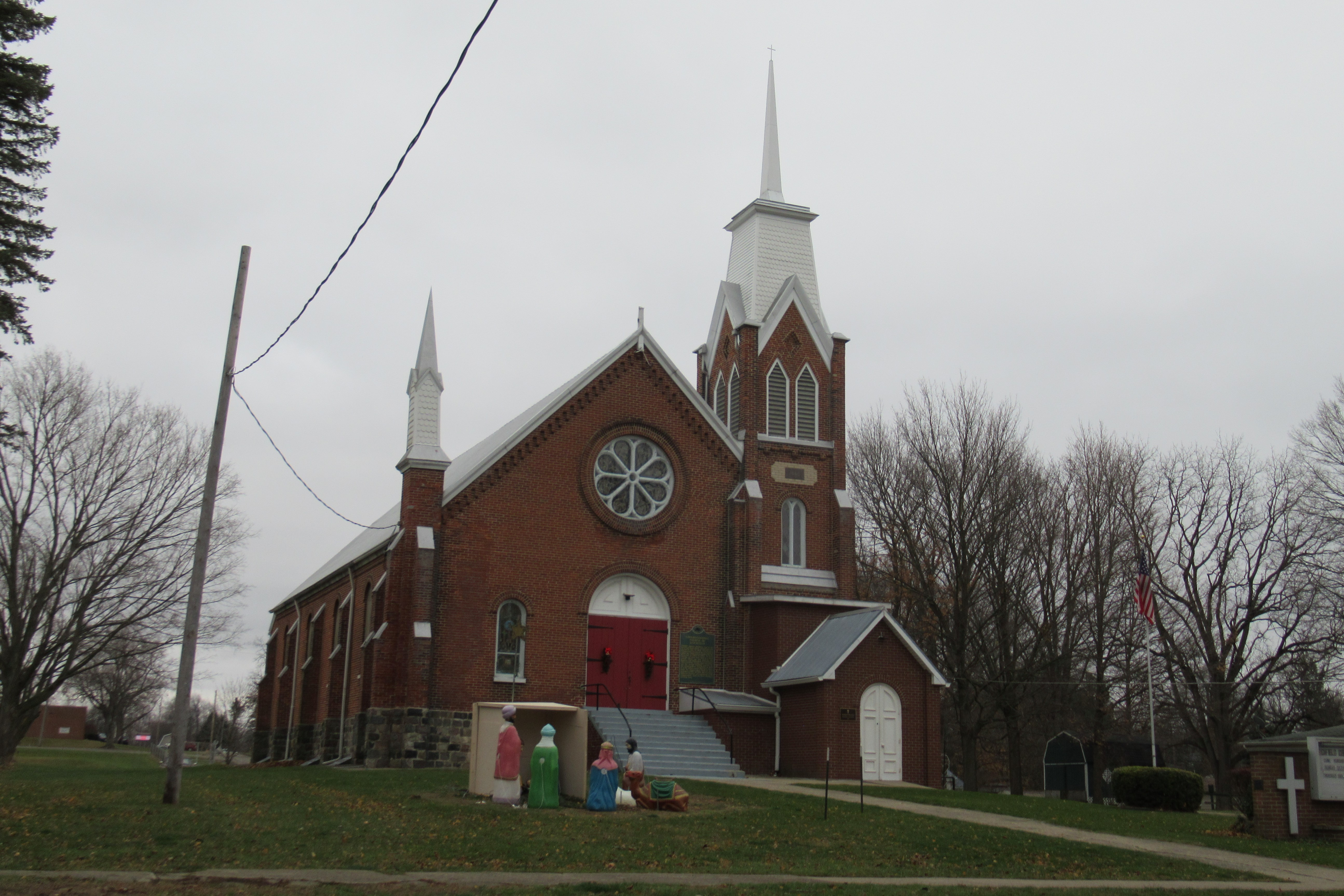
Congregational Church of Litchfield

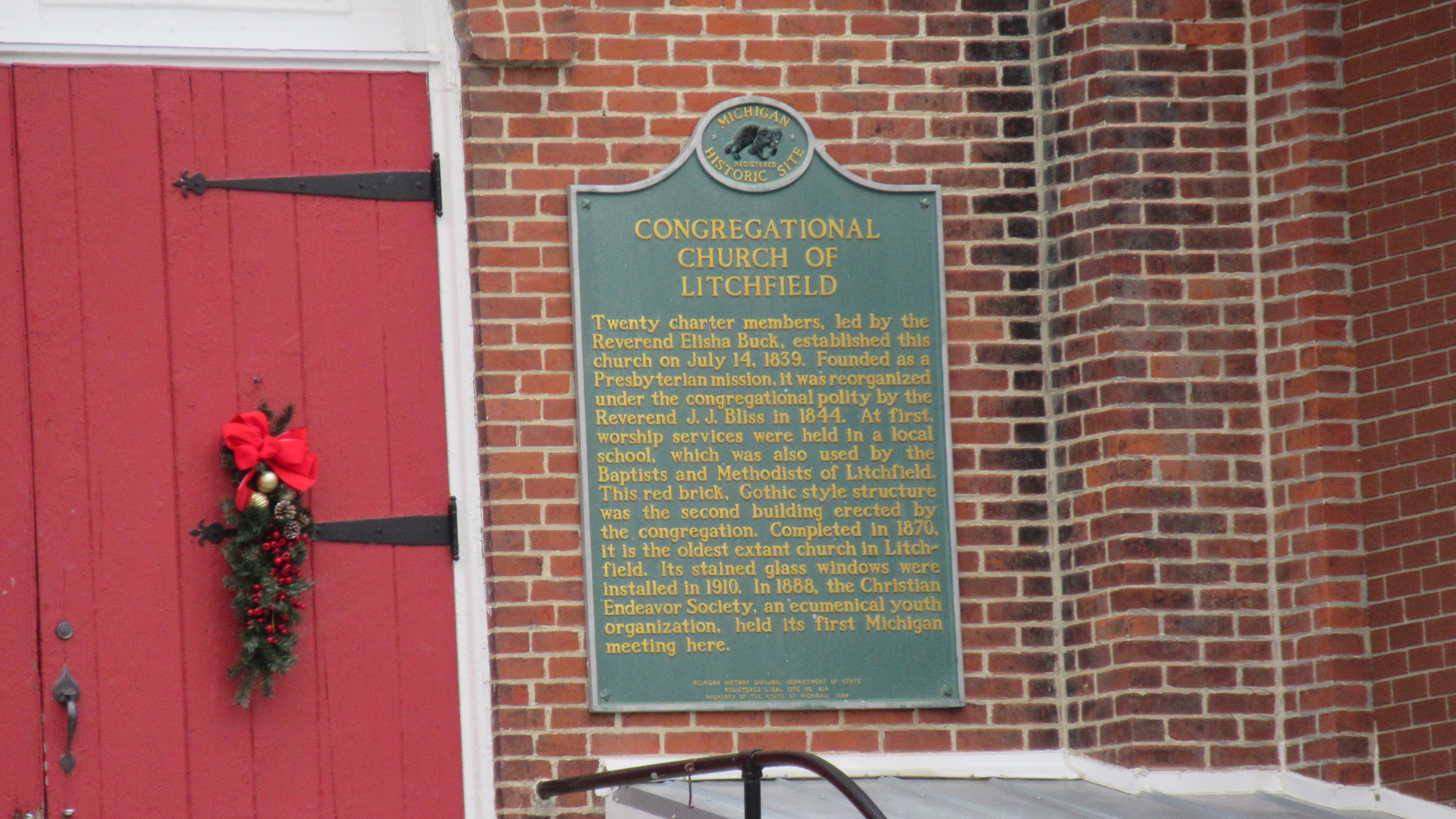
Congregational Church historic marker
