= WCSR =

WCSR may refer to:

- WCSR (AM), a radio station (1340 kHz) licensed to Hillsdale, Michigan, United States
- WCSR-FM, a radio station (92.1 MHz) licensed to Hillsdale
