= Michael Sessions =

Mayor of Hillsdale, Michigan
- In office 2005–2009
- Preceded by: Doug Ingles
- Succeeded by: Douglas Moon

Personal details
- Born: September 22, 1987 (age 39) Jonesville, Michigan
- Party: Independent

Michael Sessions (September 22, 1987) is the former mayor of Hillsdale, Michigan, United States, a city of about 8300 people. He was elected on November 8, 2005. He was sworn into office on November 21. Elected at the age of 18, he was among the youngest mayors in United States history.

== Campaign ==
Sessions' $700 war chest from his summer job was enough to fund a door-to-door, write-in campaign. Sessions was too young to be on the ballot in the spring of 2005, so a write-in campaign was the only option. The initial count showed that after 62 votes for Sessions were disqualified, Sessions still led incumbent mayor Doug Ingles by two votes (670–668).

In addition, Sessions was awarded one vote that had been in question by the elections office, which read simply "the 18 year old running for mayor", bringing the final margin to three votes. Ingles requested a recount, but withdrew the request at a special city council meeting.

On November 21, 2005, Sessions was sworn in as mayor of the city of Hillsdale. On the agenda for that night was an amendment to the current sign ordinance, an ordinance to set up a college zoning district, and the results of the 2005 city audit.

Sessions appeared on such shows as Judge Hatchett, Montel Williams, The NBC Today Show, Countdown with Keith Olbermann, The Ellen DeGeneres Show, and Late Show with David Letterman.

At the time of his election, Sessions received a $250 monthly stipend and said he would devote after-school hours to the job, while attending nearby Hillsdale High School during the day, and use his bedroom as his office. Sessions graduated from Hillsdale High School in May 2006 and began attending Hillsdale College thereafter. He belonged to the Delta Tau Delta fraternity.

Sessions appeared on the Late Show with David Letterman earlier in 2005 to read the Top Ten list titled "Good Things About Being an 18-year-old Mayor". Saturday Night Live parodied this event, with castmember Andy Samberg playing a caricatured version of Sessions as the mayor whose new laws would include "anyone who gives the mayor a 'swirlie' will be given the death penalty!" Sessions performed at least two marriages during his mayoralty.

In July 2007, Sessions pleaded no contest to two counts of computer hacking and completed 40 hours of community service.

In 2009, Sessions announced that he would not seek re-election because his graduation from Hillsdale College in 2010 might lead him to pursue a career outside the area.

Other 18-year-olds elected to mayoral positions the same year Sessions was elected were Christopher Seeley of Linesville, Pennsylvania (born September 1987) and Sam Juhl of Roland, Iowa (born November 1987).

== Personal life ==
On August 31, 2007, Sessions announced on-air at WCSR that he was suffering from testicular cancer. He had noticed an enlargement on July 24 and had the mass removed six days later. He added he would undergo dissection of his lymph nodes in September. Sessions chose not to seek re-election in 2009.

According to the Adrian Daily Telegram, Sessions is managing the Blissfield, Michigan Downtown Development Authority/ Main Street program.

== See also ==
- Age of candidacy
- Youth politics
- Youth rights
