= North Adams =

North Adams may refer to:

- North Adams, Massachusetts
- North Adams, Michigan
