= Adams Township, Hillsdale County, Michigan =

Adams Township, Michigan
- Civil township
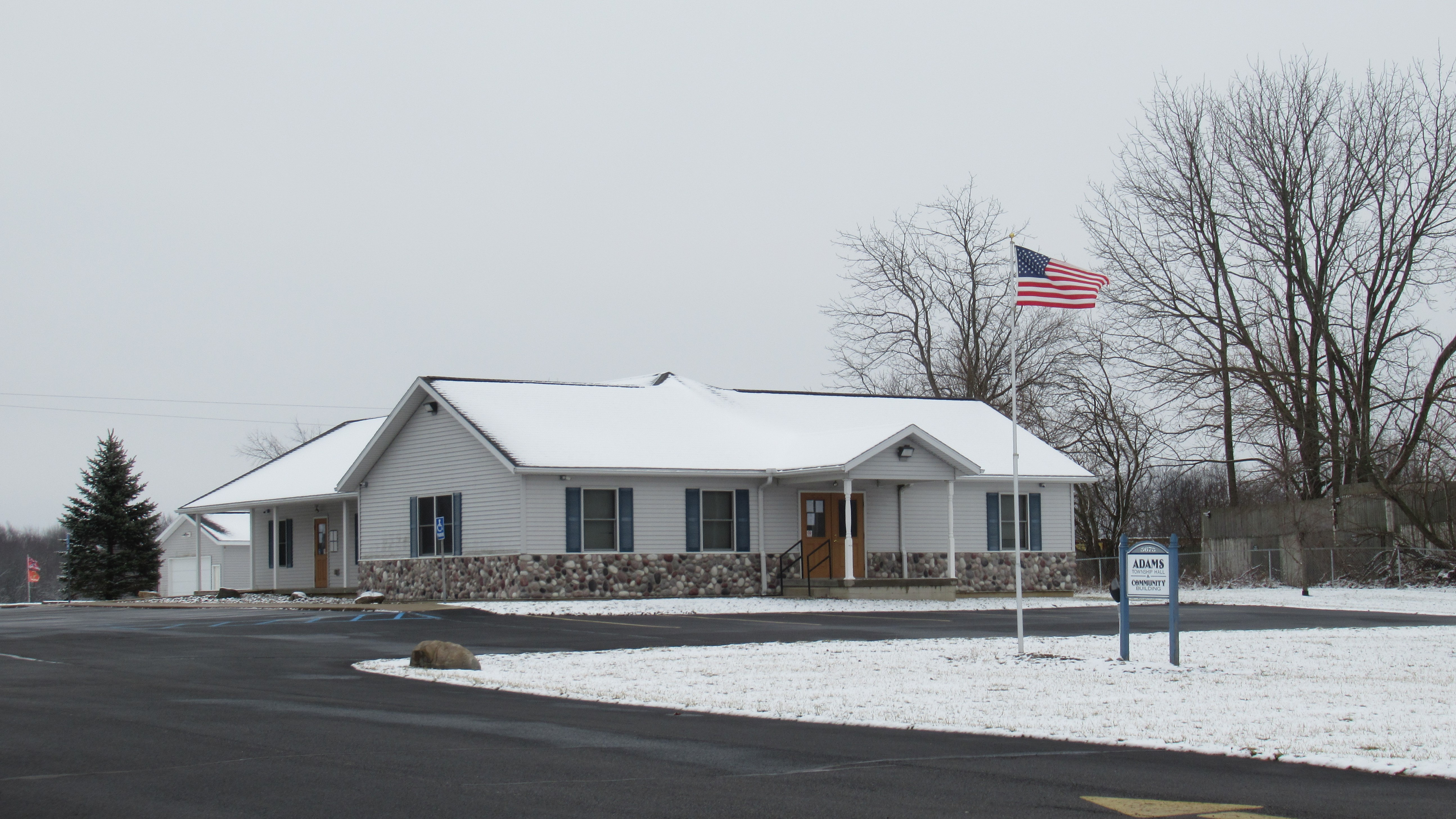
- Township Hall and Community Building

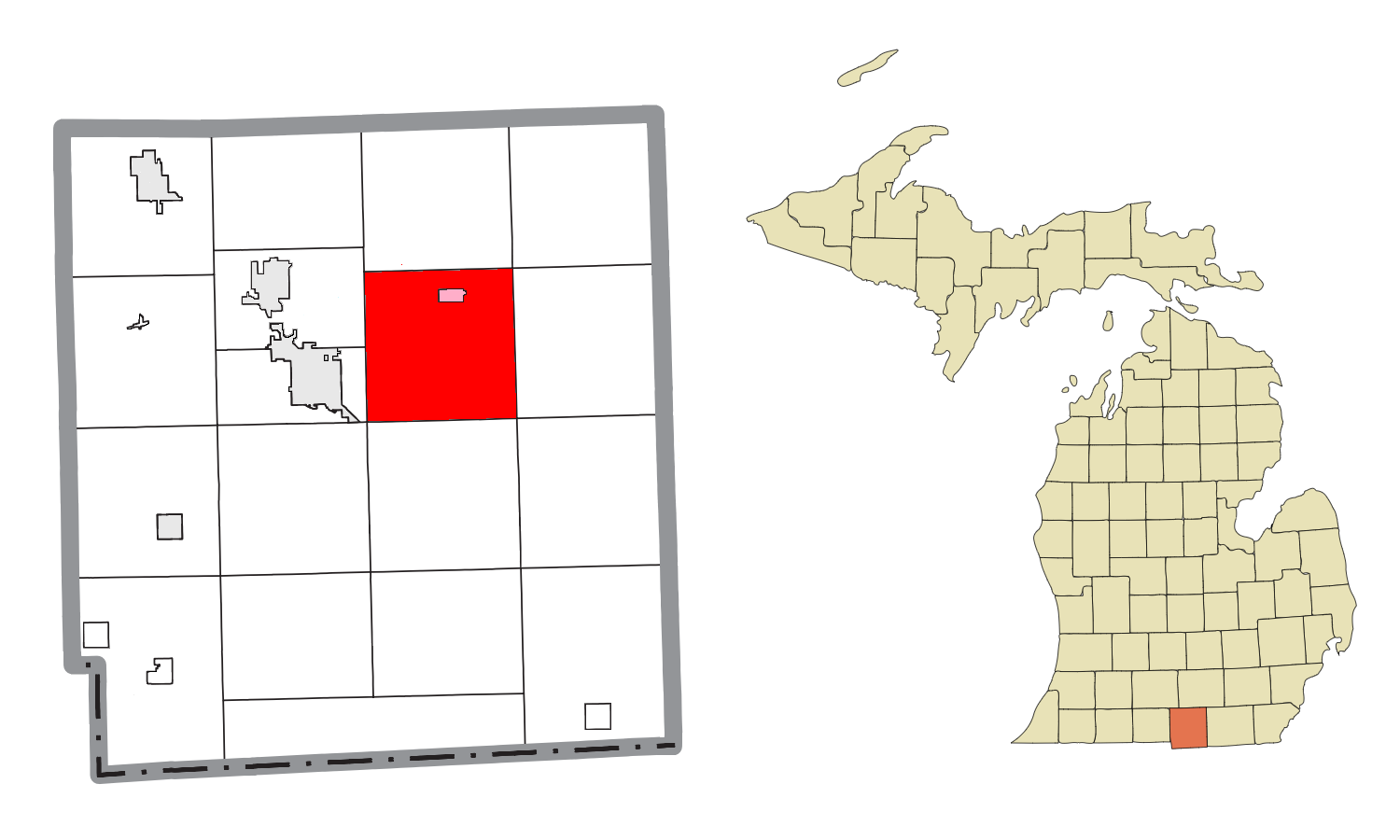
- Location within Hillsdale County (red) and the administered village of North Adams (pink)

- Location within the state of Michigan Location within the United States
- Coordinates: 41°56′30″N 84°32′04″W
- Country: United States
- State: Michigan
- County: Hillsdale
- Established: 1836

Government
  - Supervisor: Randy Johnson
  - Clerk: Suzy Roberts

Area
  - Total: 36.02 sq mi (93.29 km^{2})
  - Land: 35.64 sq mi (92.31 km^{2})
  - Water: 0.38 sq mi (0.98 km^{2})
- Elevation: 1,145 ft (349 m)

Population (2020)
  - Total: 2,262
  - Density: 63.5/sq mi (24.5/km^{2})
- Time zone: UTC-5 (Eastern (EST))
  - Summer (DST): UTC-4 (EDT)
- ZIP code(s): 49242 (Hillsdale); 49249 (Jerome); 49250 (Jonesville); 49262 (North Adams); 49266 (Osseo)
- Area code: 517
- FIPS code: 26-00300
- GNIS feature ID: 1625800
- Website: https://adamstownship.us/

Adams Township is a civil township of Hillsdale County in the U.S. state of Michigan. The population was 2,262 at the 2020 census.

== Communities ==
- North Adams is a village within the northern portion of the township at 41°58′19″N 84°31′27″W.

== History ==
Adams Township was organized from the southern half of Moscow Township in 1836, which itself was organized in 1835. The township was named after pioneering settler Henry Adams. Salmon Sharp served as the first township supervisor and first postmaster when the Adams post office opened on May 4, 1837. The Adams post office was transferred to North Adams on February 28, 1857.

== Geography ==
According to the U.S. Census Bureau, the township has a total area of 36.02 square miles (93.29 km^{2}), of which 35.64 square miles (92.31 km^{2}) is land and 0.38 square miles (0.98 km^{2}) (1.05%) is water.

The township contains the 181-acre (73 ha) Adams Township State Game Area. Hillsdale Municipal Airport is also located in the township just east of the city of Hillsdale.

== Demographics ==
As of the census of 2000, there were 2,498 people, 941 households, and 706 families residing in the township. The population density was 69.9 inhabitants per square mile (27.0/km^{2}). There were 1,036 housing units at an average density of 29.0 per square mile (11.2/km^{2}). The racial makeup of the township was 98.44% White, 0.52% African American, 0.16% Native American, 0.36% Asian, 0.12% from other races, and 0.40% from two or more races. Hispanic or Latino of any race were 1.28% of the population.

There were 941 households, out of which 32.9% had children under the age of 18 living with them, 63.7% were married couples living together, 6.9% had a female householder with no husband present, and 24.9% were non-families. 19.1% of all households were made up of individuals, and 8.0% had someone living alone who was 65 years of age or older. The average household size was 2.65 and the average family size was 3.03.

In the township the population was spread out, with 26.2% under the age of 18, 8.4% from 18 to 24, 27.1% from 25 to 44, 25.5% from 45 to 64, and 12.8% who were 65 years of age or older. The median age was 37 years. For every 100 females, there were 105.4 males. For every 100 females age 18 and over, there were 104.8 males.

The median income for a household in the township was $42,708, and the median income for a family was $45,739. Males had a median income of $32,481 versus $24,509 for females. The per capita income for the township was $19,821. About 2.2% of families and 5.4% of the population were below the poverty line, including 5.4% of those under age 18 and 7.7% of those age 65 or over.

== Education ==
Adams Township is served by four separate public school districts. The majority of the township is served by North Adams-Jerome Schools. The southeast corner of the township is served by Pittsford Area Schools to the southeast in Pittsford. The western portion of the township is served by Hillsdale Community Schools to the west in Hillsdale. A very small portion of the northwest corner of the township is served by Jonesville Community Schools to the west in Jonesville.
