= Hillsdale Downtown Historic District =

Historic district in Michigan, United States

- U.S. National Register of Historic Places
- U.S. Historic district
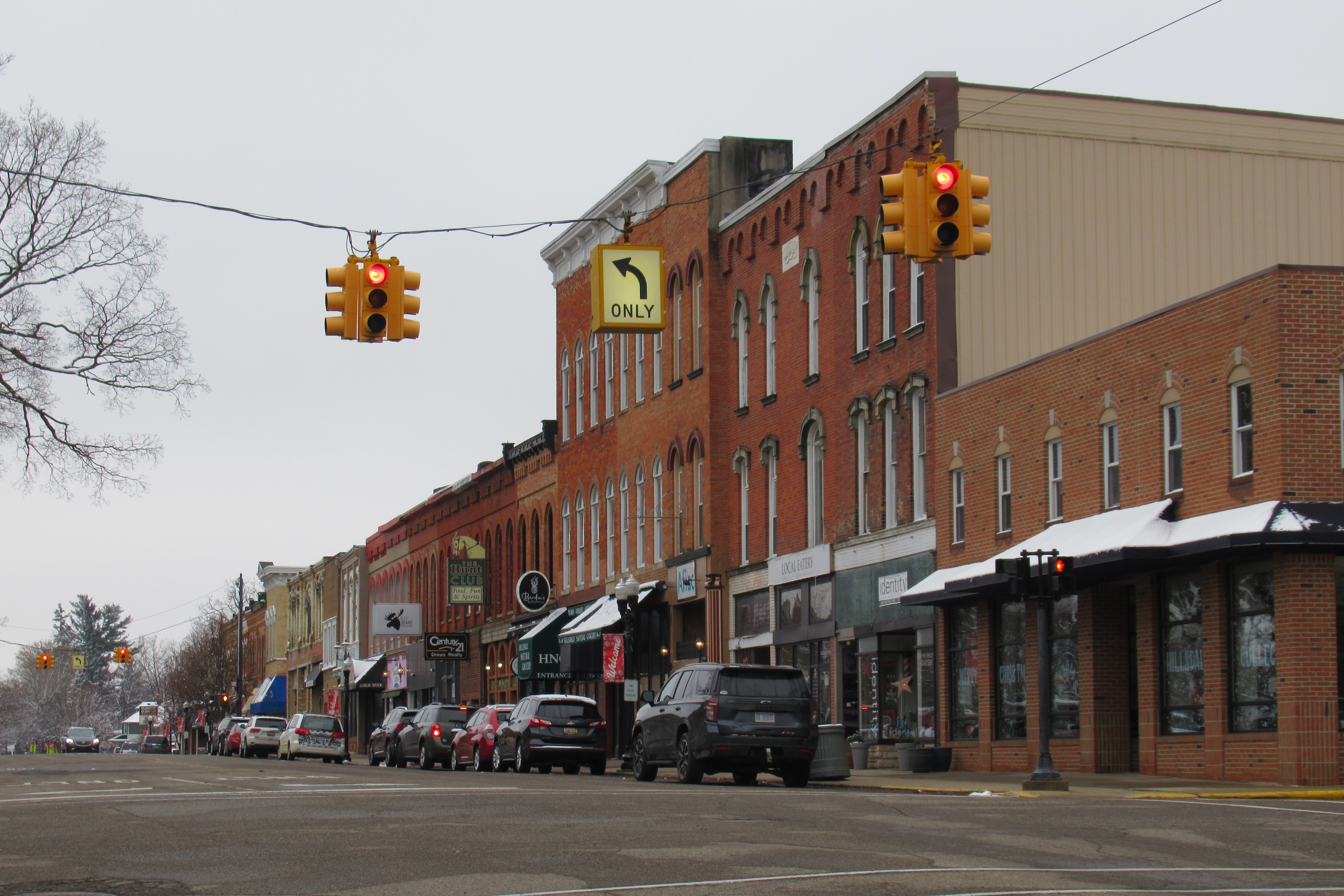
- Looking south along Howell Street

- Location within Michigan Location within the United States
- Interactive map
- Location: Roughly bounded by Ferris, Cook, E. Bacon, S. Howell, Waldron, N. Manning, Monroe and Hillsdale Sts. and Carlton Rd., Hillsdale, Michigan
- Coordinates: 41°55′18″N 84°37′54″W
- Area: 44 acres (18 ha)
- Architect: Claire Allen
- Architectural style: Classical Revival, Italianate, High Victorian Eclectic
- NRHP reference No.: 95000075
- Added to NRHP: February 17, 1995

The Hillsdale Downtown Historic District is a commercial historic district located in Hillsdale, Michigan and roughly bounded by Will Carleton Road to the north, Ferris Street on the east, Waldron Street on the south, and West Street on the west. It was listed on the National Register of Historic Places in 1995.

== History ==
The city of Hillsdale was established in 1839 and was designated the county seat of Hillsdale County in 1843. Since the 1840s, the section of the city covered by this district has been the commercial and civic heart of Hillsdale.

== Description ==
The Hillsdale Downtown Historic District contains 95 buildings constructed from the 1860s to the 1930s. These include structures associated with many of the city's oldest civic and commercial institutions, and structures that represent many of the broad trends in American and Midwestern architecture extant during Hillsdale's history.

Significant buildings in the district include the Hillsdale County Courthouse, the Hillsdale City Hall, post office, St. Anthony Catholic Church, St. Peter's Episcopal Church, First United Methodist Church, First Presbyterian Church, and the former rail depot.

== Images ==
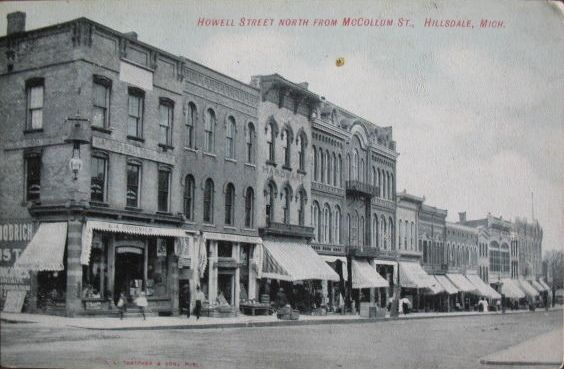
Howell and McCollum, ca. 1910

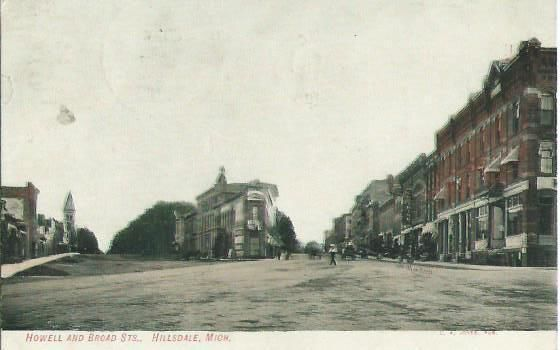
Howell and Broad, ca. 1908

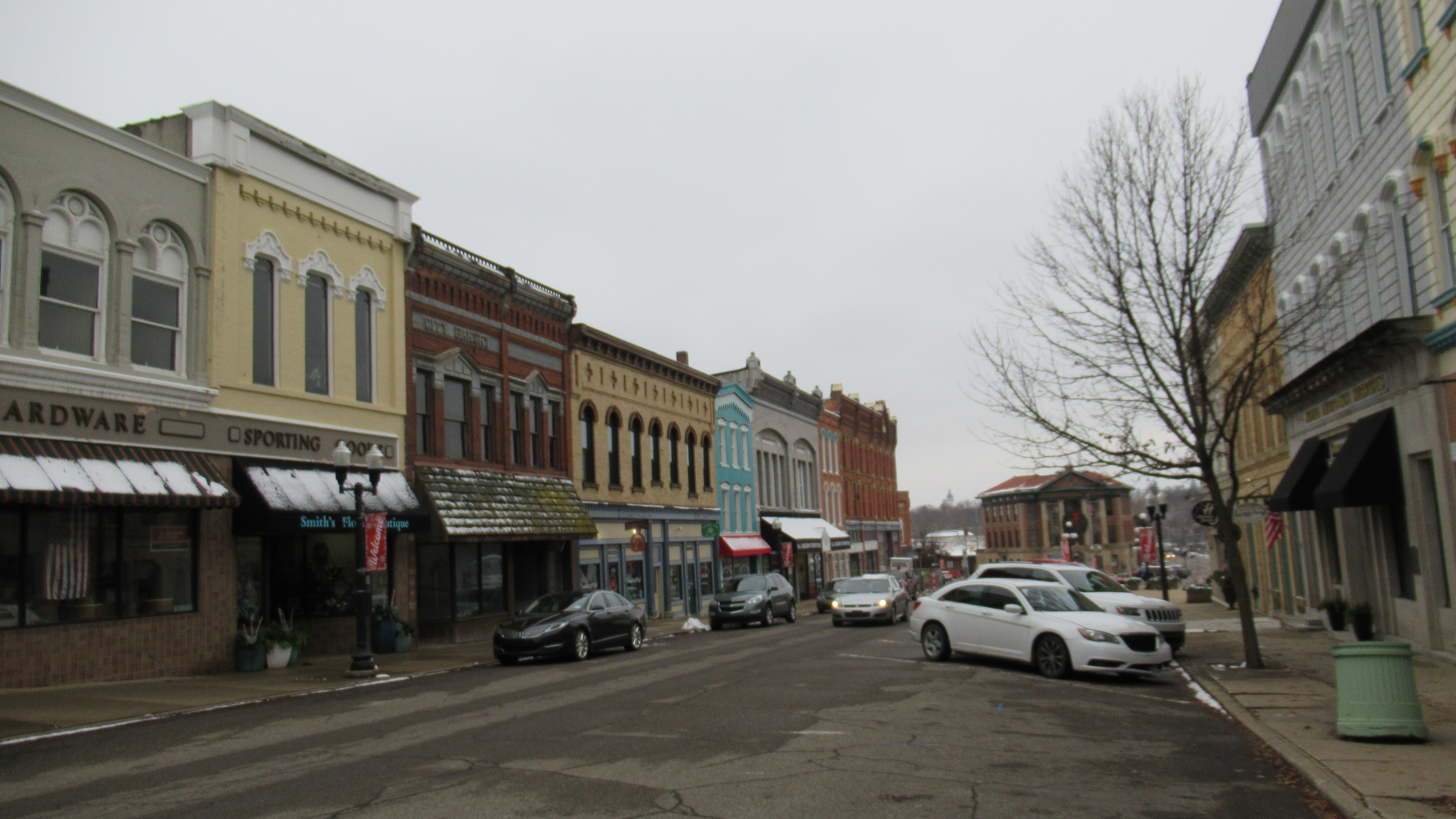
Northbound Howell Street in 2022
