= Hillsdale, Michigan =

- City
- City of Hillsdale
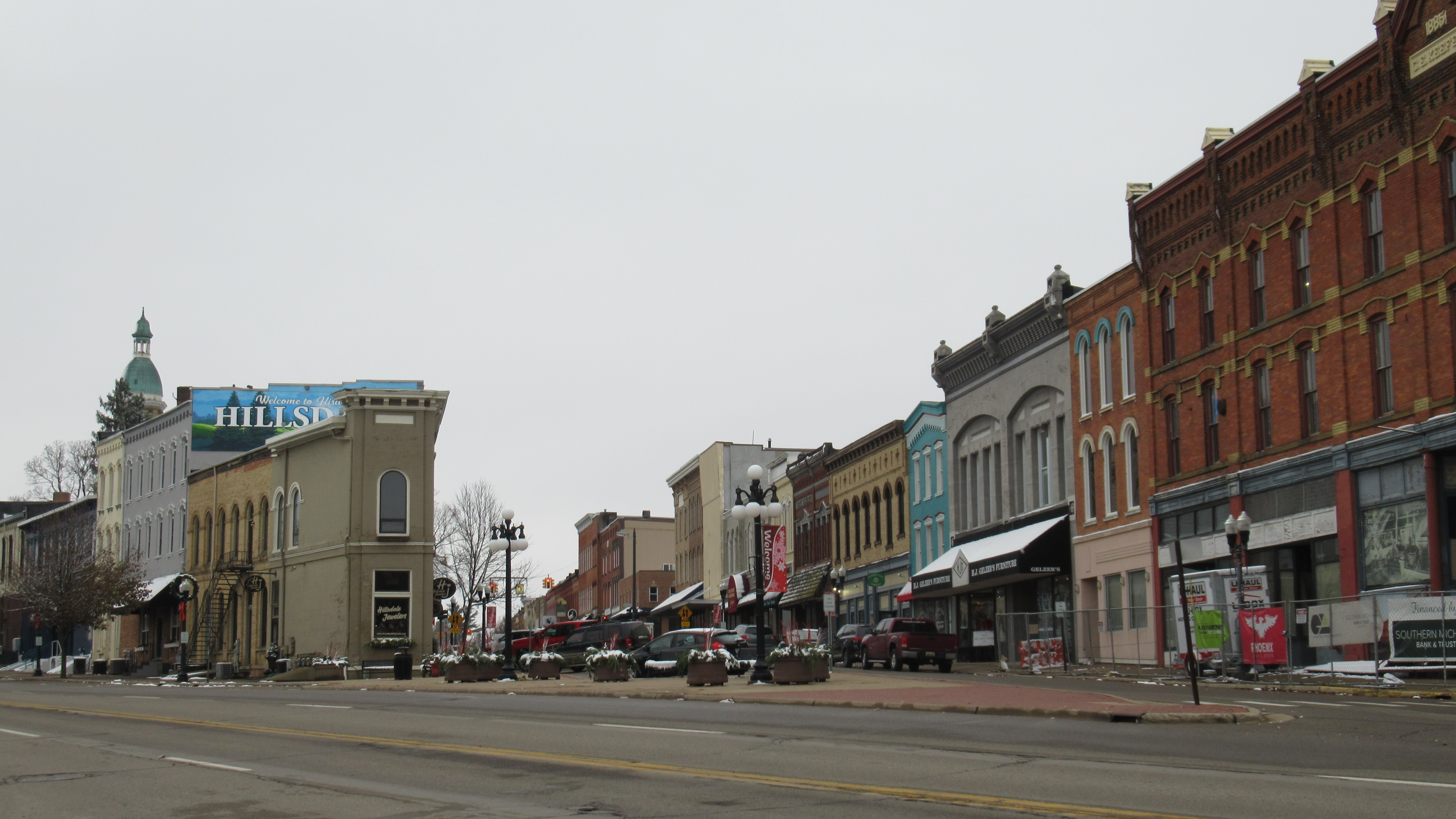
- Hillsdale Downtown Historic District

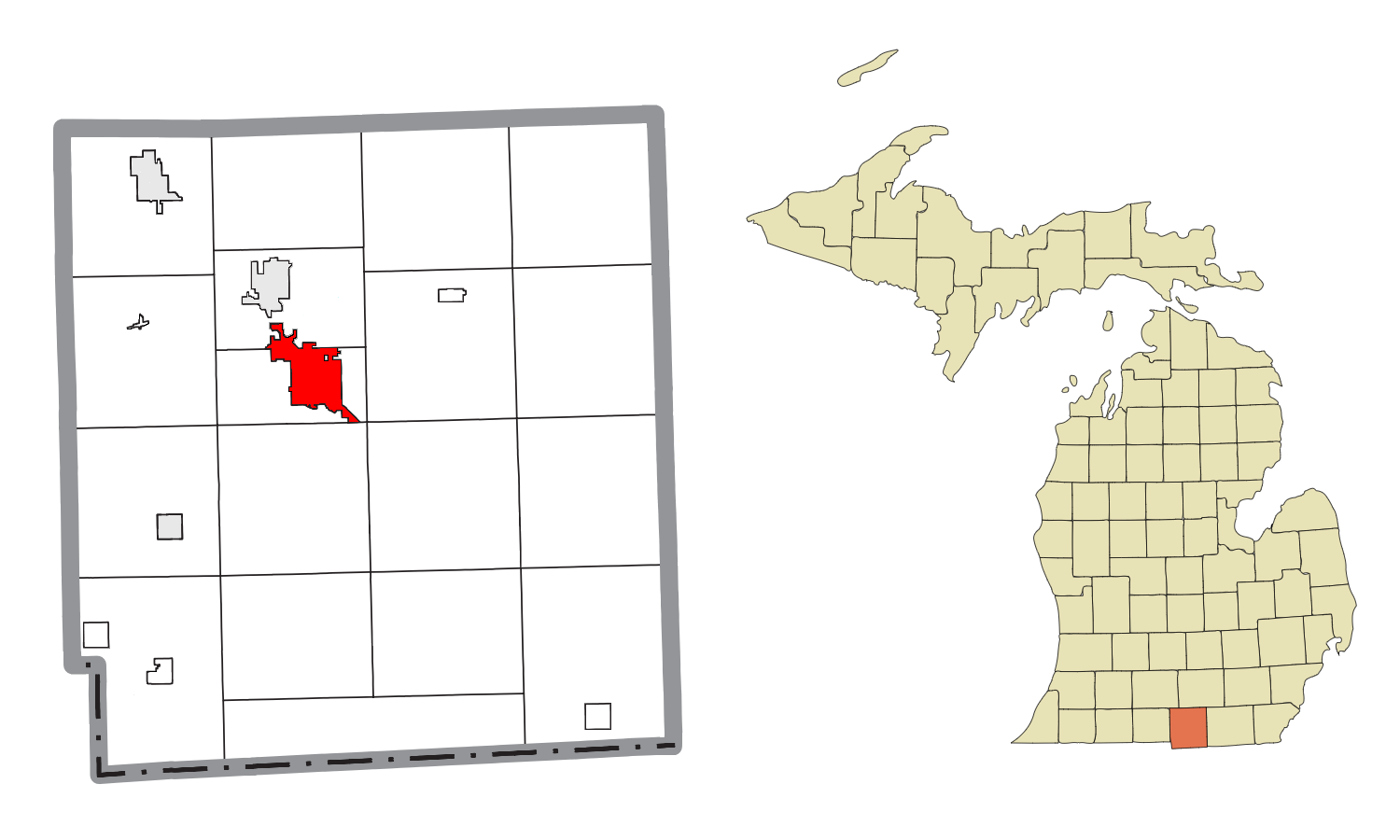
- Location within Hillsdale County

- Location within the state of Michigan Location within the United States
- Coordinates: 41°55′10″N 84°38′00″W
- Country: United States
- State: Michigan
- County: Hillsdale
- Settled: 1834
- Incorporated: 1847 (village); 1869 (city)

Government
  - Type: Council–manager
  - Mayor: Scott Sessions
  - Manager: David Mackie

Area
  - Total: 6.13 sq mi (15.88 km^{2})
  - Land: 5.69 sq mi (14.74 km^{2})
  - Water: 0.43 sq mi (1.11 km^{2})
- Elevation: 1,119 ft (341 m)

Population (2020)
  - Total: 8,036
  - Density: 1,412.3/sq mi (545.3/km^{2})
- Demonym: Hillsdalien
- Time zone: UTC-5 (Eastern (EST))
  - Summer (DST): UTC-4 (EDT)
- ZIP code(s): 49242
- Area code: 517
- FIPS code: 26-38460
- GNIS feature ID: 0628321
- Website: Official website

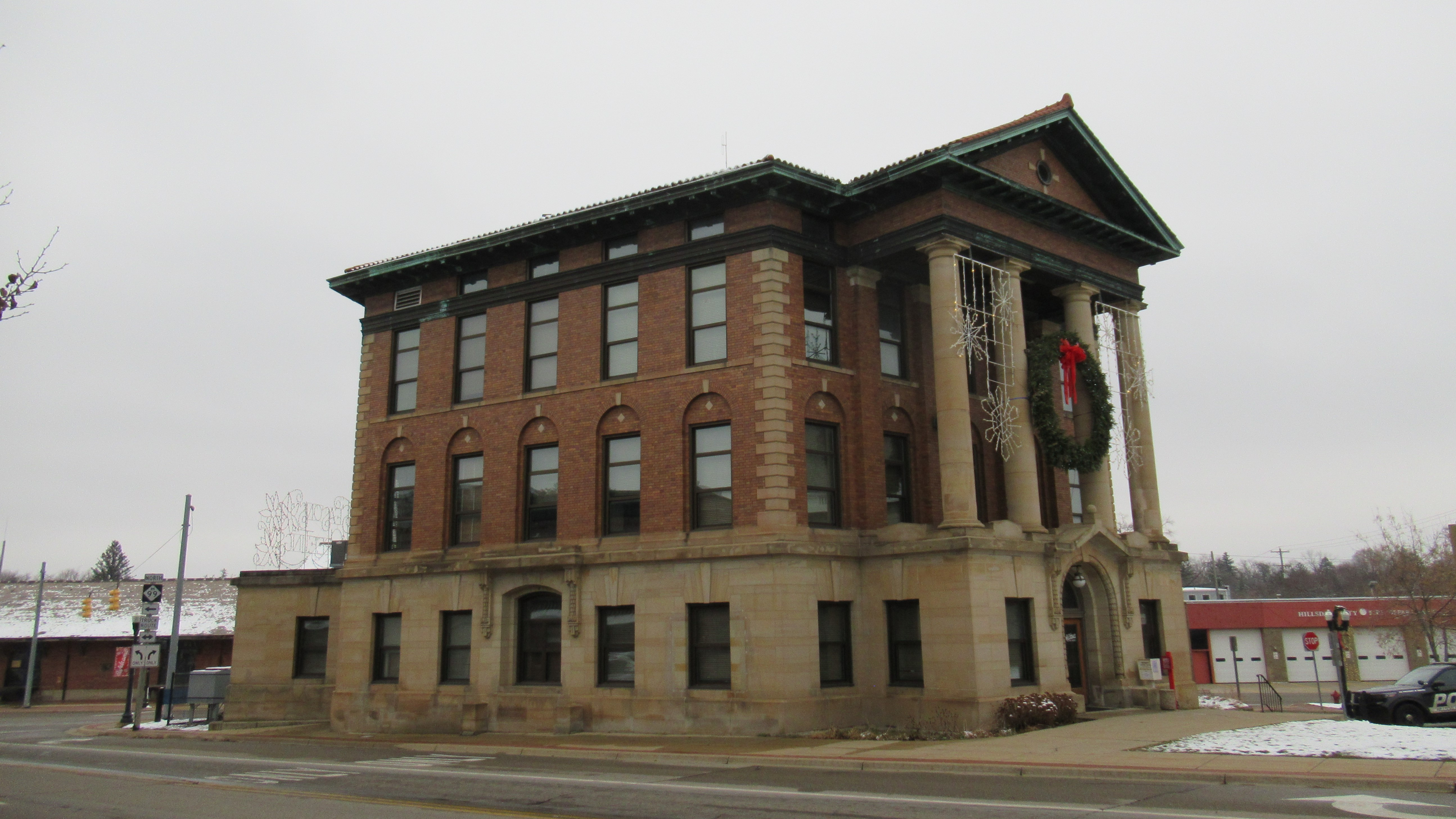
Hillsdale City Hall

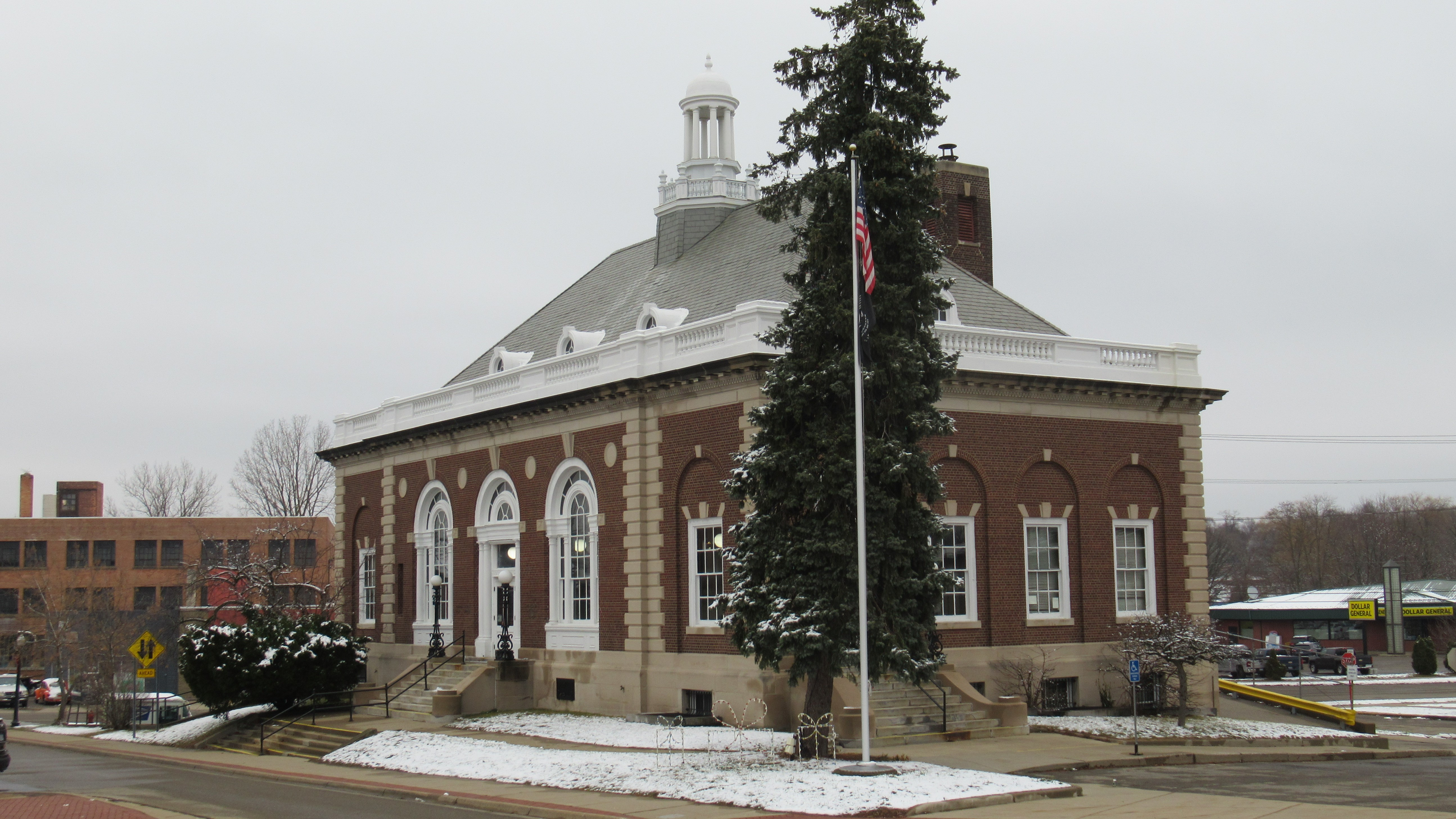
U.S. Post Office in Hillsdale

Hillsdale is the largest city in Hillsdale County, Michigan, United States, and its county seat. The population was 8,036 at the 2020 census. It is the home of Hillsdale College, a private liberal arts college.

== History ==
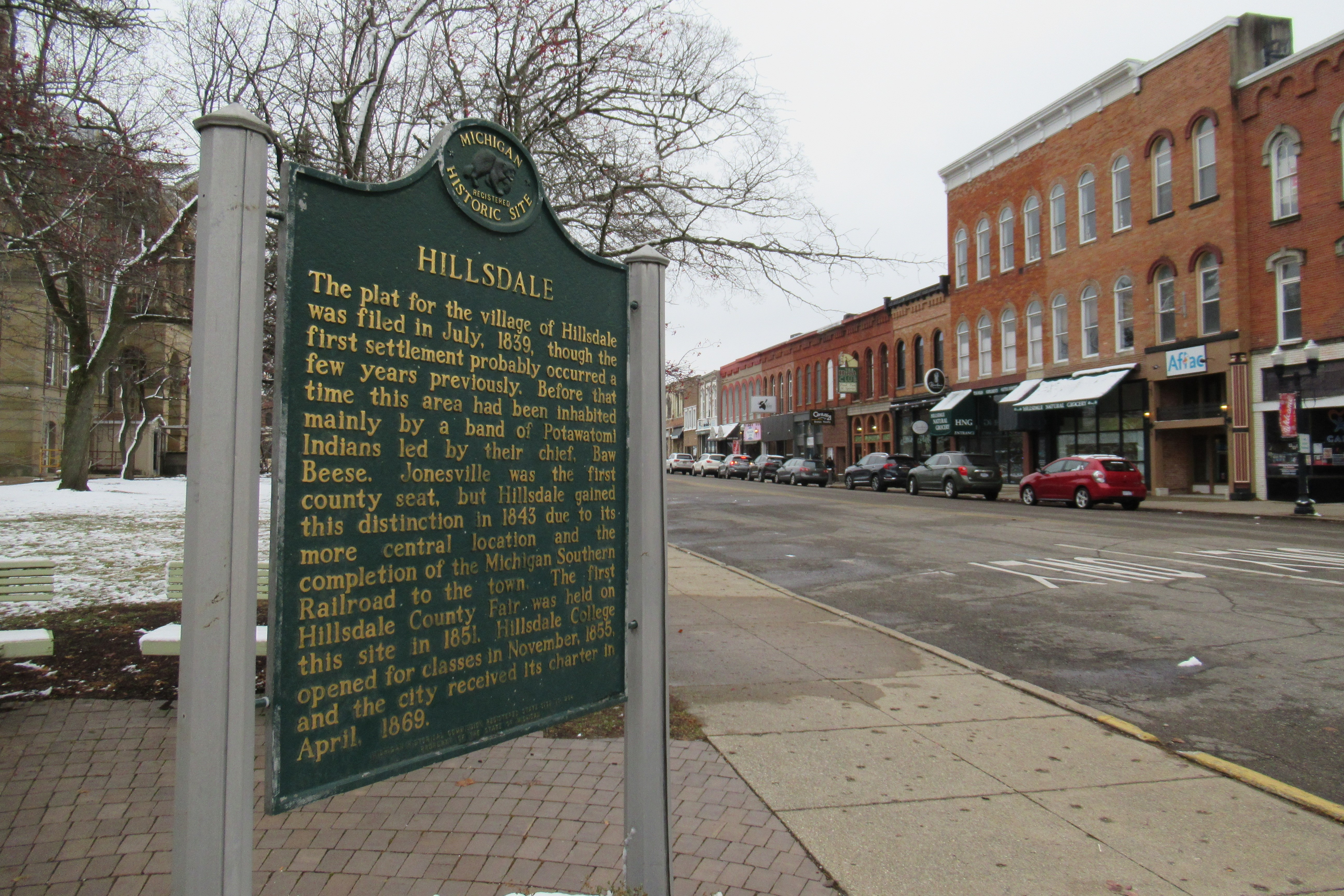
State historic marker along Broad Street next to the Hillsdale County Courthouse

This area is located in the rolling, fertile hills of South Central Michigan, bordering Indiana and Ohio, according to the boundaries set up under United States settlement. It was long occupied by the Potowatomi, an Algonquian-speaking people who were part of a long-term alliance, called the Council of Three Fires, with the Ojibwe and Odawa (Ottawa). A Potowatomi band of about 150 people, led by the chief known as Baw Beese, had a base camp near the large lake in the area.

The first European-American settler, Jeremiah Arnold, arrived in 1834 and encountered the band. They helped the early settlers. Arnold erected a cabin and moved in with his wife Percy (Round) Arnold. With the arrival of other settlers, the pioneers erected the first schoolhouse in 1838. Hillsdale was platted in 1839. In 1840, the US forced out Baw Beese and his people, as well as other Potowatomi in neighboring and more distant areas of Michigan, Indiana and Ohio, making them remove to Indian Territory in present-day Kansas.

Founded in 1844 as Central Michigan College in Spring Arbor, Hillsdale College relocated to this city in 1853 and changed its name. It was the first American college to prohibit in its charter discrimination based on race, religion or sex, and became an early force for the abolition of slavery. It was the second college in the nation to grant four-year liberal arts degrees to women.

The city was chartered in 1869. In 1885 Hillsdale dedicated its first high school building, on what is now West Street. (It is now used as the middle school.) In the late 1800s, Hillsdale became a booming railroad town, served by both freight and passenger trains.

The railroad was used by tourists to enjoy cottages and other facilities on Baw Beese Lake, named after the Potowatomi chief. About 20 minutes from downtown, the area was developed as a lake resort by the Lake Shore and Michigan Southern Railroad. People could avoid dusty travel on unpaved roads by taking the train. At the turn of the 20th century, it began to attract tourists from a wider range of cities, such as Chicago, Toledo, Elkhart and others at what had been known as Archer's Landing. People swam in the lake and could rent two types of canoes.

After World War II, the construction of interstate highways encouraged use of automobiles, and passenger traffic declined on many lines. Railroads had to restructure and the last passenger train left Hillsdale in 1956. Dozens of fine Victorian homes had been built during the prosperity of the 19th century, many of which are still occupied as private residences, contributing to the city's historic fabric.

The 20th century brought additional improvements. In 1908 the city opened its first public library. In 1921 it opened its first hospital and in 1934 Hillsdale Municipal Airport opened.

== Geography ==
According to the United States Census Bureau, the city has a total area of 6.13 square miles (15.88 km^{2}), of which, 5.69 square miles (14.74 km^{2}) is land and 0.43 square miles (1.11 km^{2}) is water.

The St. Joseph River begins in Hillsdale, flowing from Lake Baw Beese. Several parks and a beach are located around this major body of water in the city.

=== Climate ===
This climatic region is typified by large seasonal temperature differences, with warm to hot summers and cold winters. According to the Köppen Climate Classification system, Hillsdale has a humid continental climate, abbreviated "Dfb" on climate maps.

Climate data for Hillsdale, Michigan (1991–2020 normals, extremes 1891–present)
Month	Jan	Feb	Mar	Apr	May	Jun	Jul	Aug	Sep	Oct	Nov	Dec	Year
Record high °F (°C)	67 (19)	69 (21)	86 (30)	88 (31)	94 (34)	104 (40)	107 (42)	104 (40)	98 (37)	91 (33)	79 (26)	69 (21)	107 (42)
Mean daily maximum °F (°C)	30.6 (−0.8)	33.9 (1.1)	44.3 (6.8)	57.7 (14.3)	69.3 (20.7)	78.5 (25.8)	82.5 (28.1)	80.1 (26.7)	73.9 (23.3)	61.1 (16.2)	47.2 (8.4)	35.7 (2.1)	57.9 (14.4)
Daily mean °F (°C)	22.8 (−5.1)	25.1 (−3.8)	34.4 (1.3)	46.3 (7.9)	58.1 (14.5)	67.5 (19.7)	71.2 (21.8)	69.2 (20.7)	62.1 (16.7)	50.4 (10.2)	38.7 (3.7)	28.7 (−1.8)	47.9 (8.8)
Mean daily minimum °F (°C)	15.1 (−9.4)	16.4 (−8.7)	24.5 (−4.2)	35.0 (1.7)	46.8 (8.2)	56.5 (13.6)	59.9 (15.5)	58.3 (14.6)	50.3 (10.2)	39.6 (4.2)	30.1 (−1.1)	21.8 (−5.7)	37.9 (3.3)
Record low °F (°C)	−22 (−30)	−21 (−29)	−15 (−26)	3 (−16)	16 (−9)	31 (−1)	36 (2)	34 (1)	26 (−3)	15 (−9)	−4 (−20)	−19 (−28)	−22 (−30)
Average precipitation inches (mm)	2.77 (70)	2.25 (57)	2.40 (61)	3.68 (93)	4.56 (116)	3.91 (99)	3.62 (92)	3.93 (100)	3.58 (91)	3.43 (87)	2.97 (75)	2.44 (62)	39.54 (1,004)
Average snowfall inches (cm)	13.3 (34)	11.5 (29)	5.2 (13)	1.5 (3.8)	0.0 (0.0)	0.0 (0.0)	0.0 (0.0)	0.0 (0.0)	0.0 (0.0)	0.1 (0.25)	3.4 (8.6)	9.1 (23)	44.1 (112)
Average precipitation days (≥ 0.01 in)	14.7	11.6	11.3	14.0	13.7	11.7	10.1	11.1	10.4	12.8	12.5	13.7	147.6
Average snowy days (≥ 0.1 in)	10.5	8.3	4.3	1.0	0.0	0.0	0.0	0.0	0.0	0.1	2.9	7.8	34.9
Source: NOAA

== Demographics ==
Historical population
Census	Pop.	Note	%±
1850	1,067		—
1860	2,177		104.0%
1870	3,518		61.6%
1880	3,441		−2.2%
1890	3,915		13.8%
1900	4,151		6.0%
1910	5,001		20.5%
1920	5,476		9.5%
1930	5,896		7.7%
1940	6,381		8.2%
1950	7,297		14.4%
1960	7,629		4.5%
1970	7,728		1.3%
1980	7,432		−3.8%
1990	8,170		9.9%
2000	8,233		0.8%
2010	8,305		0.9%
2020	8,036		−3.2%
U.S. Decennial Census

=== 2020 census ===
As of the 2020 census, Hillsdale had a population of 8,036. The median age was 30.6 years. 21.5% of residents were under the age of 18 and 16.1% of residents were 65 years of age or older. For every 100 females there were 92.1 males, and for every 100 females age 18 and over there were 88.3 males age 18 and over.

97.4% of residents lived in urban areas, while 2.6% lived in rural areas.

There were 3,002 households in Hillsdale, of which 27.7% had children under the age of 18 living in them. Of all households, 33.9% were married-couple households, 21.9% were households with a male householder and no spouse or partner present, and 37.6% were households with a female householder and no spouse or partner present. About 40.5% of all households were made up of individuals and 17.5% had someone living alone who was 65 years of age or older.

There were 3,345 housing units, of which 10.3% were vacant. The homeowner vacancy rate was 1.6% and the rental vacancy rate was 8.1%.

Racial composition as of the 2020 census
Race	Number	Percent
White	7,363	91.6%
Black or African American	61	0.8%
American Indian and Alaska Native	23	0.3%
Asian	50	0.6%
Native Hawaiian and Other Pacific Islander	3	0.0%
Some other race	78	1.0%
Two or more races	458	5.7%
Hispanic or Latino (of any race)	245	3.0%

=== 2010 census ===
As of the census of 2010, there were 8,305 people, 2,970 households, and 1,686 families living in the city. The population density was 1,402.9 inhabitants per square mile (541.7/km^{2}). There were 3,383 housing units at an average density of 571.5 per square mile (220.7/km^{2}). The racial makeup of the city was 95.8% White, 0.7% African American, 0.4% Native American, 0.7% Asian, 0.3% from other races, and 2.0% from two or more races. Hispanic or Latino of any race were 2.3% of the population.

There were 2,970 households, of which 31.0% had children under the age of 18 living with them, 37.7% were married couples living together, 14.3% had a female householder with no husband present, 4.7% had a male householder with no wife present, and 43.2% were non-families. 36.4% of all households were made up of individuals, and 14.6% had someone living alone who was 65 years of age or older. The average household size was 2.35 and the average family size was 3.03.

The median age in the city was 30.2 years. 22.1% of residents were under the age of 18; 21.9% were between the ages of 18 and 24; 21.9% were from 25 to 44; 20.5% were from 45 to 64; and 13.6% were 65 years of age or older. The gender makeup of the city was 47.0% male and 53.0% female.

=== 2000 census ===
As of the census of 2000, there were 8,233 people, 3,067 households, and 1,781 families living in the city. The population density was 1,548.2 inhabitants per square mile (597.8/km^{2}). There were 3,274 housing units at an average density of 615.7 per square mile (237.7/km^{2}). The racial makeup of the city was 96.5% White, 0.6% African American, 0.5% Native American, 0.8% Asian, <0.1% Pacific Islander, 0.5% from other races, and 1.1% from two or more races. Hispanic or Latino of any race were 1.5% of the population.

There were 3,067 households, out of which 30.2% had children under the age of 18 living with them, 41.5% were married couples living together, 12.6% had a female householder with no husband present, and 41.9% were non-families. 34.6% of all households were made up of individuals, and 13.6% had someone living alone who was 65 years of age or older. The average household size was 2.33 and the average family size was 3.01.

In the city, the population was spread out, with 22.5% under the age of 18, 21.3% from 18 to 24, 24.7% from 25 to 44, 17.4% from 45 to 64, and 14.1% who were 65 years of age or older. The median age was 30 years. For every 100 females, there were 87.6 males. For every 100 females age 18 and over, there were 83.7 males.

The median income for a household in the city was $34,695, and the median income for a family was $42,649. Males had a median income of $32,573 versus $22,707 for females. The per capita income for the city was $16,062. About 5.5% of families and 10.3% of the population were below the poverty line, including 10.1% of those under age 18 and 15.7% of those age 65 or over.

== Education ==
The Hillsdale Community School District serves the city of Hillsdale. The school district is composed of one high school, Hillsdale High School, one middle school, Davis Middle School, and two elementary schools. A private school, Hillsdale Academy, and two charter schools, Will Carleton Academy and Hillsdale Preparatory School, also serve the city of Hillsdale. The town is also home to Hillsdale College.

=== Attempt to ban books at the Hillsdale library ===
In 2022, the Hillsdale Library Board met to discuss whether they should ban books created by and/or for LGBT people. Hillsdale's current acting mayor, Joshua Paladino, who at the time was a member of the library board and a graduate student at Hillsdale College, proposed removing several books and puzzles from the library's children's section for LGBT content and promotion of political activism. The proposed ban failed; the controversy led to the resignations of the library director, the children's library director and the president of the library board.

== Transportation ==
=== Major highways ===
- US 12 passes about 2 miles (3.2 km) north of Hillsdale
- M-99 run diagonally northwest through the center of the city

=== Airports ===
- Hillsdale Municipal Airport is a public use airport located just east of the city in Adams Township.

=== Railroad ===
- Indiana Northeastern Railroad has a railway line running through Hillsdale.

== Media ==
=== Radio ===
==== AM ====
- WCSR/1340 kHz

==== FM ====
- WPCJ/91.1 MHz
- WCSR-FM/92.1 MHz
- WRFH-LP/101.7 MHz
- WKMH-FM/102.5 MHz

=== Newspapers ===
- Hillsdale Daily News
- Imprimis, monthly speech digest of Hillsdale College
- The Collegian, student paper for Hillsdale College

== Notable people ==
- Lee Bartlett, three-time Olympic athlete
- Micah Beckwith, 53rd Lieutenant Governor of Indiana
- Baw Beese, Potawatomi chief
- Will Carleton (1845–1912), newspaper reporter and poet
- William W. Cook, legal scholar and benefactor of the University of Michigan Law School
- Charles Doolittle, Civil War general
- Sile Doty, thief, robber and burglar
- Dick Estell, host and producer of The Radio Reader
- Andrew Fink, Michigan State Legislature elected in 2020.
- Caril Ann Fugate, the youngest female in United States history to date to have been tried for first-degree murder
- Henry Churchill King, theologian, president of Oberlin College from 1902 to 1927
- Penny Neer, Olympic athlete
- John Corbett O'Meara United States District Court judge
- Jason Robards Sr., actor
- Michael Sessions, youngest mayor elected
- Rube Vickers, Major League baseball pitcher
- Henry Waldron, politician
- Frank "Muddy" Waters, Hall of Fame football coach
