= Emma Pow Bauder =

American evangelist, missionary and reformer

Rev. Emma Pow Bauder
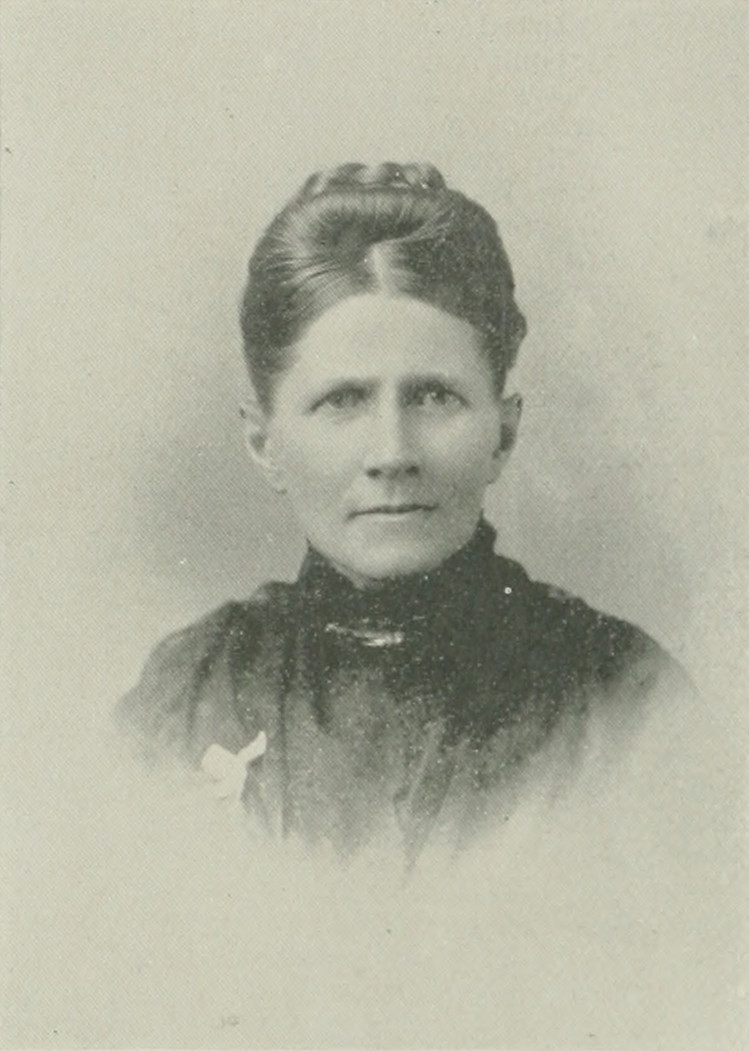
- Photo in A Woman of the Century

Personal life
- Born: Emma Pow Smith; March 11, 1848 North Adams, Michigan, U.S.
- Died: July 23, 1932 (aged 84) Oakland, California, U.S.
- Spouse: Name of first husband is unknown (married, 1867; divorced, ca. 1874); Thomas Jefferson Bauder (m. 1893; died 1911)
- Notable works: Chrysolyte; Anarchy

Religious life
- Religion: Church of the United Brethren in Christ
- Profession: evangelist; missionary; reformer; author
- Ordination: 1879

Rev. Emma Pow Bauder (née Smith; March 11, 1848 – July 23, 1932) was an American evangelist, missionary, reformer, and author. Affiliated with the Church of the United Brethren in Christ in Michigan since 1879. Soon thereafter, she relocated to the San Francisco Bay Area, where she was also active with the Woman's Christian Temperance Union (WCTU), the largest women's organization in the U.S. during the Gilded Age.

== Early life ==
Emma Pow Smith was born in North Adams, Michigan, March 11, 1848. She came from a long line of U.S. ancestry. Her father, John Henry Smith, M.D., (1814–1895) was born and raised in Royalton, New York, in which place he lived with his parents until he attained his majority. At the age of 24, he married Altha Mariah (née Brooks) (1820–1890), who was also had a long line of U.S. ancestry. In 1843, they emigrated from New York State and settled on a farm in the dense woods of Michigan, where their daughter Emma was born, the seventh child of a family of twelve. Smith Bauder's siblings were, George (b. 1835), Eliza (b. 1842), Mary (b. 1843), Harriett (b. 1845), Alonzo (b. 1846), Francis (b. 1846), Viola (b. 1851), Ella (b. 1853), Byron (b. 1856), Myron (b. 1856), and Carrie (b. 1863). As a child, she was eccentric and given to seeking seclusion and solitude. Even in childhood she seemed to have a reverence for God in nature.

== Career ==
During her religious career, Smith Bauder was affiliated with the United Brethren. Being converted in June 1879, she was licensed to preach shortly afterwards while in Doris, Michigan. Closing her dressmaking business, she went directly from Grand Rapids, Michigan, to California, where she worked for five years as a gospel missionary in San Francisco. Her missionary headquarters were located in the city's Barbary Coast district at the Silver Star House, corner of Pacific and Sansome streets. For seven years, she served as pastor of the Oakland Mission Church of the United Brethren. In 1901, she was appointed Conference Missionary of the United Brethren's California Conference.

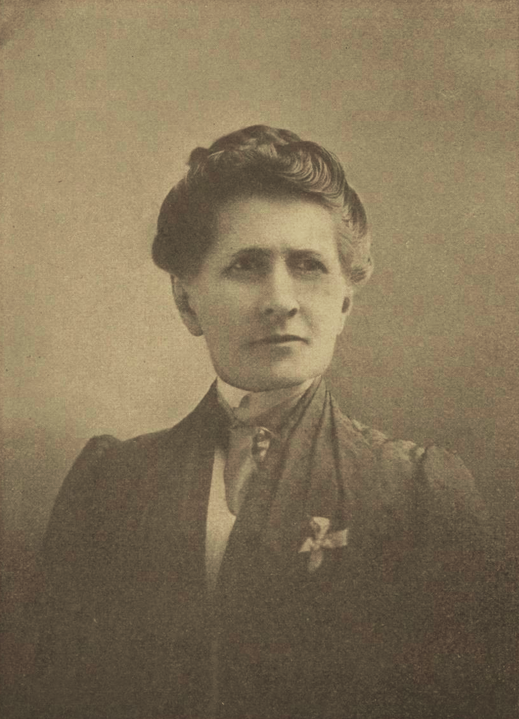
(1902)

In 1887, she was duly authorized and began her work in the field under the auspices of the WCTU. A young woman's WCTU branch existed for several years at Reno, Nevada, another at Carson City and a third at Elko. The children's Band of Hope was merged into the Loyal Temperance Legion, and several unions reported this branch of endeavor as part of their work. The most complete report of organization was that given by Smith Bauder in 1888. She delivered 100 addresses, added 300 members to the WCTU and organized 200 boys and girls into Loyal Temperance Legions. In May 1888, Smith Bauder was the opening speaker at the Nebraska WCTU's annual convention, returning in June, August, and October of that year, as guest lecturer in multiple cities on behalf of the WCTU. She was also sponsored by the WCTU as a visiting lecturer in Texas. At the Sixth Annual Convention of the WCTU of Contra Costa County, in Antioch, California in 1890, Smith Bauder resigned her position as County Superintendent of Young Women's Work. In 1892, at the Thirteenth Annual Convention of the WCTU of California, her title was changed from State Organizer to State Evangelist. That year, her temperance work took her to Lake, Humboldt, Mendocino, and Shasta counties.

Among her literary and poetical productions was Chrysolyte. Others included Jets of truth, or, Revolutionary spokes in the wheel of progress. : a book devoted to truth, temperance and reform and "for God, and home, and native land.", Ruth and Marie: A Fascinating Story of the Nineteenth Century, Anarchy; its cause and cure, and The Inhabitants of Two Worlds.

In 1910, Smith Bauder served as Chaplain, a National Officer position of the Woman's Prohibition Club of America.

== Personal life ==
Smith Bauder was twice married. In April 1867, she married a man who proved to be an alcoholic. After seven unhappy years, she divorced him and regained her maiden name. In Sacramento, California, on December 14, 1893, she married Thomas Jefferson Bauder (1839–1911), who was then a resident of Fresno, California while she was a resident of Pacific Grove, California. Rev. T. J. Bauder was pastor of the United Brethren Church in Sacramento before becoming the presiding elder of United Brethren California Conference.

For 32 years, Rev. Emma Pow Smith Bauder made her home in Oakland, California, where she died July 23, 1932. (Note: VIAF and Baym (2012) indicate 1901 as Bauder's year of death, while her cemetery record and obituary article use 1932.)

== Selected works ==
Anarchy; its cause and cure

=== Novels ===
- Emma Pow Smith, Jets of truth, or, Revolutionary spokes in the wheel of progress. : a book devoted to truth, temperance and reform and "for God, and home, and native land.", 1886
- Emma Pow Smith, Chrysolyte, 1891 (text)
- Emma Pow Bauder, Ruth and Marie: A Fascinating Story of the Nineteenth Century, 1895 (text)
- Emma Pow Bauder, Anarchy; its cause and cure, 1902 (text)
- Emma Pow Bauder, The Inhabitants of Two Worlds, 1904 (text)

=== Musical compositions ===
- "Y. Bells", lyrics by Emma Pow Smith, music by Flora H. Cassel, 1890
- "When the Girls can Vote", lyrics by Emma Pow Smith, music by M. H. Evans, 1890
- "Nobody cares", lyrics by E. P. Bauder, music unknown, 1911
