= Hillsdale Municipal Airport =

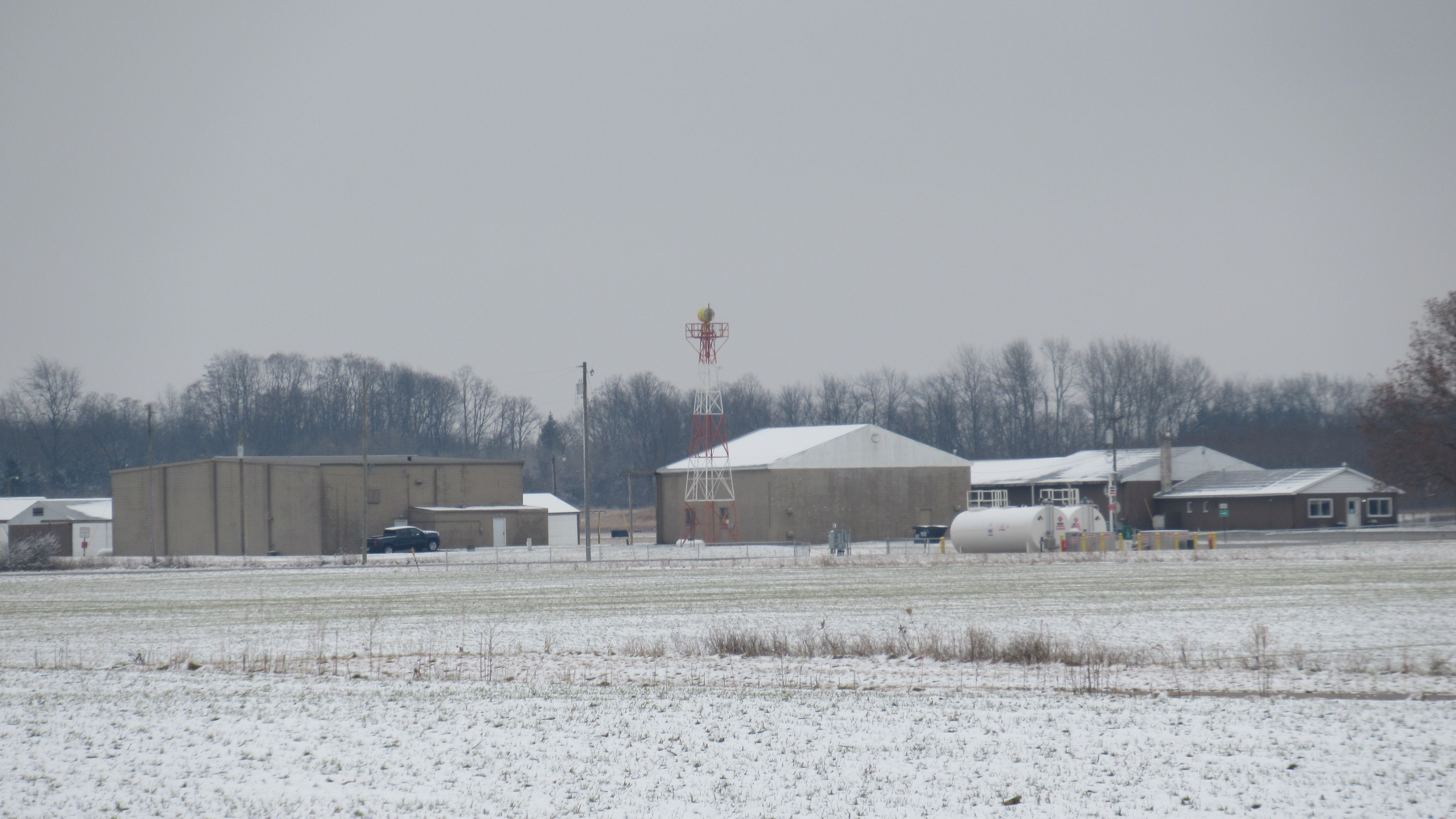
- IATA: none; ICAO: KJYM; FAA LID: JYM

Summary
- Airport type: Public
- Owner: City of Hillsdale
- Serves: Hillsdale, Michigan
- Elevation AMSL: 1,184 ft (361 m)
- Coordinates: 41°55′17″N 084°35′09″W
- Website: www.hillsdaleairport.com

Map
- Location of airport in Michigan JYM (the United States)

Runways
Direction	Length		Surface
Direction	ft	m	Surface
10/28	5,000	1,219	Asphalt

Statistics (2021)
- Aircraft operations: 9,855
- Based aircraft: 13
- Source: Federal Aviation Administration

Hillsdale Municipal Airport (ICAO: KJYM, FAA LID: JYM) is a public use airport located three nautical miles (6 km) east of the central business district of Hillsdale, in Hillsdale County, Michigan, United States. It is included in the Federal Aviation Administration (FAA) National Plan of Integrated Airport Systems for 2017–2021, in which it is categorized as a local general aviation facility.

The airport is accessible by road from Entrance Road and is located near M-99.

Although most U.S. airports use the same three-letter location identifier for the FAA and IATA, this airport is assigned KJYM by the ICAO.

== History ==
The first airport in Hillsdale was known as Robards' Field. A new airport was built in 1934 in an attempt to attract transcontinental flights who could land there instead of in Detroit or Chicago. This new airport hosted the Kiwanis Club’s first Fly-In on Aug. 10, 1948, which attracted 60 aircraft from around the midwest.

The second airport fell toward disrepair in the 1950s. Amid a dwindling economy, only the Hillsdale Aviation Club kept the airport running. Requests to the government to keep the airport running went unanswered.

The land on which the second airport sat was sold in 1960, and it became the Hillsdale Industrial Park. New land was purchased for a larger airport, and the modern airport opened in 1963. The first airport manager was a former flight engineer at Eastern Airlines.

The airport has been cited as a major source of traffic for the surrounding area, which is not connected by any major highways. It supports traffic into Hillsdale College as well as business traffic and recreational pilots.

== Facilities and aircraft ==
=== Facilities ===
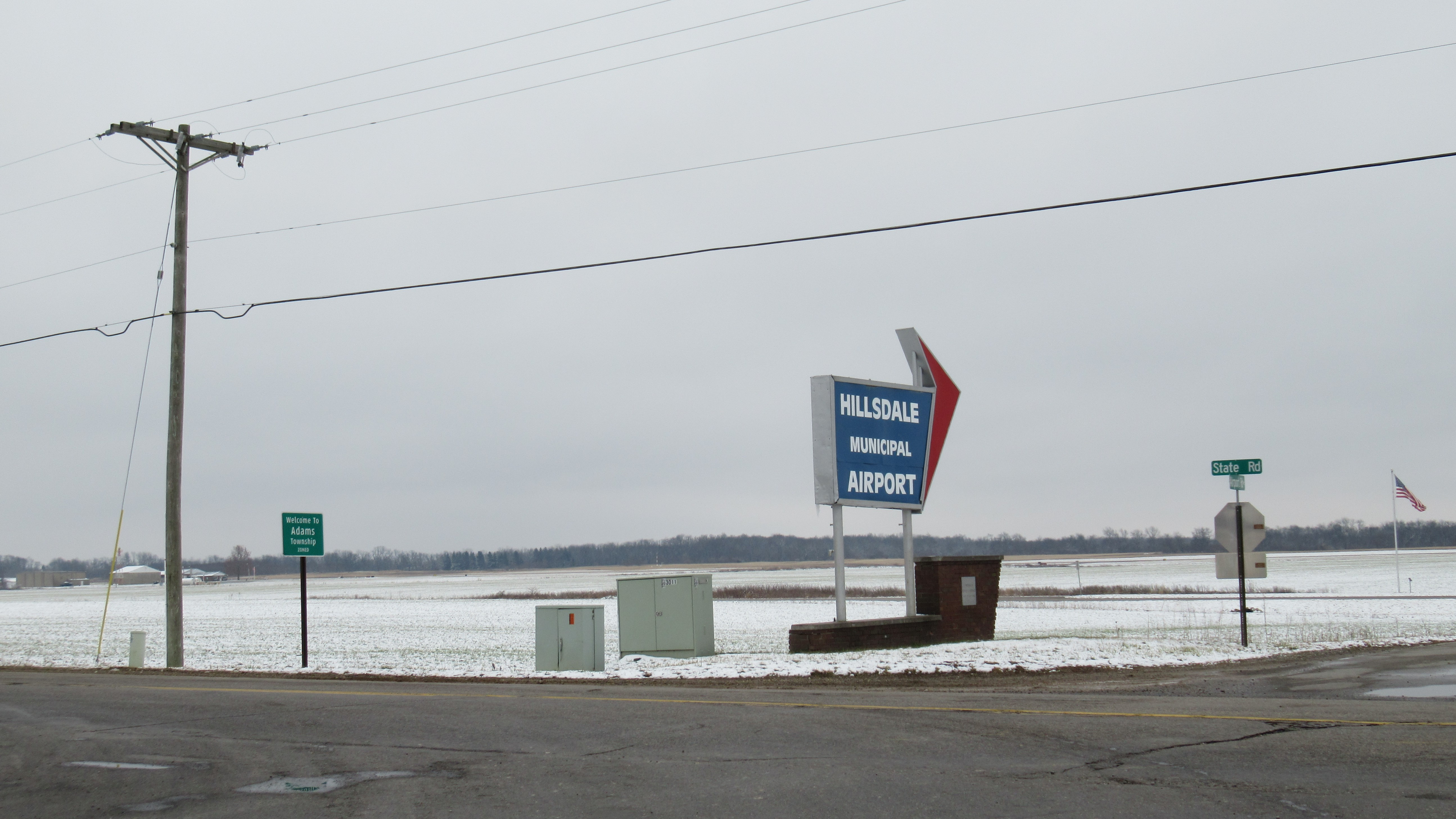
Entrance along State Road

Hillsdale Municipal Airport covers an area of 585 acres (237 ha) at an elevation of 1,184feet (360 m) above mean sea level. It has one runway designated 10/28 with an asphalt surface measuring 5,000 by 100 feet (1,524 x 30 m).

Since 2015, the airport has plans for a variety of upgrades to make the airport more easily navigable. This includes adding and expanding taxiways to connect runways with the airport's terminal, fuel farm, and hangars.

As of May 2022, studies are being conducted to determine the need and best locations for a new terminal at the airport. When the old terminal can be demolished, it will be replaced with new taxiways to provide space for parallel taxiways to support full-length runway departures.

The airport is staffed 12 months a year 8am-4:30pm Monday through Friday, 8am - 12:00pm Saturday and closed on Sundays. The terminal and fuel can be accessed 24 hours a day.

=== Aircraft ===
For the 12-month period ending December 31, 2021, the airport had 9,855 general aviation aircraft operations, an average of 27 per day. At that time there were 13 aircraft based at this airport: 12 single-engine airplanes and 1 jet.

== Accidents and incidents ==
- On August 10, 2006, a Flight Design CTSW was damaged during a hard landing at Hillsdale Municipal Airport. The pilot, who had just finished an hour of dual instruction in the aircraft, reported he touched down hard, bounced, and touched down hard a second time, at which point the nose landing gear bent and the plane went off the side of the runway. The broken nose gear became stuck in the grass and the aircraft nosed over. The probable cause was found to be the pilot's misjudged flare, resulting in a hard landing, and his improper recovery from the bounced landing, which resulted in the overload failure of the nose landing gear and subsequent nose over.
- On June 24, 2007, an Aeronca 7EC Champion crashed on landing at Hillsdale. At the end of the landing roll, a gust of wind pushed the tail of the airplane left. The pilot applied brakes to avoid hitting a runway marker, but he applied too much brake at the tail came over, the prop struck, and the plane became inverted. The probable cause was found to be the pilot's failure to maintain aircraft control during the rollout.
- On November 21, 2012, a Piper Cherokee impacted trees and terrain while on approach to Hillsdale. The pilot had flown to Ohio to have lunch before returning to Hillsdale at sunset. Another pilot who had landed soon before reported hazy conditions but that the pilot controlled lighting was visible from at least 5 miles away. The probable cause was found to be the pilot's failure to maintain clearance from terrain during a straight-in night visual flight rules approach to land in hazy weather conditions.

== See also ==
- List of airports in Michigan
