= WCSR-FM =

- Hillsdale, Michigan; United States
- Frequency: 92.1 MHz
- Branding: Radio Hillsdale

Programming
- Format: Full-service adult contemporary
- Affiliations: Detroit Lions Radio Network

Ownership
- Owner: McKibbin Media Group, Inc.
- Sister stations: WCSR

History
- First air date: 1973
- Call sign meaning: "Community Service Radio"

Technical information
- Licensing authority: FCC
- Facility ID: 71298
- Class: A
- ERP: 6,000 watts
- HAAT: 74 meters (243 ft)
- Transmitter coordinates: 41°55′41″N 84°38′9″W

Links
- Public license information: Public file; LMS

WCSR-FM is a radio station located in Hillsdale, Michigan. It broadcasts on 92.1 MHz with 6,000 watts ERP. WCSR-FM is owned by McKibbin Media Group, Inc.

== History ==
In 1973, WCSR (1340 AM) added an FM sister station: WCSR-FM 92.1.

Effective February 27, 2020, WCSR, WCSR-FM, and translator W258DE were sold by WCSR, Inc. to McKibbin Media Group for $675,000. On February 28, 2020, WCSR AM and W258DE split from its simulcast with WCSR-FM and changed formats to country, branded as "99.5 The Dale".

== Format ==
WCSR-FM's programming is varied, and is best described as the format once known as "full service". Much of the day's airtime is devoted to local news and discussions relating to it, including full local newscasts at the top of each hour.

WCSR-FM airs public interest programs, including the weekday morning "Community Spotlight," a local feature for non-profits to highlight their events. Other notable programs include the daily broadcasts of Michigan Ag Today, the "Pet Rescue" animal lost and found program (which, from time to time, may feature the occasional farm animal) and the Saturday "The County Extension Report," which is a service of the Michigan State University Hillsdale County Extension Office. On Sundays, a variety of religious programming can also be heard.

The station is also home of Hillsdale College Charger and Hillsdale High School Hornet athletics, mainly football and men's basketball, and is a member of the Detroit Tigers, Detroit Lions and Motor Racing Network radio networks. The station also airs a variety of sporting events from Hillsdale County's several local public and private schools.

The music the station plays is a Greatest Hits format, and Sunday mornings are home to the long-time "Big Band Sunday" music block. During evening and weekend dayparts, the station airs Westwood One's Variety Pop format via satellite.

== Sources ==
- Michiguide.com - WCSR-FM History
