= Hillsdale County Courthouse =

- U.S. National Register of Historic Places
- Michigan State Historic Site
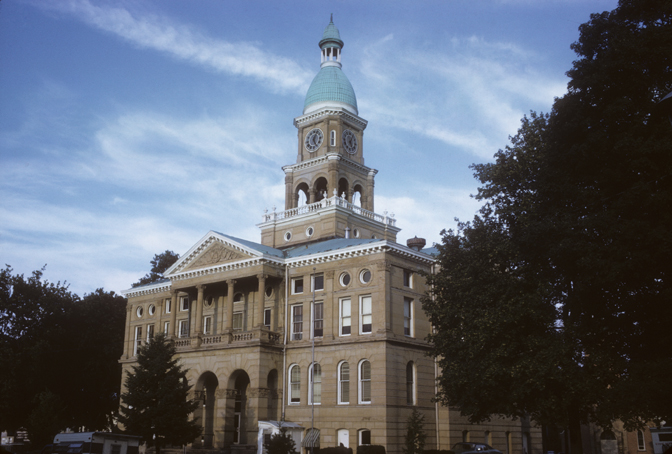

- Location within Michigan Location within the United States
- Interactive map showing the location of Hillsdale County Courthouse
- Location: 29 N. Howell St, Hillsdale, Michigan
- Coordinates: 41°55′14″N 84°37′54″W
- Area: 2.2 acres (0.89 ha)
- Built: 1898
- Built by: Geake and Henry
- Architect: Claire Allen
- Architectural style: Renaissance Revival
- NRHP reference No.: 82002835

Significant dates
- Added to NRHP: August 11, 1982
- Designated MSHS: April 10, 1969

The Hillsdale County Courthouse is a government building located at 29 North Howell Street in Hillsdale, Michigan. It was designated a Michigan State Historic Site in 1969 and listed on the National Register of Historic Places in 1982.

== History ==
Hillsdale County was set off from Lenawee County in 1829. The original county seat, Jonesville, was chosen in 1831. In 1839, the more centrally located Hillsdale began agitating for the seat, and in 1843 the state legislature agreed. A temporary structure was erected as a courthouse on this site; it was soon followed by a 30 feet (9.1 m) by 50 feet (15 m) frame structure. That structure burned in 1849, and a new sandstone courthouse was completed by early 1851.

By 1887, it was recognized that a new courthouse was necessary. However, voters did not approve the funds necessary until 1898, when $45,000 was allocated for this building. The county hired Claire Allen of Jackson to design the building and Geake and Henry of Fort Wayne, Indiana to construct it. Construction occurred over 1898-99, and the building was dedicated on September 6, 1899.

A clock was added to the clock tower in 1909, and was refurbished in 1985.

== Description ==
The Hillsdale County Courthouse is a three-story yellow sandstone Renaissance Revival structure. Its hip roof is surmounted with a copper-roofed cupola. A pedimented portico covers the main entrance.
