= North Adams, Michigan =

- Village
- Village of North Adams
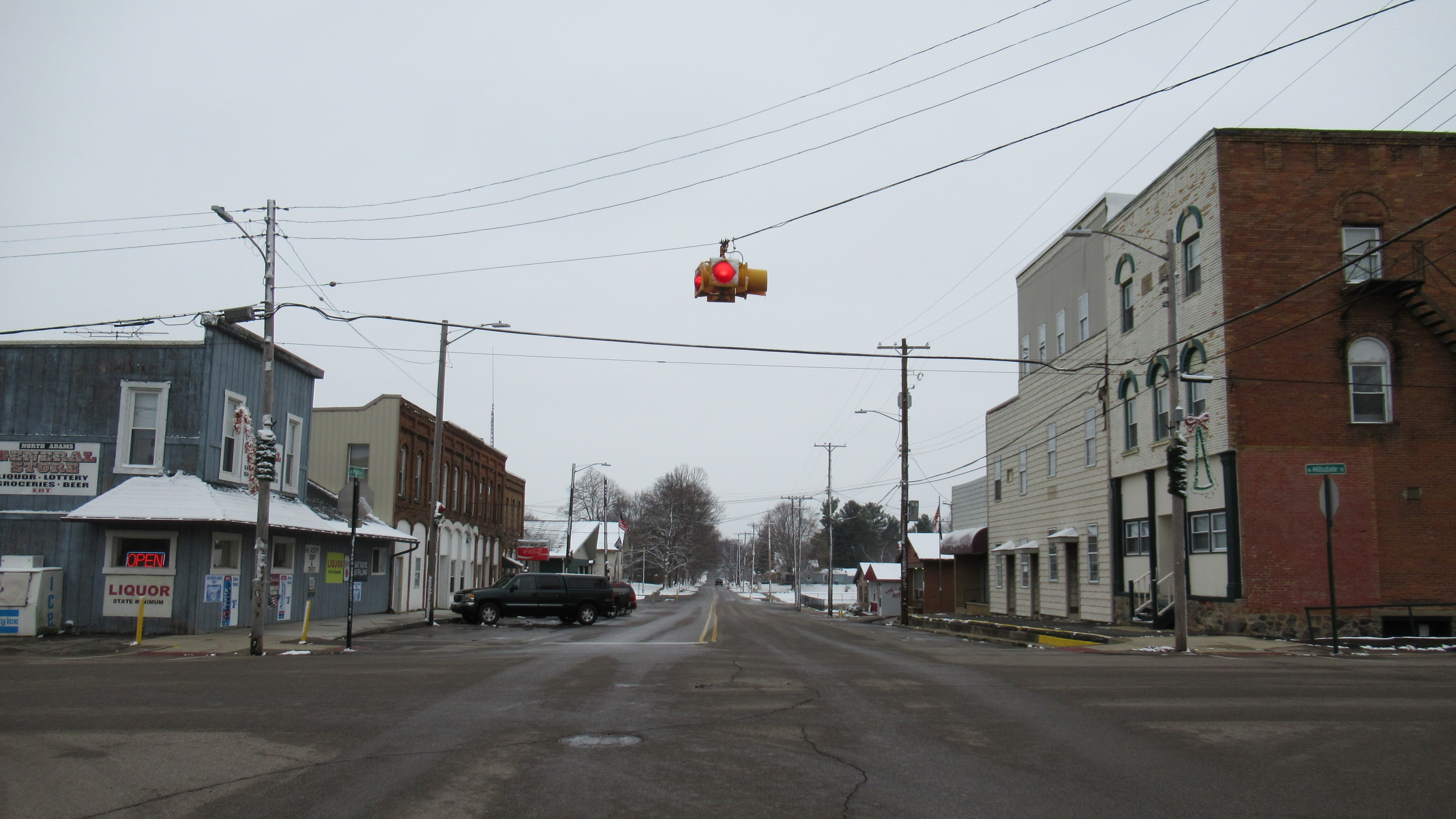
- Looking north along Hillsdale Street

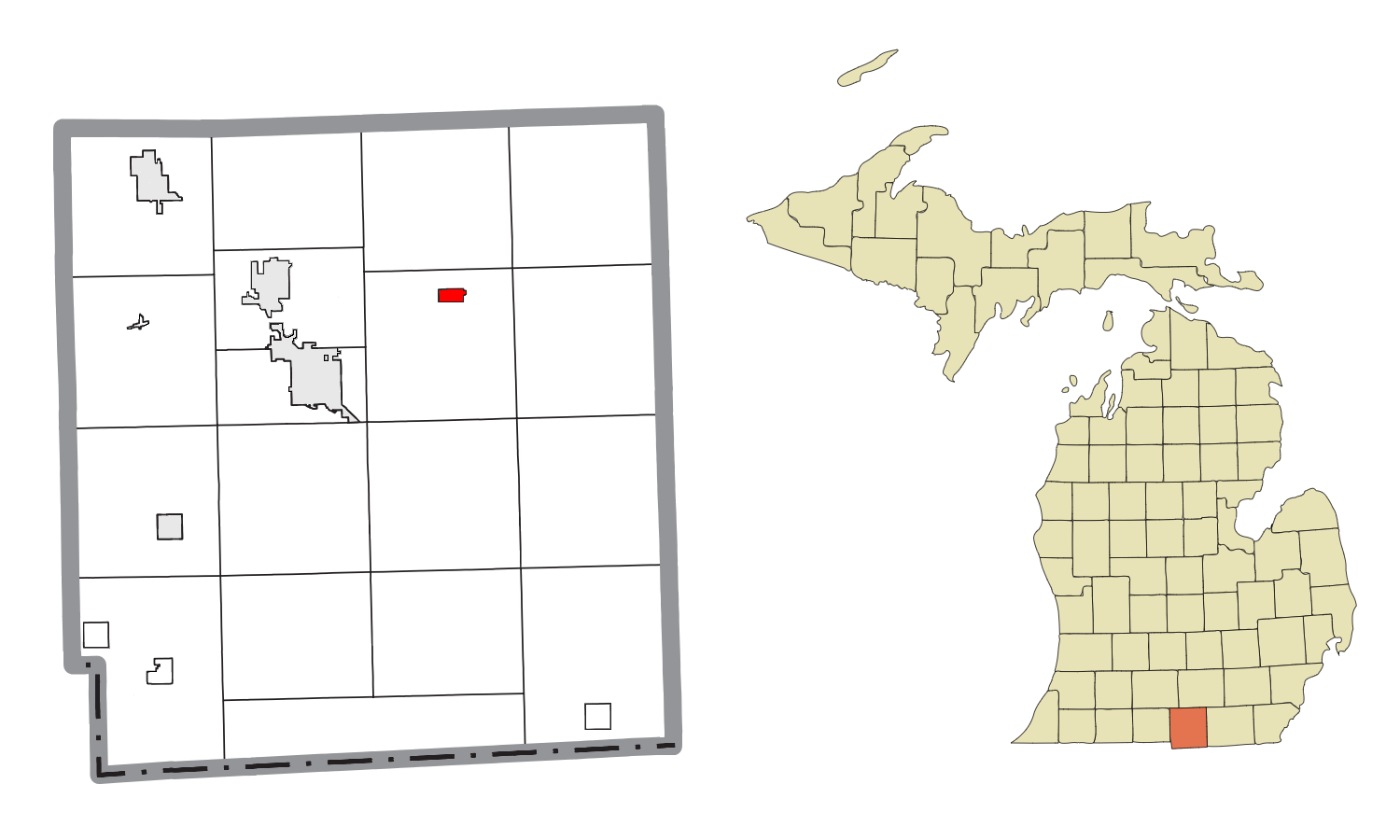
- Location within Hillsdale County

- Location within the state of Michigan Location within the United States
- Coordinates: 41°58′19″N 84°31′27″W
- Country: United States
- State: Michigan
- County: Hillsdale
- Township: Adams
- Settled: 1835
- Platted: 1871
- Incorporated: 1881

Government
  - Type: Village council
  - President: Richard Beach

Area
  - Total: 0.53 sq mi (1.37 km^{2})
  - Land: 0.53 sq mi (1.37 km^{2})
  - Water: 0 sq mi (0.00 km^{2})
- Elevation: 1,191 ft (363 m)

Population (2020)
  - Total: 452
  - Density: 849.2/sq mi (327.89/km^{2})
- Time zone: UTC-5 (Eastern (EST))
  - Summer (DST): UTC-4 (EDT)
- ZIP code(s): 49262
- Area code: 517
- FIPS code: 26-57920
- GNIS feature ID: 0633466

North Adams is a village in Hillsdale County in the U.S. state of Michigan. The population was 452 at the 2020 census. The village is located within Adams Township.

== History ==
The area was first settled by William Cutler, who moved here from Niagara County, New York in 1835. He opened a tavern, and the community became known as Cutler's Corner. It was given a post office under that name on June 27, 1848. The post office was renamed North Adams on May 1, 1850, due to its northern location within Adams Township. The community was platted under the name North Adams in 1871 and incorporated as a village in 1881.

== Geography ==
According to the U.S. Census Bureau, the village has a total area of 0.53 square miles (1.37 km^{2}), all land.

== Demographics ==
Historical population
| Census | Pop. | Note | %± |
|---|---|---|---|
| 1880 | 433 | | — |
| 1890 | 504 | | 16.4% |
| 1900 | 422 | | −16.3% |
| 1910 | 440 | | 4.3% |
| 1920 | 414 | | −5.9% |
| 1930 | 457 | | 10.4% |
| 1940 | 496 | | 8.5% |
| 1950 | 499 | | 0.6% |
| 1960 | 494 | | −1.0% |
| 1970 | 574 | | 16.2% |
| 1980 | 565 | | −1.6% |
| 1990 | 512 | | −9.4% |
| 2000 | 514 | | 0.4% |
| 2010 | 477 | | −7.2% |
| 2020 | 452 | | −5.2% |
U.S. Decennial Census

=== 2010 census ===
As of the census of 2010, there were 477 people, 189 households, and 137 families living in the village. The population density was 917.3 inhabitants per square mile (354.2/km^{2}). There were 219 housing units at an average density of 421.2 per square mile (162.6/km^{2}). The racial makeup of the village was 98.1% White, 0.4% Native American, 0.4% Asian, 0.2% from other races, and 0.8% from two or more races. Hispanic or Latino of any race were 0.2% of the population.

There were 189 households, of which 32.3% had children under the age of 18 living with them, 55.6% were married couples living together, 13.8% had a female householder with no husband present, 3.2% had a male householder with no wife present, and 27.5% were non-families. 23.8% of all households were made up of individuals, and 10% had someone living alone who was 65 years of age or older. The average household size was 2.52 and the average family size was 3.00.

The median age in the village was 40.2 years. 24.5% of residents were under the age of 18; 6.7% were between the ages of 18 and 24; 26.7% were from 25 to 44; 24.5% were from 45 to 64; and 17.6% were 65 years of age or older. The gender makeup of the village was 48.0% male and 52.0% female.

=== 2000 census ===
As of the census of 2000, there were 514 people, 204 households, and 144 families living in the village. The population density was 974.5 inhabitants per square mile (376.3/km^{2}). There were 215 housing units at an average density of 407.6 per square mile (157.4/km^{2}). The racial makeup of the village was 99.22% White, 0.58% Native American, 0.19% from other races. Hispanic or Latino of any race were 1.95% of the population.

There were 204 households, out of which 31.9% had children under the age of 18 living with them, 56.9% were married couples living together, 6.9% had a female householder with no husband present, and 29.4% were non-families. 26.0% of all households were made up of individuals, and 9.8% had someone living alone who was 65 years of age or older. The average household size was 2.52 and the average family size was 3.01.

In the village, the population was spread out, with 26.5% under the age of 18, 8.6% from 18 to 24, 28.0% from 25 to 44, 23.5% from 45 to 64, and 13.4% who were 65 years of age or older. The median age was 35 years. For every 100 females, there were 108.1 males. For every 100 females age 18 and over, there were 108.8 males.

The median income for a household in the village was $38,523, and the median income for a family was $42,813. Males had a median income of $30,774 versus $22,750 for females. The per capita income for the village was $19,850. About 1.3% of families and 3.2% of the population were below the poverty line, including 1.6% of those under age 18 and 7.7% of those age 65 or over.

== Education ==
The village is served entirely by the North Adams-Jerome Schools. The main campus is located just south of the village boundaries.

== Notable people ==
- Emma Pow Bauder (1848–1932), evangelist and author
- Maxine Kline (1929-2022), professional baseball pitcher

== Images ==
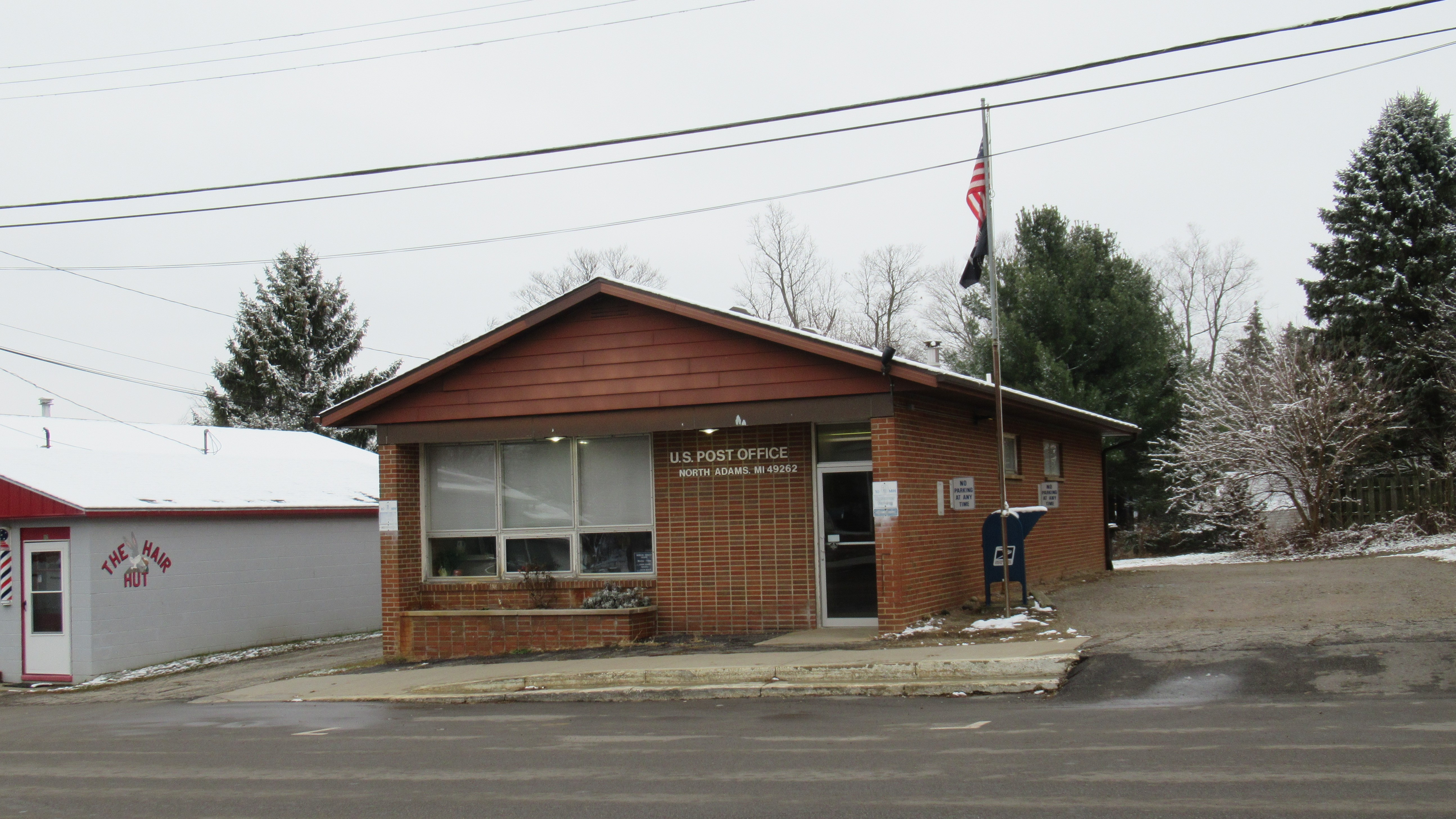
U.S. Post Office in North Adams

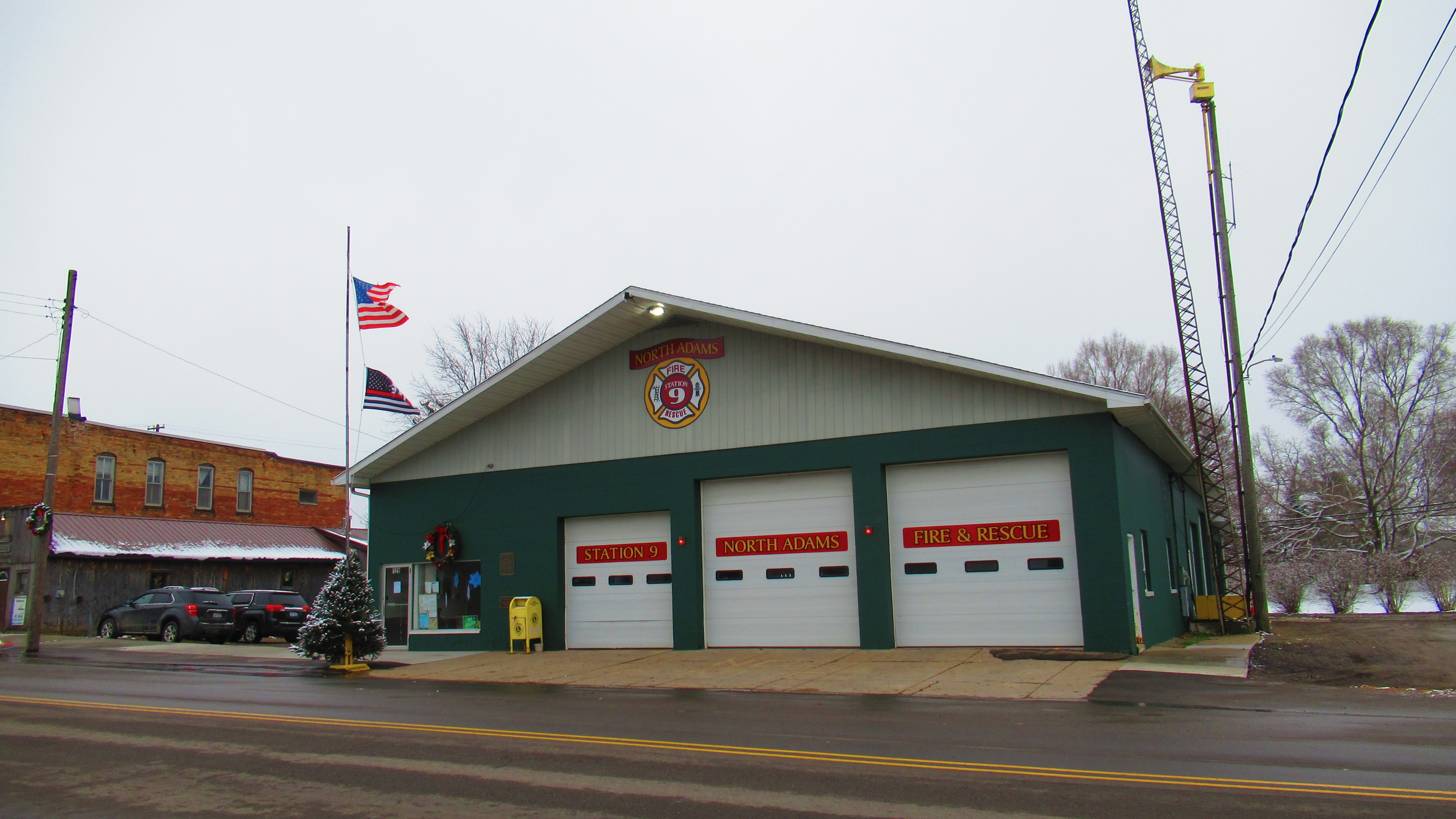
Village office and fire department

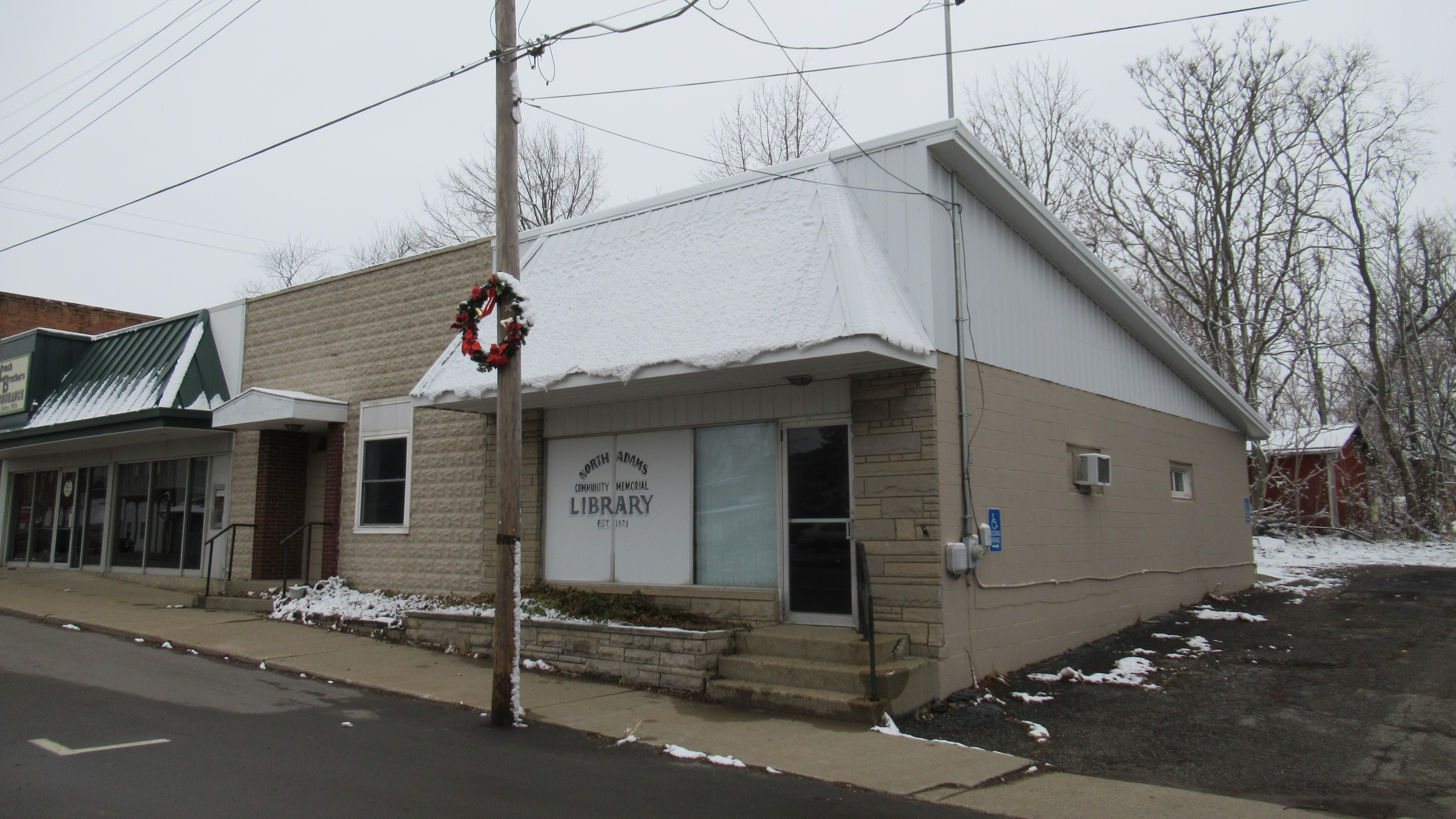
Community Memorial Library

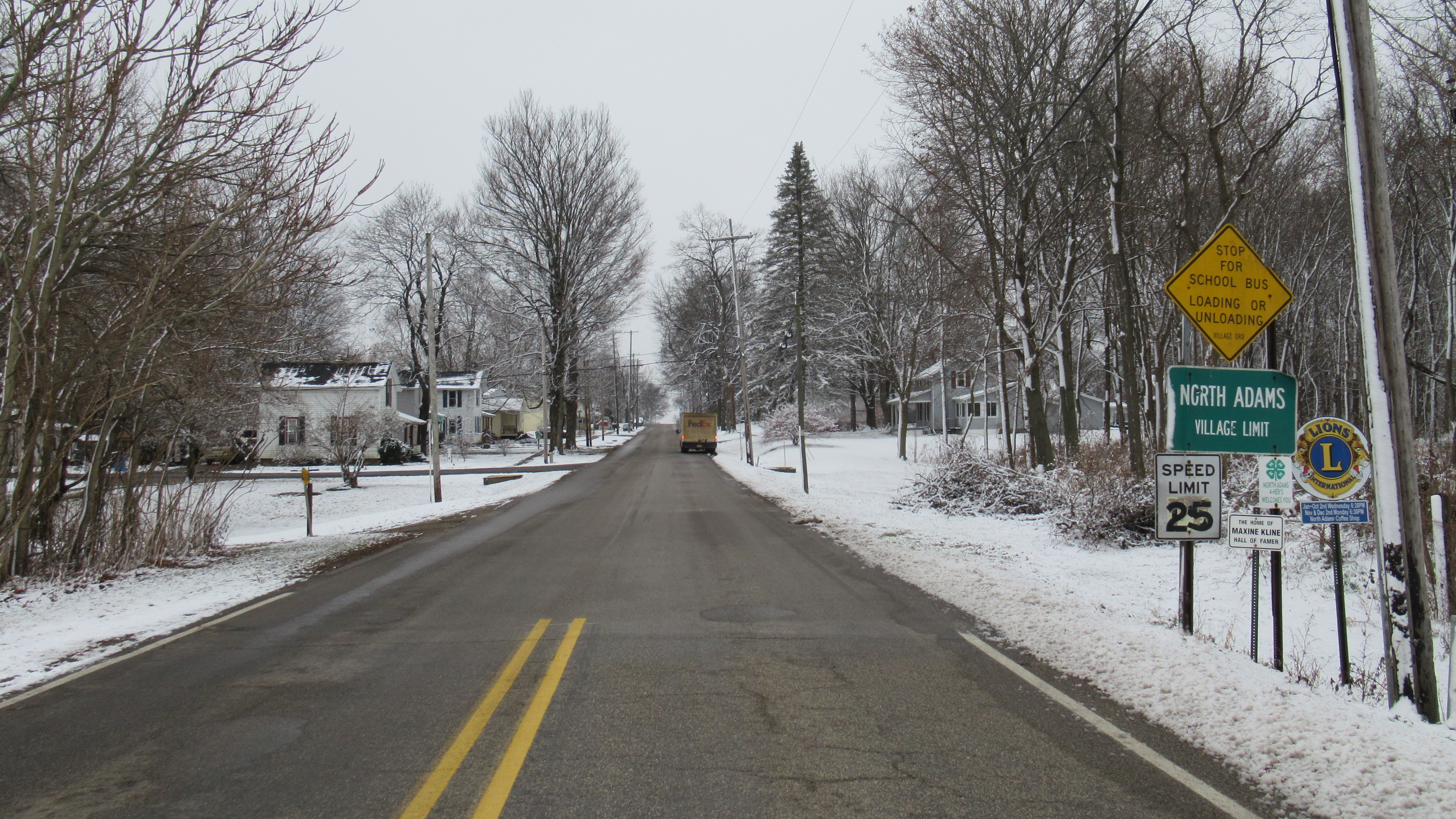
Southbound along Hillsdale Street
