= WCSR (AM) =

- Hillsdale, Michigan; United States
- Frequency: 1340 kHz
- Branding: 99.5 The Dale

Programming
- Format: Country
- Affiliations: Motor Racing Network

Ownership
- Owner: McKibbin Media Group, Inc.
- Sister stations: WCSR-FM

History
- First air date: 1955
- Former call signs: WBSE (1955–1958)
- Call sign meaning: "Community Service Radio"

Technical information
- Licensing authority: FCC
- Facility ID: 71299
- Class: C
- Power: 500 watts day; 250 watts night
- Transmitter coordinates: 41°55′41″N 84°38′10″W
- Translator: 99.5 W258DE (Hillsdale)

Links
- Public license information: Public file; LMS

WCSR is a radio station located in Hillsdale, Michigan. It transmits on 1340 kHz with 500 watts in the daytime and 250 watts at night. WCSR is owned by McKibbin Media Group, Inc.

== History ==
WCSR began in 1955 as WBSE, a 100-watt AM station with studios on Broad Street in downtown Hillsdale. It was owned by Baw Beese Enterprises and changed call signs to WCSR on December 30, 1958. In 1962, the station moved to its current location on West Street and upgraded its power to 500 watts. In 1973, WCSR-FM 92.1 began broadcasting. In April 2019, a license was granted for the translator W258DE (99.5 FM) to WCSR.

On February 28, 2020, WCSR 1340 AM/W258DE split from its simulcast with WCSR-FM and changed their format to country, branded as "99.5 The Dale".
