= Robert Worden =

American politician

Member of the Michigan House of Representatives from the Hillsdale County 3rd district
- In office January 5, 1853 – December 31, 1854
- Preceded by: District established
- Succeeded by: Gideon G. King

Personal details
- Born: March 10, 1809
- Died: May 1893 (aged 84)
- Party: Democratic

Robert Worden Jr. (March 10, 1809 – May 1893) was a Michigan politician.

== Early life ==
Robert Worden Jr. was born on March 10, 1809, to parents Robert and Lucy Worden. In August 1832, Worden married Orpha M. Fairbank in Eaton, New York. On April 1, 1834, Worden arrived in Michigan from Fairport, New York, in a covered wagon with his family. There, Worden built a log cabin. As early settlers in Michigan, Worden's party had trouble dealing with the outdoors, particularly with the pest known as the deer mouse. Worden procured a cat from Adrian, Michigan, to help deal with this pest.

== Career ==
Worden was a farmer. In 1836, Worden served as a Pittsford school inspector, alongside Urias Treadwell and Sidney S. Ford. Worden served as treasurer of Hillsdale County from 1848 to 1852. On November 2, 1852, Worden was elected to the Michigan House of Representatives where he represented the Hillsdale County 3rd district from January 5, 1853, to December 31, 1854. During his time in the legislature, Worden lived in Hudson, Michigan. Later, around 1888, Worden lived in Owosso, Michigan. In 1872, Worden served as president of the Hillsdale County Agricultural Society.

== Personal life ==
Worden was a Freemason.

== Death ==
Worden died in May 1893.
