= Ransom Township, Michigan =

- Civil township
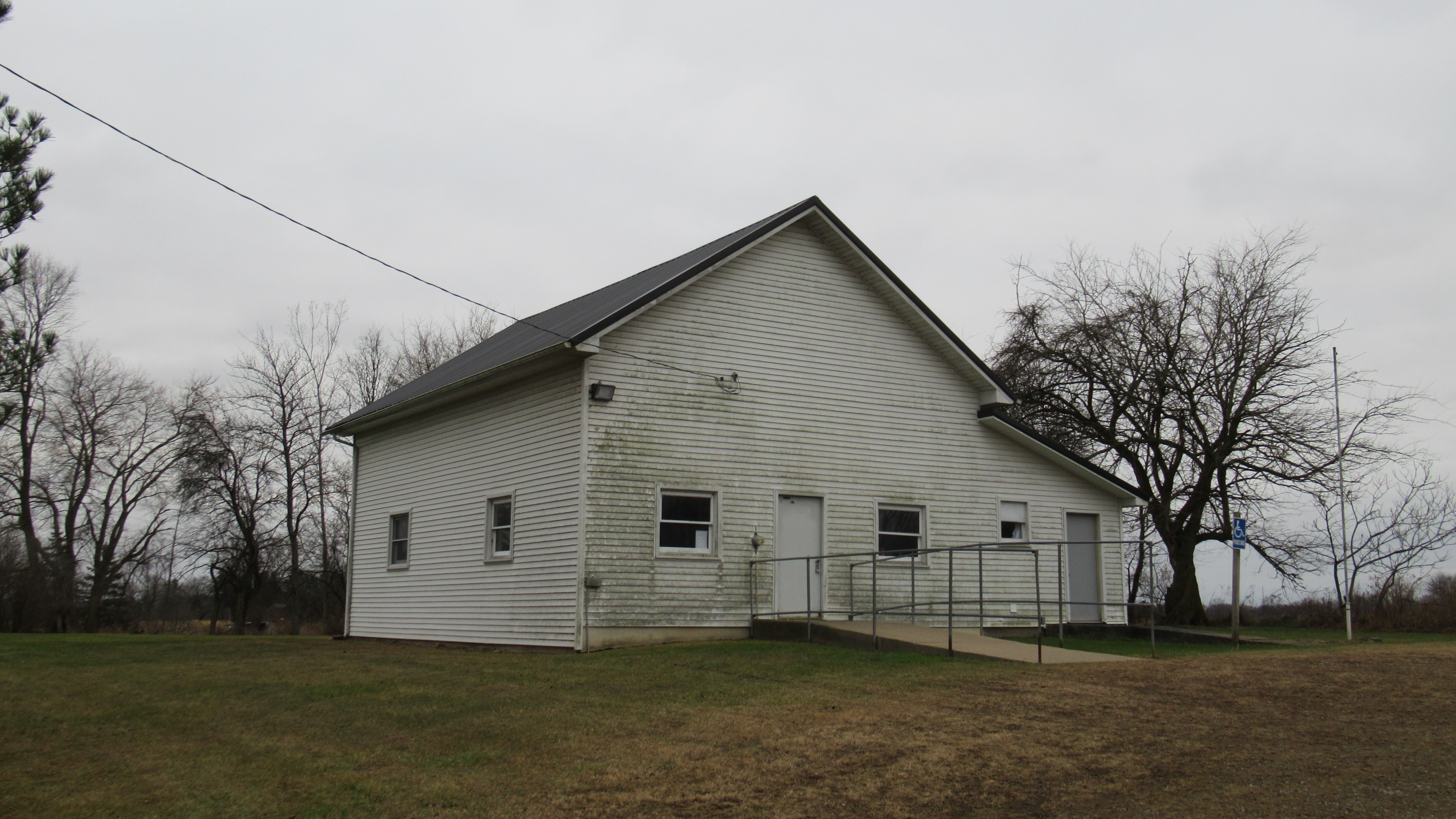
- Ransom Township Hall

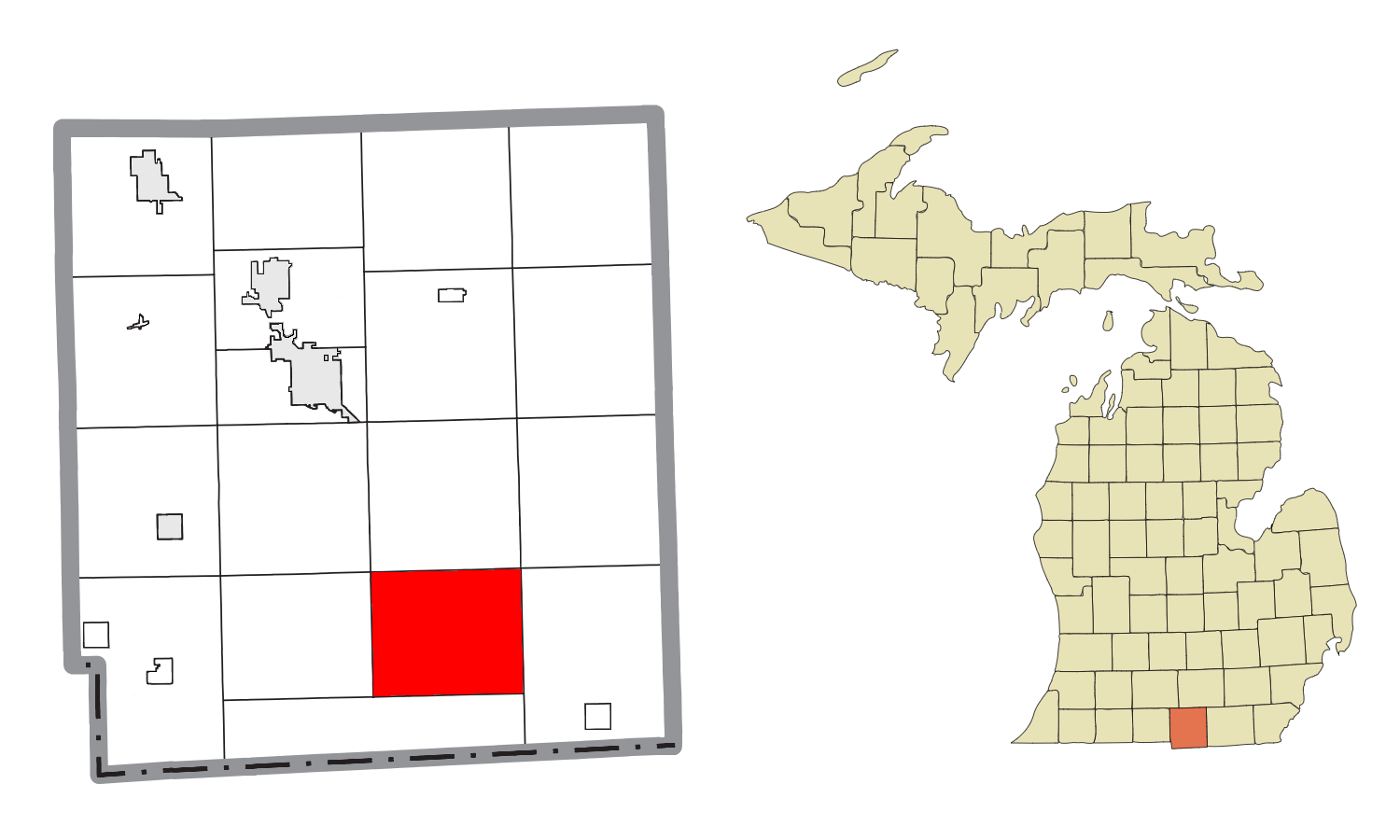
- Location within Hillsdale County

- Location within the state of Michigan Location within the United States
- Coordinates: 41°46′14″N 84°31′50″W
- Country: United States
- State: Michigan
- County: Hillsdale
- Established: 1848

Government
  - Supervisor: Clifford Fether
  - Clerk: Susan Ruder

Area
  - Total: 30.18 sq mi (78.17 km^{2})
  - Land: 30.08 sq mi (77.91 km^{2})
  - Water: 0.10 sq mi (0.26 km^{2})
- Elevation: 1,001 ft (305 m)

Population (2020)
  - Total: 1,012
  - Density: 33.6/sq mi (13.0/km^{2})
- Time zone: UTC-5 (Eastern (EST))
  - Summer (DST): UTC-4 (EDT)
- ZIP code(s): 49266 (Osseo); 49288 (Waldron); 49271 (Pittsford)
- Area code: 517
- FIPS code: 26-67120
- GNIS feature ID: 1626952

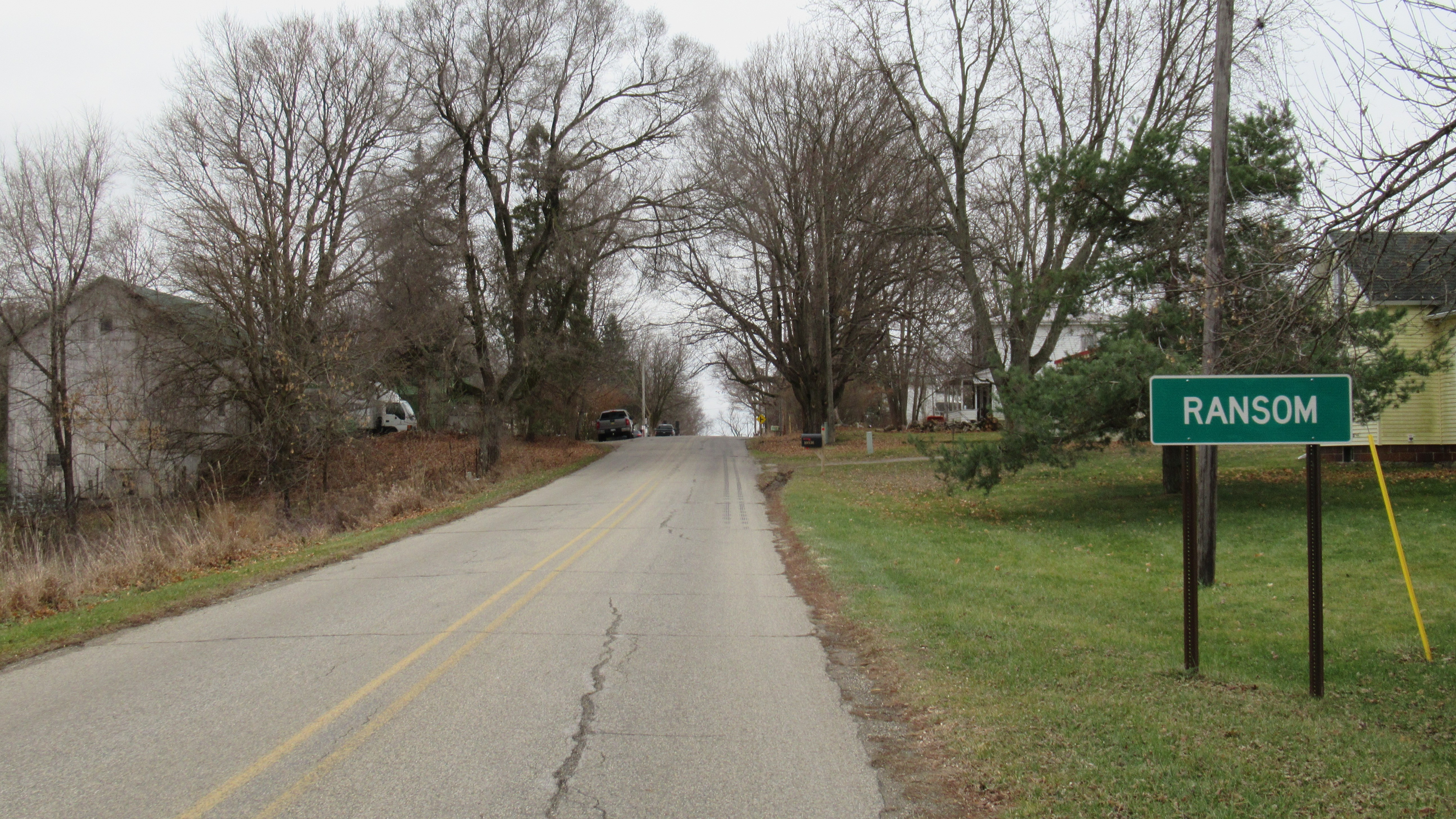
Unincorporated community of Ransom

Ransom Township is a civil township of Hillsdale County in the U.S. state of Michigan. The population was 1,012 at the 2020 census.

== Communities ==
- Betzer is an unincorporated community in the eastern portion of the township on the boundary with Wright Township at 41°45′11″N 84°28′33″W. The community was named after the Daniel Colbetzer, who served as the first postmaster when a post office opened here on November 15, 1886. The post office operated until December 31, 1901.
- Ransom is an unincorporated community located within the township at 41°46′31″N 84°32′03″W. It was first settled in 1840 in the area formerly called Rowland Township, which was named after pioneering settler Rowland Bird. It was given a post office named North Rowland on April 17, 1848. It was renamed Ransom soon after on September 5, 1848 when the area was reorganized under the name Ransom Township. It was named after Epaphroditus Ransom, who was the governor of Michigan at the time. The post office was briefly named Bird the following year but then renamed back to Ransom in 1850. The Ransom post office operated until August 31, 1936.

== Geography ==
According to the United States Census Bureau, the township has a total area of 30.18 square miles (78.17 km^{2}), of which 30.08 square miles (77.91 km^{2}) is land and 0.10 square miles (0.26 km^{2}) (0.33%) is water.

=== Historic sites ===
- Trunk Line Bridge No. 237 is an arch bridge listed on the National Register of Historic Places. Built in 1918, it carries Burt Road over Silver Creek.

=== Major highways ===
- M-99 runs south–north through the center of the township.

== Demographics ==
As of the census of 2000, there were 982 people, 324 households, and 256 families residing in the township. The population density was 32.6 inhabitants per square mile (12.6/km^{2}). There were 353 housing units at an average density of 11.7 per square mile (4.5/km^{2}). The racial makeup of the township was 98.07% white, 0.10% Asian, 0.41% from other races, and 1.43% from two or more races. Hispanic or Latino of any race were 1.43% of the population.

There were 324 households, out of which 40.1% had children under the age of 18 living with them, 68.5% were married couples living together, 5.6% had a female householder with no husband present, and 20.7% were non-families. 17.9% of all households were made up of individuals, and 6.5% had someone living alone who was 65 years of age or older. The average household size was 2.97 and the average family size was 3.34.

In the township the population was spread out, with 31.6% under the age of 18, 7.1% from 18 to 24, 27.0% from 25 to 44, 24.1% from 45 to 64, and 10.2% who were 65 years of age or older. The median age was 35 years. For every 100 females, there were 110.3 males. For every 100 females age 18 and over, there were 106.1 males.

The median income for a household in the township was $40,069, and the median income for a family was $43,264. Males had a median income of $31,806 versus $22,438 for females. The per capita income for the township was $15,904. About 8.0% of families and 13.4% of the population were below the poverty line, including 19.9% of those under age 18 and 7.4% of those age 65 or over.

== Education ==
The township is served by three separate public school districts. The western portion of the township is served by Camden-Frontier Schools to the southwest in Amboy Township. The northeast portion of the township is served by Pittsford Area Schools to the northeast in Pittsford. A small portion of the southeast corner of the township is served by Waldron Area Schools to the east in Wright Township.

== Notable people ==
- Jason E. Hammond, educator and politician, born in Ransom Township
