= Rowland Township =

Rowland Township may refer to:

- Rowland Township, Michigan
- Rowland Township, North Carolina
