= Osseo =

Osseo is the name of three places in the United States:

- Osseo, Michigan
- Osseo, Minnesota
- Osseo, Wisconsin
