= Osseo, Michigan =

- Unincorporated community
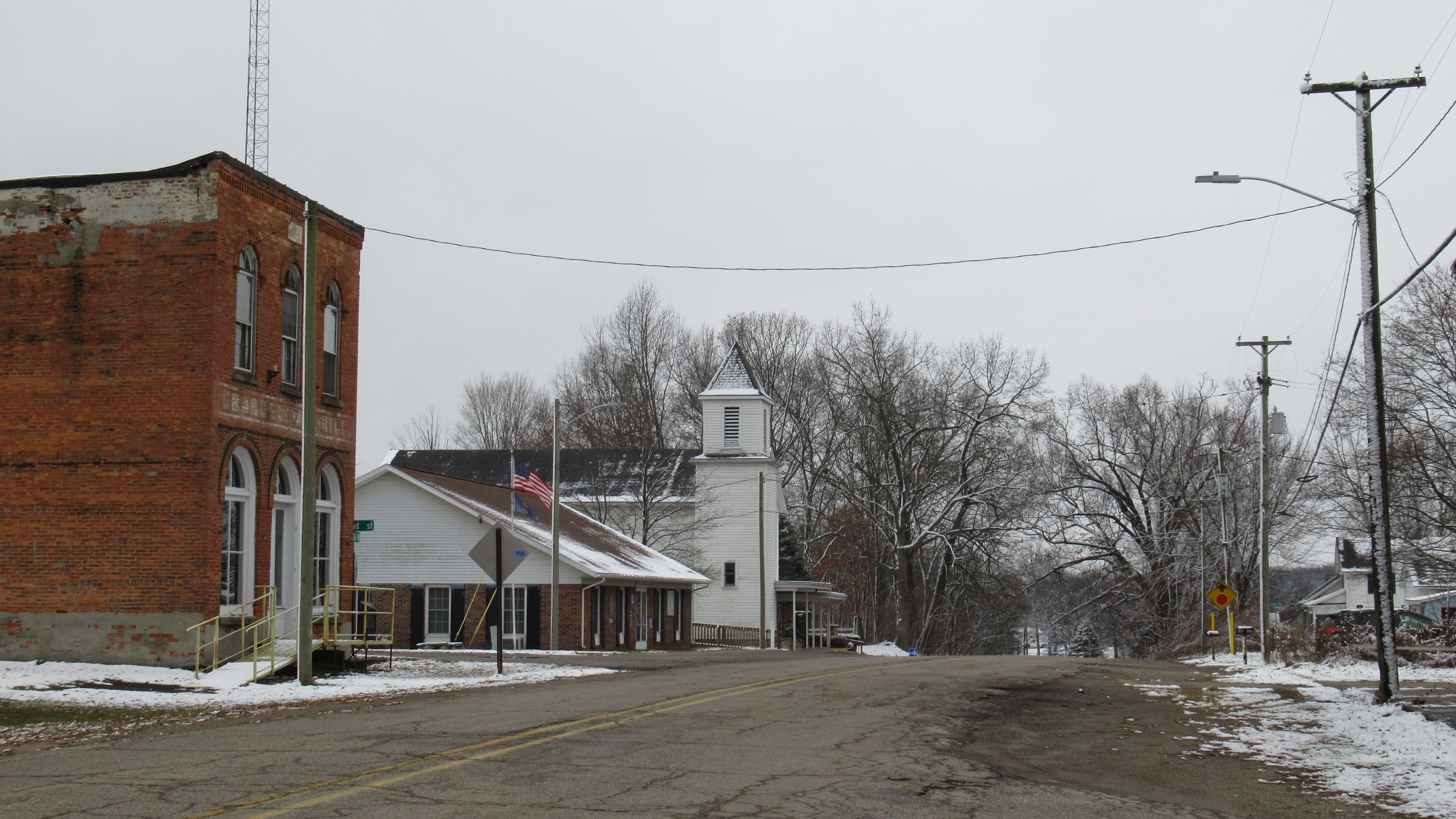
- Looking south along Bird Lake Road

- Location within the state of Michigan Location within the United States
- Coordinates: 41°53′09″N 84°32′39″W
- Country: United States
- State: Michigan
- County: Hillsdale
- Township: Jefferson
- Settled: 1840
- Elevation: 1,109 ft (338 m)
- Time zone: UTC-5 (Eastern (EST))
  - Summer (DST): UTC-4 (EDT)
- ZIP code(s): 49266
- Area code: 517
- GNIS feature ID: 634143

Osseo (/ɑːˈsiːˈoʊ/ ah-SEE-oh) is an unincorporated community in Hillsdale County in the U.S. state of Michigan. The community is located along M-34 within Jefferson Township.

As an unincorporated community, Osseo has no legally defined boundaries or population statistics of its own but does have its own post office with the 49266 ZIP Code.

== Geography ==
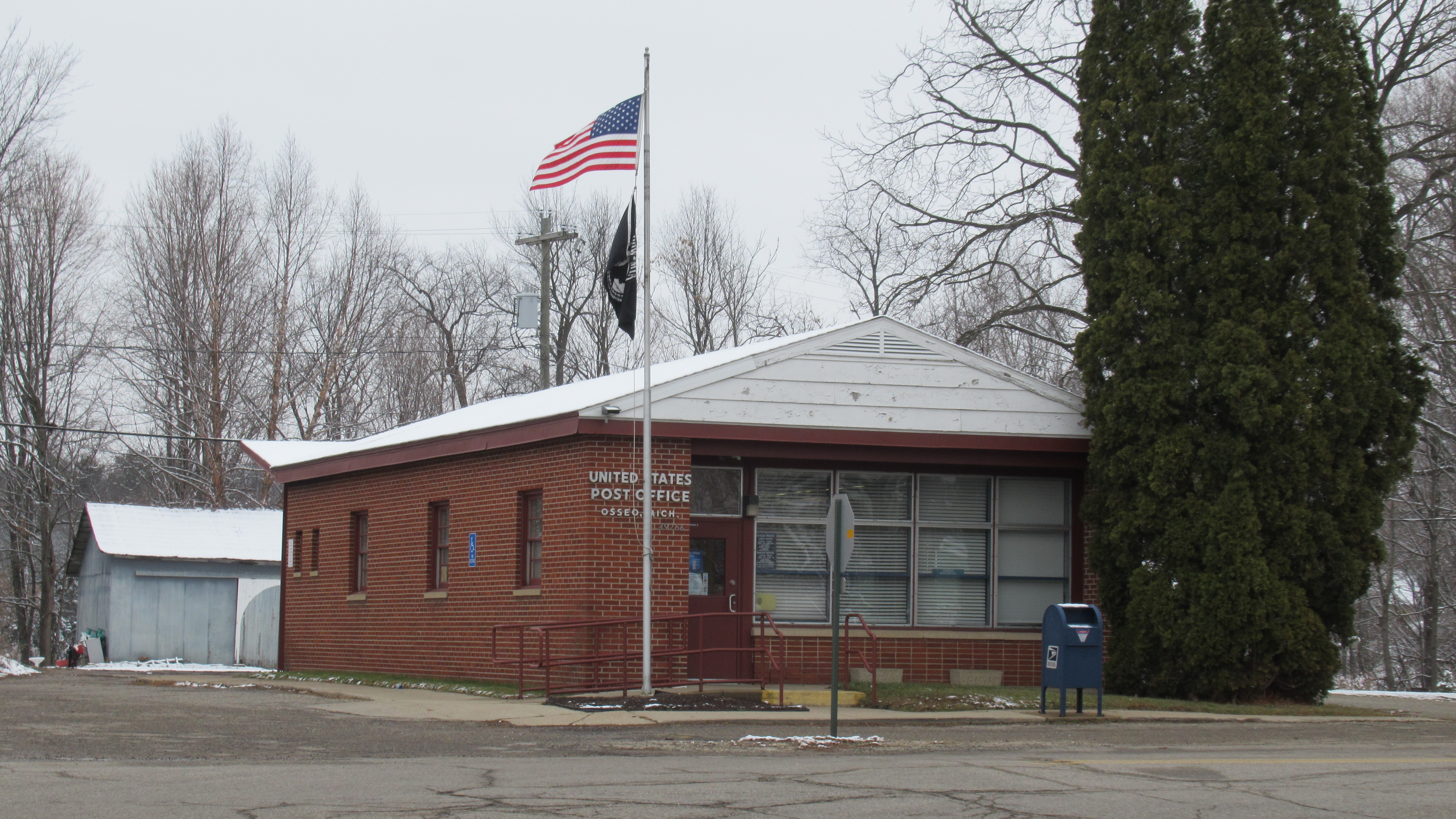
U.S. Post Office in Osseo

Osseo is located in southeast Michigan in central Hillsdale County about 30 miles (48 km) east of the city of Coldwater. Located in northern Jefferson Township, the community sits at an elevation of 1,109 feet (338 m) above sea level.

Osseo is centered near M-34 (Hudson Road), which is right before M-34 has its western terminus with M-99 (Pioneer Road). Other nearby unincorporated communities include Steamburg to the west, Shadyside and Fountain Park to the south, Locust Corners to the east, and the census-designated place of Pittsford to the southeast. The city of Hillsdale is located about 5.0 miles (8.0 km) to the northwest along M-99.

The commununity is surrounded by several lakes, including Deer Lake and Twin Lake within close proximity. The lakes are connected by the east branch of the St. Joseph River. The Lost Nations State Game Area is a 2,471-acre (10.0 km^{2}) state game area located just south of the community. The North Country Trail passes through Osseo. This portion of the trail is known as the Baw Beese Trail, which runs 8.6 miles (13.8 km) northwest to Hillsdale.

The Jefferson Township Hall is located within Osseo at 2837 Bird Lake Road in the center of the community. The Osseo post office is located at 5500 Beecher Road. The Osseo 49266 ZIP Code serves the majority of Jefferson Township and the southern portion of Adams Township to the north. The post office also serves a very small area of Wheatland Township to the east, as well as the central part of Ransom Township and very small areas of Amboy Township and Cambria Township to the south. The community is served by Hillsdale Community Schools to the northwest in the city of Hillsdale.

== History ==
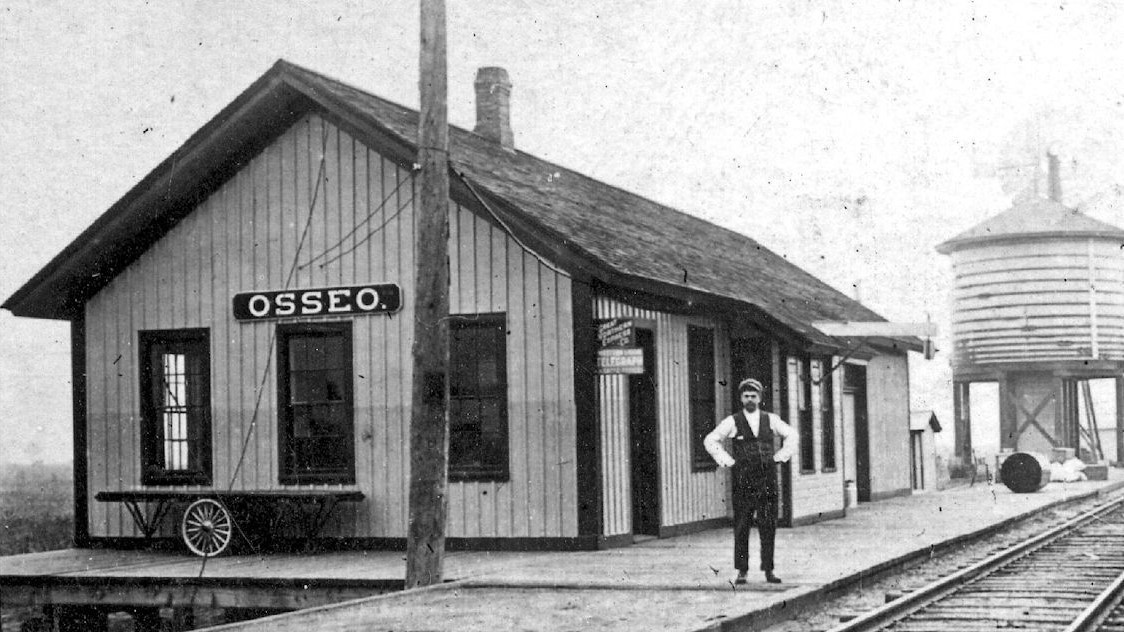
Former train station in Osseo

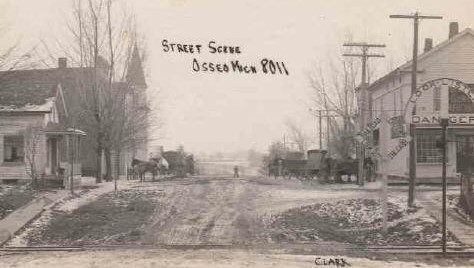
Historic image of Osseo from 1910

The area was first settled as early as 1840 when the community of Osseo was officially platted. The name Osseo is an Indian word that means "fiery plumes" and was derived from the annual burning of the marshes and woods by the Indians in preparation for springtime.

The community was formed by settlers from nearby Jonesville is an attempt to keep the county seat from moving to Hillsdale. Jonesville was previously assigned as the first county seat when Hillsdale County was organized in 1835, but the community of Hillsdale was growing in size and was petitioning to replace Jonesville as the county seat. Instead, the new community of Osseo was given the role as the new county seat in 1840, although the community never held any government offices and was never actually used as the county seat. While Osseo was designated as the legal county seat, Jonesville and Hillsdale continued competing for the right to serve as the county seat in a fairly nonviolent county seat war.

Residents of Osseo began planning and were eager to build new government buildings in hopes of maintaining their status as the county seat. However, Osseo was never seriously considered as the new county seat, and it was just a plan by Jonesville residents to keep the county seat away from Hillsdale. Ultimately, when it was apparent that Osseo was going to lose its status as the county seat, the residents sided with Hillsdale for the role of the permanent county seat, in which Hillsdale earned in 1843.

When Osseo was founded, it was part of Florida Township. A post office named Florida began operating on July 23, 1839 within the township, which itself was established in 1837. The township was renamed Jefferson in 1849. The community can be seen on an 1857 map of Hillsdale County. The Florida post office was moved and renamed Osseo on December 14, 1861 and has remained in operation ever since. In 1864, Osseo received a train station along the Lake Shore and Michigan Southern Railway. Osseo became a lumbering community, and several sawmills were built to exploit the area's lumber resources. By 1865, the community recorded around 250 residents. By 1879 at the height of the community, Osseo had a population of around 350 residents and grew to include about 60 dwellings, two churches, several grocery and hardware stores, blacksmith shops, two factories, a hotel, and schoolhouse. In addition to lumber, the community grew around the brick and tile factories, which benefited from the large amount of clay soil in the area.

In 1919, M-34 became one of the first state highways and ran though Osseo. This highway gave direct road access to the city of Adrian approximately 30 miles (48 km) to the east. In 1940, the current route of M-99 was established slightly west of the community, and it provides direct road access to Hillsdale and Jonesville to the northwest and to the state of Ohio to the south. The railway through the community was eventually discontinued, and the rail lines were removed. The land of the former railway has remained undeveloped as a green space, and portions of this now consist of the Baw Beese Trail as part of the North Country Trail.
