= Pittsford Township, Michigan =

- Civil township
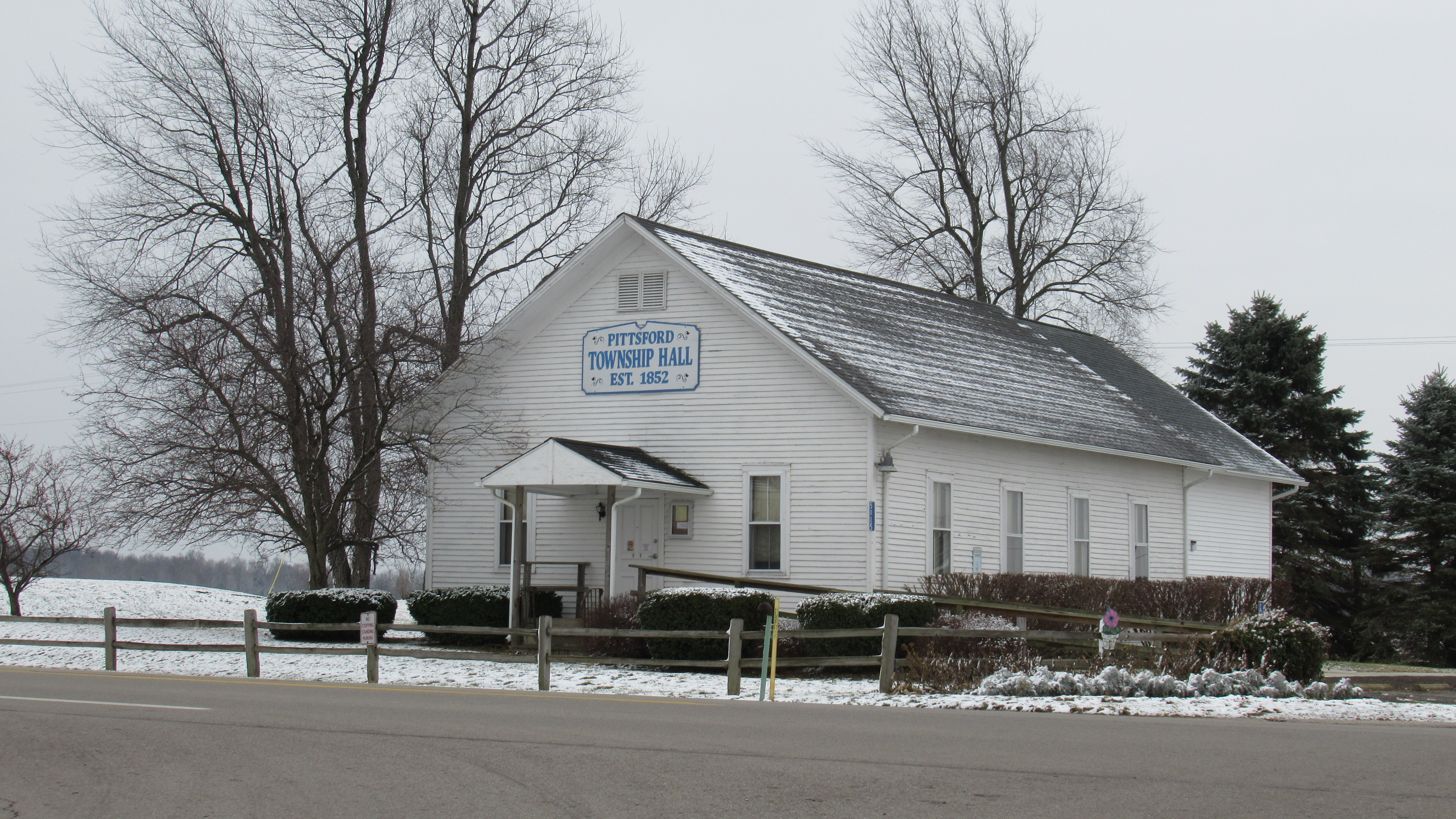
- Pittsford Township Hall

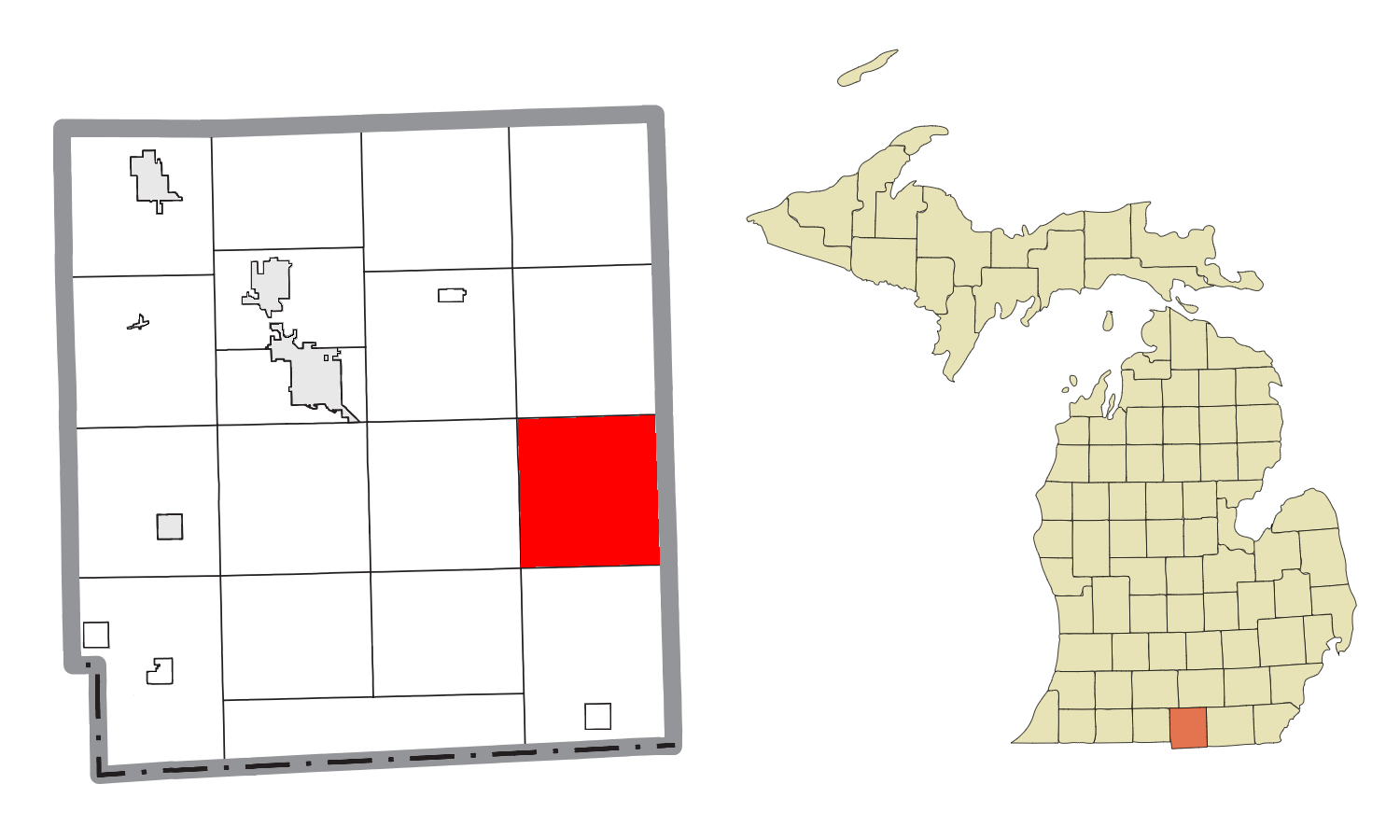
- Location within Hillsdale County

- Location within the state of Michigan Location within the United States
- Coordinates: 41°51′45″N 84°25′45″W
- Country: United States
- State: Michigan
- County: Hillsdale
- Established: 1852

Government
  - Supervisor: Leaann Zimmerman
  - Clerk: Cinda Walton

Area
  - Total: 35.59 sq mi (92.18 km^{2})
  - Land: 35.42 sq mi (91.74 km^{2})
  - Water: 0.17 sq mi (0.44 km^{2})
- Elevation: 1,014 ft (309 m)

Population (2020)
  - Total: 1,577
  - Density: 44.5/sq mi (17.2/km^{2})
- Time zone: UTC-5 (Eastern (EST))
  - Summer (DST): UTC-4 (EDT)
- ZIP code(s): 49247 (Hudson); 49271 (Pittsford)
- Area code: 517
- FIPS code: 26-64620
- GNIS feature ID: 1626910

Pittsford Township is a civil township of Hillsdale County in the U.S. state of Michigan. The population was 1,577 at the 2020 census.

== Communities ==
- Locust Corners is an unincorporated community located within the township at 41°53′02″N 84°25′13″W.
- Pittsford is an unincorporated community and census-designated place on the boundary with Jefferson Township at 41°51′44″N 84°28′36″W.

== Geography ==
According to the U.S. Census Bureau, the township has a total area of 35.59 square miles (92.18 km^{2}), of which 35.42 square miles (91.74 km^{2}) is land and 0.17 square miles (0.44 km^{2}) (0.48%) is water.

=== Major highways ===
- US 127 forms most of the eastern boundary of the township with Lenawee County.
- M-34 (Hudson Road) runs east–west through the center of the township.

== Demographics ==
As of the census of 2000, there were 1,600 people, 574 households, and 455 families residing in the township. The population density was 45.1 inhabitants per square mile (17.4/km^{2}). There were 611 housing units at an average density of 17.2 per square mile (6.6/km^{2}). The racial makeup of the township was 97.50% White, 0.25% African American, 0.38% Native American, 0.19% Asian, 0.75% from other races, and 0.94% from two or more races. Hispanic or Latino of any race were 1.44% of the population.

There were 574 households, out of which 36.4% had children under the age of 18 living with them, 70.0% were married couples living together, 6.3% had a female householder with no husband present, and 20.7% were non-families. 17.9% of all households were made up of individuals, and 7.7% had someone living alone who was 65 years of age or older. The average household size was 2.75 and the average family size was 3.09.

In the township the population was spread out, with 26.6% under the age of 18, 8.1% from 18 to 24, 28.1% from 25 to 44, 23.6% from 45 to 64, and 13.6% who were 65 years of age or older. The median age was 38 years. For every 100 females, there were 102.5 males. For every 100 females age 18 and over, there were 97.3 males.

The median income for a household in the township was $44,539, and the median income for a family was $51,818. Males had a median income of $37,431 versus $26,302 for females. The per capita income for the township was $19,852. About 2.6% of families and 3.7% of the population were below the poverty line, including 0.8% of those under age 18 and 10.2% of those age 65 or over.

== Education ==
The township is served by two separate public school districts. The western portion of the township is served by Pittsford Area Schools, while the eastern portion is served by Hudson Area Schools to the east in Hudson.

== Notable people ==
- Hugh M. Cole, historian and army officer
