= M-99 (Michigan highway) =

State highway in Michigan, United States

M-99
- M-99 highlighted in red

Route information
- Maintained by MDOT
- Length: 86.058 mi (138.497 km)
- Existed: 1940–present

Major junctions
- South end: SR 15 near Pioneer, OH
- M-34 near Osseo; US 12 in Jonesville; M-49 in Litchfield; M-60 in Homer; I-94 near Albion; M-50 in Eaton Rapids; I-96 in Lansing
- North end: I-496 in Lansing

Location
- Country: United States
- State: Michigan
- Counties: Hillsdale, Calhoun, Jackson, Eaton, Ingham

Highway system
- Michigan State Trunkline Highway System; Interstate; US; State; Byways
← M-98	→ M-100
← M-8	M-9	→ US 10
← M-157	M-158	→ M-168

M-99 is a north–south state trunkline highway in the Lower Peninsula of the US state of Michigan. It runs from the Ohio state border, where it connects to State Route 15 (SR 15), north to Lansing, where it terminates at a junction with Interstate 496 (I-496). The highway mainly serves local communities along the route as it passes through farm lands in the southern part of the state. One short segment, in Jonesville, is routed concurrently with US Highway 12 (US 12). The segment within Lansing follows Martin Luther King Jr. Boulevard.

The current highway is the third to carry the M-99 designation. The others were located near Lake Michigan near Muskegon in the Lower Peninsula and Gulliver in the Upper Peninsula in the 1920s and 1930s. The current highway was first designated as parts of M-34 and M-64 in 1919. These numbers were later dropped in favor of an M-9 designation in 1929. For part of 1934, a loop route was designated M-158 in Hillsdale County that was used for a rerouted M-9 in the area. The M-99 designation was applied to the highway in 1940. Since then, the state has completed paving twice; one segment was returned to gravel surface for two years in the 1950s. The southern section in Hillsdale County was rerouted in the 1960s, and sections were converted into divided highways in the late 1970s.

== Route description ==
SR 15 ends at the Michigan state line just north of Pioneer, Ohio, where it becomes M-99. The roadway travels northward from the state line on Pioneer Road, through mostly agricultural areas of Hillsdale County before reaching a junction with M-34 just west of Osseo. The trunkline turns westward on Hudson Road, which curves to the north around Baw Beese Lake just southeast of Hillsdale. M-99 passes through Hillsdale on a northwest course on Broad Street and Carlton Road, passing just a few blocks to the west of Hillsdale College. After leaving town, the road bends to the north as Olds Street as it runs parallel to the St. Joseph River to Jonesville. In that community, M-99 intersects US 12. The two highways run concurrently through Jonesville for less than half a mile (0.8 km) before M-99 returns to its northwesterly course. It leaves the town toward Litchfield continuing parallel to the river.

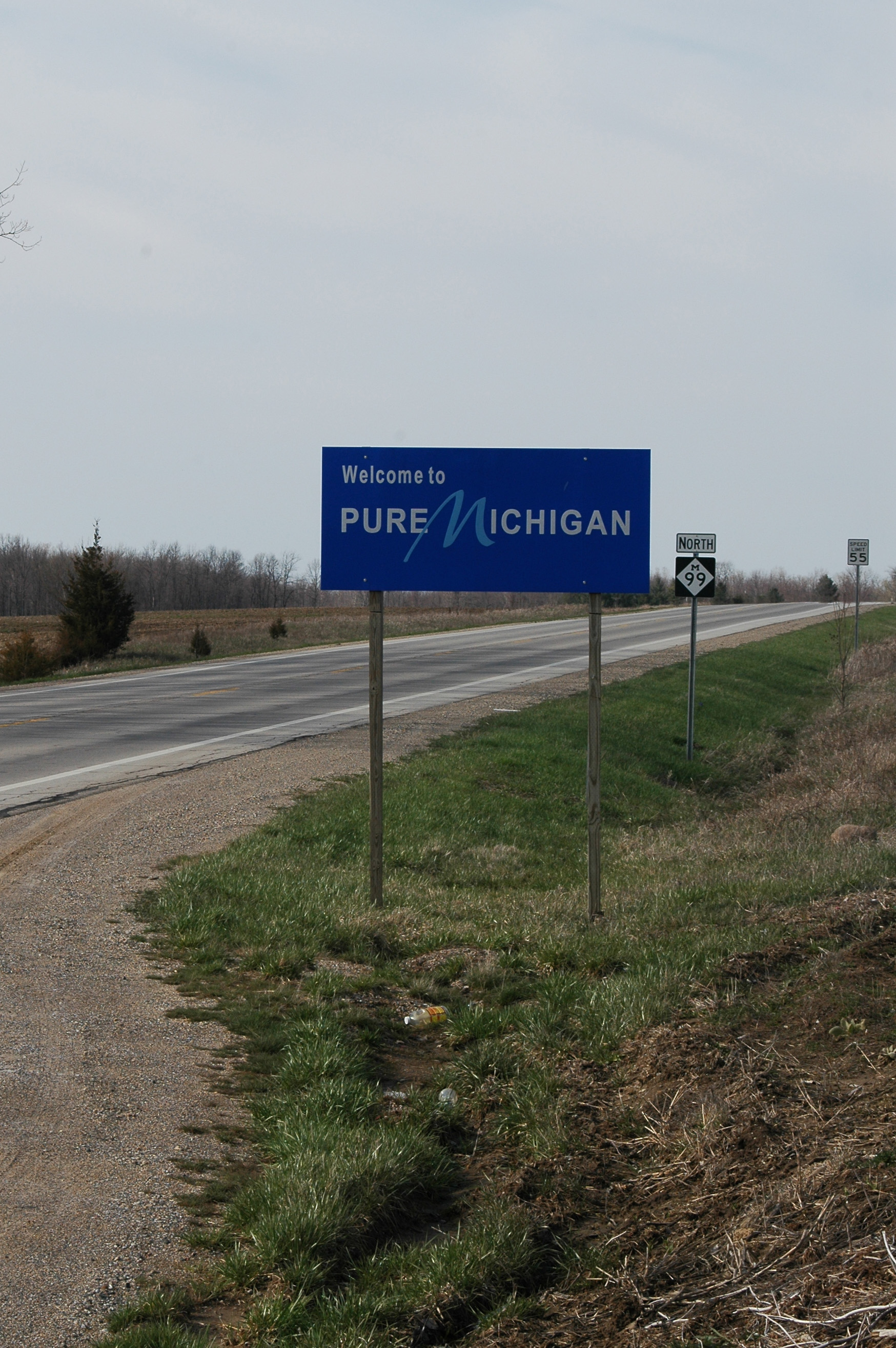
Welcome sign at the Ohio state line where SR 15 becomes M-99 northbound

In Litchfield, M-99 enters the town from the southeast, passing near downtown where it meets the northern terminus of M-49. The highway leaves Litchfield heading northwest on Homer Road for a few miles before bending to the north as it crosses into Calhoun County. The trunkline passes through more farmland as it runs toward Homer on Hillsdale Street. In Homer, after passing through a roundabout, M-99 meets M-60, and the two highways run concurrently through the town to the northeast. The road briefly splits into a divided highway near the end of the concurrency; M-99 heads north, while M-60 continues eastward. From here, M-99 continues northward on 28 Mile Road toward the city of Albion. After crossing the Kalamazoo River in downtown, M-99 merges with Business Loop I-94 (BL I-94). M-99 continues east concurrently with the business loop on Michigan Avenue passing near Albion College before heading back north to an interchange with I-94 at exit 124; this interchange marks the end of BL I-94 and M-99 continues northward on Eaton Rapids Road.

M-99 heads north through farmland to the village of Springport where it turns eastward along Main Street as it passes through the town. The highway continues easterly on Eaton Rapids Road before turning northward to cross into Eaton County. Shortly after crossing the county line, M-50 comes in from the southeast to meet up with M-99. The two highways travel together into Eaton Rapids. Together they form Main Street in the city before they separate on the north side of town. M-50 leaves to the northwest as Dexter Road, and M-99 continues to the northeast as Canal and Michigan streets. For the next few miles, the trunkline splits into a divided highway and runs parallel to the general course of the Grand River. M-99 crosses the river southeast of Dimondale after the opposing directions merge back together as an undivided highway. North of the river crossing, M-99 meets I-96 at the latter's exit 101 on the southern border of Lansing.

From I-96, the M-99 continues north through residential neighborhoods into Lansing as Martin Luther King Jr. Boulevard. The highway travels northeasterly through the southern side of the capital city, as far as Jolly Road. There it turns northward through the Old Everett Neighborhood. The street is bordered by commercial properties in this area. M-99 widens into a boulevard as it passes the T-intersection with Victor Avenue, passing through the Moores Park neighborhood before crossing the Grand River. North of the river, the highway is bordered by the site of the former Lansing Car Assembly plant, which for a century produced Oldsmobiles and other GM cars. M-99 ends at a junction with I-496 just north of the assembly plant area at exit 5; Martin Luther King Jr. Boulevard continues north from this interchange.

M-99 is maintained by the Michigan Department of Transportation (MDOT) like other state highways in Michigan. As a part of these maintenance responsibilities, the department tracks the volume of traffic that uses the roadways under its jurisdiction. MDOT's surveys in 2010 showed that the highest traffic levels along M-99 were the 32,262 vehicles daily north of Mount Hope Avenue in Lansing, on average; the lowest count was 2,300 vehicles per day between the state line and the M-34 junction. No section of M-99 has been listed on the National Highway System, a network of roads important to the country's economy, defense, and mobility.

== History ==
=== Previous designations ===
When the state highway system was originally signed in 1919, M-99 was designated on a road between the Lake Michigan shoreline and M-11 (now US 31) between Muskegon and Hart. This highway was decommissioned in 1929. In 1931, M-99 was designated on a gravel road in the Upper Peninsula from US 2 just east of Gulliver) to Port Inland on Lake Michigan. This highway was decommissioned as well in 1939.

=== Current designation ===
In 1919, the highway that is now M-99 was first signed as M-64 from the Ohio state line to Hillsdale and as M-34 from Hillsdale to the Litchfield area. In 1924, the western terminus of M-34 was extended to Homer where it terminated at M-60. Just a few years later, in 1926, the western terminus was truncated, to end at Hillsdale; the remainder to Jonesville became an extension of the M-64.

M-9
- Location: Ohio state line to Lansing
- Length: 102.266 mi (164.581 km)
- Existed: 1929–1940

M-158
- Location: Hillsdale County
- Length: 3.285 mi (5.287 km)
- Existed: Early–Late 1934

In 1929, this version of M-64 was renumbered M-9. In 1934, M-9 traveled on Pioneer Road in Hillsdale County, from the Ohio border before turning west on Burt Road, north on Clark Road, west on Montgomery Road then north onto Hillsdale Road. During this time a loop was planned to continue north from the corner of Pioneer and Burt Roads to Montgomery Road where it turned west and met with M-9 at Clark Road. This short loop was designated M-158, however later in the year the routing of M-9 was shifted onto the M-158 alignment, eliminating that route. By the middle of 1936, the highway was extended northward to end in Lansing. The M-9 designation was replaced with M-99 in 1940.

By 1947, M-99 was completely paved. One segment between Litchfield and Homer was converted back to gravel surface in 1952; a change that was reverted two years later. By 1960, the former US 12/M-99 concurrency through Albion was redesignated Business US 12 through the city when the I-94/US 12 freeway was completed. Within a year, that business loop was redesignated BL I-94 when the US 12 designation was removed from the freeway and applied to the former US 112; at the same time, the US 112/M-99 concurrency in Jonesville became US 12/M-99 as well.

A new alignment of M-99 highway was opened from the Ransom area north to Osseo in 1966; the western terminus of M-34 was scaled back to end at the new highway near Osseo and M-99 supplanted M-34 from Osseo to Hillsdale. The divided highway section of M-99 was opened north of Eaton Rapids in 1979.

The Michigan Department of State Highways first announced plans in 1970 to expand M-99 within the Lansing city limits. The plan called for conversion of M-99 to a boulevard between Victor and Pulaski streets, on the south side of the Grand River; after crossing the Grand River, the roadway would be split into a one-way pairing northerly to Kalamazoo Avenue, with northbound traffic along the existing routing on Logan Street and southbound traffic following Birch Street. Construction of such a routing was slated to displace seven acres (2.8 ha) of residential district and some businesses along Logan Street. Construction on this realignment began in 1973, and the boulevard routing from Victor to Pulaski opened in late 1977.

In 1989, Logan Street through Lansing was given an additional name, Martin Luther King Jr. Boulevard. This dual-naming scheme lasted until 1994 when the Logan Street name was removed, leaving only Martin Luther King Jr. Boulevard.

== Major intersections ==
County	Location	mi	km	Destinations	Notes
Hillsdale	Amboy Township	0.000	0.000	SR 15 south – Pioneer	Ohio state line
Hillsdale	Jefferson Township	12.633	20.331	M-34 east – Hudson, Adrian	Western terminus of M-34
Hillsdale	Jonesville	22.895	36.846	US 12 west – Coldwater	Southern end of US 12 concurrency
Hillsdale	Jonesville	23.234	37.391	US 12 east – Ypsilanti	Northern end of US 12 concurrency
Hillsdale	Litchfield	30.187	48.581	M-49 south – Reading	
Calhoun	Homer	38.310	61.654	M-60 west – Three Rivers	Western end of M-60 concurrency
Calhoun	Albion–Homer township line	41.520	66.820	M-60 east – Jackson	Eastern end of M-60 concurrency
Calhoun	Albion	47.595	76.597	BL I-94 west	Western end of BL I-94 concurrency
Jackson	Parma Township	50.415	81.135	I-94 – Chicago, Detroit BL I-94 west	Western end of BL I-94 concurrency; exit 124 on I-94
Eaton	Springport Township	63.364	101.974	M-50 east – Jackson	Southern end of M-50 concurrency
Eaton	Eaton Rapids	69.287	111.507	M-188 east	Western terminus of M-188
Eaton	Eaton Rapids	69.786	112.310	M-50 west – Charlotte	Northern end of M-50 concurrency
Ingham	Lansing	81.407– 81.426	131.012– 131.042	I-96 – Grand Rapids, Detroit	Exit 101 on I-96
Ingham	Lansing	86.039– 86.058	138.466– 138.497	I-496; M L King Boulevard	Northern terminus of M-99; exit 5 on I-496; roadway continues as M L King Boulevard
1.000 mi = 1.609 km; 1.000 km = 0.621 mi: Concurrency terminus
