= Leonidas Hubbard (politician) =

American politician

Member of the Michigan House of Representatives from the Hillsdale County 3rd district
- In office January 6, 1875 – December 31, 1876
- Preceded by: Charles D. Luce
- Succeeded by: District abolished

Personal details
- Born: December 21, 1821 Deerfield Township, Ohio
- Died: January 10, 1914 (aged 92) Wright Township, Hillsdale County, Michigan
- Party: Republican

Leonidas Hubbard (December 21, 1821 – January 10, 1914) was a Michigan politician.

== Early life ==
Hubbard was born in Deerfield Township, Ohio, on December 21, 1821. Hubbard was mostly self-educated. Hubbard taught in school for several years. In 1852, Hubbard moved to the southern part of Wright Township, Hillsdale County, Michigan.

== Political career ==
From 1853 to 1855, Hubbard served as a school inspector for Wright Township. In 1856, Hubbard moved to California, where he mined and hunted. In 1859, he returned to Wright Township, where he would continue to hold a number of local offices. In 1860, he served as a school inspector again. From 1862 to 1863, Hubbard served as supervisor. From 1864 to 1865, Hubbard served as the treasurer. From 1867 to 1868, Hubbard again served as supervisor. In 1870, Hubbard would serve his final term as supervisor. In 1875, Hubbard again served as treasurer. On November 3, 1874, Hubbard was elected to the Michigan House of Representatives where he represented the Hillsdale County 3rd district from January 6, 1875, to December 31, 1876. In 1876, Hubbard served as superintendent of schools in Wright Township.

== Church involvement ==
In June 1860, reverends William Jewell and Zephaniah Shepherd organized a church from a schoolhouse in Wright of the Disciples of Christ denomination. There were about fifteen members initially. Hubbard was elected as an elder of church. In 1874, Hubbard was elected as a trustee of the church. Around 1875, Hubbard succeeded Samuel Vandervort, who had been in charge of the church for about a year. Hubbard took charge of the church for around two years, until he relieved himself.

== Death ==
Hubbard died on January 10, 1914, in Wright Township.
