= Gideon G. King =

American politician

Member of the Michigan House of Representatives from the Hillsdale County 3rd district
- In office January 3, 1855 – December 31, 1856
- Preceded by: Robert Worden
- Succeeded by: Silas A. Wade

Personal details
- Born: c. 1820 New York
- Party: Whig; Republican

Gideon G. King (born c. 1820) was a Michigan politician.

== Early life ==
Gideon G. King was born around 1820 in New York. His father was John King. John, along with his family, moved from Lima, New York to Ypsilanti, Michigan in the winter of 1837 to 1838. The family lived there until January 1841, when they moved to Amboy, Michigan.

== Career ==
In 1848, King served as township clerk of Woodbridge Township, Michigan. In the spring election of 1850, King was elected as supervisor of Woodbridge Township. However, the formation of Amboy where King resided prevented him from filling this position. William Bryan filled King's vacancy. In 1850, King served as Amboy's first township clerk. That same year, King also served on the township's first board of school inspectors, and played a part in organizing five school districts. In 1851, King owned 80 acres in Amboy. King was a farmer. King served as supervisor of Amboy from 1851 to 1852. As supervisor and assessor at the time, he estimated that the township contained around 19,429 acres. On November 8, 1854, King was elected to the Michigan House of Representatives representing the Hillsdale County 3rd district from January 3, 1855, to December 31, 1856. King went on to serve as Amboy's supervisor from 1856 to 1857, and then again in 1860. King was first a member of the Whig Party, but then became a Republican.

== Death ==
King died at age 39.
