= Bessie Boies Cotton =

American YWCA staff member (1880–1959)

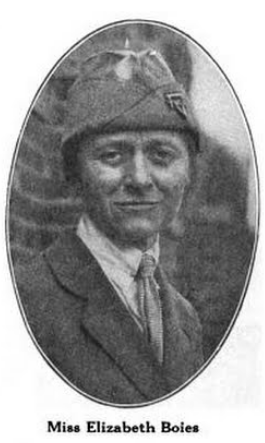
- Bessie Boies Cotton in uniform, from a 1919 publication
- Born: April 5, 1880; Hudson, Michigan
- Died: April 23, 1959 (aged 79); Los Angeles, California
- Education: Smith College; University of Chicago
- Spouse: Thomas Cotton

Bessie Boies Cotton (April 5, 1880 – April 23, 1959) was an American staff member of the Young Women's Christian Association (YWCA). She worked in Moscow and Petrograd during the Russian Provisional Government period.

== Early life ==
Elizabeth Boies was born in Hudson, Michigan, the daughter of John Keep Boies, a banker, insurance investor, and state politician and Mary Worthington Colton Boies, a teacher.

Orphaned at age 11, Boies was raised for the rest of her youth by her uncle and aunt, Frank and Abbie (Colton) Childs.

Boies was educated at the Mary Burnham School in Northampton, Massachusetts and the Lake Erie College for Women in Ohio, before graduating from Smith College in 1903. She pursued further studies in history at the University of Chicago, where she completed a master's degree in history in 1908. Boies attended some graduate classes at Columbia University during the 1908-09 academic year.

== Career ==
Cotton worked as a staff member of the YWCA from 1909 to 1940. By 1913, she was placed in charge of the department of personnel for the YWCA's Department of Method. She directed the organization's presence at the Panama–Pacific International Exposition in 1915, and in 1917 went to Russia, to establish YWCA educational programs for Russian women during the Provisional Government period. Boies and one other secretary established an association in Petrograd and in Moscow and worked with women's groups in other cities. They operated a shipboard exhibition along the Volga River in 1918, demonstrating improved nutrition, child care, and agricultural techniques to villagers.

When the Bolsheviks took control of Russia in 1919, Cotton escaped through Stockholm, but returned to northern Russia briefly, to set up canteens for American troops in Archangel. "She believes in the Russian people with an unshakable faith," reported a YWCA publication, after her return to the United States in 1919.

Cotton continued her work with the YWCA on a national level, organizing supports for working women. She testified at a Congressional hearing in favor of the Women's Bureau in 1920. She also promoted the YWCA's continuing interest in women's status in the Soviet Union after the revolution.

In 1921, Cotton was appointed foreign staff secretary, responsible for seeking out candidates for foreign service, planning their training, and supervising their work. Cotton was especially interested in women's rights, and supported organizations that promoted the welfare of women and children. She continued to work as a consultant for the YWCA up until 1945.

== Personal life ==
Bessie Boies married American YMCA worker Thomas Cotton in 1919; they met when both were working in Russia. They had two children, John Boies Cotton and Deborah Boies Cotton Leighton, and divorced in 1938. Her daughter Deborah remained active in the YWCA.

The artist Edna Boies Hopkins was Cotton's sister-in-law for two years, while Edna was married to Bessie's older brother John Henry Boies. They remained friends after John Henry Boies died in 1894.

== Death ==
Cotton died on April 23, 1959, aged 79 years, in Los Angeles, California.
