= Jefferson Township, Hillsdale County, Michigan =

Jefferson Township, Michigan
- Civil township
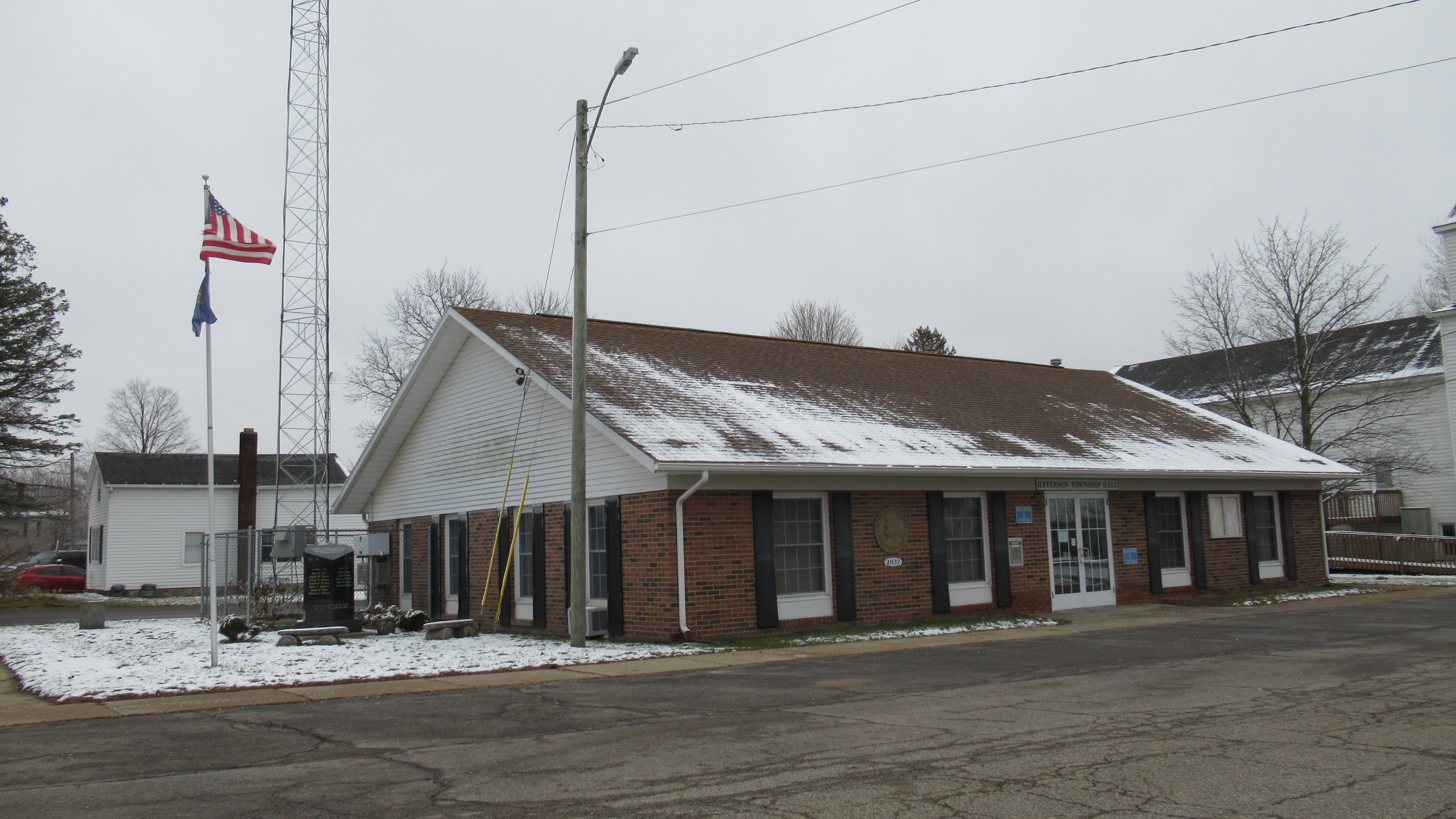
- Jefferson Township Hall in Osseo

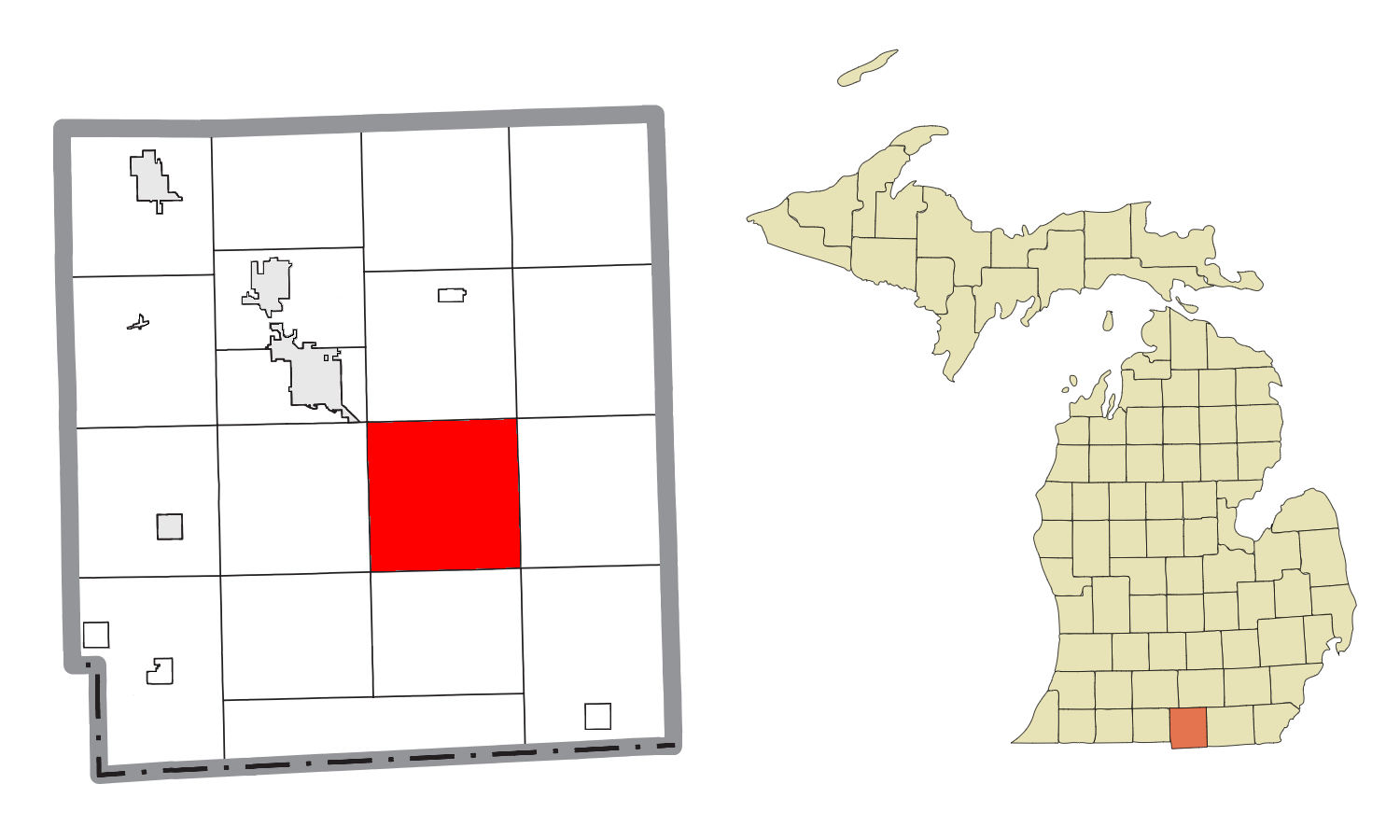
- Location within Hillsdale County

- Location within the state of Michigan Location within the United States
- Coordinates: 41°51′46″N 84°32′39″W
- Country: United States
- State: Michigan
- County: Hillsdale
- Established: 1837

Government
  - Supervisor: Steve Wismar
  - Clerk: Debbie Penney

Area
  - Total: 36.10 sq mi (93.50 km^{2})
  - Land: 35.49 sq mi (91.92 km^{2})
  - Water: 0.61 sq mi (1.58 km^{2})
- Elevation: 1,060 ft (323 m)

Population (2020)
  - Total: 3,063
  - Density: 86.3/sq mi (33.3/km^{2})
- Time zone: UTC-5 (Eastern (EST))
  - Summer (DST): UTC-4 (EDT)
- ZIP code(s): 49242 (Hillsdale); 49266 (Osseo); 49271 (Pittsford)
- Area code: 517
- FIPS code: 26-41620
- GNIS feature ID: 1626540
- Website: https://jeffersontwphcmi.gov/

Jefferson Township is a civil township of Hillsdale County in the U.S. state of Michigan. The population was 3,063 at the 2020 census.

== Communities ==
- Florida is a former settlement within the township. The township was originally named Florida Township when it was created in 1837, and it was renamed to Jefferson Township in 1849. A post office operated in Florida from July 23, 1839, until it was transferred to Osseo on December 14, 1861.
- Fountain Park is an unincorporated community located within the township at 41°49′53″N 84°31′45″W.
- Osseo is an unincorporated community located within the township along M-34 at 41°53′09″N 84°32′39″W.
- Pittsford is an unincorporated community and census-designated place on the boundary with Pittsford Township at 41°51′44″N 84°28′36″W.
- Shadyside is an unincorporated community located within the township at 41°49′22″N 84°32′11″W.

== History ==
The township was created by the state legislature in 1837, and it was originally called Florida Township. It was renamed to Jefferson Township in 1849.

== Geography ==
According to the U.S. Census Bureau, the township has a total area of 36.10 square miles (93.50 km^{2}), of which 35.49 square miles (91.92 km^{2}) is land and 0.61 square miles (1.58 km^{2}) (1.69%) is water.

The Lost Nation State Game Area is a 2,471-acre (10.00 km^{2}) state game area located mostly within Jefferson Township with a small portion extending east into Pittsford Township. The protected area is also known locally as Pittsford State Game Area.

=== Major highways ===
- M-34 enters the township from the east and has its western terminus at M-99
- M-99 enters the townships from the northwest and curves south at the junction within M-34.

== Demographics ==
As of the census of 2000, there were 3,141 people, 1,210 households, and 895 families residing in the township. The population density was 88.2 inhabitants per square mile (34.1/km^{2}). There were 1,569 housing units at an average density of 44.0 per square mile (17.0/km^{2}). The racial makeup of the township was 97.87% White, 0.25% African American, 0.45% Native American, 0.16% Asian, 0.41% from other races, and 0.86% from two or more races. Hispanic or Latino of any race were 0.83% of the population.

There were 1,210 households, out of which 32.6% had children under the age of 18 living with them, 60.6% were married couples living together, 8.7% had a female householder with no husband present, and 26.0% were non-families. 20.7% of all households were made up of individuals, and 7.9% had someone living alone who was 65 years of age or older. The average household size was 2.59 and the average family size was 2.99.

In the township the population was spread out, with 25.7% under the age of 18, 9.1% from 18 to 24, 28.1% from 25 to 44, 24.1% from 45 to 64, and 13.0% who were 65 years of age or older. The median age was 37 years. For every 100 females, there were 97.3 males. For every 100 females age 18 and over, there were 98.0 males.

The median income for a household in the township was $43,750, and the median income for a family was $51,786. Males had a median income of $34,266 versus $22,483 for females. The per capita income for the township was $17,484. About 4.0% of families and 5.3% of the population were below the poverty line, including 4.7% of those under age 18 and 3.4% of those age 65 or over.

== Education ==
The township is served by three separate public school districts. The majority of the township is served by Pittsford Area Schools. The northwest portion of the township is served by Hillsdale Community Schools, and a very small portion of the southwest corner of the township is served by Camden-Frontier Schools.

== Notable people ==
- Charles D. Luce, state representative and supervisor of Jefferson Township
- Silas A. Wade, state representative and supervisor of Jefferson Township

== Images ==
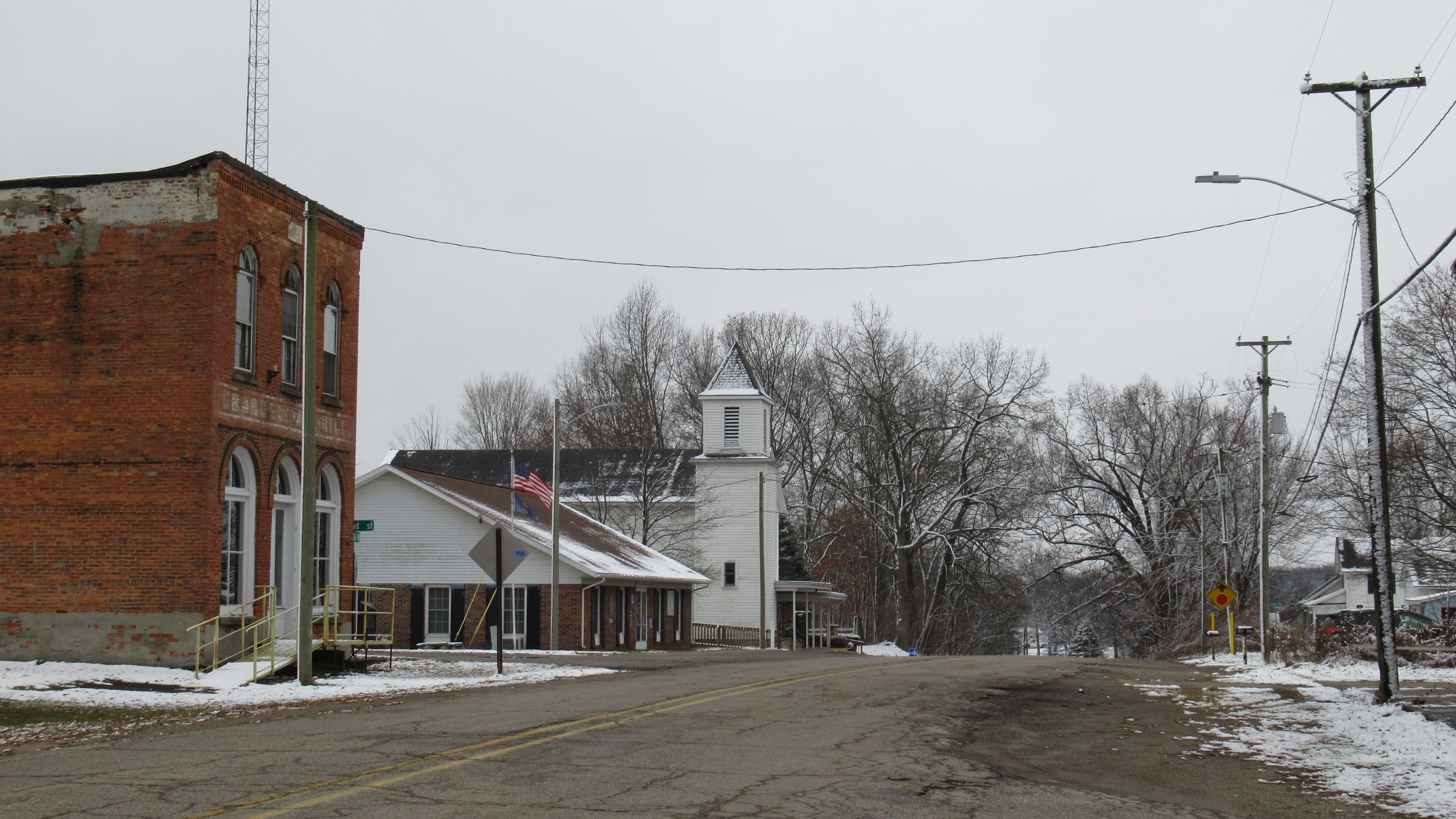
Unincorporated community of Osseo

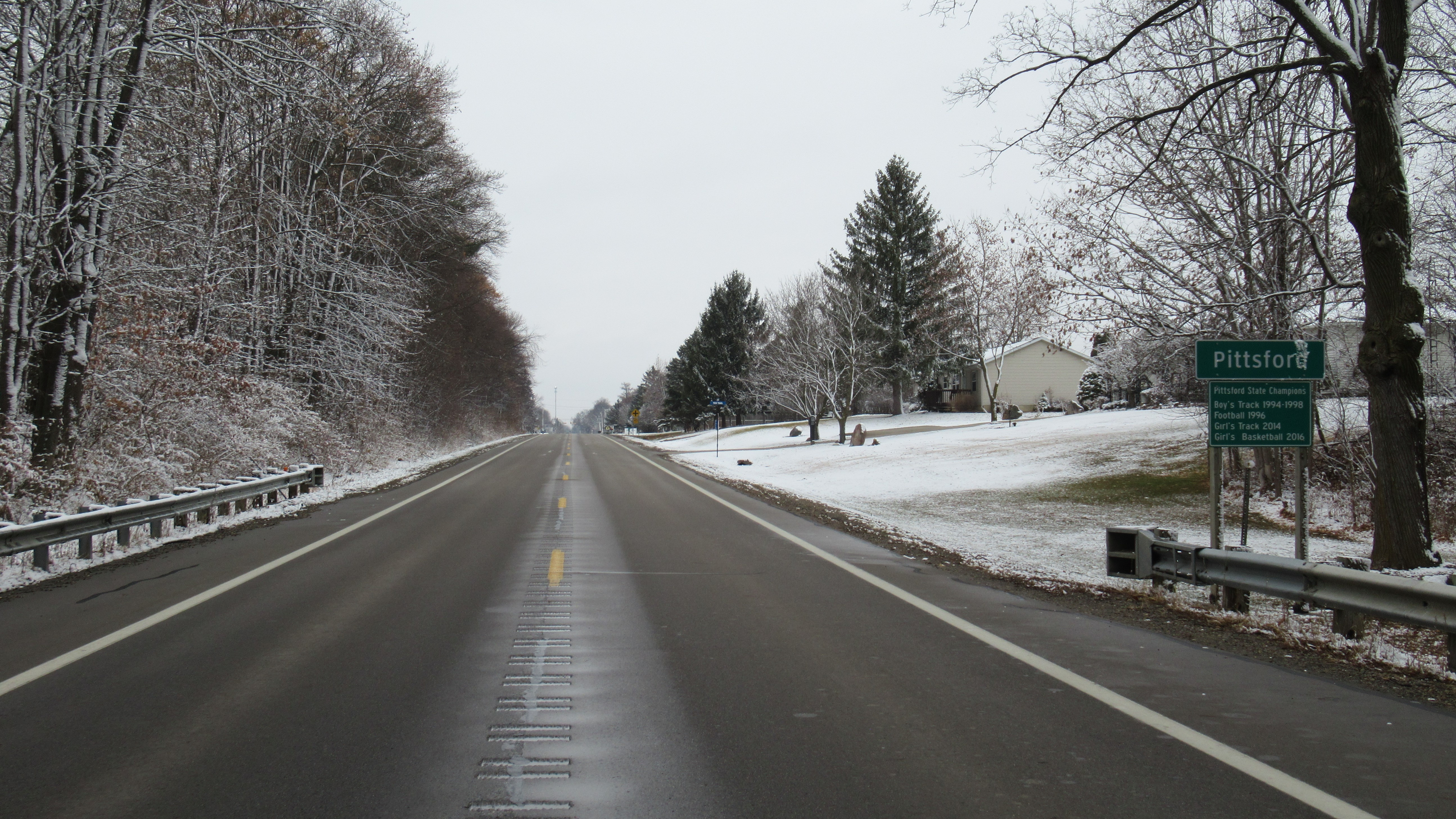
Unincorporated community of Pittsford

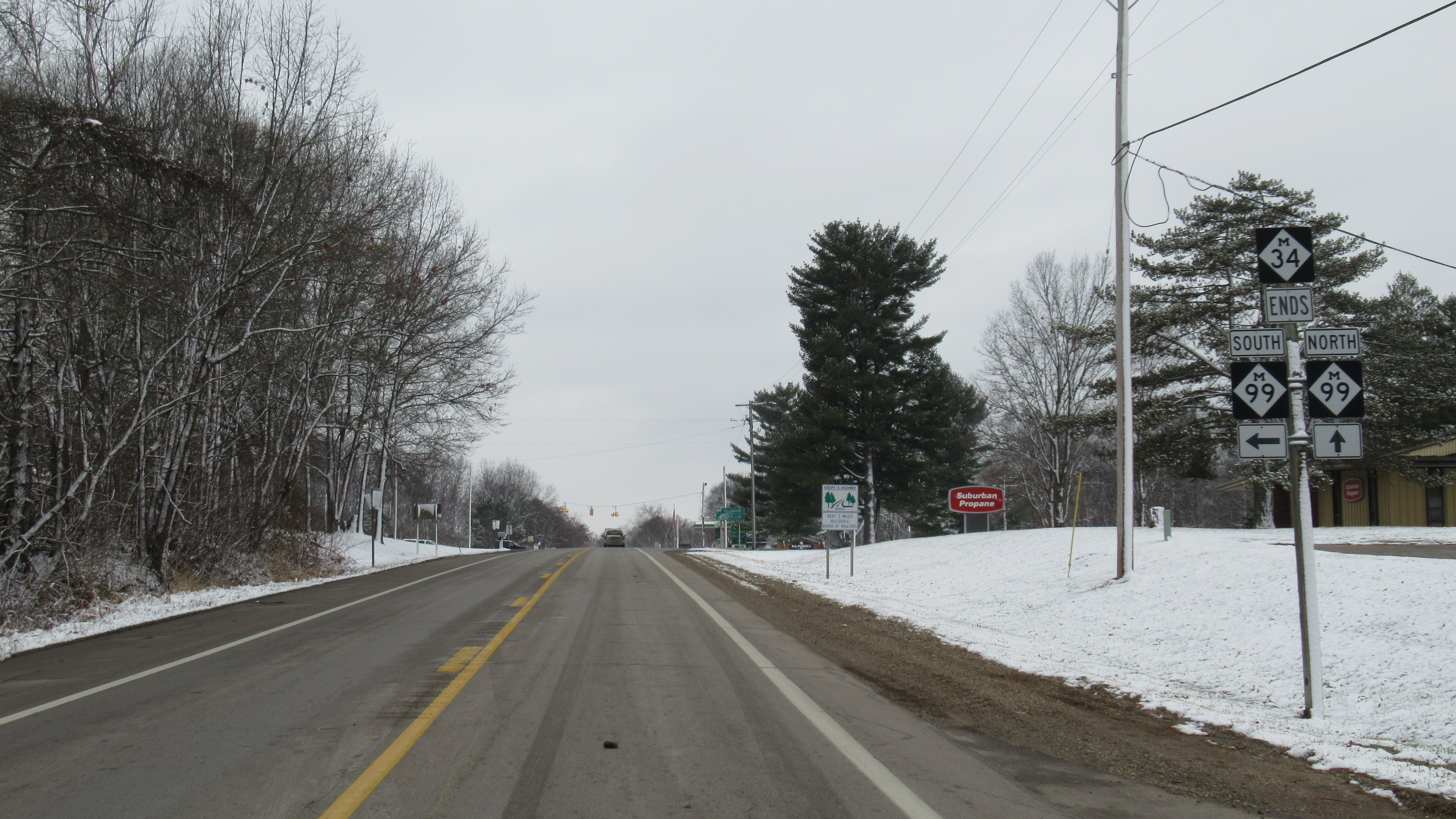
Western terminus of M-34 at M-99
