= Janet Kauffman =

American writer and environmental activist

Janet Kauffman (born June 10, 1945) is an American novelist, poet, and mixed media artist who has also been a civil rights, environmental, equal rights, peace, and social justice activist.

== Early life and education ==
Kauffman was born in Lancaster, Pennsylvania on June 10, 1945. She was raised on a tobacco farm in a predominantly Mennonite community in Lancaster County, Pennsylvania, where she says she was inspired at an early age by the social justice beliefs held by the residents she encountered there.

== Career ==
Kauffman later incorporated the beliefs she formulated in Lancaster, Pennsylvania into her written works and academic pedagogy, focussing on issues such as agricultural pollution, civil and equal rights, climate change, environmental ethics, risks to ecosystems, and the preservation of peace.

During the early part of her academic career, she received training in poetry writing, and became a published poet in her mid-30s. Kauffman then pursued her Doctor of Philosophy degree at the University of Chicago. After completing a dissertation on Theodore Roethke, she was awarded her degree in 1972.

Kauffman subsequently relocated to Michigan, where she became a member of the faculty of Jackson Community College and taught classes in creative writing, feminist studies, and literature. During this period of her life, she shifted her writing focus to fiction, and received critical acclaim for her first short story collection, Places in the World a Woman Could Walk. She also served as a visiting professor at the University of Michigan from 1985 to 1986.

A member of the English Department faculty at Eastern Michigan University (EMU) in Ypsilanti, Michigan, beginning in 1988, she continued to teach there until her retirement in 2008. Explaining her writing to Jean Jackman to the Detroit Free Press in 1989, Kauffman said:

You can't be a woman writer today without being a feminist writer, if that means attending to matters of order, matters of power. I think the excitement in fiction today is about changes in defining structure and order. All literature is political. It has to be, even when writers are trying not to make it so.

Since the 1980s, she has tended a farm near Hudson, Michigan, where she was a hay farmer for more than a decade before restoring her property's wetlands and securing a conservation easement. In 2001, she and fellow Hudson farm owner Lynn Henning organized a "tour de manure" to raise the public's awareness about the environmental threats posed by large-scale, industrial dairy farming operations. In 2019, she donated the majority of her property to the ACRES Land Trust to preserve the grasslands, stream, wetlands, and woods there with the goal of creating an environmental sanctuary for researchers and the general public.

== Bibliography ==
=== Poetry ===
Collections

- Writing Home, with Jerome McGann (Coldwater Press, 1978)
- The Weather Book (Texas Tech University Press, 1981)
- Where the World Is (Montparnasse Press, 1988)
- Five on Fiction (Burning Deck Press, 2004)
- oh corporeal (Coldwater Press, 2010)

=== Novels ===
- Collaborators (Knopf, 1986)
- The Body in Four Parts (Graywolf, 1994)
- Rot (New Issues, 2001)

=== Short fiction ===
Collections

- Places in the World a Woman Could Walk (Knopf, 1983)
- Obscene Gestures for Women (Knopf, 1989)
- Characters on the Loose (Graywolf, 1997)
- Trespassing: Dirt Stories & Field Notes (stories and essays) (Wayne State University Press, 2008)

Stories

Title	Year	First published	Reprinted/collected	Notes
Machinery	1986	Kauffman, Janet (April 14, 1986). "Machinery". The New Yorker. Vol. 62, no. 8. pp. 32–34.		

== Sources ==
- BookRags
