= Charles D. Luce =

American politician from Michigan

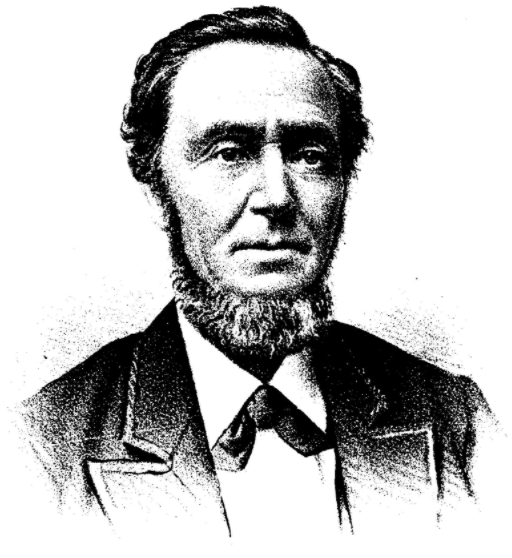

Member of the Michigan House of Representatives from the Hillsdale County 3rd district
- In office January 1, 1873 – December 31, 1874
- Preceded by: John M. Osborn
- Succeeded by: Leonidas Hubbard

Personal details
- Born: April 6, 1820 Arcadia, New York
- Died: October 11, 1887 (aged 67) Jefferson Township, Michigan
- Party: Republican

Charles D. Luce (April 6, 1820 – October 11, 1887) was a Michigan politician.

== Early life ==
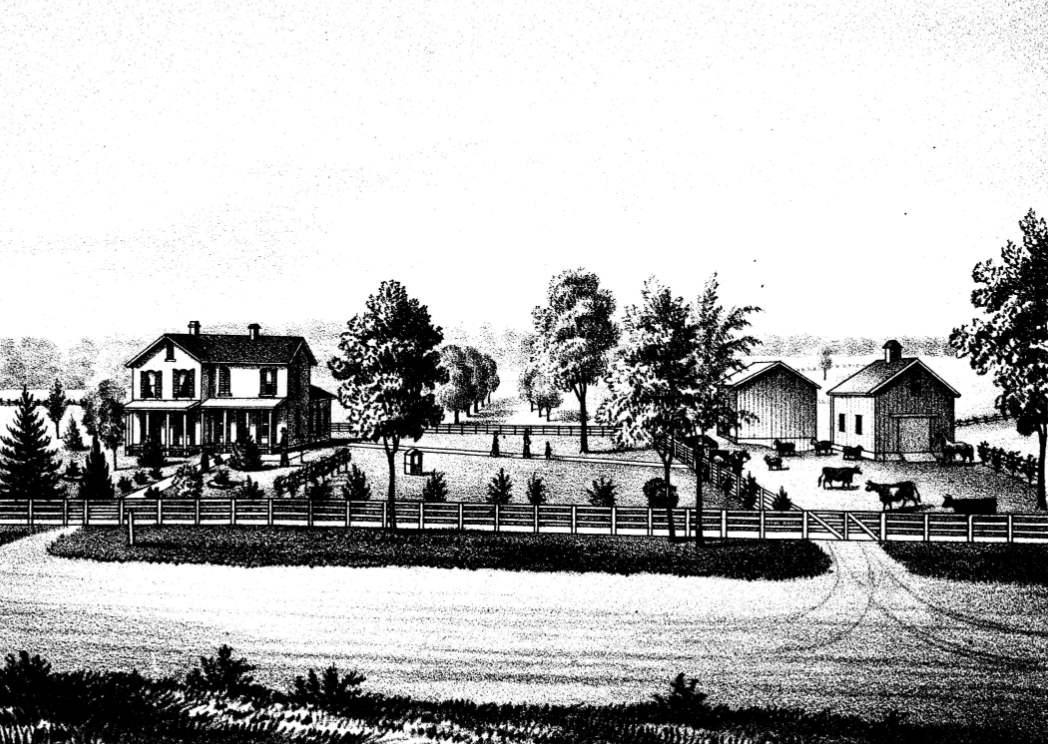
The Charles D. Luce Residence

Charles D. Luce was born on April 6, 1820, in Arcadia, New York. Charles was the fifth of twelve children of Joseph Luce and Betsey Soverhill. As a boy, he helped work on his parents' farm, and excelled in his district school. In 1846, Charles moved to Jefferson Township, Hillsdale County, Michigan, where he bought land. The land was initially undeveloped, but Charles constructed a farm there. He lived there until at least 1879.

== Career ==
Luce held many local offices in Jefferson Township. From 1851 to 1852, Luce served as supervisor of the township. In 1854, Luce served as a justice of the peace. From 1858 to 1859, he served as town treasurer. In 1860, Luce served as supervisor again. From 1865 to 1866, he served as town treasurer again. In 1867, he served as highway commissioner. In 1869 to 1871, Luce served again as supervisor. In the 1870's, Luce held the position of Farmers' Mutual Fire Insurance Company. On November 5, 1872, Luce was elected to the Michigan House of Representatives where he represented the Hillsdale County 3rd district from January 1, 1873, to December 31, 1874. From 1874 to 1877, Luce served his final terms as Jefferson Township supervisor.

== Personal life ==
In February 1850, Charles D. Luce married Miss Sylvia R. Brown. Together, they had one son, Ernest M. Luce. He was born in December 1850, in Erie County, Pennsylvania.

== Death ==
Luce died on October 11, 1887, in Jefferson Township.
