= Trunk Line Bridge No. 237 =

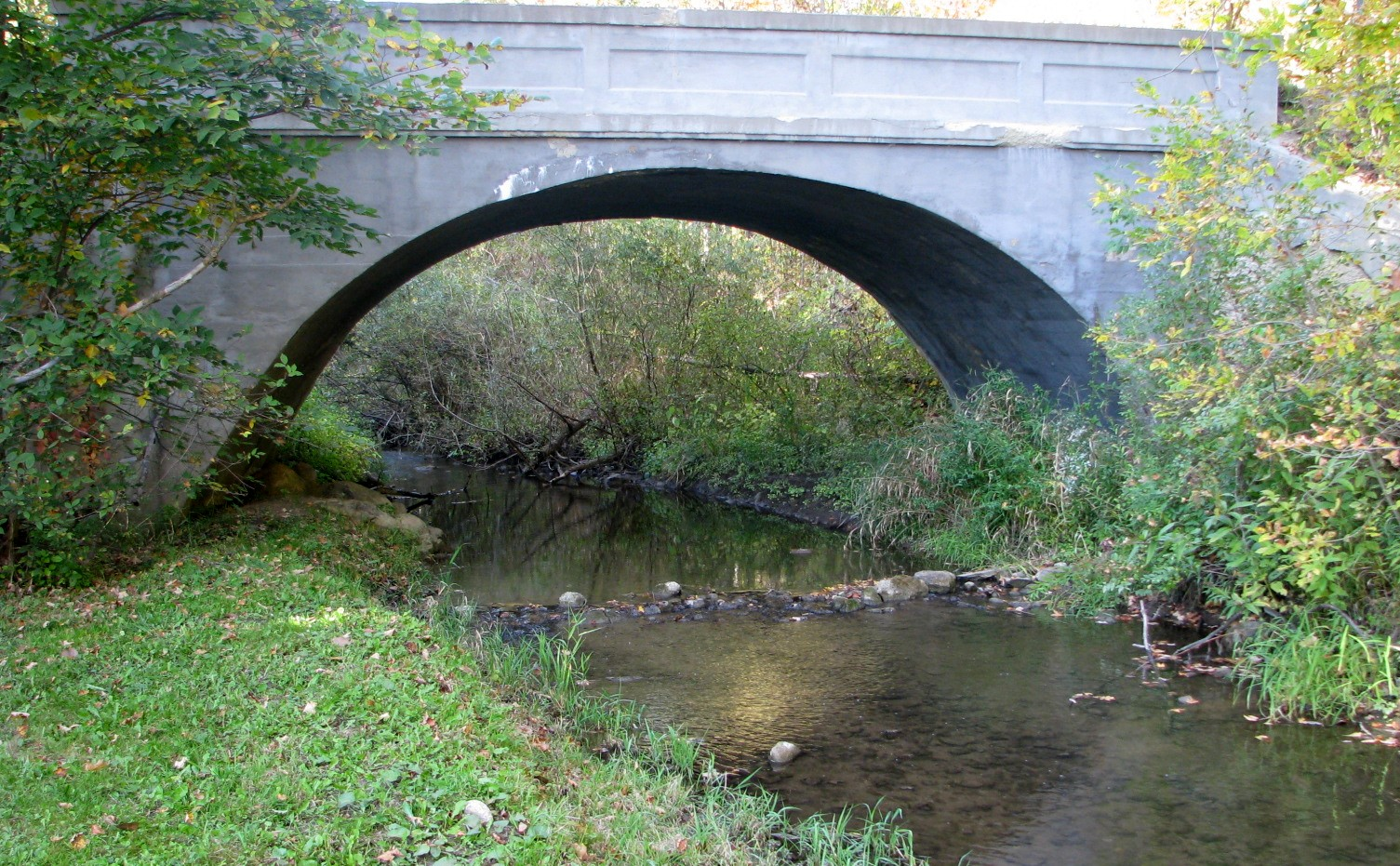
- Coordinates: 41.7697°N 84.5733°W

Characteristics
- Material: Concrete
- Total length: 36 feet (11 m)
- Width: 22 feet (6.7 m)
- Longest span: 31 feet (9.4 m)

Location
- Interactive map of Trunk Line Bridge No. 237

References
- Trunk Line Bridge No. 237
- U.S. National Register of Historic Places
- Location within Michigan Location within the United States
- Built: 1918
- NRHP reference No.: 99001672
- Added to NRHP: January 14, 2000

Trunk Line Bridge No. 237 is a concrete arch bridge in Ransom Township, Michigan, that carries Burt Road over Silver Creek. Built in 1918, it is listed on the National Register of Historic Places.

== History ==
A thoroughfare existed along the current route of Burt Road as early as 1894. By the time of the bridge's construction, this route formed part of the east-west State Highway No. 308. The bridge was built in 1918 by the Michigan State Highway Department according to a standard plan. The Pioneer, Ohio-based company Beighton and Spaulding served as contractor.

The bridge was listed on the National Register of Historic Places on January 14, 2000.

== Design and location ==
The bridge is a concrete, barrel vaulted deck arch bridge. Its single arch spans 31 feet (9.4 m) across Silver Creek. The bridge carries the unpaved Burt Road in a rural, wooded area of Ransom Township in Hillsdale County. The parapet railings are constructed of solid concrete and have five rectangular recesses on the inside and outside faces. At the southwest corner is affixed a bridge plate on the inside of the railing.

== See also ==
- List of bridges on the National Register of Historic Places in Michigan
- National Register of Historic Places listings in Hillsdale County, Michigan
