= Silas A. Wade =

American politician

Member of the Michigan House of Representatives from the Hillsdale County 3rd district
- In office January 7, 1857 – December 31, 1858
- Preceded by: Gideon G. King
- Succeeded by: William W. Brewster

Personal details
- Born: September 4, 1797 Morristown, New Jersey
- Died: February 19, 1869 (aged 71)
- Party: Republican

Silas A. Wade (September 4, 1797 – February 19, 1869) was a Michigan politician.

== Early life ==
Wade was born on September 4, 1797, in Morristown, New Jersey. In 1835, Wade moved to Rome, Michigan. In 1850, Wade moved to Jefferson Township, Michigan.

== Career ==
Wade was a millwright and a miller. On November 4, 1856, Wade was elected to the Michigan House of Representatives where he represented the Hillsdale County 3rd district from January 7, 1857, to December 31, 1858. In 1857, Wade served as overseer of the poor for Jefferson Township. After his time in the legislature, Wade continued to serve in the Jefferson Township local government. In 1859, Wade served as justice of the peace. In 1862, Wade served as township supervisor.

== Personal life ==
On December 30, 1818, Wade married Sally A. Beers. Together, they more than four children. In 1850, Sarah A. Beers died. On February 26, 1851, Wade married Betsey Barker in Hillsdale County.

== Death ==
Wade died on February 19, 1869.
