= WKMH =

Coordinates: 41.884°N 84.523°W

- Hudson, Michigan; United States
- Broadcast area
- Frequency: 102.5 MHz
- Branding: K-LOVE

Programming
- Format: Contemporary Christian

Ownership
- Owner: Educational Media Foundation

History
- First air date: 1995
- Former call signs: WAHU (1994–1995); WMXE (1995–2003); WBZV (2003–2023)
- Call sign meaning: We're K-LOVE Michigan - Hudson

Technical information
- Licensing authority: FCC
- Facility ID: 22650
- Class: A
- ERP: 6,000 watts
- HAAT: 100 meters (330 ft)

Links
- Public license information: Public file; LMS
- Webcast: Listen Live!
- Website: klove.com

WKMH (102.5 FM) is a radio station broadcasting a Contemporary Christian music format. Licensed to Hudson, Michigan, it first began broadcasting in 1995 under the WMXE call sign. WKMH primarily targets the Hillsdale area.

The 102.5 frequency has used satellite-delivered formats from Westwood One (formerly ABC Radio) throughout its history. When the station signed on as WMXE "Mix 102.5," it used the adult contemporary format known as "StarStation" (now "Hits & Favorites"), and later switched to the Hot AC format known as "Today's Best Hits". Later on, the station began airing the classic rock format, known as "The Classic Rock Experience", and presented themselves as "Buzz 102.5".

On December 23, 2022, it was announced by radioinsight.com that WBZV was sold to the Educational Media Foundation. The classic rock format remained dormant until May 2023, when the station became an affiliate of the K-LOVE network. Subsequently, the call sign was changed to WKMH on May 10, 2023, coincident with the consummation of the sale of the station.
