= M-34 (Michigan highway) =

State highway in Hillsdale and Lenawee counties in Michigan, United States

M-34
- M-34 highlighted in red

Route information
- Maintained by MDOT
- Length: 28.938 mi (46.571 km)
- Existed: c. July 1, 1919–present

Major junctions
- West end: M-99 at Osseo
- US 127 in Hudson; M-156 in Clayton
- East end: Bus. US 223 / M-52 at Adrian

Location
- Country: United States
- State: Michigan
- Counties: Hillsdale, Lenawee

Highway system
- Michigan State Trunkline Highway System; Interstate; US; State; Byways
| ← M-33 | → M-35 |

M-34 is an east–west state trunkline highway in the southeastern region of the US state of Michigan. It has a western terminus near Osseo on M-99 and runs through forest and farm lands to its eastern terminus at Business US Highway 223 (BUS US 223) and M-52 in Adrian. The highway serves a number of smaller communities in the area and intersects two US Highways while carrying between 4,200 and 11,300 vehicles on a daily basis.

M-34 was designated and signed with the beginning of the state highway system around July 1, 1919, along a route that extended to either end of its current routing. These western and eastern extensions were added to other highways during the 1920s, shortening M-34 to roughly its current length. A few more changes were made in the mid-1950s and 1960s resulting in the modern routing. M-34 has a short, unsigned sibling, Connector 34, which is better known as Industrial Drive in the Adrian area.

== Route description ==
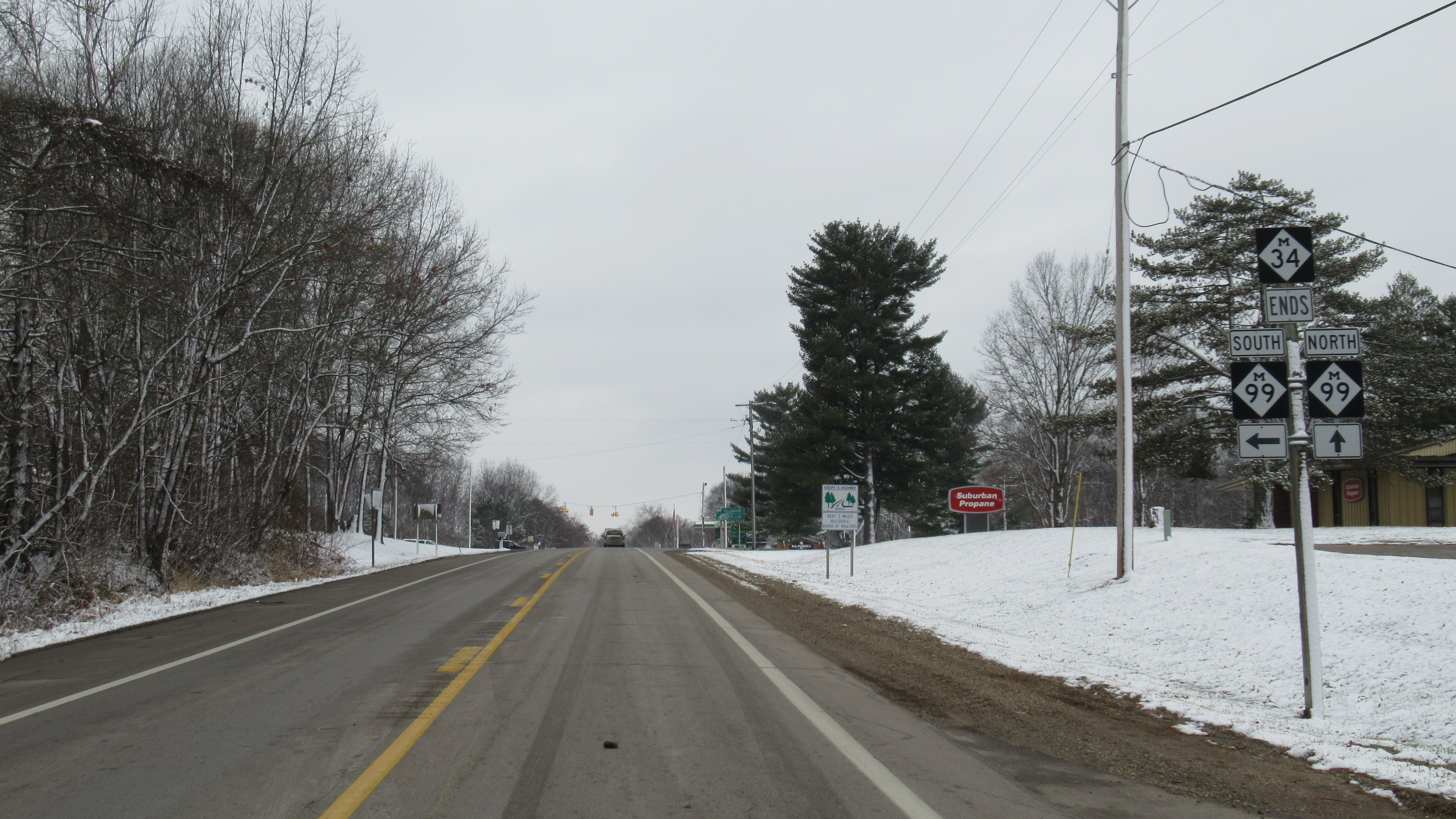
M-34 western terminus, Osseo

M-34 begins at an intersection with M-99 just west of Osseo. M-99 approaches Osseo from the west along Hudson Road and where M-99 turns south along Pioneer Road, M-34 continues east along Hudson Road. The highway turns to the southeast to the south of Osseo near Deer Lake and continues towards Pittsford. Hudson Road runs through a mix of forests and local farms. The trunkline passes to the south of the main business district in Pittsford. East of town, the highway turns east and intersects US Highway 127 (US 127) at the Hillsdale–Lenawee county line in Hudson. The trunkline continues eastward through the city of Hudson as Main Street. On the eastern edge of town, it becomes Carleton Road and passes through more farmland. Just south of Clayton, M-34 has a junction with the northern terminus of M-156, a connector highway that runs south into Ohio and US 20.

Approximately four miles (6.4 km) east of that junction, M-34 turns north for about two miles (3.2 km) along Benner Highway and passes through the community of Cadmus. At the end of its course along Benner Highway, M-34 turns east towards Adrian on Beecher Road. There are some residential subdivisions along the road on the southwest side of Adrian. M-34 intersects Industrial Drive and crosses US 223 and Beecher Road becomes Beecher Street in town. The trunkline continues east and terminates at the intersection of Beecher and Main streets where it meets BUS US 223/M-52.

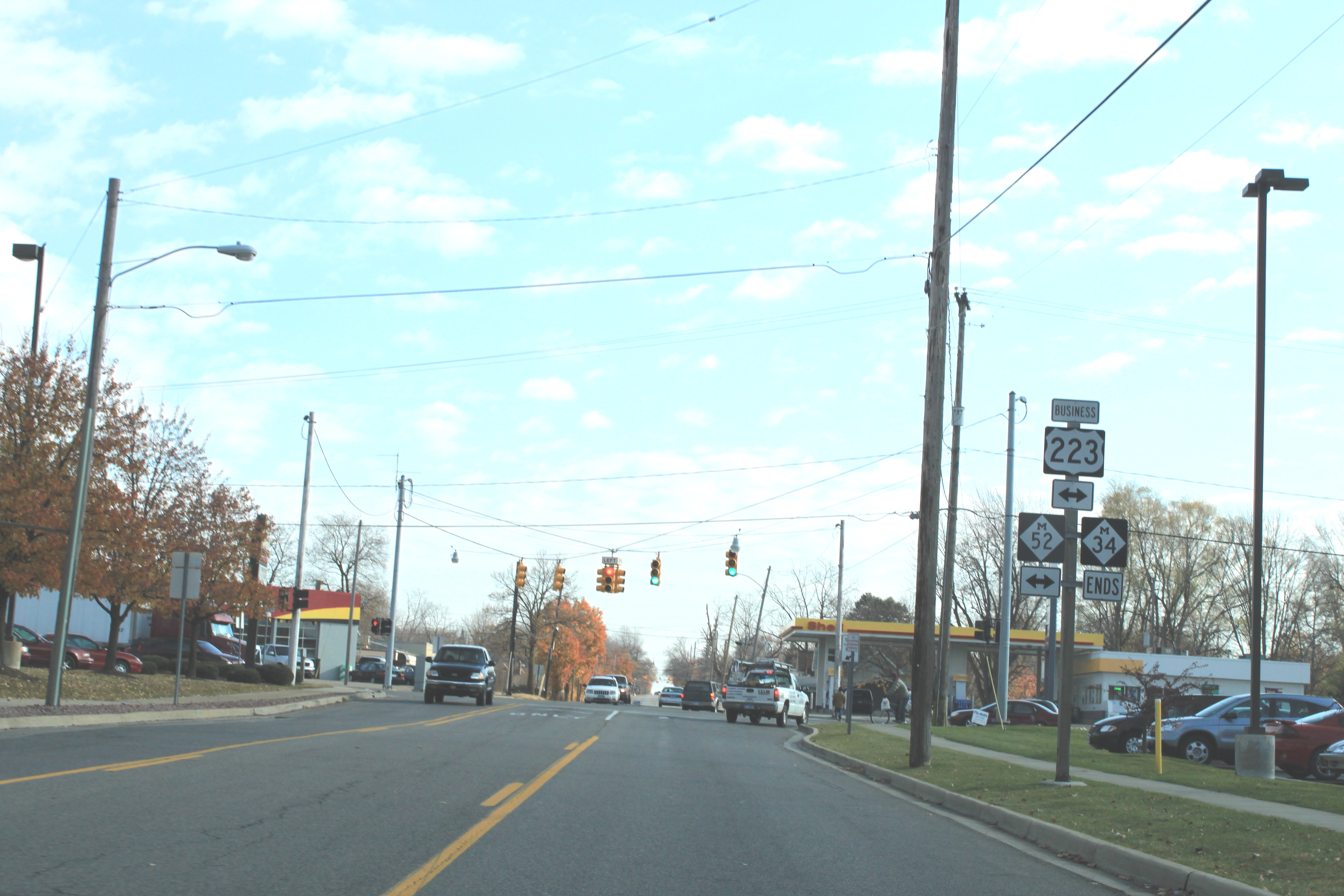
M-34 eastern terminus, Adrian

M-34 is maintained by the Michigan Department of Transportation (MDOT) like other state highways in Michigan. As a part of these maintenance responsibilities, the department tracks the volume of traffic that uses the roadways under its jurisdiction. These volumes are expressed using a metric called annual average daily traffic, which is a statistical calculation of the average daily number of vehicles on a segment of roadway. MDOT's surveys in 2010 showed that the highest traffic levels along M-34 were the 11,302 vehicles daily immediately east of the BUS US 223/M-52 junction in Adrian; the lowest counts were the 4,166 vehicles per day between Hudson and the M-156 junction. No section of M-34 has been listed on the National Highway System, a network of roads important to the country's economy, defense, and mobility.

== History ==
When the state highway system was signed around July 1, 1919, M-34 started in Jonesville at an intersection with M-23 along the present-day alignment of M-99. The highway ran to Adrian along its present route and continued southeasterly along present-day US 223 through Blissfield, where it terminated at the Ohio state line near Sylvania, Ohio. In 1924, the western terminus of the highway was extended to Homer where it terminated at M-60. Just a few years later, in 1926, the western terminus was truncated, to end at Hillsdale, with the remainder to Jonesville becoming an extension of the M-64 of the day. At the same time, the eastern segment of M-34 from Adrian to the border was assumed into the US 127 corridor, therefore, scaling the terminus back to US 127 (now US 223).

Industrial Drive Connector 34
- Location: Adrian
- Length: 0.366 mi (589 m)
- Existed: 2003–present

In 1954, a new US 223 bypass was built around Adrian, resulting in the relocation of M-34 to end at BUS US 223/M-52. Finally, in 1966, when a new alignment of M-99 highway was opened, the western terminus of M-34 was scaled back to end at the new highway near Osseo. In 2003, the short connector between M-34 and US 223 was abandoned and obliterated. Industrial Drive, which is known internally at MDOT as Connector 34, is a new connector between the two highways that was assumed into the state trunkline system at the same time.

== Major intersections ==
| County | Location | mi | km | Destinations | Notes |
|---|---|---|---|---|---|
| Hillsdale | Jefferson Township | 0.000 | 0.000 | M-99 – Hillsdale, Pioneer | |
| Hillsdale– Lenawee | Hudson | 10.631 | 17.109 | US 127 – Jackson, State Line | |
| Lenawee | Clayton | 17.018 | 27.388 | M-156 south – Morenci | Northern terminus of M-156 |
| Lenawee | Adrian | 27.783 | 44.712 | Industrial Drive to US 223 | Indirect access to US 223 via Industrial Drive (unsigned Connector 34) |
| Lenawee | Adrian | 28.938 | 46.571 | Bus. US 223 / M-52 – Downtown Adrian | |
1.000 mi = 1.609 km; 1.000 km = 0.621 mi
