= Pittsford, Michigan =

- Census-designated place (CDP) & unincorporated community
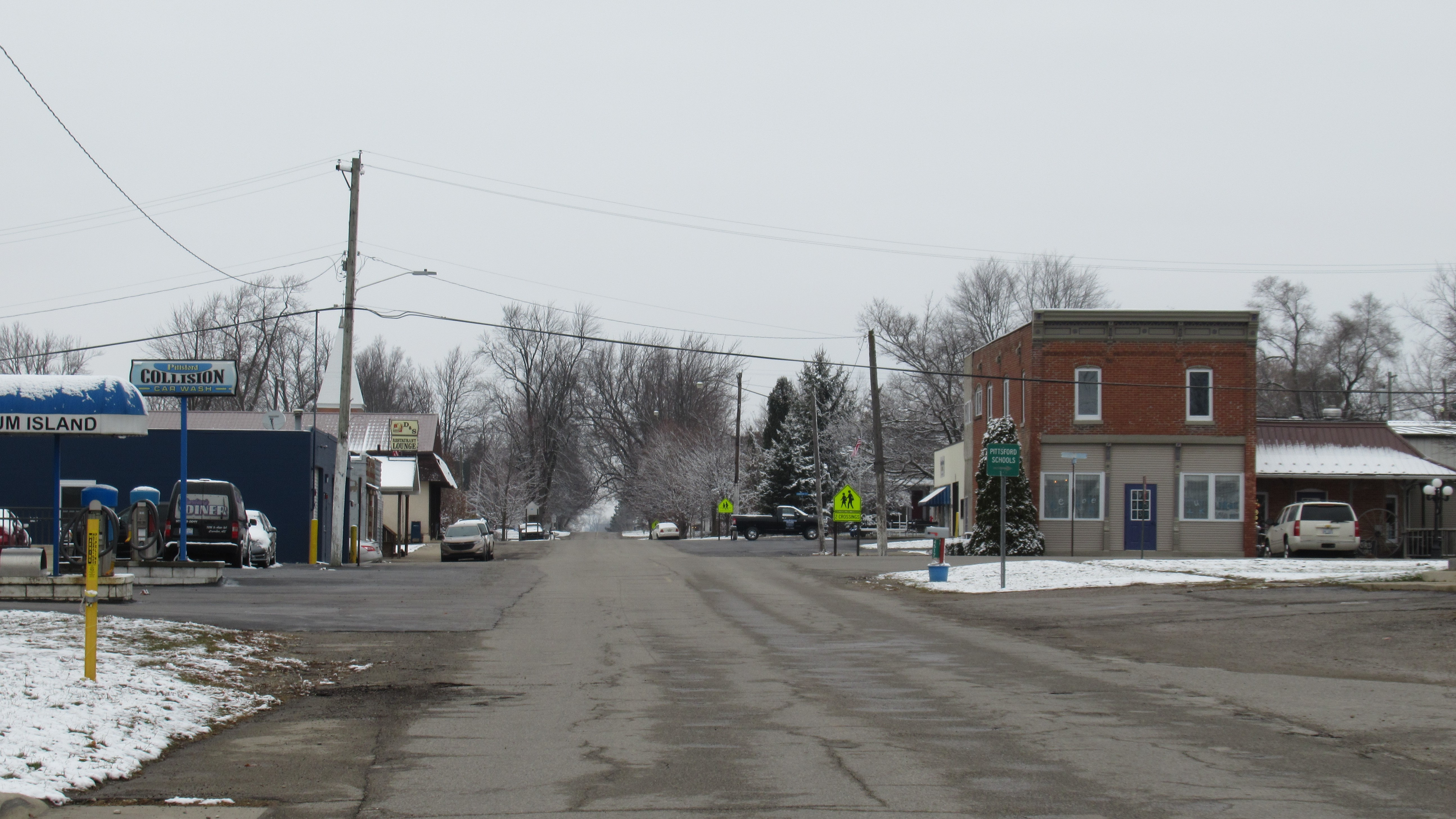
- Looking south along Pittsford Road

- Location within the state of Michigan Location within the United States
- Coordinates: 41°51′43″N 84°28′35″W
- Country: United States
- State: Michigan
- County: Hillsdale
- Townships: Jefferson and Pittsford
- Settled: 1833

Area
  - Total: 1.91 sq mi (4.95 km^{2})
  - Land: 1.91 sq mi (4.95 km^{2})
  - Water: 0 sq mi (0.00 km^{2})
- Elevation: 1,092 ft (333 m)

Population (2020)
  - Total: 553
  - Density: 290.2/sq mi (112.04/km^{2})
- Time zone: UTC-5 (Eastern (EST))
  - Summer (DST): UTC-4 (EDT)
- ZIP code(s): 49271
- Area code: 517
- FIPS code: 26-64600
- GNIS feature ID: 635063

Pittsford is an unincorporated community and census-designated place (CDP) located in Hillsdale County, Michigan. As of the 2020 census the population of the CDP was 553. The community is situated along M-34, straddling the border between Jefferson Township to the west and Pittsford Township to the east.

As an unincorporated community, Pittsford lacks legal autonomy but does have its own post office, which serves the 49271 ZIP Code.

== History ==
The area was first settled in 1833 when Hiram Kidler moved to the region. Originally known as Locust Corners, the community was renamed Pittsford by Alpheus Pratt, who had moved from Pittsford, New York. A post office under the name Pittsford opened on September 19, 1840. Although the post office was temporarily closed from September 12 to December 3, 1845, it was later relocated to the western part of Pittsford Township and renamed Sparta on January 4, 1846. In turn, the nearby Keene post office was transferred and renamed Pittsford on January 30, 1846. The community later became home to a station along the Lake Shore and Michigan Southern Railway.

In the 2020 census, Pittsford was newly listed as a census-designated place, included for statistical purposes only. Pittsford remains an unincorporated community with no legal autonomy.

== Geography ==
According to the U.S. Census Bureau, the CDP has a total area of 1.91 square miles (4.95 km^{2}), all land.

The community is served by Pittsford Area Schools, which also serves portions of several adjacent townships.

== Demographics ==
Historical population
Census	Pop.	Note	%±
2020	553		—
U.S. Decennial Census

== Images ==
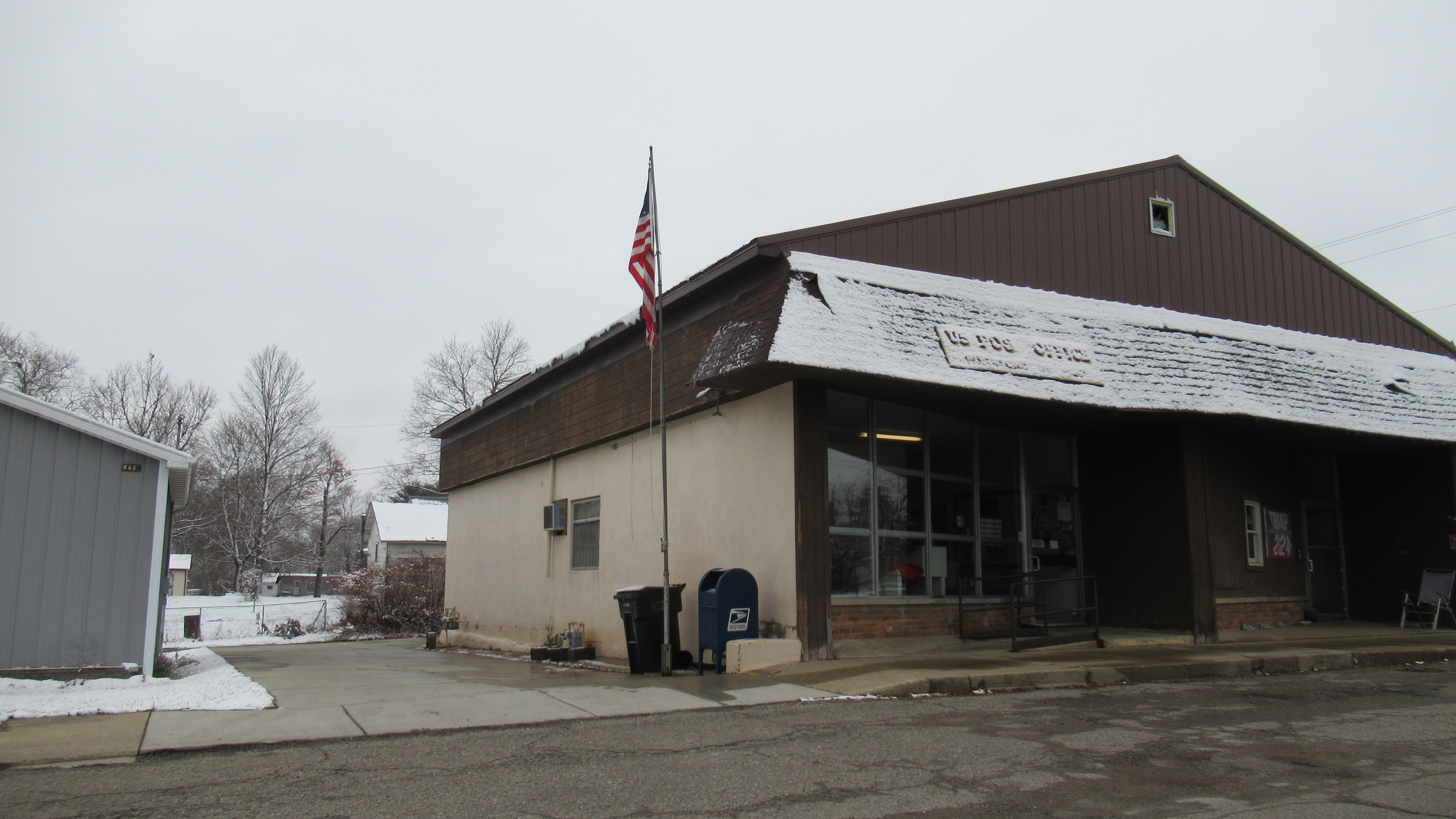
U.S. Post Office in Pittsford

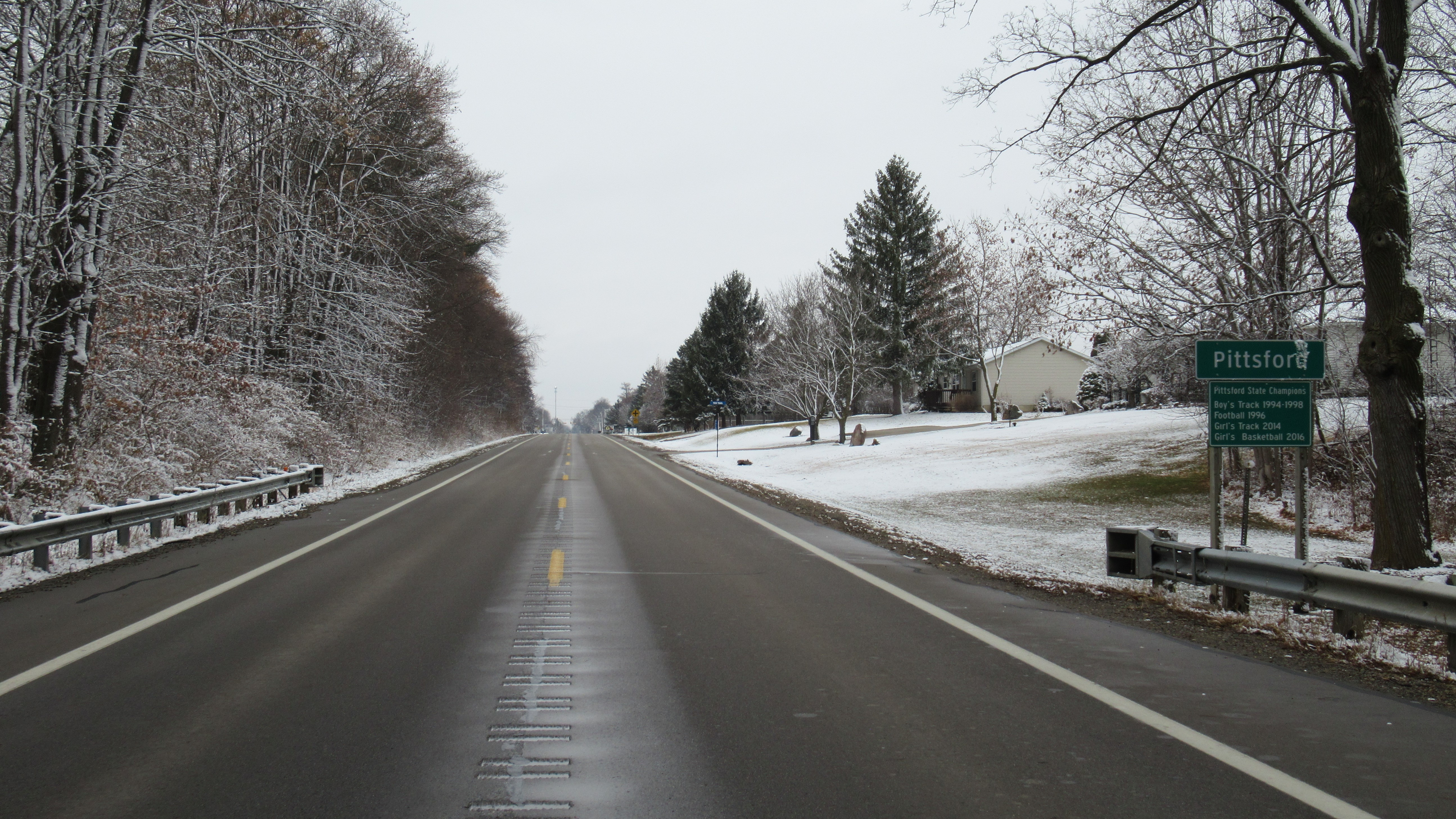
Signage along eastbound M-34
