= Hudson, Michigan =

- City
- City of Hudson
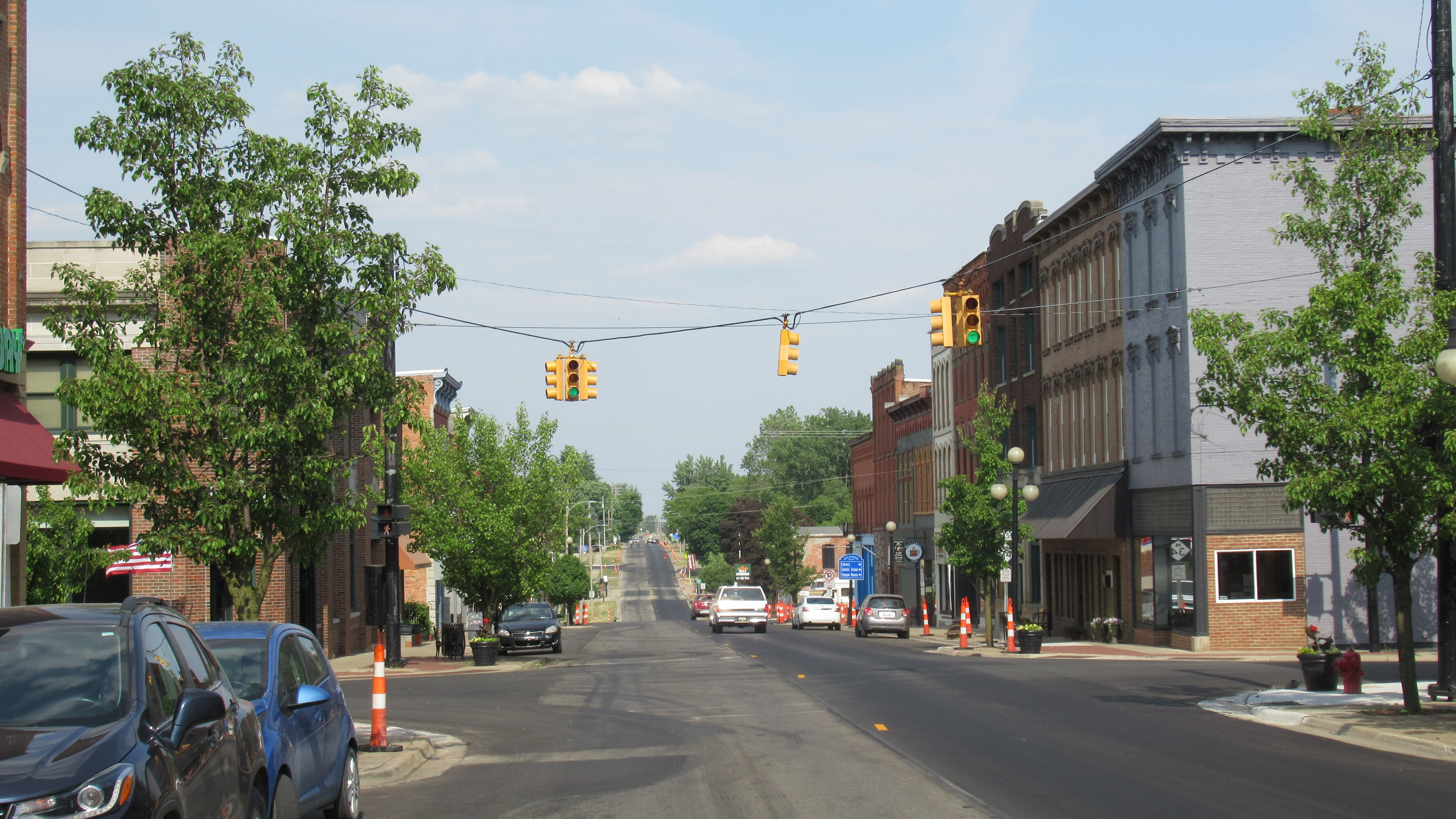
- Downtown Hudson along Main Street (M-34)
- Motto(s): Small town, big heart
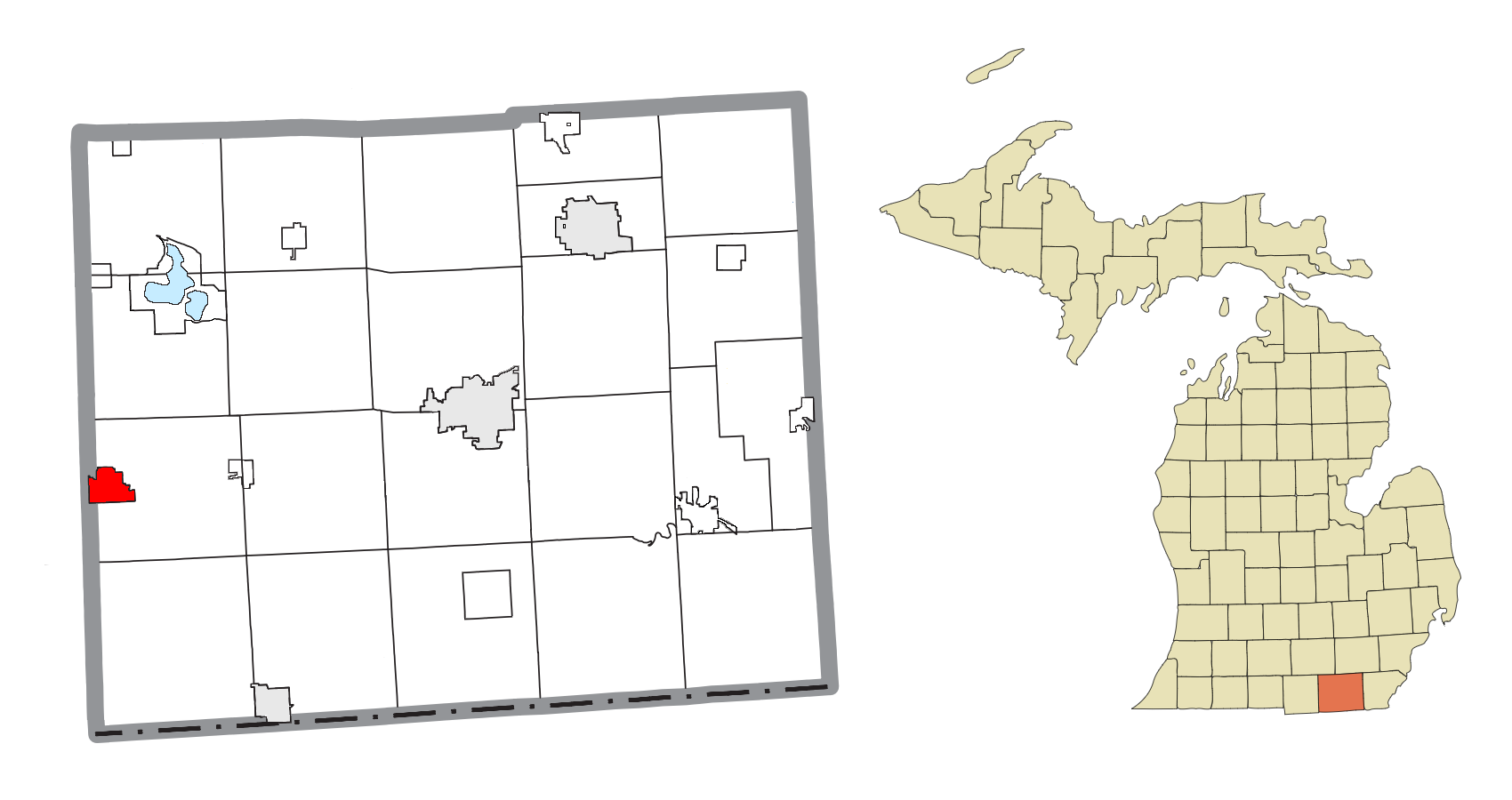
- Location within Lenawee County

- Location within the state of Michigan Location within the United States
- Coordinates: 41°51′23″N 84°21′04″W
- Country: United States
- State: Michigan
- County: Lenawee
- Settled: 1833
- Incorporated: 1893

Government
  - Type: Council–manager
  - Mayor: Daniel Schudel
  - Manager: Charles Weir
  - Treasurer: Brandon Hudson

Area
  - Total: 2.20 sq mi (5.69 km^{2})
  - Land: 2.19 sq mi (5.68 km^{2})
  - Water: 0.0039 sq mi (0.01 km^{2})
- Elevation: 915 ft (279 m)

Population (2020)
  - Total: 2,415
  - Density: 1,102/sq mi (425.3/km^{2})
- Time zone: UTC-5 (Eastern (EST))
  - Summer (DST): UTC-4 (EDT)
- ZIP code(s): 49247
- Area code: 517
- FIPS code: 26-39720
- GNIS feature ID: 0628761
- Website: Official website

Hudson is a city in Lenawee County in the U.S. state of Michigan. The population was 2,415 at the 2020 census. The city is mostly surrounded by Hudson Township, but the two are administered autonomously.

== History ==
Hudson was named for Dr. Daniel Hudson, an original landowner. The city's motto is "Small Town Big Heart."

== Geography ==
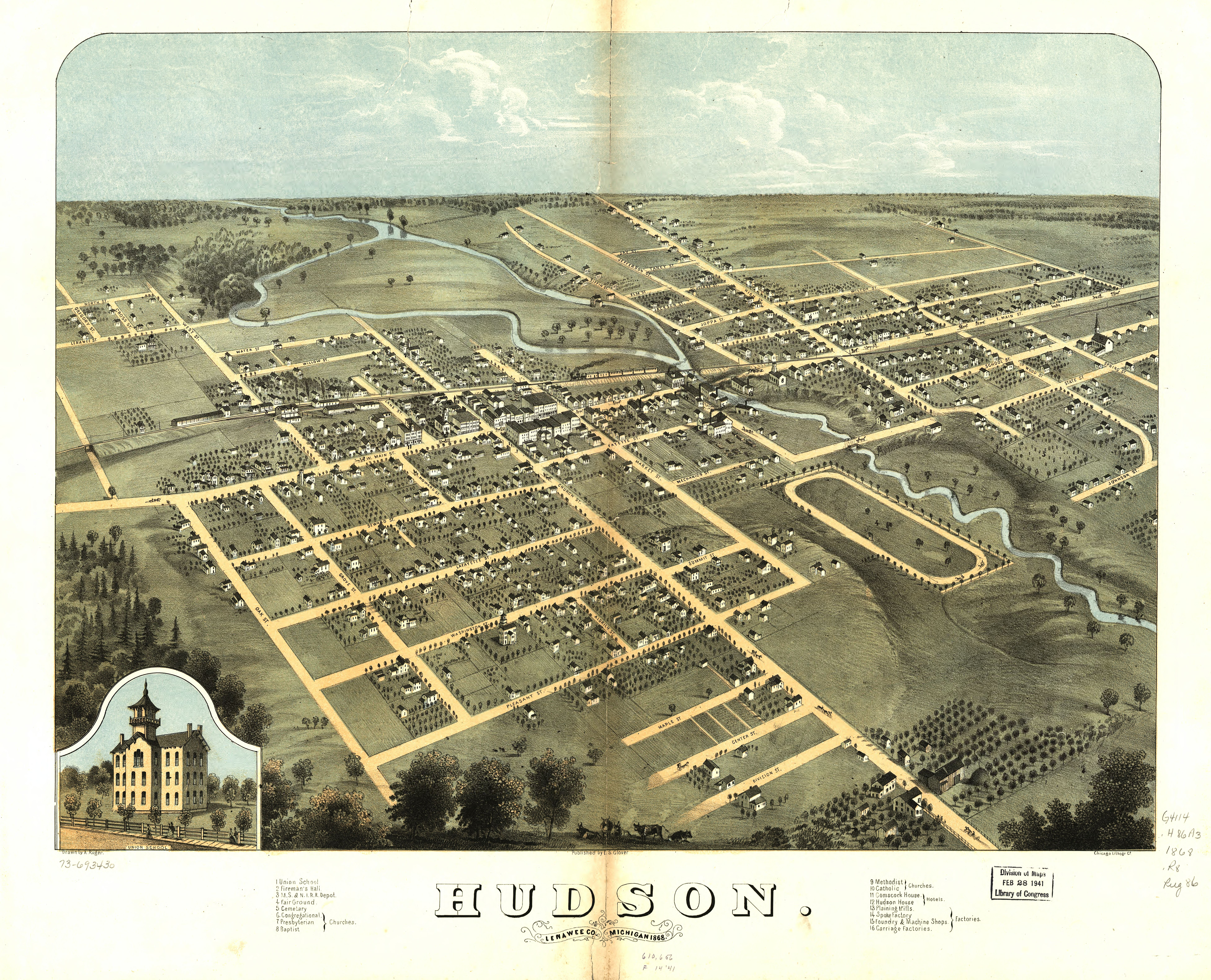
Panoramic map of Hudson from 1868 with an image of Union School inset and a listing of area sites

According to the United States Census Bureau, the city has a total area of 2.20 square miles (5.70 km^{2}), of which 2.19 square miles (5.67 km^{2}) is land and 0.01 square miles (0.03 km^{2}) is water.

=== Major highways ===
- M-34 (Main Street) runs through downtown Hudson.
- US 127 intersects M-34 on the western border.

== Demographics ==
Historical population
Census	Pop.	Note	%±
1860	1,489		—
1870	2,450		64.5%
1880	2,254		−8.0%
1890	2,178		−3.4%
1900	2,403		10.3%
1910	2,178		−9.4%
1920	2,464		13.1%
1930	2,361		−4.2%
1940	2,426		2.8%
1950	2,773		14.3%
1960	2,546		−8.2%
1970	2,618		2.8%
1980	2,545		−2.8%
1990	2,580		1.4%
2000	2,499		−3.1%
2010	2,307		−7.7%
2020	2,415		4.7%
U.S. Decennial Census

=== 2020 census ===
As of the 2020 census, Hudson had a population of 2,415. The median age was 34.1 years. 28.3% of residents were under the age of 18 and 13.0% of residents were 65 years of age or older. For every 100 females there were 96.5 males, and for every 100 females age 18 and over there were 91.6 males age 18 and over.

0.0% of residents lived in urban areas, while 100.0% lived in rural areas.

There were 891 households in Hudson, of which 35.9% had children under the age of 18 living in them. Of all households, 42.2% were married-couple households, 19.5% were households with a male householder and no spouse or partner present, and 28.3% were households with a female householder and no spouse or partner present. About 28.2% of all households were made up of individuals and 10.1% had someone living alone who was 65 years of age or older.

There were 974 housing units, of which 8.5% were vacant. The homeowner vacancy rate was 2.0% and the rental vacancy rate was 4.0%.

Racial composition as of the 2020 census
Race	Number	Percent
White	2,204	91.3%
Black or African American	22	0.9%
American Indian and Alaska Native	6	0.2%
Asian	9	0.4%
Native Hawaiian and Other Pacific Islander	0	0.0%
Some other race	21	0.9%
Two or more races	153	6.3%
Hispanic or Latino (of any race)	148	6.1%

=== 2010 census ===
As of the census of 2010, there were 2,307 people, 861 households, and 599 families residing in the city. The population density was 1,053.4 inhabitants per square mile (406.7/km^{2}). There were 1,019 housing units at an average density of 465.3 per square mile (179.7/km^{2}). The racial makeup of the city was 96.2% White, 0.7% African American, 0.5% Native American, 0.3% Asian, 0.3% from other races, and 1.9% from two or more races. Hispanic or Latino of any race were 4.2% of the population.

There were 861 households, of which 40.3% had children under the age of 18 living with them, 48.7% were married couples living together, 15.6% had a female householder with no husband present, 5.3% had a male householder with no wife present, and 30.4% were non-families. 27.1% of all households were made up of individuals, and 9.2% had someone living alone who was 65 years of age or older. The average household size was 2.63 and the average family size was 3.16.

The median age in the city was 33.4 years. 29.5% of residents were under the age of 18; 9.2% were between the ages of 18 and 24; 25.7% were from 25 to 44; 25% were from 45 to 64; and 10.7% were 65 years of age or older. The gender makeup of the city was 49.0% male and 51.0% female.

=== 2000 census ===
In 2000 the population density was 1,155.4 inhabitants per square mile (446.1/km^{2}). There were 1,019 housing units at an average density of 471.1 per square mile (181.9/km^{2}). The racial makeup of the city was 96.28% White, 0.32% African American, 0.20% Native American, 0.64% Asian, 0.84% from other races, and 1.72% from two or more races. Hispanic or Latino of any race were 2.16% of the population.

There were 929 households, out of which 38.9% had children under the age of 18 living with them, 52.6% were married couples living together, 14.1% had a female householder with no husband present, and 29.9% were non-families. 24.1% of all households were made up of individuals, and 10.1% had someone living alone who was 65 years of age or older. The average household size was 2.65 and the average family size was 3.15.

In the city, the population was spread out, with 29.7% under the age of 18, 9.4% from 18 to 24, 30.8% from 25 to 44, 19.2% from 45 to 64, and 10.9% who were 65 years of age or older. The median age was 32 years. For every 100 females, there were 91.9 males. For every 100 females age 18 and over, there were 84.4 males.

The median income for a household in the city was $41,122, and the median income for a family was $43,011. Males had a median income of $32,946 versus $23,679 for females. The per capita income for the city was $16,340. About 4.9% of families and 8.0% of the population were below the poverty line, including 8.2% of those under age 18 and 7.2% of those age 65 or over.

== Media ==
=== Newspaper ===
The city is served by the Hudson Post-Gazette newspaper. The paper's lineage dates to 1858, when W. T. B. Schermerhorn founded the Hudson Gazette. In March 1919, the Gazette merged with the Hudson Post to form the Hudson Post-Gazette. In 2018, local retiree Barbara Ireland purchased the paper to rescue it from closing.

=== Radio ===
- WKMH 102.5FM

== Notable people ==
- Will Carleton, poet
- Bessie Boies Cotton, YMCA worker in Russia 1917–1919
- Edna Boies Hopkins, artist
- Janet Kauffman, poet, novelist, and environmental activist
