= Frontier, Michigan =

- Unincorporated community
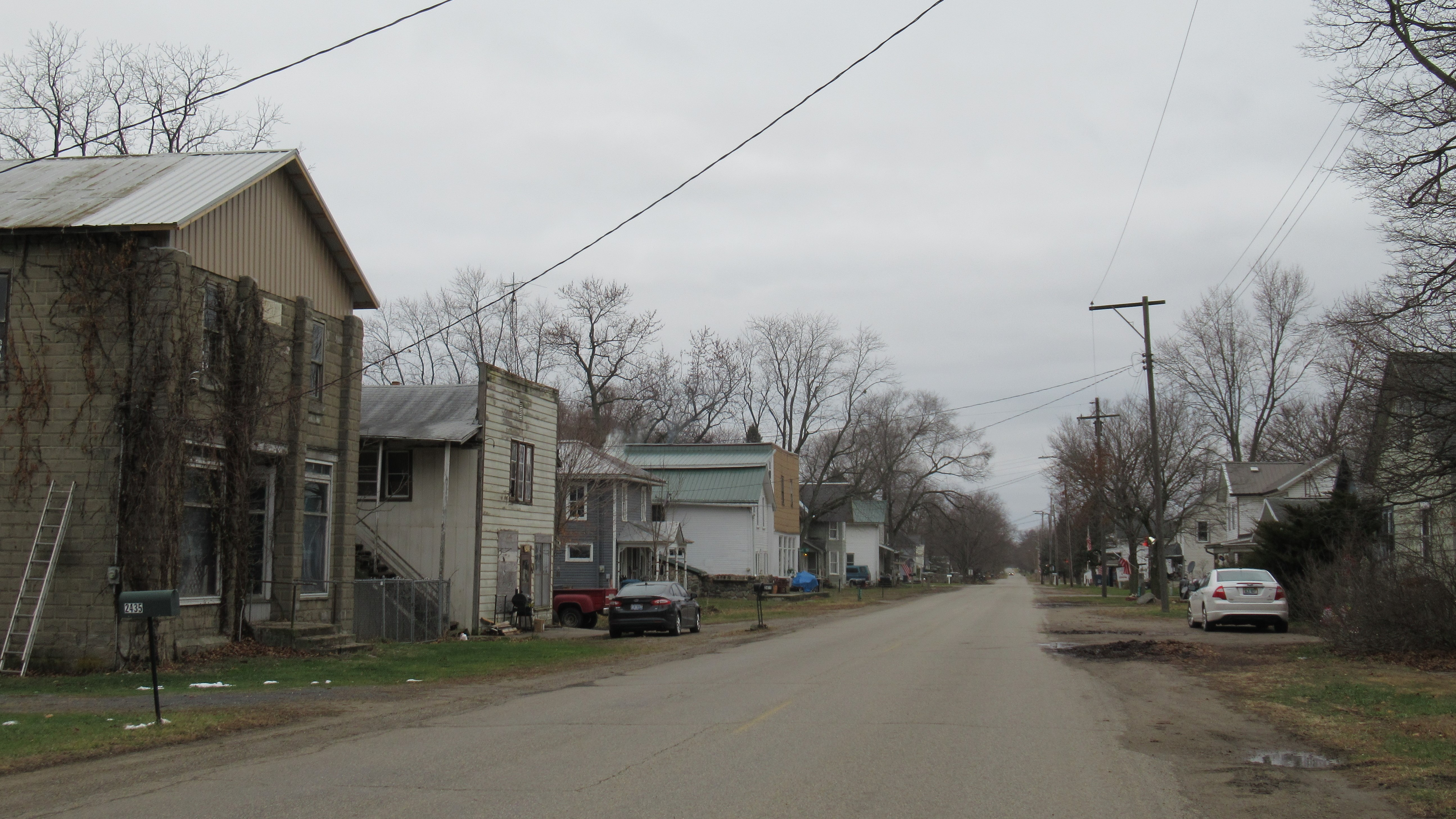
- Looking west along E. Montgomery Road

- Location within the state of Michigan Location within the United States
- Coordinates: 41°46′54″N 84°36′17″W
- Country: United States
- State: Michigan
- County: Hillsdale
- Township: Woodbridge
- Settled: 1834
- Established: 1851
- Elevation: 1,030 ft (310 m)
- Time zone: UTC-5 (Eastern (EST))
  - Summer (DST): UTC-4 (EDT)
- ZIP code(s): 49232 (Camden); 49239; 49242 (Hillsdale)
- Area code: 517
- GNIS feature ID: 626516

Frontier is an unincorporated community in Hillsdale County in the U.S. state of Michigan. The community is located within Woodbridge Township.

As an unincorporated community, Frontier has no legally defined boundaries or population statistics of its own but does have its own post office with the 49239 ZIP Code, which is exclusively used for post office box services.

== Geography ==
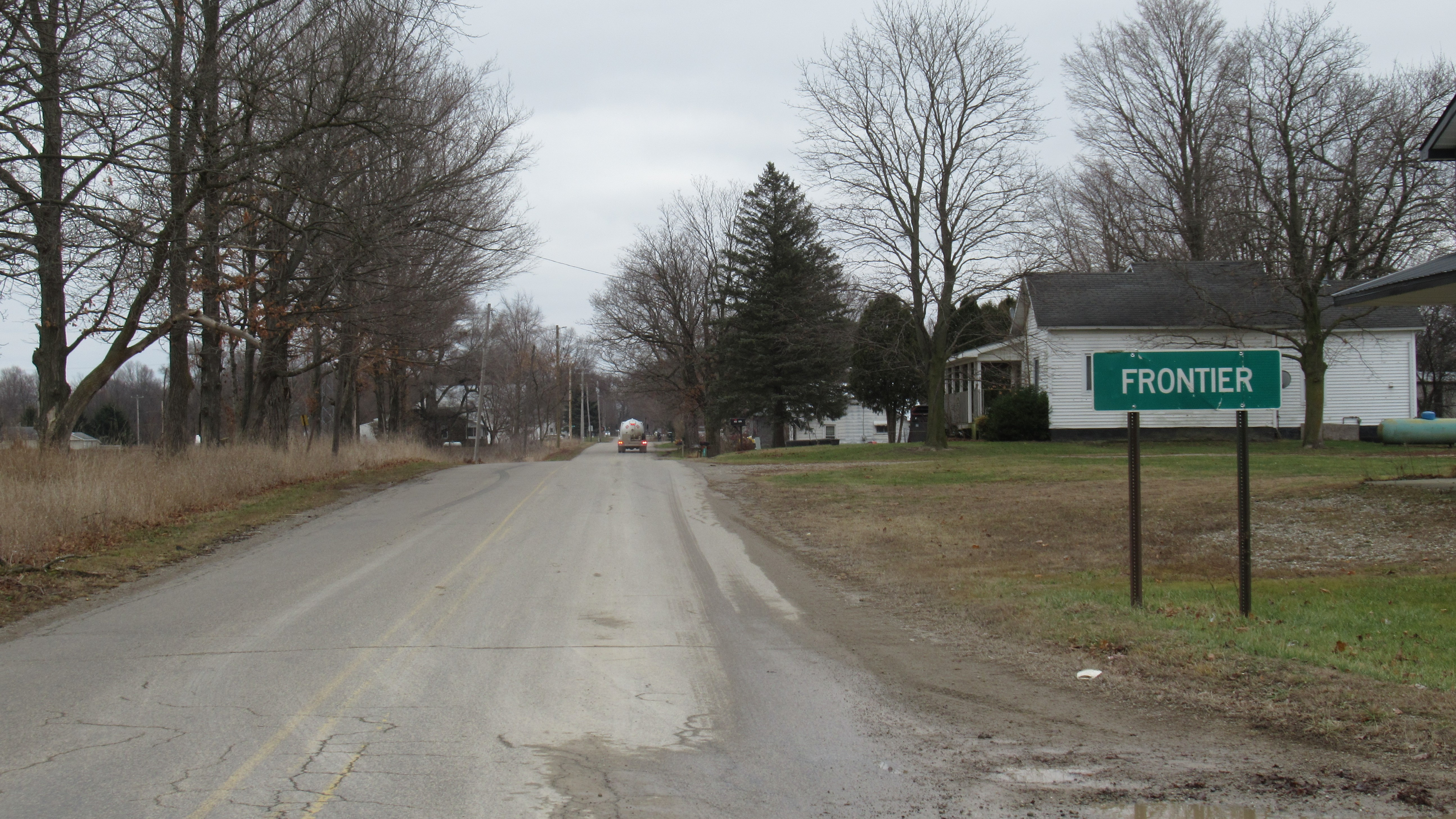
Signage along E. Montgomery Road

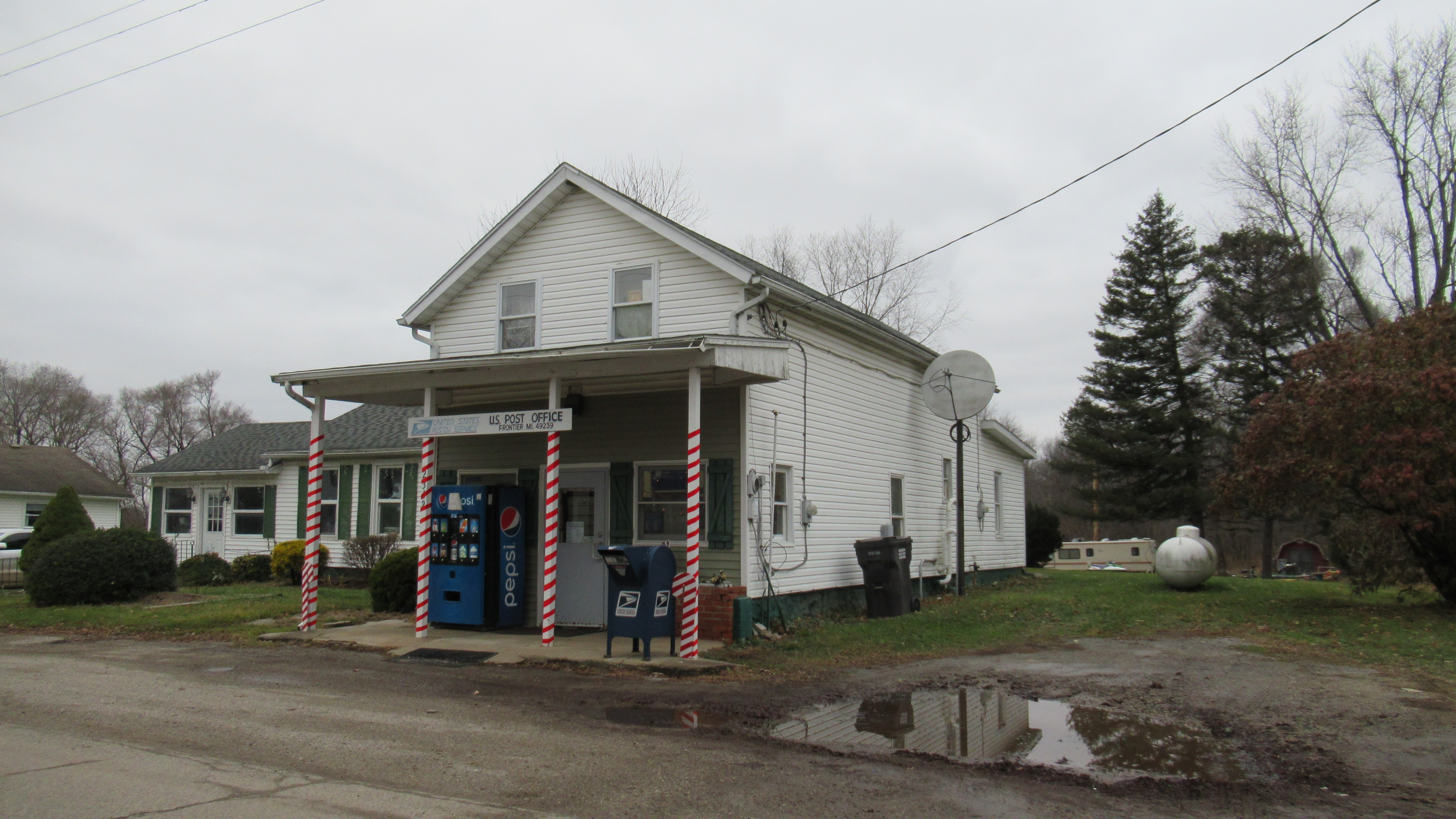
U.S. Post Office in Frontier

Frontier is located in northeastern Woodbridge Township in southern Hillsdale County about 40 miles (64 km) south of the city of Jackson. The community is about 5.0 miles (8.0 km) north of the state border with Ohio near the southernmost point in the state of Michigan.

The nearest city is Hillsdale about 11.0 miles (17.7 km) to the north, while nearby villages include Montgomery to the west, Camden to the southwest, Reading to the northwest, and Waldon to the southeast. The Ohio village of Pioneer is located to the south. Other nearby unincorporated communities include Ransom to the east, Cambria to the northwest, Shadyside and Fountain Park to the northeast, and Austin to the southwest. Frontier is not served by any major highways, rail lines, or airports, although M-99 runs south–north about 2.5 miles (4.0 km) east of the community and is accessible via East Montgomery Road.

The community is served by Camden–Frontier Schools to the south in Amboy Township. The Woodbridge Township government office and fire department are located in the western portion of the community along East Montgomery Road.

The Frontier post office is located at 2342 East Montgomery Road in the center of the community. The post office uses the 49258 ZIP Code, which is primarily used for post office box services. For delivery, the surrounded area is served by the Hillsdale 49242 ZIP Code, while areas to the southwest may use the Camden 49232 ZIP Code.

== History ==
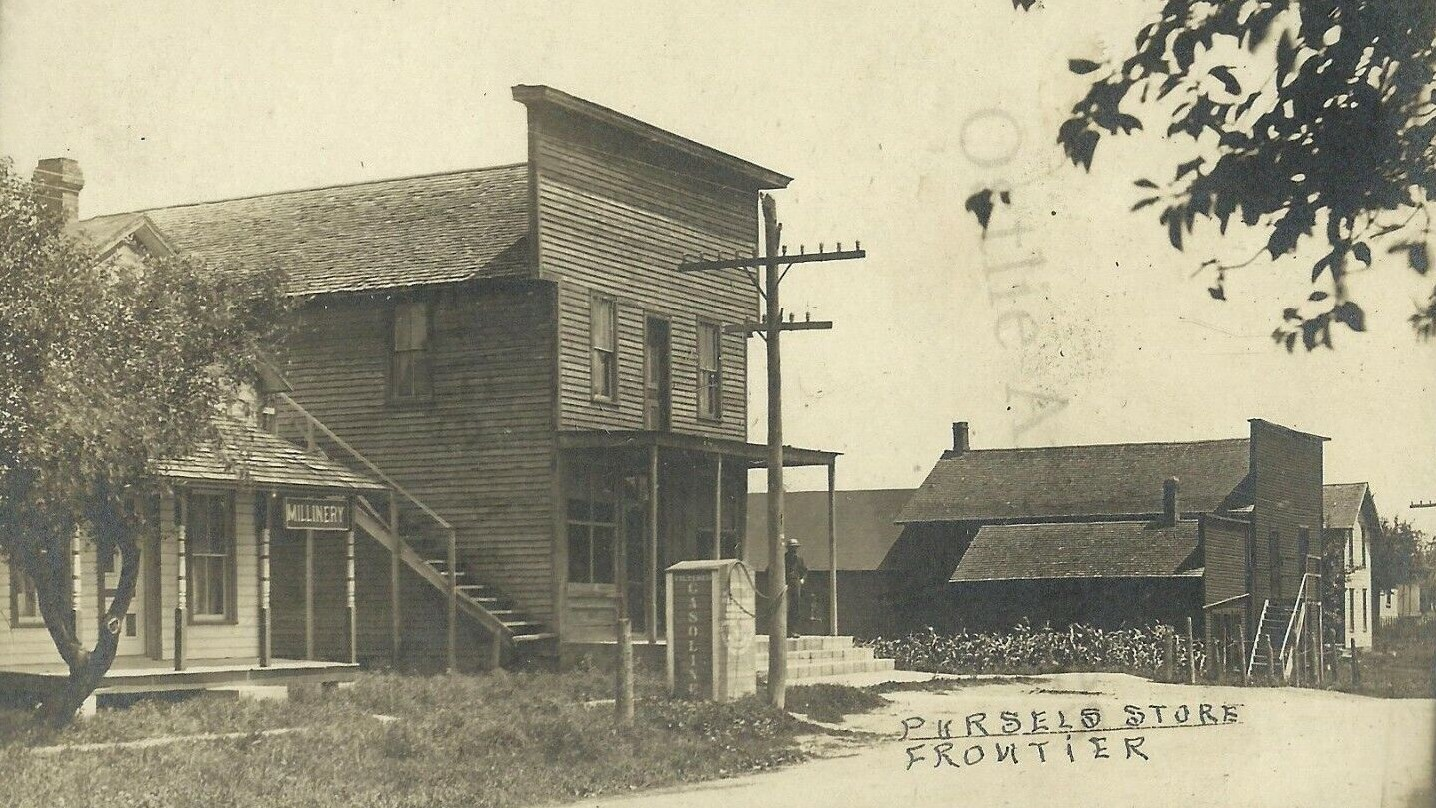
Historic image from around 1910

The area was first settled by the William Saxton family in 1834, which was one year before Hillsdale County was officially organized in the Michigan Territory. Saxton was originally from Canandaigua, New York and moved to Michigan, first residing in Raisin Township in Lenawee County. He purchased 160 acres (65 ha) from the government, built his log cabin, and settled in the undeveloped region with his family. Other settlers and family members moved to the area in the next few years. By 1839, several families now lived in the area, and Woodbridge Township itself was established in 1840.

The community became known as Frontier when it was organized in 1851. It was named Frontier, as it was the last Michigan settlement before reaching the Ohio state line. In 1855, residents of the community built the Woodbridge Township Hall at a total cost of $260. A post office began operating here on January 30, 1857, with Benjamin Duealer serving as the first postmaster. The post office closed soon after on August 6, 1858, but was restored on November 9, 1861. The post office has remained in operation ever since, and the current post office was built in 1869. In an 1857 map of Hillsdale County, the Saxton and Duealer homesteads, among other families, can be seen in section 12 in the northeast portion of Woodbridge Township. Frontier developed as a station along the route between Amboy going north to Hillsdale.

The name Frontier appeared on an 1872 map of Woodbridge Township. By this time, Frontier's first settler, William Saxton, had left the area and moved to Iowa. By 1879, the community had a population of around 150 and contained two general stores, a sawmill, stave factory, and several small mechanic shops. An Independent Order of Odd Fellows lodge was built in Frontier in 1912. Originally served by neighboring fire departments, the township appropriated $10,000 to purchase the lot next to the township hall to build their own fire department in 1957. The fire department now serves areas of several neighboring townships. In 1975, the Woodbridge Township Hall was recognized by the Michigan Townships Association as the oldest operating township hall in the state.
