= Woodbridge Township, Michigan =

- Civil township
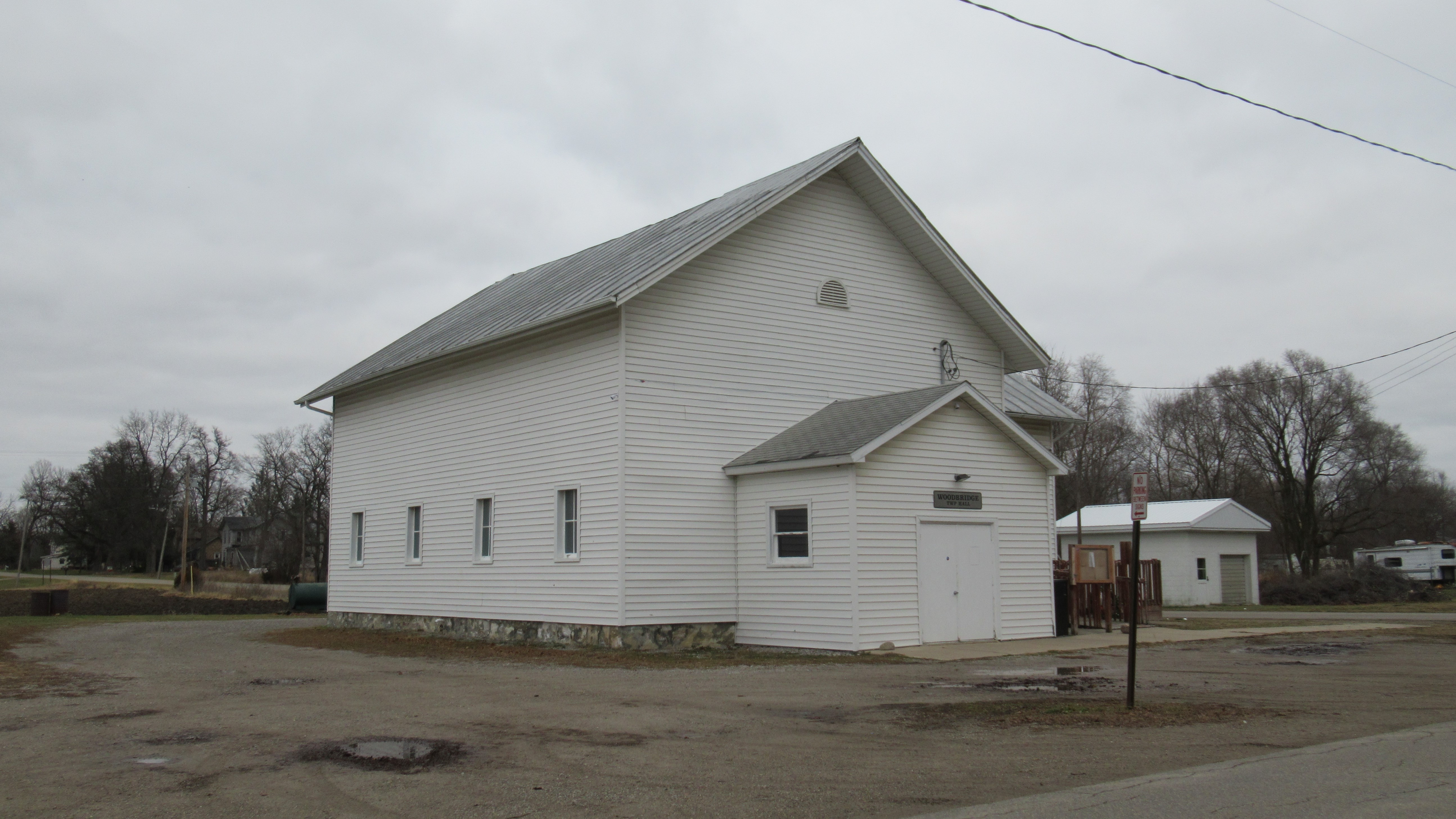
- Woodbridge Township Hall in Frontier

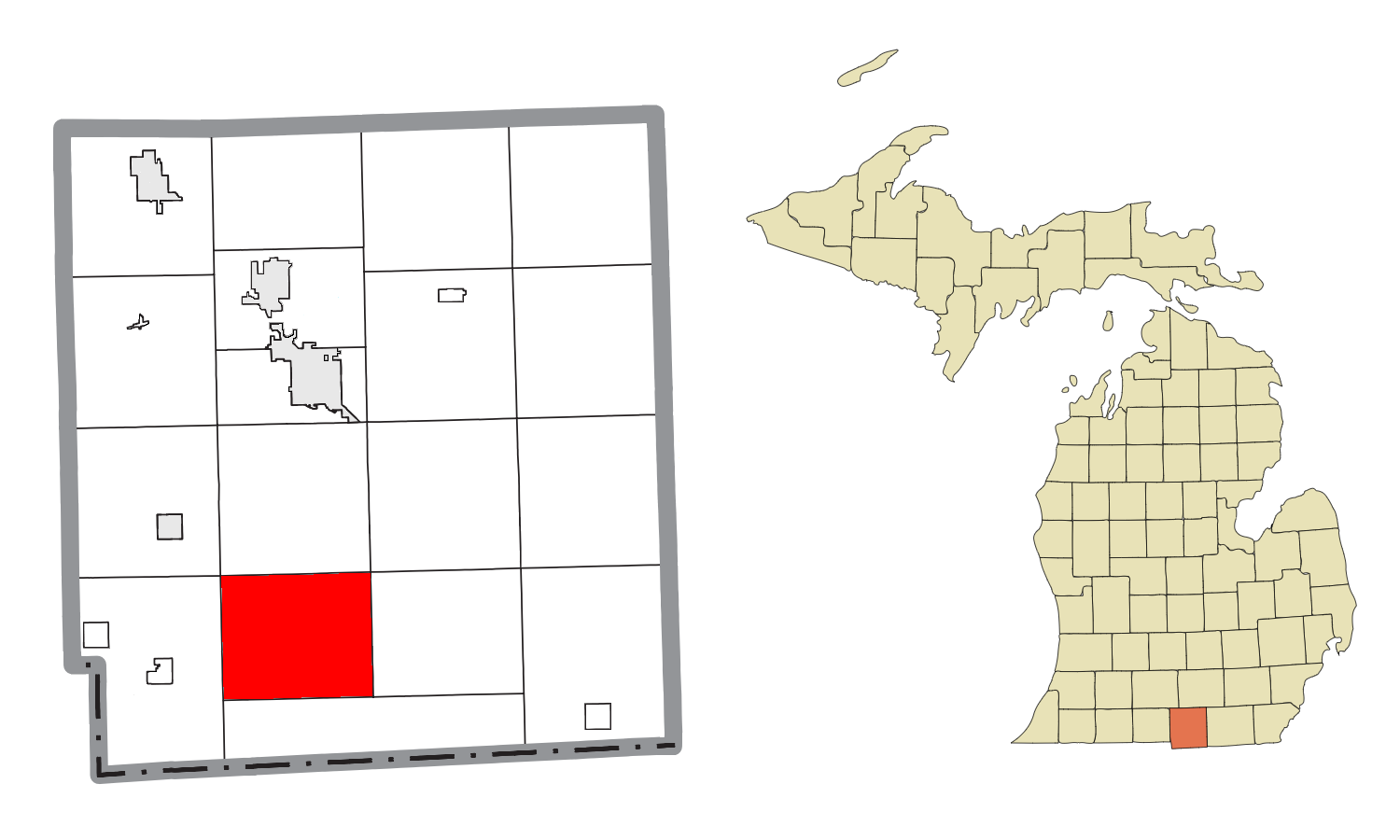
- Location within Hillsdale County

- Location within the state of Michigan Location within the United States
- Coordinates: 41°46′51″N 84°39′04″W
- Country: United States
- State: Michigan
- County: Hillsdale
- Established: 1840

Government
  - Supervisor: Steve Sanders
  - Clerk: Martha Crow

Area
  - Total: 30.08 sq mi (77.91 km^{2})
  - Land: 30.05 sq mi (77.83 km^{2})
  - Water: 0.031 sq mi (0.08 km^{2})
- Elevation: 1,010 ft (308 m)

Population (2020)
  - Total: 1,421
  - Density: 47.3/sq mi (18.3/km^{2})
- Time zone: UTC-5 (Eastern (EST))
  - Summer (DST): UTC-4 (EDT)
- ZIP code(s): 49232 (Camden); 49239 (Frontier); 49242 (Hillsdale); 49274 (Reading)
- Area code: 517
- FIPS code: 26-88300
- GNIS feature ID: 1627286

Woodbridge Township is a civil township of Hillsdale County in the U.S. state of Michigan. The township had a population of 1,421 at the 2020 census.

== Communities ==
- Austin is an unincorporated community in the southern part of the township on the boundary with Amboy Township at 41°44′14″N 84°41′39″W. Also known as Whitetown, it was first settled by the White family.
- Frontier is an unincorporated community within the township at 41°46′54″N 84°36′17″W.

== History ==
Woodbridge Township was organized in 1840 from the southernmost section of the then-larger Fayette Township. Woodbridge Township extended south to the state border with Ohio until Amboy Township was created from the southernmost section of Woodbridge Township in 1850.

The current Woodbridge Township Hall in the community of Frontier was built in 1855 after the township board approved $250 for its construction and $10 for the land for the building. The structure was completed in 1856 and received several additions in later years. In 1975, the Michigan Townships Association verified Woodbridge Township Hall as the oldest operational township hall in the state.

== Geography ==
According to the U.S. Census Bureau, the township has a total area of 30.08 square miles (77.91 km^{2}), of which 30.05 square miles (77.83 km^{2}) is land and 0.03 square miles (0.08 km^{2}) (0.10%) is water.

== Demographics ==
As of the census of 2000, there were 1,337 people, 415 households, and 337 families residing in the township. The population density was 44.5 inhabitants per square mile (17.2/km^{2}). There were 466 housing units at an average density of 15.5 per square mile (6.0/km^{2}). The racial makeup of the township was 96.56% White, 0.37% African American, 0.15% Native American, 0.07% Asian, 0.07% Pacific Islander, 0.67% from other races, and 2.09% from two or more races. Hispanic or Latino of any race were 0.97% of the population.

There were 415 households, out of which 44.6% had children under the age of 18 living with them, 70.6% were married couples living together, 7.5% had a female householder with no husband present, and 18.6% were non-families. 15.4% of all households were made up of individuals, and 7.2% had someone living alone who was 65 years of age or older. The average household size was 3.21 and the average family size was 3.57.

In the township the population was spread out, with 35.6% under the age of 18, 9.2% from 18 to 24, 27.0% from 25 to 44, 18.5% from 45 to 64, and 9.7% who were 65 years of age or older. The median age was 30 years. For every 100 females, there were 98.4 males. For every 100 females age 18 and over, there were 99.8 males.

The median income for a household in the township was $35,294, and the median income for a family was $38,155. Males had a median income of $34,625 versus $25,221 for females. The per capita income for the township was $14,088. About 10.2% of families and 13.3% of the population were below the poverty line, including 16.8% of those under age 18 and 6.6% of those age 65 or over.

== Education ==
The township is served by two separate public school districts. The majority of the township is served by Camden-Frontier Schools in Amboy Township, while the northwest corner of the township is served by Reading Community Schools to the northwest in Reading.
