= Montgomery, Michigan =

- Village
- Village of Montgomery
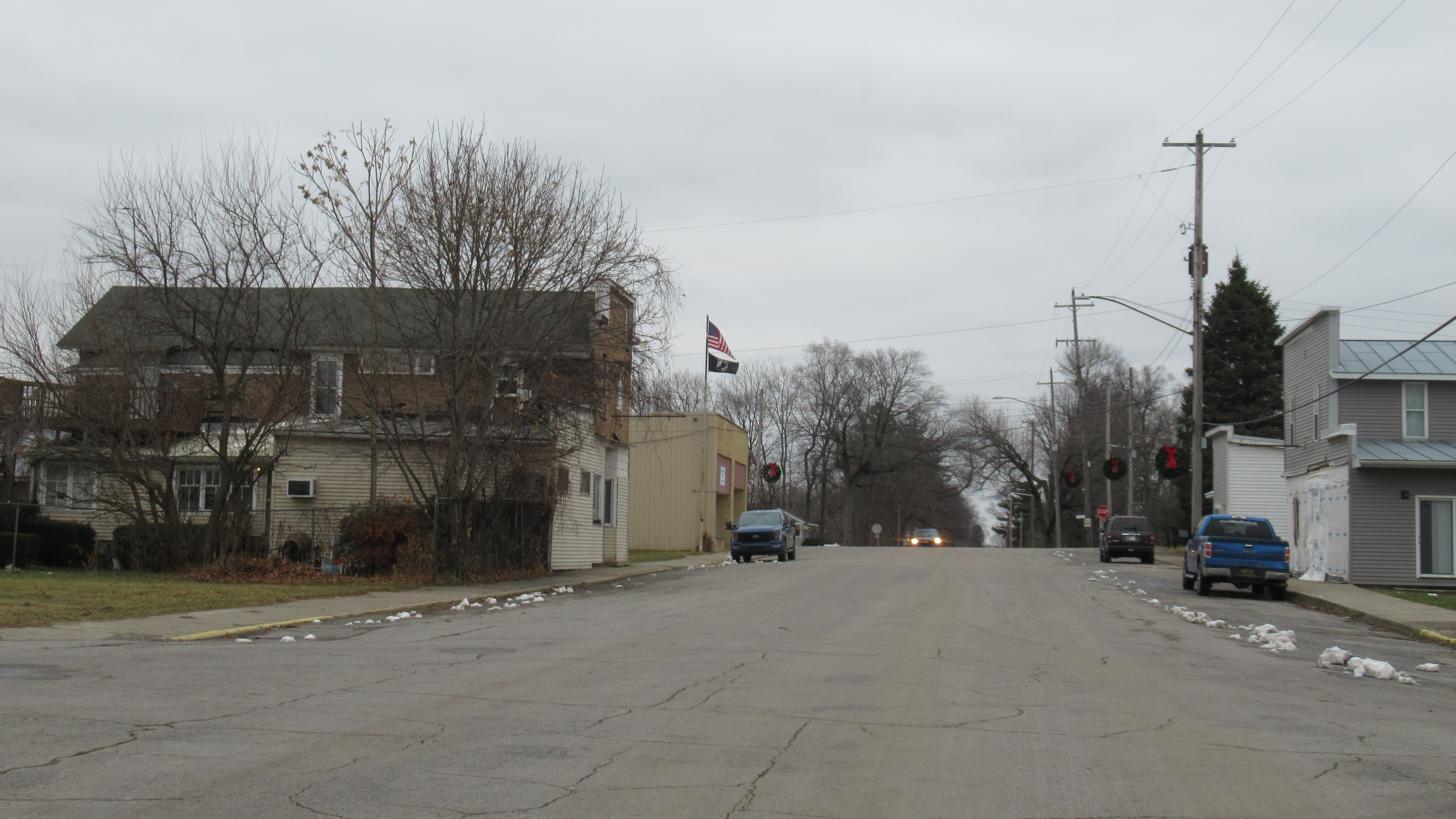
- Looking east along Hakes Street

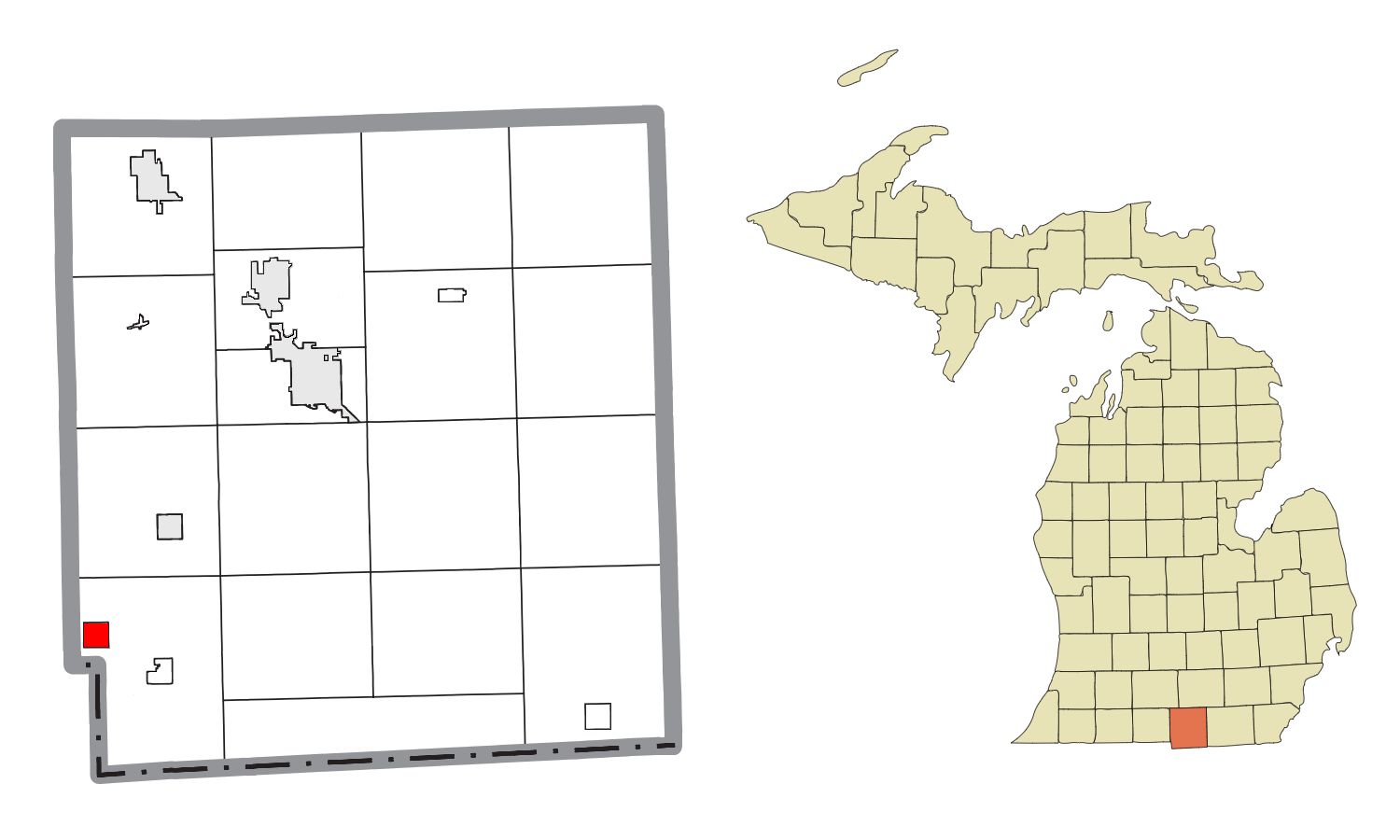
- Location within Hillsdale County

- Location within the state of Michigan Location within the United States
- Coordinates: 41°46′37″N 84°48′21″W
- Country: United States
- State: Michigan
- County: Hillsdale
- Township: Camden
- Settled: 1870
- Platted: 1871
- Incorporated: 1906

Government
  - Type: Village council
  - President: Richard Beem

Area
  - Total: 1.00 sq mi (2.60 km^{2})
  - Land: 1.00 sq mi (2.60 km^{2})
  - Water: 0 sq mi (0.00 km^{2})
- Elevation: 1,050 ft (320 m)

Population (2020)
  - Total: 322
  - Density: 322/sq mi (124/km^{2})
- Time zone: UTC-5 (Eastern (EST))
  - Summer (DST): UTC-4 (EDT)
- ZIP code(s): 49255; 49274 (Reading)
- Area code: 517
- FIPS code: 26-55220
- GNIS feature ID: 0632603

Montgomery is a village in Hillsdale County in the U.S. state of Michigan. The population was 322 at the 2020 census. The village is located within Camden Township.

== History ==
The community was first settled as early as 1870 by several farmers who moved to the area prior to the expansion of the railroad that came by the next year. In 1871, the community was known simply as the Station. When the farmers went to Hillsdale to have their community officially platted, the county clerk, William Montgomery, said he would record it for free in exchange for naming the new community after him. The farmers agreed, and the community received a post office named Montgomery on December 20, 1871. Montgomery incorporated a village in 1906.

== Geography ==
According to the U.S. Census Bureau, the village has a total area of 1.00 square mile (2.59 km^{2}), all land.

== Demographics ==
Historical population
Census	Pop.	Note	%±
1910	362		—
1920	354		−2.2%
1930	277		−21.8%
1940	313		13.0%
1950	397		26.8%
1960	362		−8.8%
1970	404		11.6%
1980	408		1.0%
1990	388		−4.9%
2000	386		−0.5%
2010	342		−11.4%
2020	322		−5.8%
U.S. Decennial Census

=== 2010 census ===
As of the census of 2010, there were 342 people, 126 households, and 79 families living in the village. The population density was 342.0 inhabitants per square mile (132.0/km^{2}). There were 146 housing units at an average density of 146.0 per square mile (56.4/km^{2}). The racial makeup of the village was 98.0% White, 0.3% Native American, 0.6% Asian, and 1.2% from two or more races. Hispanic or Latino of any race were 2.0% of the population.

There were 126 households, of which 37.3% had children under the age of 18 living with them, 45.2% were married couples living together, 11.1% had a female householder with no husband present, 6.3% had a male householder with no wife present, and 37.3% were non-families. 32.5% of all households were made up of individuals, and 15.9% had someone living alone who was 65 years of age or older. The average household size was 2.61 and the average family size was 3.32.

The median age in the village was 35.7 years. 30.1% of residents were under the age of 18; 7% were between the ages of 18 and 24; 28.9% were from 25 to 44; 16.6% were from 45 to 64; and 17.3% were 65 years of age or older. The gender makeup of the village was 52.6% male and 47.4% female.

=== 2000 census ===
As of the census of 2000, there were 386 people, 137 households, and 99 families living in the village. The population density was 392.3 inhabitants per square mile (151.5/km^{2}). There were 148 housing units at an average density of 150.4 per square mile (58.1/km^{2}). The racial makeup of the village was 99.22% White, 0.26% Native American and 0.52% Asian. Hispanic or Latino of any race were 2.07% of the population.

There were 137 households, out of which 40.1% had children under the age of 18 living with them, 53.3% were married couples living together, 10.2% had a female householder with no husband present, and 27.7% were non-families. 24.8% of all households were made up of individuals, and 12.4% had someone living alone who was 65 years of age or older. The average household size was 2.72 and the average family size was 3.09.

In the village, the population was spread out, with 30.8% under the age of 18, 7.8% from 18 to 24, 31.6% from 25 to 44, 16.8% from 45 to 64, and 13.0% who were 65 years of age or older. The median age was 32 years. For every 100 females, there were 107.5 males. For every 100 females age 18 and over, there were 111.9 males.

The median income for a household in the village was $42,500, and the median income for a family was $42,500. Males had a median income of $31,964 versus $24,500 for females. The per capita income for the village was $14,975. About 7.5% of families and 13.9% of the population were below the poverty line, including 9.8% of those under age 18 and 3.4% of those age 65 or over.

== Education ==
The village is served by two separate public school districts. The majority of the village is served by Reading Community Schools to the northeast in Reading. A small portion of the village and the surrounding area is served by Camden-Frontier Schools to the southeast in Amboy Township.

== Images ==
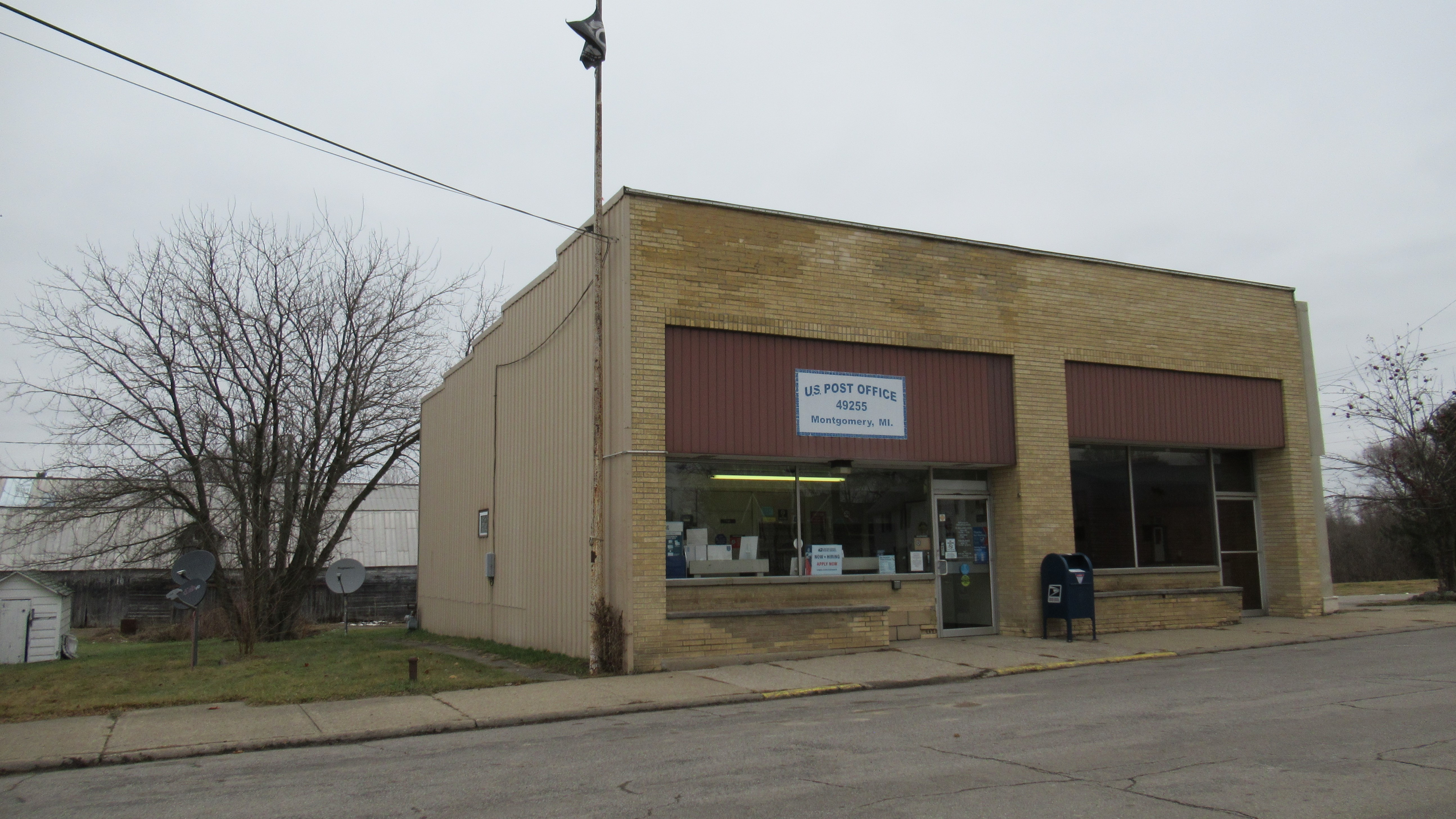
U.S. Post Office in Montgomery

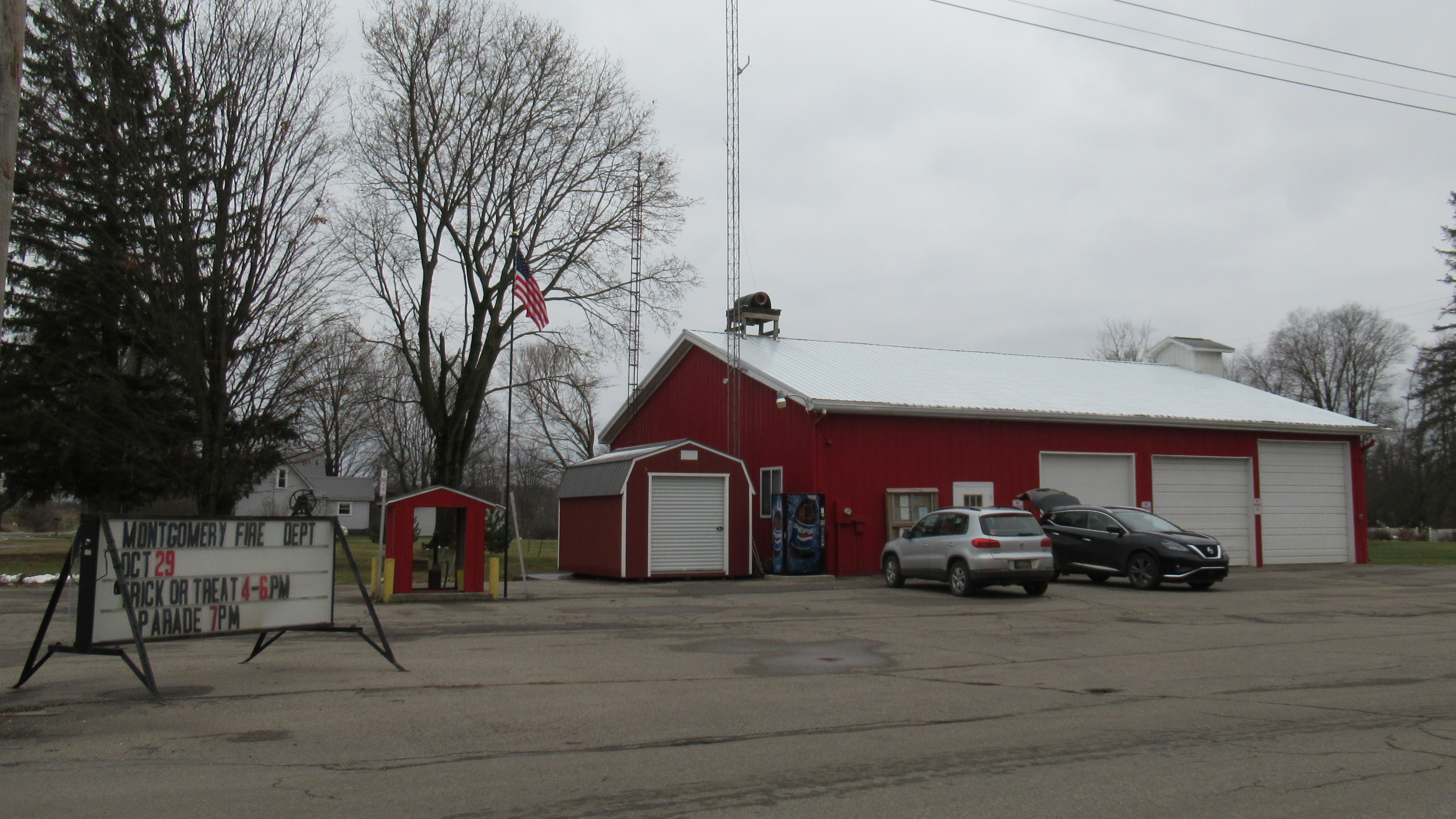
Village office and fire department

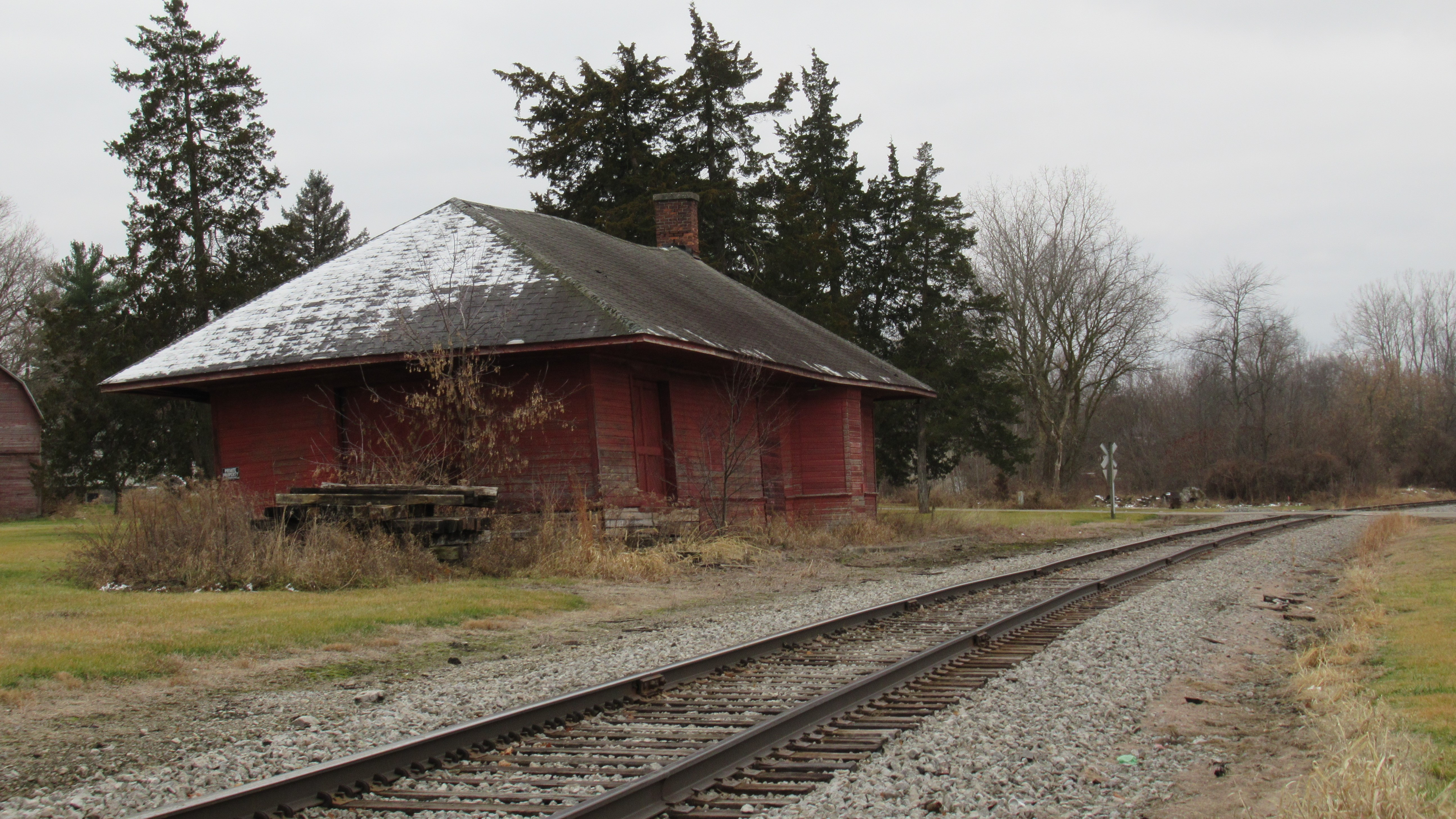
Defunct railroad station in Montgomery
