= Camden Township, Michigan =

- Civil township
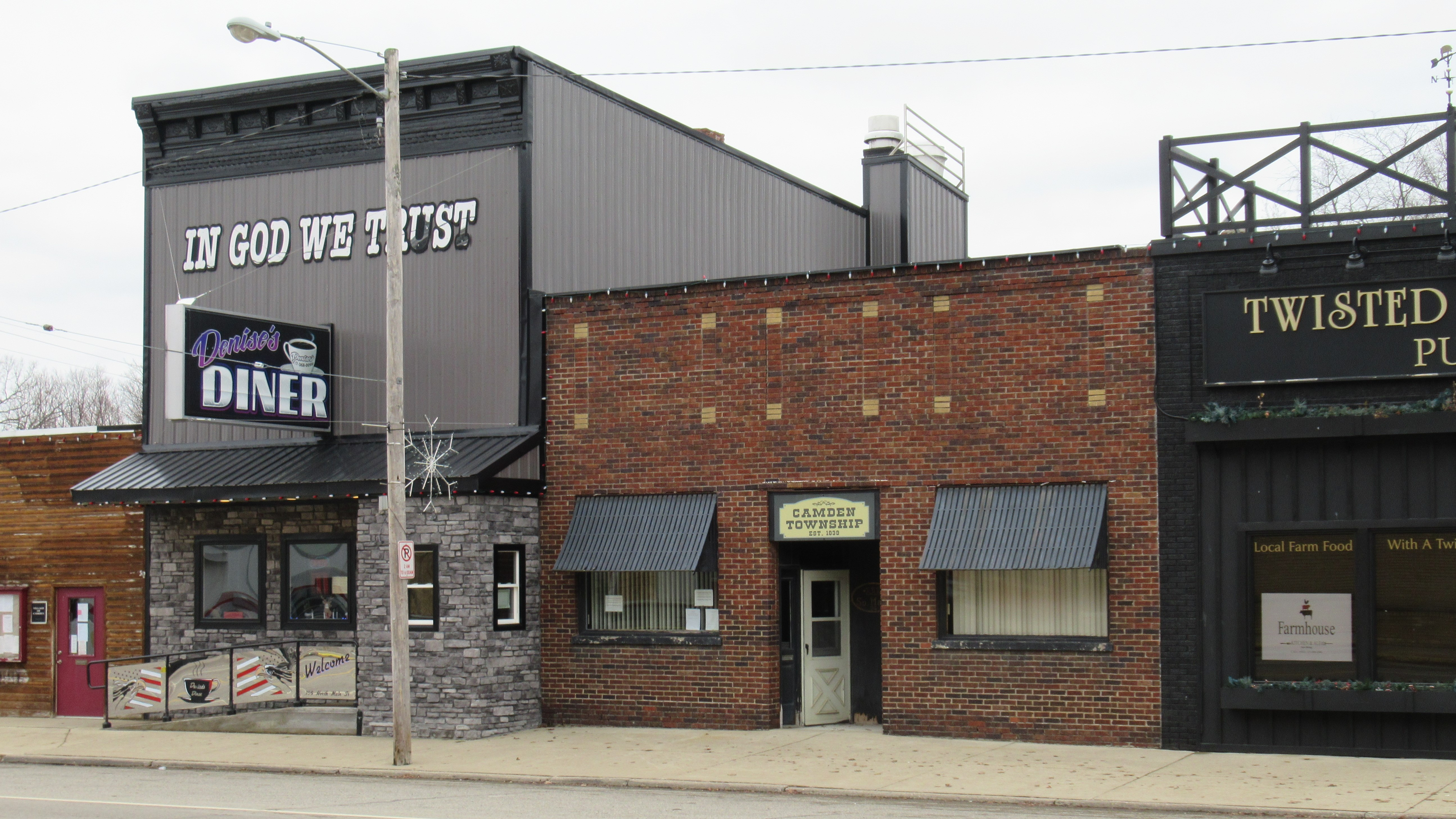
- Camden Township Office in Camden

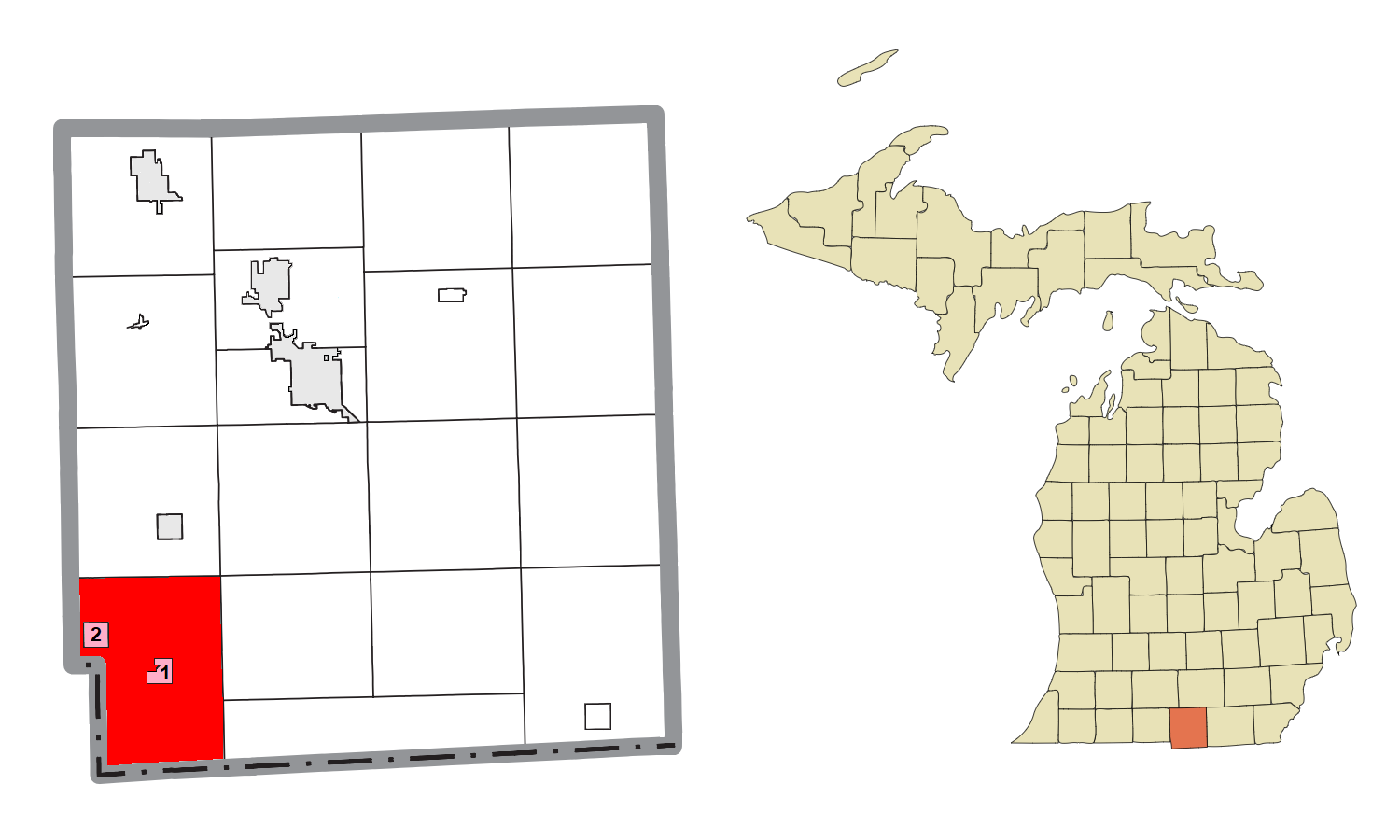
- Location within Hillsdale County and the administered villages of Camden (1) and Montgomery (2)

- Location within the state of Michigan Location within the United States
- Coordinates: 41°46′13″N 84°46′38″W
- Country: United States
- State: Michigan
- County: Hillsdale
- Established: 1839

Government
  - Supervisor: Duane Carlson
  - Clerk: Kristina Dewey

Area
  - Total: 42.60 sq mi (110.33 km^{2})
  - Land: 42.34 sq mi (109.66 km^{2})
  - Water: 0.24 sq mi (0.62 km^{2})
- Elevation: 1,037 ft (316 m)

Population (2020)
  - Total: 2,093
  - Density: 48.3/sq mi (18.6/km^{2})
- Time zone: UTC-5 (Eastern (EST))
  - Summer (DST): UTC-4 (EDT)
- ZIP code(s): 49232 (Camden); 49255 (Montgomery); 49274 (Reading)
- Area code: 517
- FIPS code: 26-12780
- GNIS feature ID: 1626027
- Website: Official website

Camden Township is a civil township of Hillsdale County in the U.S. state of Michigan. The population was 2,093 at the 2020 census. The villages of Camden and Montgomery are within the township.

Due to the angle in Michigan's southern border, Camden Township has the southernmost point in the state, as well as being the only municipality in Michigan to border both the states of Indiana and Ohio.

== Communities ==
- Camden is a village located in the center of the township along M-49 at 41°45′18″N 84°45′25″W.
- Montgomery is a village located in the western portion of the township near the Indiana–Michigan state border at 41°46′37″N 84°48′21″W.

== Geography ==
According to the U.S. Census Bureau, the township has a total area of 42.60 square miles (110.33 km^{2}), of which 42.34 square miles (109.66 km^{2}) is land and 0.24 square miles (0.62 km^{2}) (0.56%) is water.

The township borders both Indiana and Ohio, with the spot where the three states meet indicated by a marker. Due to the angle of the border between Michigan and Ohio, it is also the southernmost point in Michigan. The smaller western branch of the St. Joseph River flows through the township.

=== Major highways ===
- M-49 begins at the Ohio border and runs north through the center of the township.

== Demographics ==
As of the census of 2000, there were 2,088 people, 730 households, and 535 families residing in the township. The population density was 49.2 inhabitants per square mile (19.0/km^{2}). There were 872 housing units at an average density of 20.6 per square mile (8.0/km^{2}). The racial makeup of the township was 98.42% White, 0.05% African American, 0.24% Native American, 0.24% Asian, and 1.05% from two or more races. Hispanic or Latino of any race were 0.57% of the population.

There were 730 households, out of which 36.6% had children under the age of 18 living with them, 59.5% were married couples living together, 8.8% had a female householder with no husband present, and 26.7% were non-families. 22.2% of all households were made up of individuals, and 10.3% had someone living alone who was 65 years of age or older. The average household size was 2.84 and the average family size was 3.31.

In the township the population was spread out, with 31.2% under the age of 18, 9.0% from 18 to 24, 27.1% from 25 to 44, 20.3% from 45 to 64, and 12.5% who were 65 years of age or older. The median age was 32 years. For every 100 females, there were 102.1 males. For every 100 females age 18 and over, there were 98.3 males.

The median income for a household in the township was $37,386, and the median income for a family was $41,006. Males had a median income of $31,292 versus $21,836 for females. The per capita income for the township was $17,882. About 9.6% of families and 15.0% of the population were below the poverty line, including 15.5% of those under age 18 and 9.7% of those age 65 or over.

== Education ==
The township is served by two separate public school districts. Camden-Frontier Schools serves most of the township, while smaller northern portions of the township are served by Reading Community Schools.

== Images ==
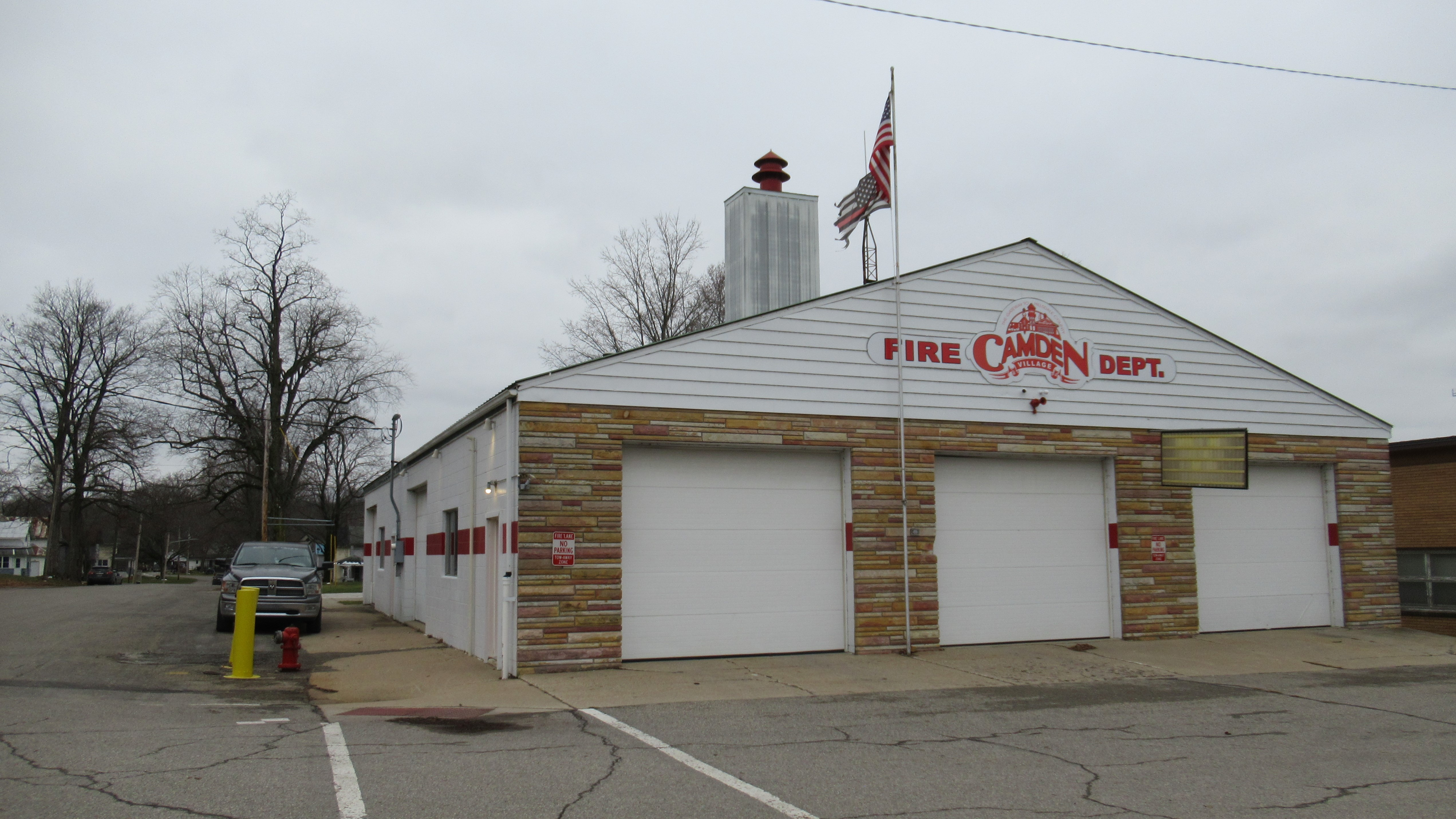
Camden Township Fire Department

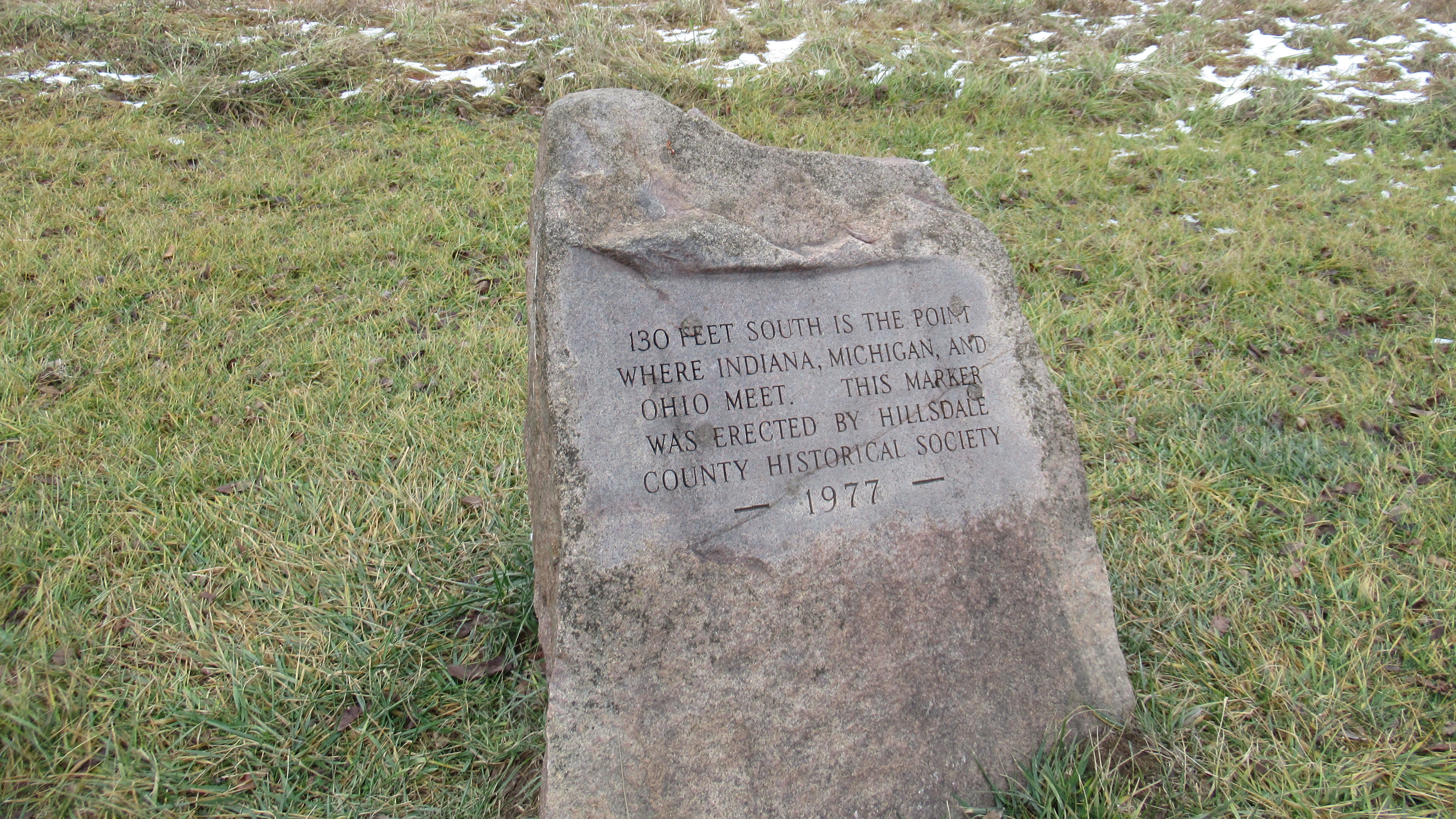
Indiana–Michigan–Ohio tri-state marker

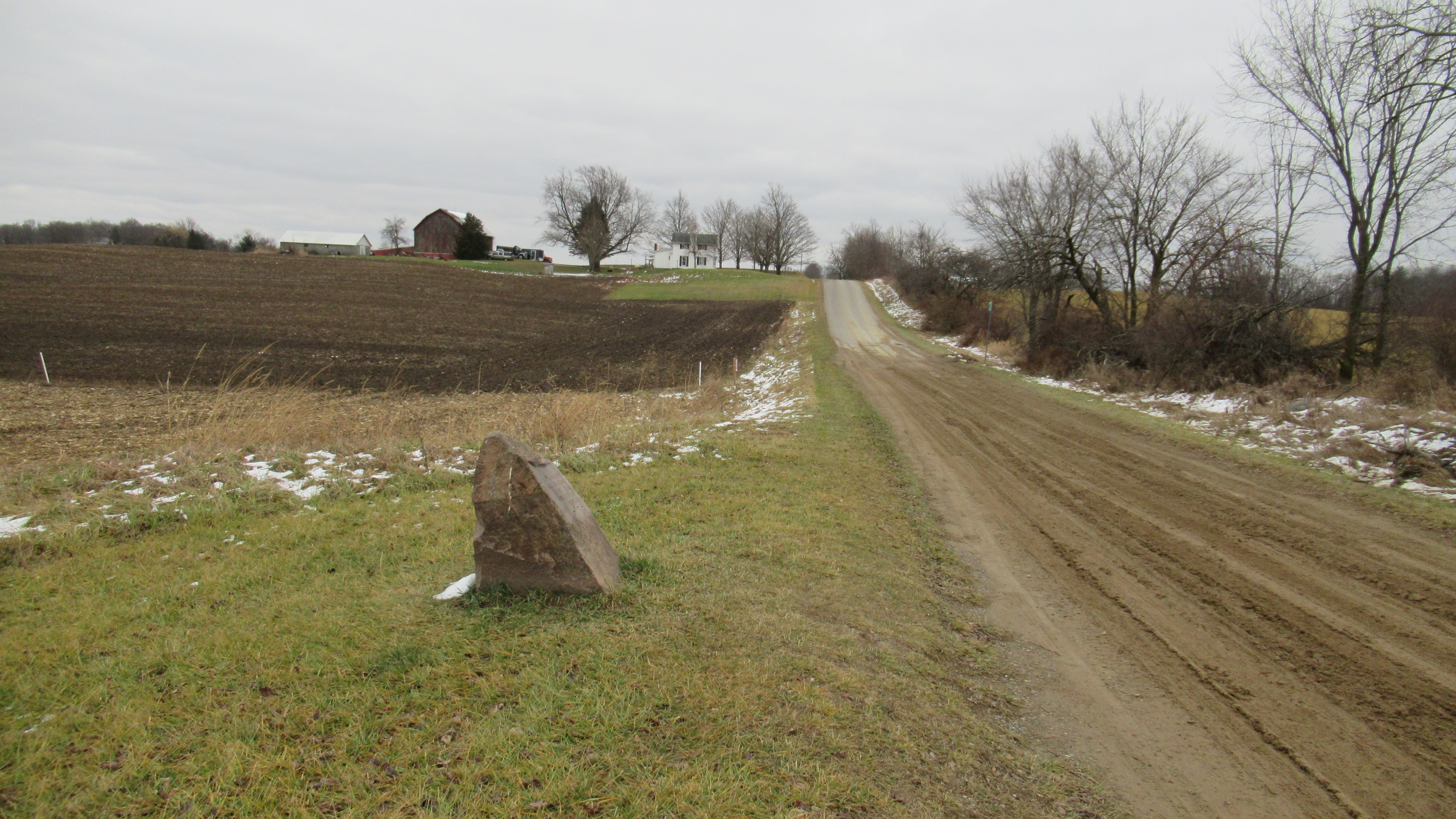
Indiana–Michigan–Ohio tri-state marker
