= Camden, Michigan =

- Village
- Village of Camden
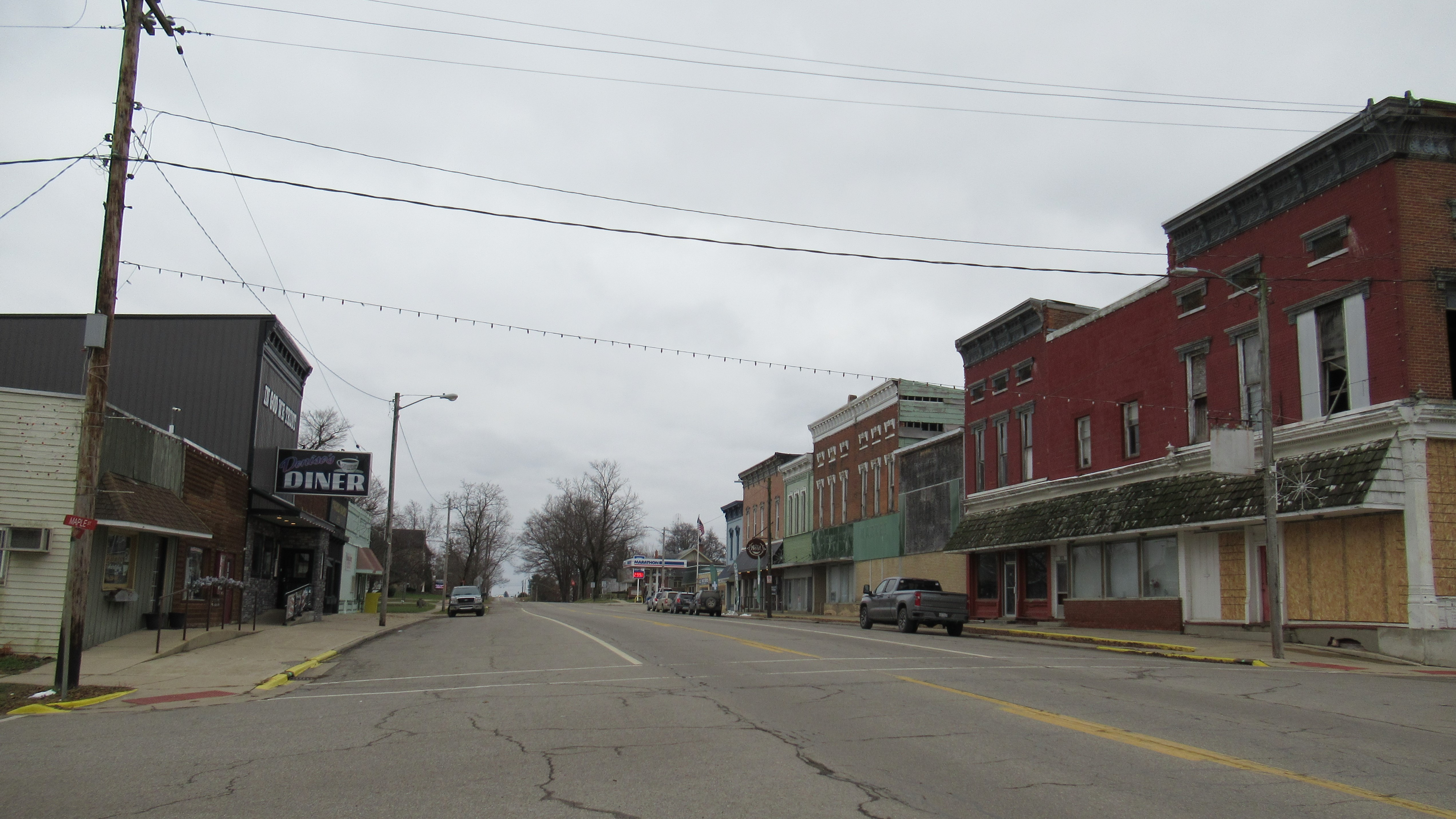
- Looking south along Main Street (M-49)

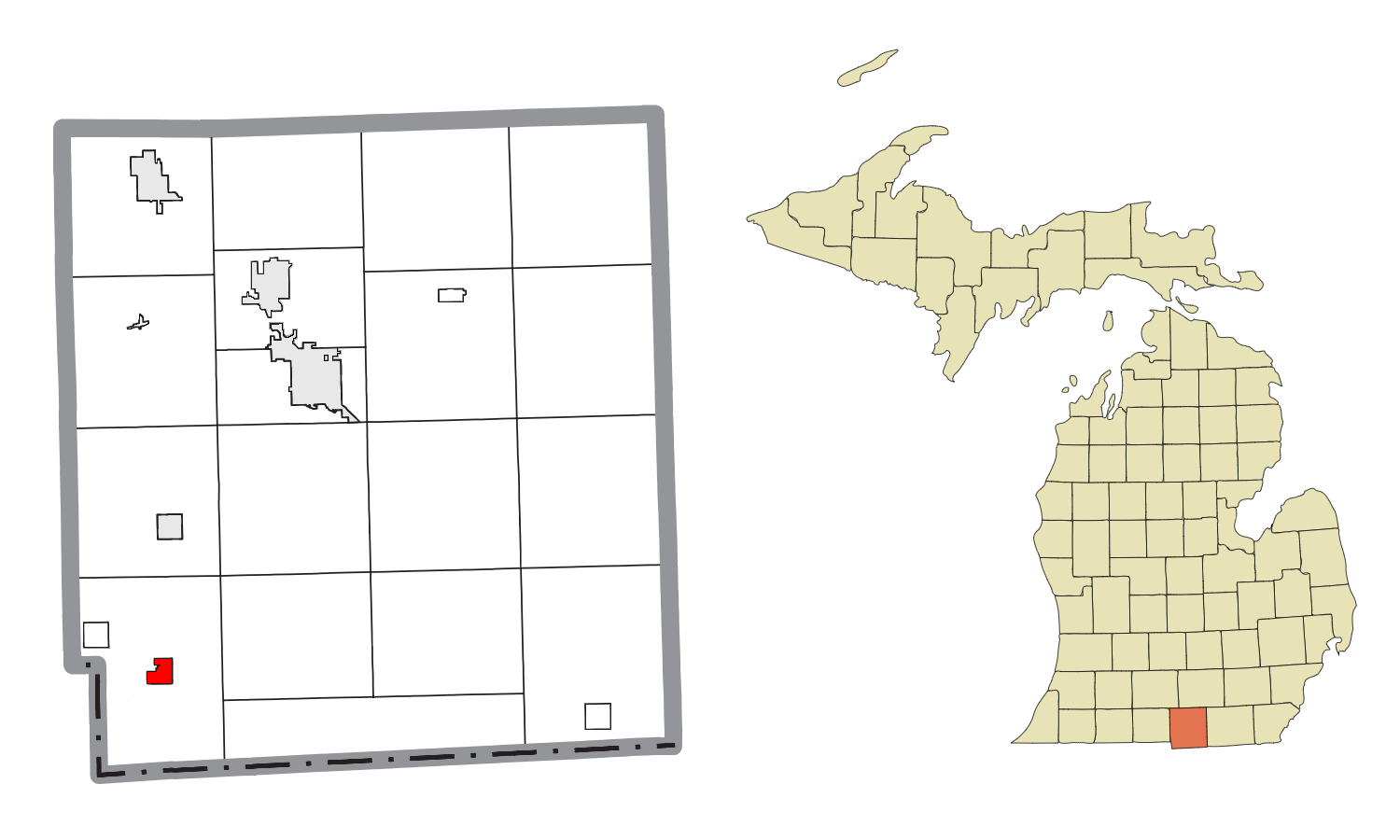
- Location within Hillsdale County

- Location within the state of Michigan Location within the United States
- Coordinates: 41°45′18″N 84°45′25″W
- Country: United States
- State: Michigan
- County: Hillsdale
- Township: Camden
- Founded: 1837
- Platted: 1867
- Incorporated: 1899

Government
  - President: Timothy Daglow
  - Clerk: Angela Daughtry

Area
  - Total: 0.80 sq mi (2.07 km^{2})
  - Land: 0.80 sq mi (2.07 km^{2})
  - Water: 0 sq mi (0.00 km^{2})
- Elevation: 1,020 ft (311 m)

Population (2020)
  - Total: 496
  - Density: 619.3/sq mi (239.12/km^{2})
- Time zone: UTC-5 (Eastern (EST))
  - Summer (DST): UTC-4 (EDT)
- ZIP code(s): 49232
- Area code: 517
- FIPS code: 26-12760
- GNIS feature ID: 0622509
- Website: https://village-of-camden.com/

Camden is a village in Hillsdale County in the U.S. state of Michigan. The population was 496 at the 2020 census. The village is located within Camden Township.

== History ==
Camden was founded as early as 1837 by landowner Easton Chester and his sons Orson and Nathan. The community developed around several sawmills, and a post office named Cranbrook opened on August 10, 1837. The office name was changed to Camden on September 7, 1840. The name was chosen at random by drawing from a hat, which was a name proposed by sawmill owner Easton Chester after his hometown of Camden, New York. The community was officially platted in 1867 and incorporated as a village in 1899.

== Geography ==
According to the U.S. Census Bureau, the village has a total area of 0.80 square miles (2.07 km^{2}), all land.

=== Major highways ===
- M-49 (Main Street) runs south–north through the center of the village.

== Demographics ==
Historical population
| Census | Pop. | Note | %± |
|---|---|---|---|
| 1880 | 191 | | — |
| 1900 | 376 | | — |
| 1910 | 392 | | 4.3% |
| 1920 | 398 | | 1.5% |
| 1930 | 316 | | −20.6% |
| 1940 | 385 | | 21.8% |
| 1950 | 380 | | −1.3% |
| 1960 | 434 | | 14.2% |
| 1970 | 405 | | −6.7% |
| 1980 | 420 | | 3.7% |
| 1990 | 482 | | 14.8% |
| 2000 | 550 | | 14.1% |
| 2010 | 512 | | −6.9% |
| 2020 | 496 | | −3.1% |
U.S. Decennial Census

=== 2010 census ===
As of the census of 2010, there were 512 people, 176 households, and 123 families living in the village. The population density was 609.5 inhabitants per square mile (235.3/km^{2}). There were 211 housing units at an average density of 251.2 per square mile (97.0/km^{2}). The racial makeup of the village was 99.4% White, 0.2% Native American, and 0.4% from two or more races. Hispanic or Latino of any race were 0.2% of the population.

There were 176 households, of which 42.6% had children under the age of 18 living with them, 48.3% were married couples living together, 16.5% had a female householder with no husband present, 5.1% had a male householder with no wife present, and 30.1% were non-families. 24.4% of all households were made up of individuals, and 10.8% had someone living alone who was 65 years of age or older. The average household size was 2.89 and the average family size was 3.41.

The median age in the village was 32.6 years. 31.2% of residents were under the age of 18; 7.3% were between the ages of 18 and 24; 28.9% were from 25 to 44; 23.3% were from 45 to 64; and 9.4% were 65 years of age or older. The gender makeup of the village was 49.4% male and 50.6% female.

=== 2000 census ===
As of the census of 2000, there were 550 people, 198 households, and 134 families living in the village. The population density was 651.5 inhabitants per square mile (251.5/km^{2}). There were 214 housing units at an average density of 253.5 per square mile (97.9/km^{2}). The racial makeup of the village was 97.27% White, 0.55% Native American, 0.55% Asian, and 1.64% from two or more races. Hispanic or Latino of any race were 0.36% of the population.

There were 198 households, out of which 39.9% had children under the age of 18 living with them, 46.0% were married couples living together, 14.1% had a female householder with no husband present, and 32.3% were non-families. 25.8% of all households were made up of individuals, and 13.1% had someone living alone who was 65 years of age or older. The average household size was 2.78 and the average family size was 3.36.

In the village, the population was spread out, with 34.0% under the age of 18, 11.1% from 18 to 24, 28.4% from 25 to 44, 16.5% from 45 to 64, and 10.0% who were 65 years of age or older. The median age was 29 years. For every 100 females, there were 103.0 males. For every 100 females age 18 and over, there were 85.2 males.

The median income for a household in the village was $34,028, and the median income for a family was $36,429. Males had a median income of $29,643 versus $21,042 for females. The per capita income for the village was $13,846. About 9.2% of families and 12.1% of the population were below the poverty line, including 10.9% of those under age 18 and 11.3% of those age 65 or over.

== Education ==
The village is served entirely by Camden-Frontier Schools, which has its campus just to the southeast in Amboy Township.

== Images ==
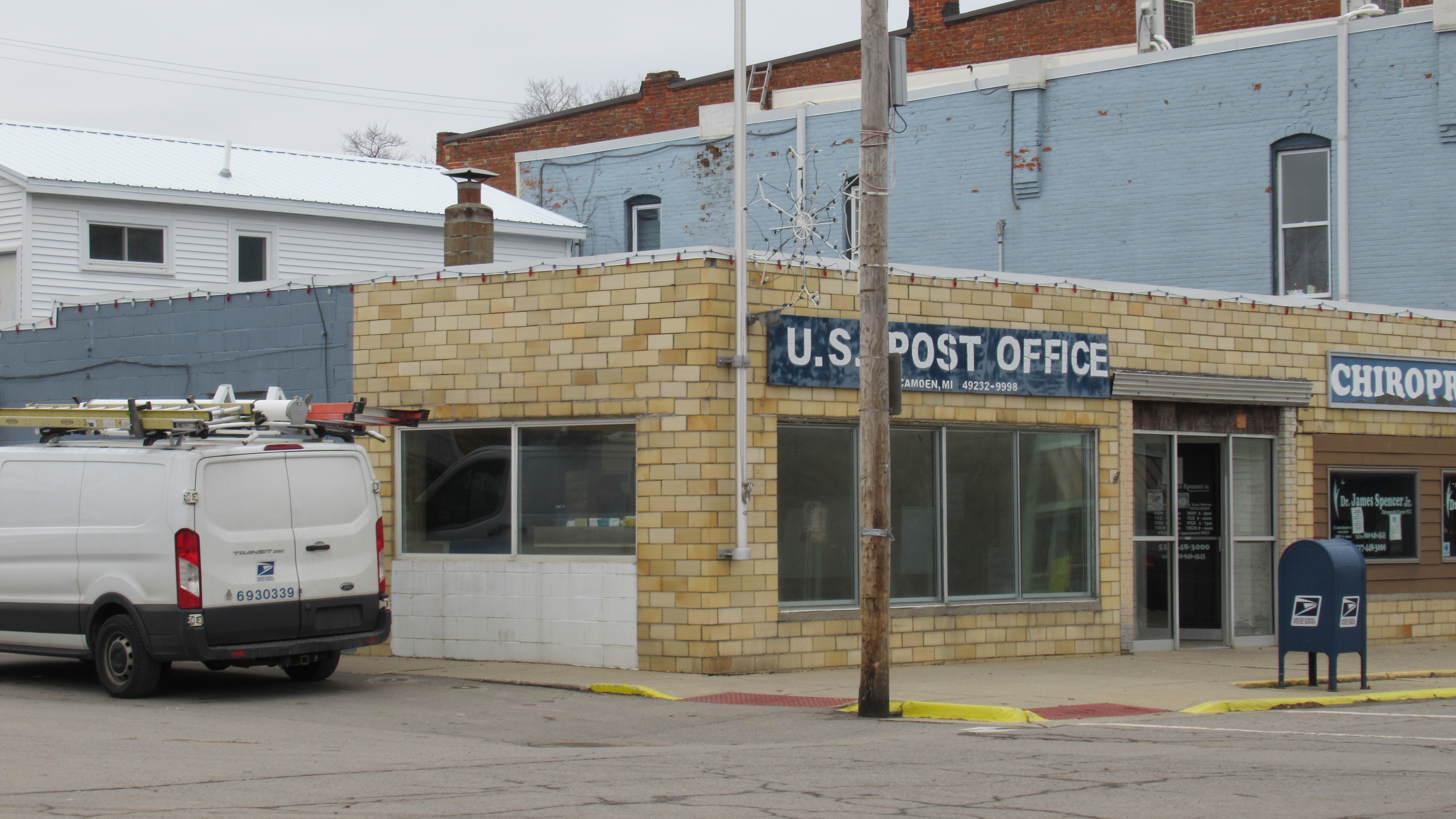
U.S. Post Office in Camden

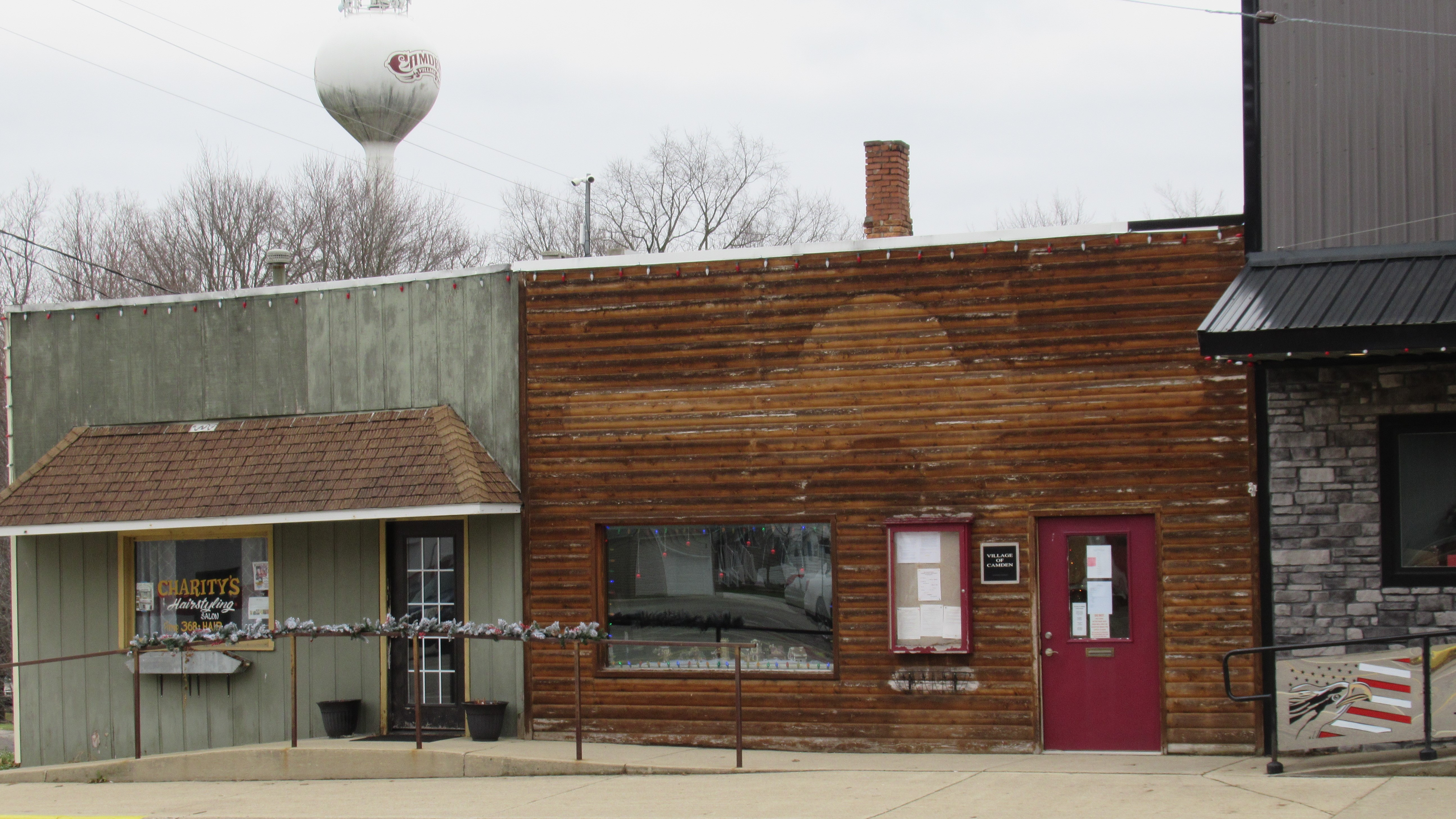
Camden Village Hall

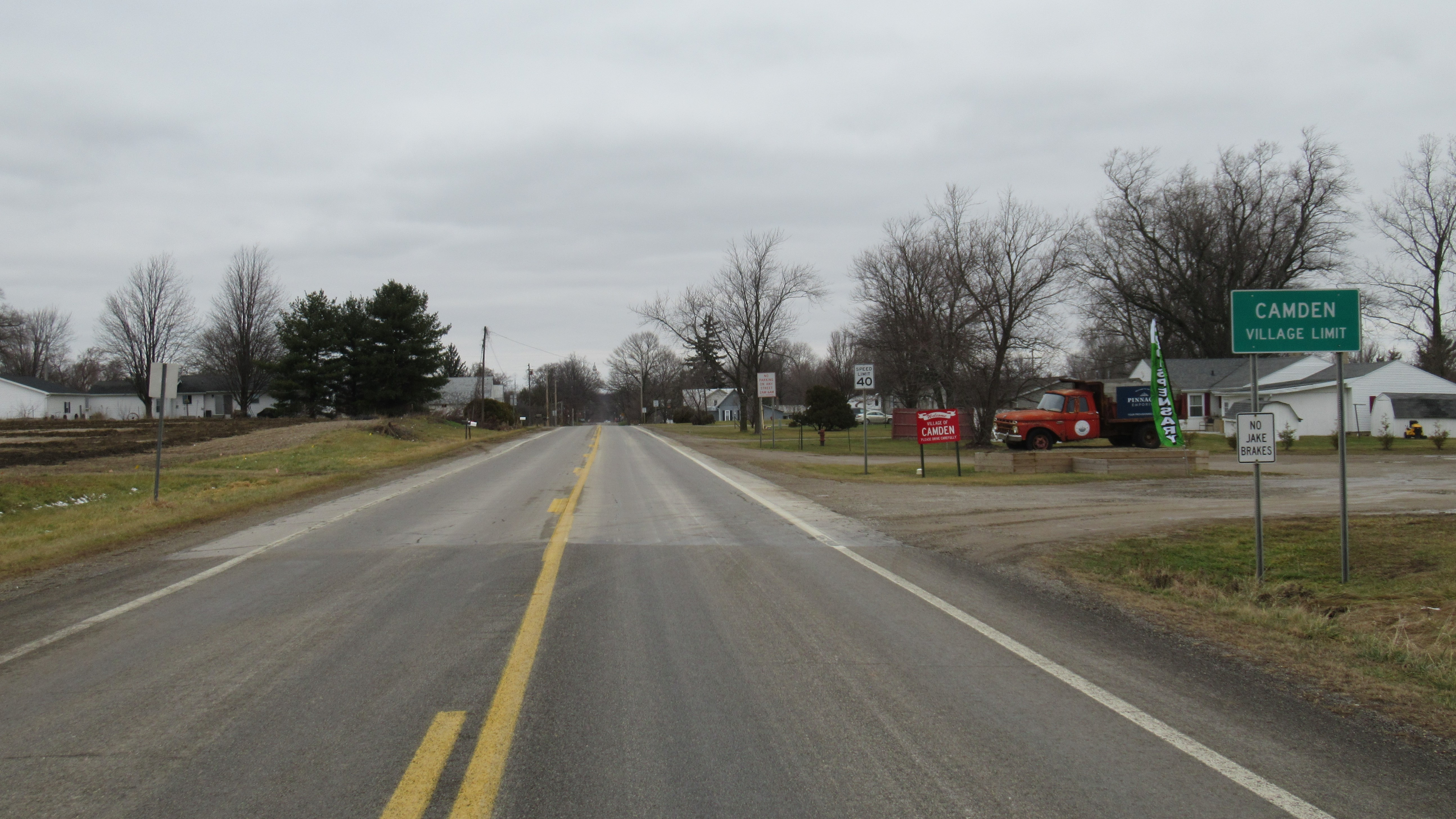
Signage northbound along M-49

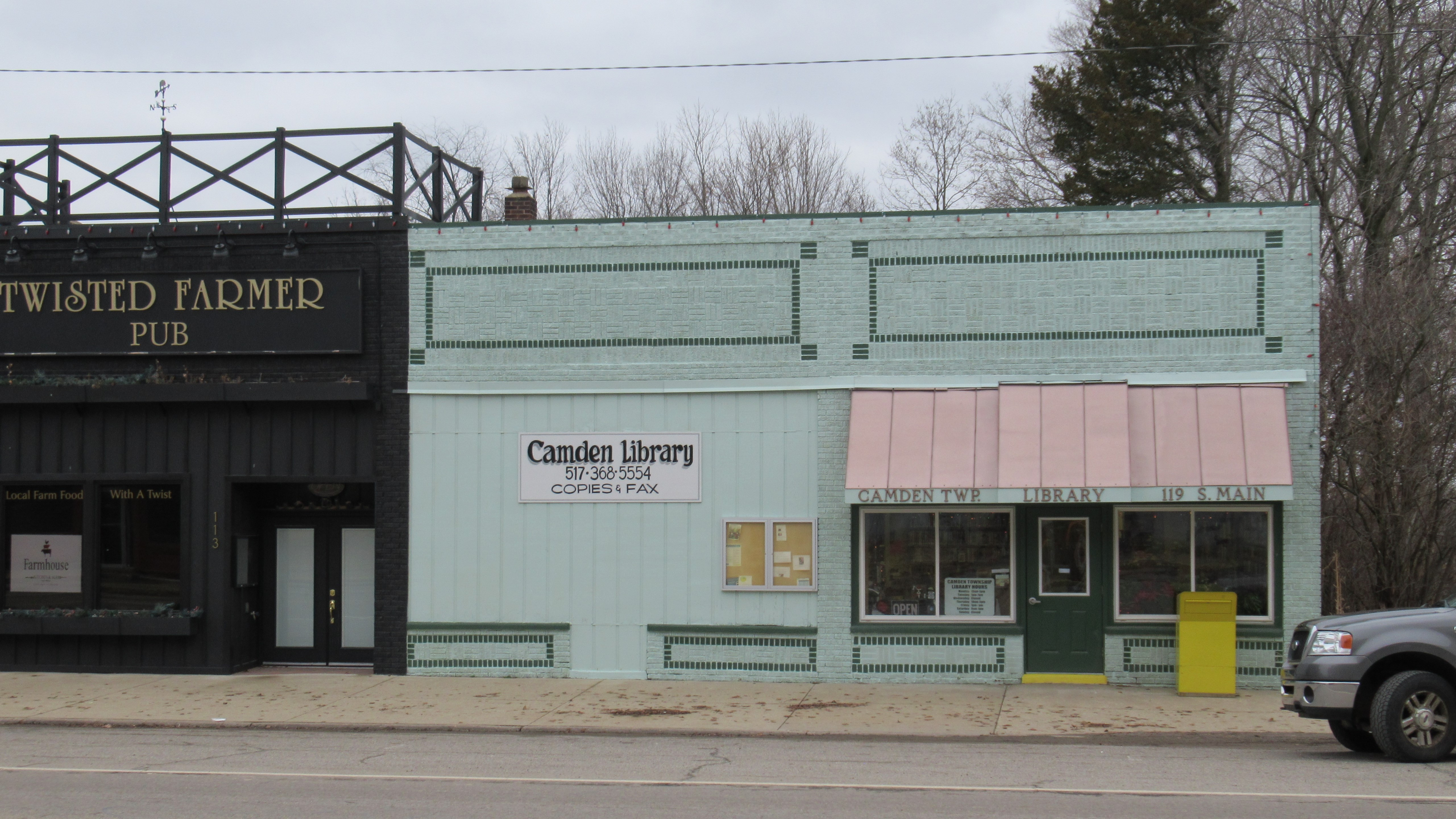
Camden Library
