= Amboy Township, Michigan =

- Civil township
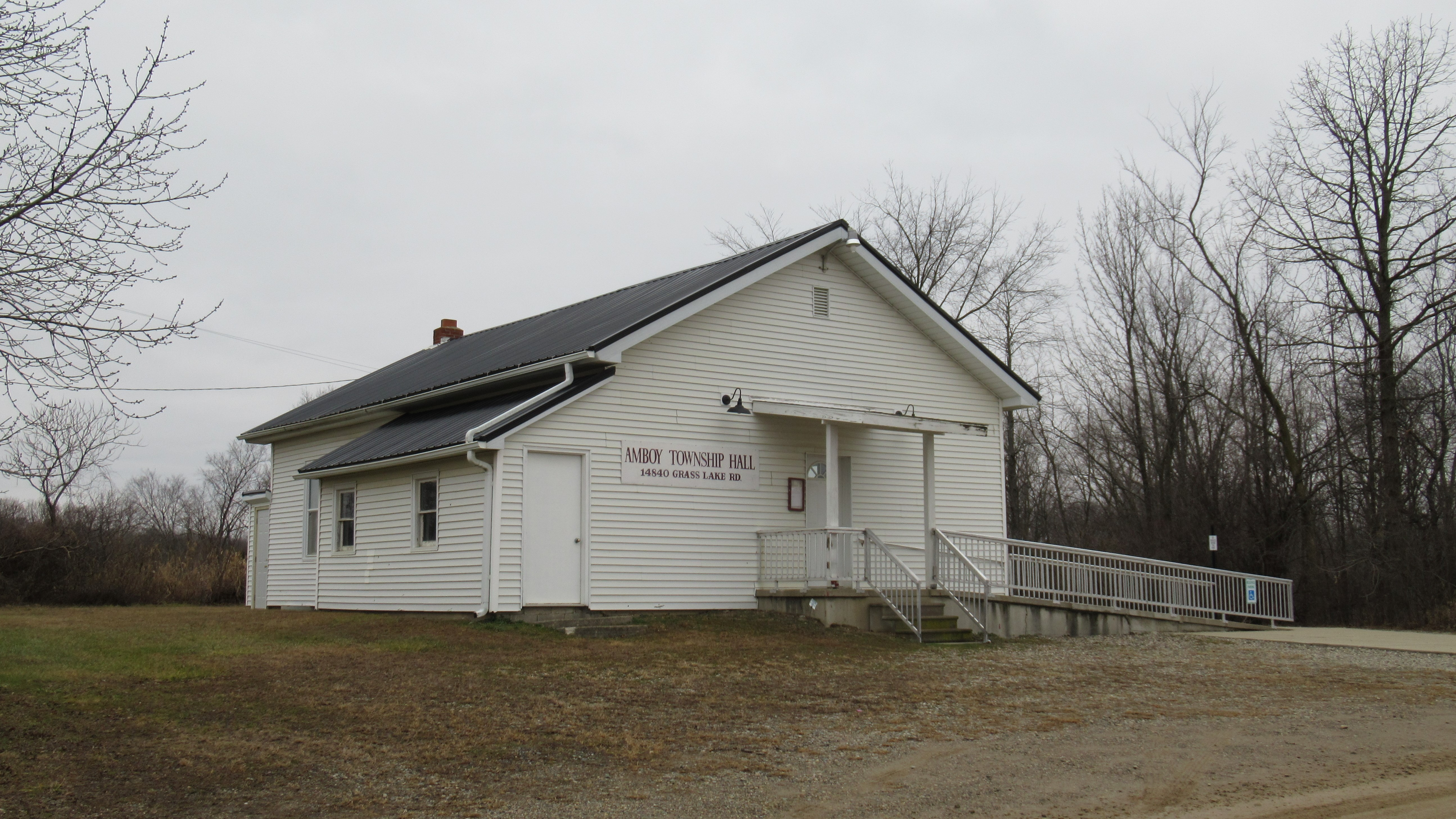
- Amboy Township Hall

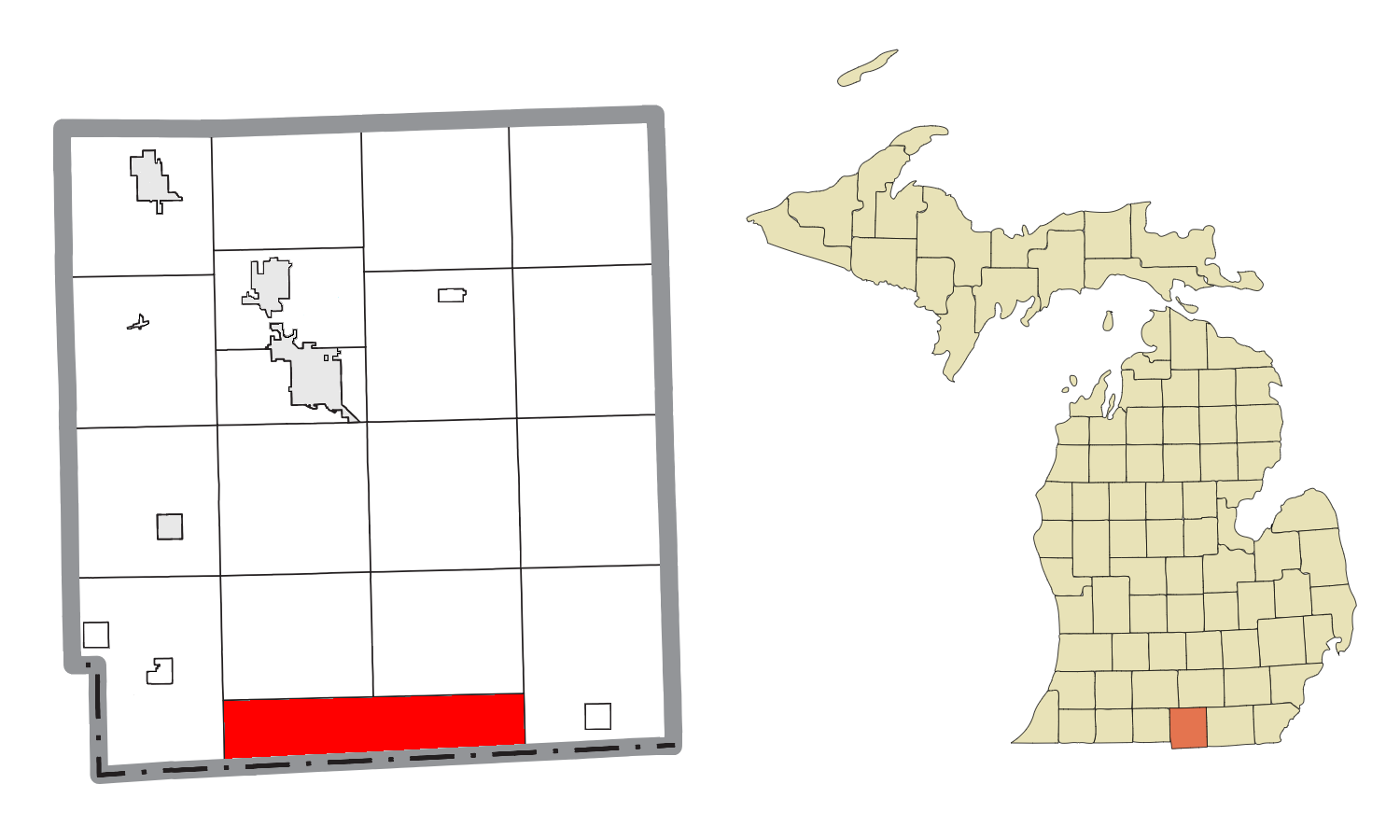
- Location within Hillsdale County

- Location within the state of Michigan Location within the United States
- Coordinates: 41°42′59″N 84°36′08″W
- Country: United States
- State: Michigan
- County: Hillsdale
- Established: 1850

Government
  - Supervisor: Brad Smith
  - Clerk: Betty Burkhart

Area
  - Total: 30.64 sq mi (79.36 km^{2})
  - Land: 29.96 sq mi (77.60 km^{2})
  - Water: 0.68 sq mi (1.76 km^{2})
- Elevation: 948 ft (289 m)

Population (2020)
  - Total: 1,064
  - Density: 35.5/sq mi (13.7/km^{2})
- Time zone: UTC-5 (Eastern (EST))
  - Summer (DST): UTC-4 (EDT)
- ZIP code(s): 49232 (Camden); 49266 (Osseo); 49288 (Waldron)
- Area code: 517
- FIPS code: 26-02020
- GNIS feature ID: 1625836

Amboy Township is a civil township of Hillsdale County in the U.S. state of Michigan. The population was 1,064 at the 2020 census.

== Communities ==
- Amboy (sometimes referred to as Amboy Center) is a historic settlement located within the township. It was settled in what was then Rowland Township. A post office named Rowland began operating here on December 12, 1840. The post office was renamed Bird on June 10, 1850 shortly after Amboy Township was established. The name of the post office was again changed to Amboy on December 28, 1855 and operated until December 14, 1903. It was also known as Drake's Corner after constable G. Drake and justice of the peace J. S. Drake.
- Austin is an unincorporated community in the northwest part of the township on the boundary with Woodbridge Township at 41°44′14″N 84°41′39″W. Also known as Whitetown, it was first settled by the White family.

== History ==
Amboy Township was formed by the Michigan Legislature on March 28, 1850 from the southern sections of Ransom Township and Woodbridge Township, which resulted in the new township's unusual shape along the state border with Ohio.

== Geography ==
According to the U.S. Census Bureau, the township has a total area of 30.64 square miles (79.36 km^{2}), of which 29.96 square miles (77.60 km^{2}) is land and 0.68 square miles (1.76 km^{2}) (2.22%) is water.

== Demographics ==
As of the census of 2000, there were 1,224 people, 457 households, and 350 families residing in the township. The population density was 40.8 inhabitants per square mile (15.8/km^{2}). There were 631 housing units at an average density of 21.1 per square mile (8.1/km^{2}). The racial makeup of the township was 99.59% White, 0.16% Native American, and 0.25% from two or more races. Hispanic or Latino of any race were 0.90% of the population.

There were 457 households, out of which 29.5% had children under the age of 18 living with them, 70.5% were married couples living together, 3.3% had a female householder with no husband present, and 23.4% were non-families. 19.7% of all households were made up of individuals, and 6.3% had someone living alone who was 65 years of age or older. The average household size was 2.65 and the average family size was 3.01.

In the township the population was spread out, with 24.8% under the age of 18, 6.4% from 18 to 24, 25.9% from 25 to 44, 30.6% from 45 to 64, and 12.3% who were 65 years of age or older. The median age was 41 years. For every 100 females, there were 106.1 males. For every 100 females age 18 and over, there were 103.3 males.

The median income for a household in the township was $42,250, and the median income for a family was $45,250. Males had a median income of $36,118 versus $25,809 for females. The per capita income for the township was $20,578. About 6.5% of families and 10.7% of the population were below the poverty line, including 15.3% of those under age 18 and 5.1% of those age 65 or over.

== Education ==
Amboy Township is served by two separate public school districts. The majority of the township is served by Camden-Frontier Schools, which has its campus located northerly in Woodbridge Township, at the border with Camden Township. A small eastern portion of the township is served by Waldron Area Schools to east in Waldron.

== Images ==
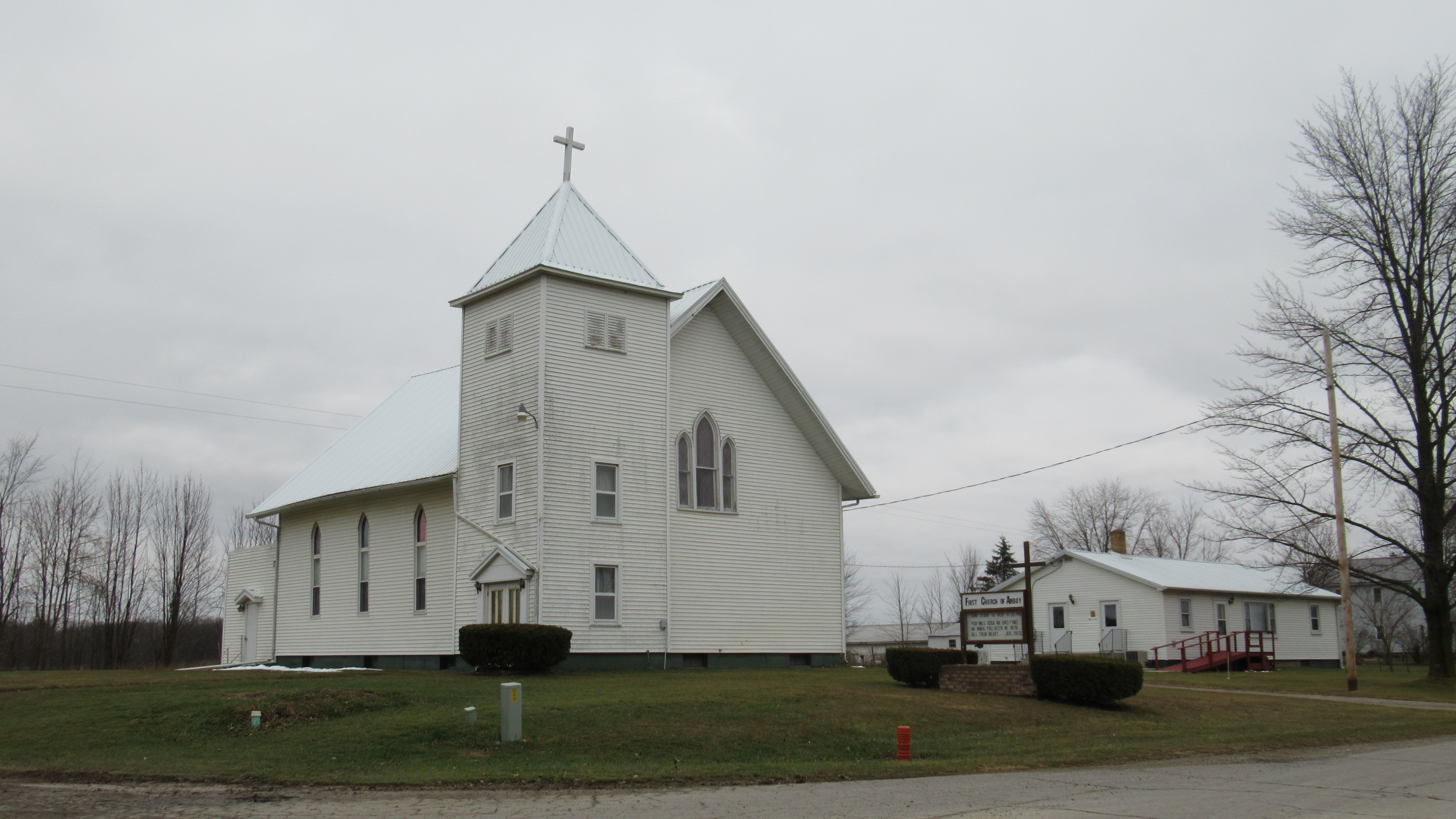
First Church of Amboy

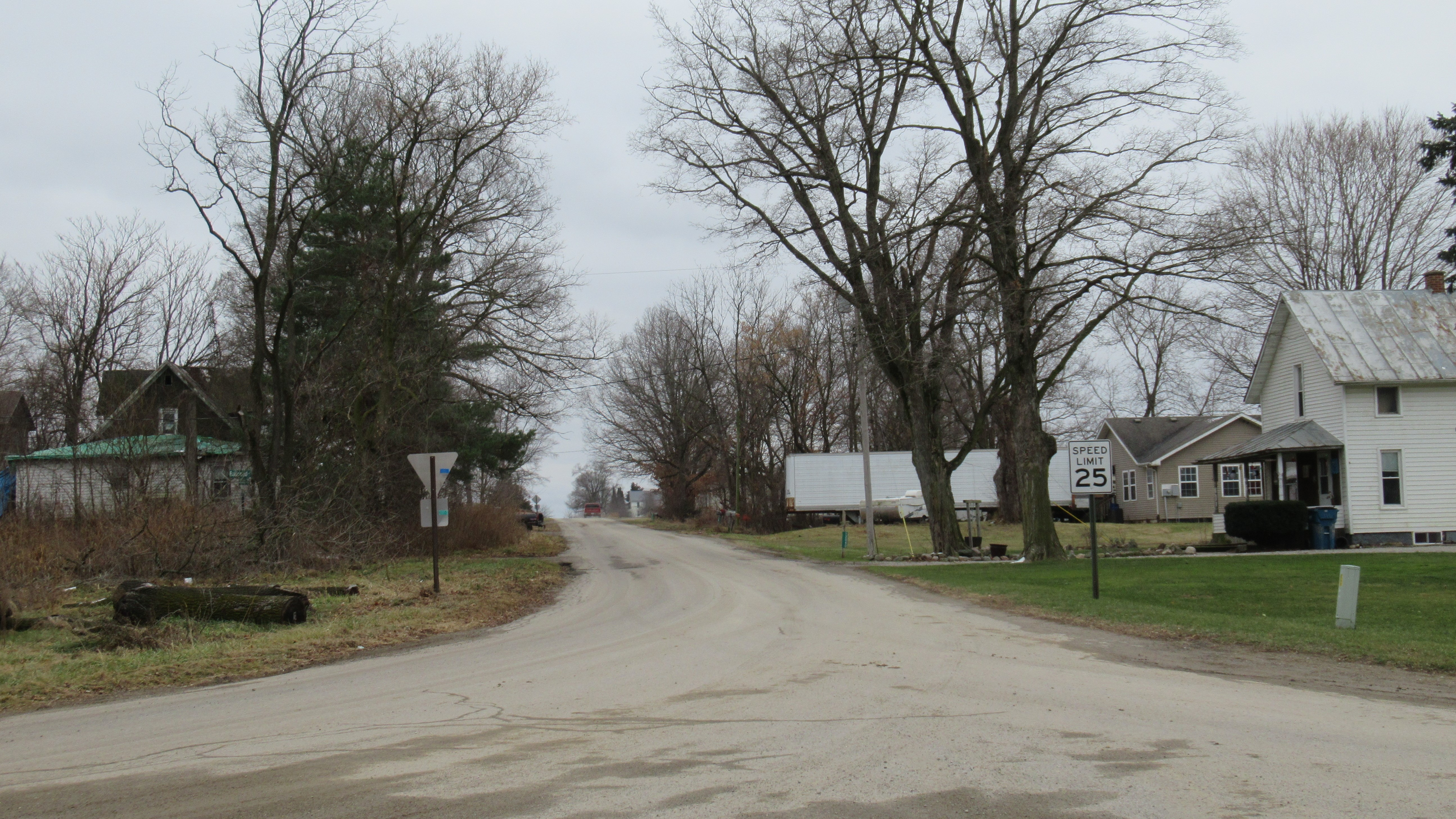
Unincorporated community of Austin

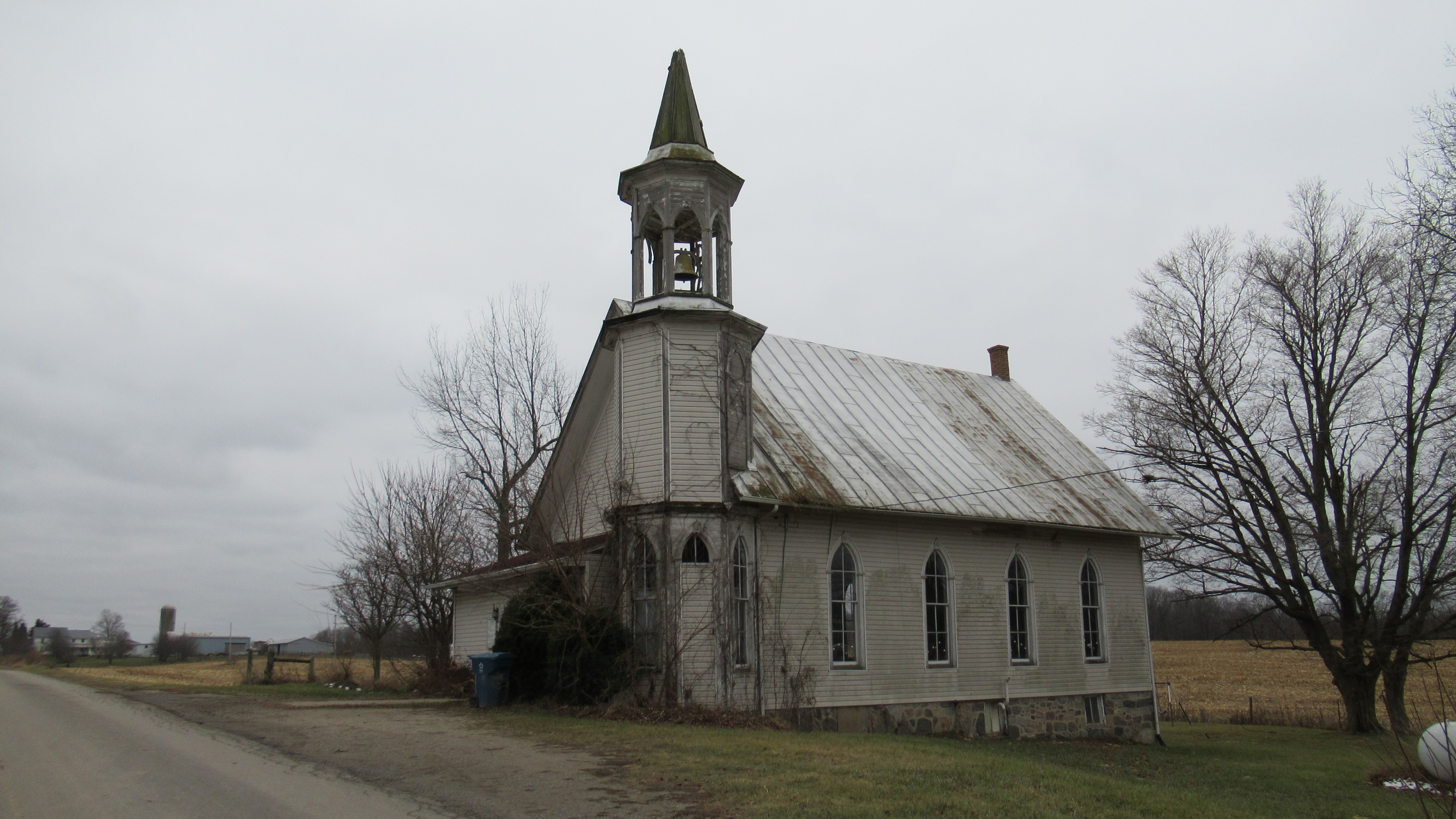
Tri-State Baptist Church
