= Camden-Frontier Schools =

School district in Michigan, United States

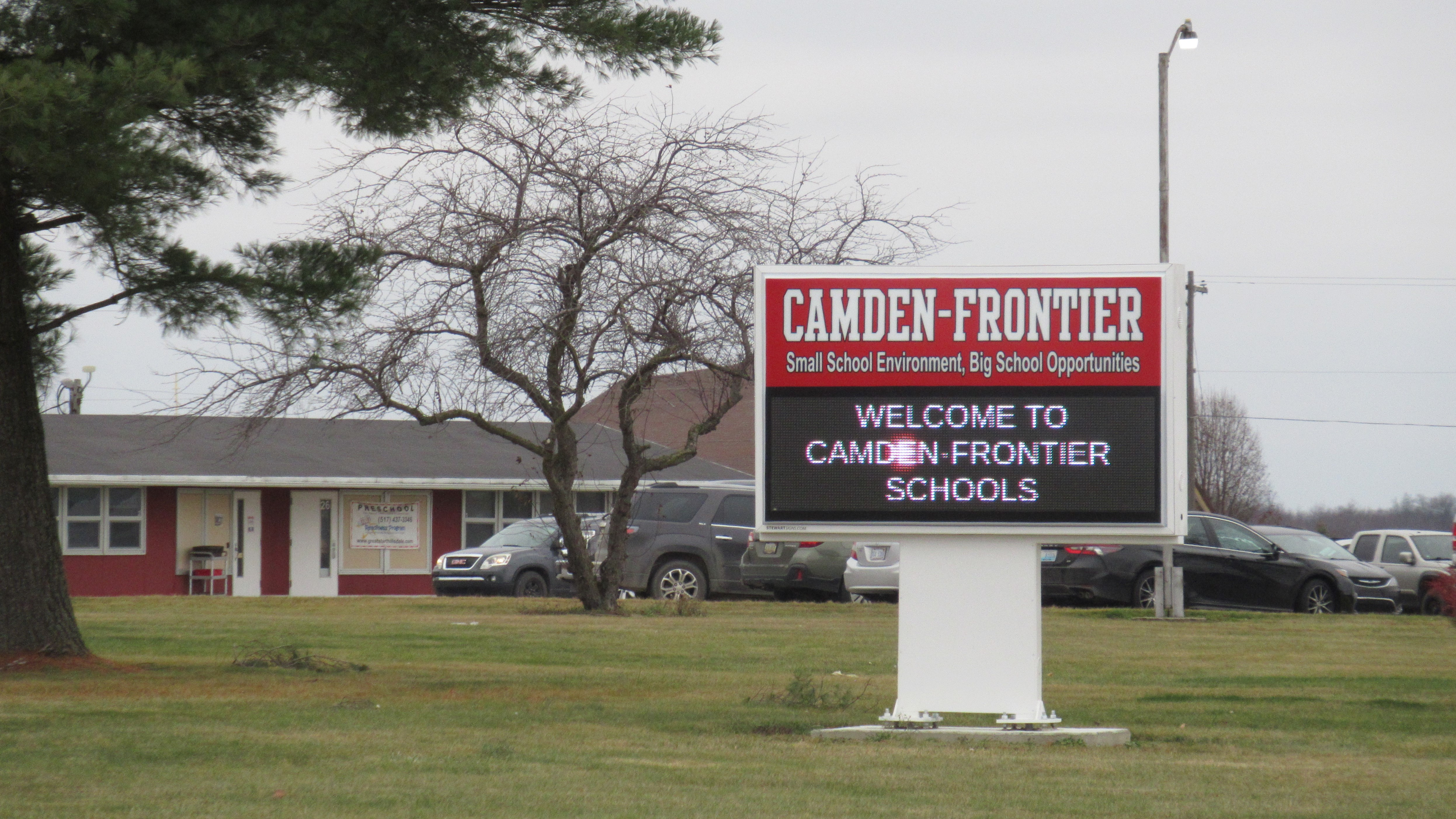

Address
- 4971 W. Montgomery Road Camden, Hillsdale County, Michigan, 49232; United States
- Coordinates: 41.7818°N 84.7071°W

District information
- Motto: Small school environment, big school opportunities.
- Grades: Kindergarten–12
- Superintendent: Chris Adams
- Schools: 1
- Budget: $7,610,000 2022–2023 expenditures
- NCES District ID: 2607710

Students and staff
- Students: 432 (2024–2025)
- Teachers: 34.83 (on an FTE basis) (2024–2025)
- Staff: 63.31 FTE (2024–2025)
- Student–teacher ratio: 12.4 (2024–2025)
- District mascot: Redhawks

Other information
- Website: www.camdenfrontier.org

Camden-Frontier Schools is a public school district in Hillsdale County, Michigan. It serves Camden and parts of the townships of Amboy, Cambria, Camden, Jefferson, and Ransom. It also serves part of California Township in Branch County.

Camden-Frontier Schools operates a single K-12 school building at 4871 West Montgomery Road in Camden.

== History ==
Nineteen small independent school districts, including the districts in the villages of Camden and Frontier, consolidated in 1945 to form the current district. On April 11, 1953, the current school building was dedicated.
